= List of Swiss federal referendums =

List of federal popular votes in Switzerland since 1848

The List of Swiss federal referendums details all federal referendums held in Switzerland since the establishment of the modern Swiss federal state in 1848. These referendums arise from:

- Popular initiatives (marked with I ),
- Direct counter-proposals to such initiatives (marked with G ),
- Mandatory referendums (marked with O ), or
- Optional referendums (marked with F ).

Since federal popular initiatives always propose amendments to the Federal Constitution (rather than ordinary laws), they require both a majority of the popular vote and a majority of the cantons (known as the double majority) for approval. Six cantons, historically referred to as half-cantons, each carry half a cantonal vote. The same requirement applies to mandatory referendums and direct counter-proposals, as these are triggered by parliamentary amendments to the Constitution (Template error: argument link is required.). Optional referendums, which concern federal laws and certain international treaties, require only a majority of the popular vote for approval (Template error: argument link is required.).

The comprehensive list is organized by decade. Each section begins with links to annual overviews that briefly describe the proposals, followed by links to articles on specific proposals where available.

== Federal referendums ==
=== 2020–present ===
Annual overviews: 2020 | 2021 | 2022 | 2023 | 2024 | 2025 | 2026

Date	Proposal title		Participation	Yes vote share	Cantons Yes : No	Result
February 9, 2025	I	Federal popular initiative "For a responsible economy within planetary boundaries (Environmental Responsibility Initiative)"	37.94%	30.16%	0 : 23	No
November 24, 2024	F	Federal resolution on the 2023 national road expansion step	47.30%	45.05%		No
November 24, 2024	F	Amendment to the Code of Obligations (Tenancy law: Subletting)	48.42%	44.89%		No
November 24, 2024	F	Amendment to the Code of Obligations (Tenancy law: Termination for personal use)	46.17%	44.90%		No
November 24, 2024	F	Amendment to the Federal Health Insurance Act (Uniform financing of services)	44.87%	53.31%		Yes
September 22, 2024	I	Federal popular initiative "For the future of our nature and landscape (Biodiversity Initiative)"	45.19%	36.97%	1½ : 21½	No
September 22, 2024	F	Amendment of March 17, 2023, to the Federal Act on Occupational Retirement, Survivors' and Disability Pension Plans (BVG) (Occupational pension reform)	45.04%	32.88%		No
June 9, 2024	I	Federal popular initiative "Maximum 10% of income for health insurance premiums (Premium Relief Initiative)"	45.4%	44.5%	7½ : 15½	No
June 9, 2024	I	Federal popular initiative "For lower premiums – Cost brake in the healthcare system (Cost Brake Initiative)"	45.4%	37.2%	5 : 18	No
June 9, 2024	I	Federal popular initiative "For freedom and physical integrity"	45.3%	26.3%	0 : 23	No
June 9, 2024	F	Federal Act of September 29, 2023, on a secure electricity supply with renewable energies (Amendment to the Energy Act and the Electricity Supply Act)	45.4%	68.7%		Yes
March 3, 2024	I	Federal popular initiative "For a secure and sustainable pension system"	58.1%	25.3%	0 : 23	No
March 3, 2024	I	Federal popular initiative "For a better life in old age (13th AHV pension initiative)"	58.3%	58.2%	15 : 8	Yes
June 18, 2023	F	Amendment of December 16, 2022, to the Federal Act on the Statutory Basis for Federal Council Ordinances to Address the COVID-19 Epidemic (COVID-19 Act)	42.49%	61.94%		Yes
June 18, 2023	O	Federal resolution on special taxation of large corporate groups (Implementation of the OECD/G20 project on taxation of large corporate groups)	42.37%	78.45%	23 : 0	Yes
June 18, 2023	F	Federal Act on Climate Protection Goals, Innovation, and Strengthening Energy Security (Climate Act)	42.54%	59.07%		Yes
September 25, 2022	I	Federal popular initiative "No to factory farming in Switzerland (Factory Farming Initiative)"	52.27%	37.14%	½ : 22½	No
September 25, 2022	O	Federal resolution on additional financing of the AHV through an increase in value-added tax	52.16%	55.07%	18 : 5	Yes
September 25, 2022	F	Amendment to the Federal Act on Old-Age and Survivors' Insurance	52.18%	50.57%		Yes
September 25, 2022	F	Amendment to the Federal Act on Withholding Tax	51.7%	47.99%		No
May 15, 2022	F	Amendment of October 1, 2021, to the Federal Act on Film Production and Film Culture (Film Act)	40.03%	58.42%		Yes
May 15, 2022	F	Amendment of October 1, 2021, to the Federal Act on the Transplantation of Organs, Tissues, and Cells (Transplantation Act)	40.26%	60.20%		Yes
May 15, 2022	F	Federal resolution of October 1, 2021, on the approval and implementation of the exchange of notes between Switzerland and the EU concerning the adoption of Regulation (EU) 2019/1896 on the European Border and Coast Guard and repealing Regulations (EU) No. 1052/2013 and (EU) 2016/1624 (Further development of the Schengen acquis)	39.98%	71.48%		Yes
February 13, 2022	I	Federal popular initiative "Yes to a ban on animal and human experiments – Yes to research paths with impulses for safety and progress" (Animal Testing Ban Initiative)	44.19%	20.92%	0 : 23	No
February 13, 2022	I	Federal popular initiative "Yes to protecting children and youth from tobacco advertising"	44.23%	56.61%	15 : 8	Yes
February 13, 2022	F	Amendment of June 18, 2021, to the Federal Act on Stamp Duties	44.02%	37.33%		No
February 13, 2022	F	Federal Act of June 18, 2021, on a package of measures in favor of the media (Media Act)	44.13%	45.44%		No
November 28, 2021	I	Federal popular initiative "For strong nursing care (Nursing Initiative)"	65.30%	60.98%	22½ : ½	Yes
November 28, 2021	I	Federal popular initiative "Appointment of federal judges by lot" (Justice Initiative)	64.67%	31.93%	0 : 23	No
November 28, 2021	F	Amendment of March 19, 2021, to the COVID-19 Act	65.72%	62.02%		Yes
September 26, 2021	I	Federal popular initiative "Relieve wages, tax capital fairly" (99% Initiative)	52.23%	35.12%	0 : 23	No
September 26, 2021	F	Amendment of December 18, 2020, to the Swiss Civil Code (Marriage for all)	52.60%	64.10%		Yes
June 13, 2021	I	Federal popular initiative "For clean drinking water and healthy food – No subsidies for pesticide and prophylactic antibiotic use"	59.78%	39.31%	½ : 22½	No
June 13, 2021	I	Federal popular initiative "For a Switzerland without synthetic pesticides"	59.76%	39.44%	½ : 22½	No
June 13, 2021	F	Federal Act of September 25, 2020, on the Statutory Basis for Federal Council Ordinances to Address the COVID-19 Epidemic (COVID-19 Act)	59.66%	60.20%		Yes
June 13, 2021	F	Federal Act of September 25, 2020, on the Reduction of Greenhouse Gas Emissions (CO2 Act)	59.70%	48.41%		No
June 13, 2021	F	Federal Act of September 25, 2020, on Police Measures to Combat Terrorism (PMT)	59.57%	56.58%		Yes
March 7, 2021	I	Federal popular initiative "Yes to a ban on full facial coverings"	51.42%	51.19%	18½ : 4½	Yes
March 7, 2021	F	Federal Act of September 27, 2019, on Electronic Identification Services (E-ID Act)	51.29%	35.64%		No
March 7, 2021	F	Federal resolution of December 20, 2019, on the approval of the "Comprehensive Economic Partnership Agreement between the EFTA States and Indonesia"	51.10%	51.65%		Yes
November 29, 2020	I	Federal popular initiative "For responsible companies – to protect people and the environment"	47.04%	50.73%	8½ : 14½	No
November 29, 2020	I	Federal popular initiative "For a ban on financing war material producers"	46.95%	42.55%	3½ : 19½	No
September 27, 2020	I	Federal popular initiative "For moderate immigration (Limitation Initiative)"	59.49%	38.29%	3½ : 19½	No
September 27, 2020	F	Amendment of September 27, 2019, to the Federal Act on Hunting and the Protection of Wild Mammals and Birds (Hunting Act)	59.34%	48.07%		No
September 27, 2020	F	Amendment of September 27, 2019, to the Federal Act on Direct Federal Tax (Tax consideration of third-party childcare costs)	59.21%	36.76%		No
September 27, 2020	F	Amendment of September 27, 2019, to the Federal Act on Income Compensation for Service and Maternity (Indirect counter-proposal to the popular initiative "For reasonable paternity leave – for the benefit of the whole family")	59.36%	60.34%		Yes
September 27, 2020	F	Federal resolution of December 20, 2019, on the procurement of new fighter jets	59.43%	50.13%		Yes
February 9, 2020	I	Federal popular initiative "More affordable housing"	41.68%	42.95%	4½ : 18½	No
February 9, 2020	F	Amendment of December 14, 2018, to the Criminal Code and the Military Criminal Code	41.69%	63.09%		Yes

=== 2010–2019 ===
Annual overviews: 2010 | 2011 | 2012 | 2013 | 2014 | 2015 | 2016 | 2017 | 2018 | 2019

Date	Proposal title		Participation	Yes vote share	Cantons Yes : No	Result
May 19, 2019	F	Federal Act of September 28, 2018, on Tax Reform and AHV Financing	43.74%	66.38%		Yes
May 19, 2019	F	Federal resolution of September 28, 2018, on the approval and implementation of the exchange of notes between Switzerland and the EU concerning the adoption of Directive (EU) 2017/853 amending the EU Firearms Directive (Further development of the Schengen acquis)	43.88%	63.74%		Yes
February 10, 2019	I	Federal popular initiative "Stop urban sprawl – for sustainable settlement development (Urban Sprawl Initiative)"	37.92%	36.34%	0 : 23	No
November 25, 2018	I	Federal popular initiative "For the dignity of farm animals (Horned Cow Initiative)"	48.30%	45.27%	5 : 18	No
November 25, 2018	I	Federal popular initiative "Swiss law instead of foreign judges (Self-Determination Initiative)"	48.41%	33.73%	0 : 23	No
November 25, 2018	F	Amendment to the Federal Act of March 16, 2018, on the General Provisions of Social Insurance Law (Legal basis for monitoring insured persons)	48.38%	64.72%		Yes
September 23, 2018	G	Federal resolution of March 13, 2018, on cycle paths and footpaths (Counter-proposal to the withdrawn popular initiative "To promote cycle, foot, and hiking paths (Cycle Initiative)")	37.48%	73.59%	23 : 0	Yes
September 23, 2018	I	Federal popular initiative "For healthy, environmentally friendly, and fairly produced food (Fair Food Initiative)"	37.52%	38.70%	4 : 19	No
September 23, 2018	I	Federal popular initiative "For food sovereignty. Agriculture concerns us all"	37.47%	31.62%	4 : 19	No
June 10, 2018	I	Federal popular initiative "For crisis-proof money: Money creation solely by the National Bank! (Sovereign Money Initiative)"	34.55%	24.28%	0 : 23	No
June 10, 2018	F	Federal Act of September 29, 2017, on Gambling (Gambling Act)	34.52%	72.94%		Yes
March 4, 2018	O	Federal resolution of June 16, 2017, on the new financial order 2021	53.87%	84.11%	23 : 0	Yes
March 4, 2018	I	Federal popular initiative "Yes to abolishing radio and television fees (Abolition of Billag fees)"	54.84%	28.44%	0 : 23	No
September 24, 2017	G	Federal resolution of March 14, 2017, on food security (Counter-proposal to the withdrawn popular initiative "For food security")	47.11%	78.73%	23 : 0	Yes
September 24, 2017	O	Federal resolution of March 17, 2017, on additional financing of the AHV through an increase in value-added tax	47.39%	49.95%	9½ : 13½	No
September 24, 2017	F	Federal Act of March 17, 2017, on the 2020 pension reform	47.39%	47.31%		No
May 21, 2017	F	Energy Act of September 30, 2016	42.89%	58.22%		Yes
February 12, 2017	O	Federal resolution of September 30, 2016, on facilitated naturalization of third-generation foreigners	46.84%	60.41%	17 : 6	Yes
February 12, 2017	O	Federal resolution of September 30, 2016, on the creation of a fund for national roads and urban traffic	46.62%	61.95%	23 : 0	Yes
February 12, 2017	F	Corporate Tax Reform Act III	46.61%	40.92%		No
November 27, 2016	I	Federal popular initiative "For an orderly withdrawal from nuclear energy (Nuclear Withdrawal Initiative)"	45.38%	45.80%	5 : 17	No
September 25, 2016	I	Federal popular initiative "For a sustainable and resource-efficient economy (Green Economy)"	43.00%	36.43%	1 : 22	No
September 25, 2016	I	Federal popular initiative "AHVplus: for a strong AHV"	43.13%	40.60%	5 : 18	No
September 25, 2016	F	Federal Act of September 25, 2015, on Intelligence Services (Intelligence Service Act)	42.94%	65.51%		Yes
June 5, 2016	I	Federal popular initiative "Pro Service public"	46.77%	32.38%	0 : 23	No
June 5, 2016	I	Federal popular initiative "For an unconditional basic income"	46.95%	23.06%	0 : 23	No
June 5, 2016	I	Federal popular initiative "For fair transport financing"	46.78%	29.22%	0 : 23	No
June 5, 2016	F	Amendment to the Federal Act on Medically Assisted Reproduction (Reproductive Medicine Act)	46.68%	62.42%		Yes
June 5, 2016	F	Amendment of September 25, 2015, to the Asylum Act	46.79%	66.78%		Yes
February 28, 2016	I	Federal popular initiative "For marriage and family – against the marriage penalty"	63.25%	49.16%	16½ : 6½	No
February 28, 2016	I	Federal popular initiative "To enforce the deportation of criminal foreigners (Enforcement Initiative)"	63.73%	41.15%	4½ : 18½	No
February 28, 2016	I	Federal popular initiative "No speculation with food commodities!"	62.91%	40.07%	1½ : 21½	No
February 28, 2016	F	Amendment to the Federal Act on Road Transit Traffic in the Alpine Region (Renovation of the Gotthard Road Tunnel)	63.47%	57.01%		Yes
June 14, 2015	O	Federal resolution of September 19, 2013, on amending the constitutional provision on reproductive medicine and human genetic engineering	43.51%	61.93%	18½ : 4½	Yes
June 14, 2015	I	Federal popular initiative "Scholarship Initiative"	43.45%	27.46%	0 : 23	No
June 14, 2015	I	Federal popular initiative "Tax millionaires' inheritances for our AHV (Inheritance Tax Reform)"	43.71%	28.96%	0 : 23	No
June 14, 2015	F	Amendment of September 26, 2014, to the Federal Act on Radio and Television	43.65%	50.08%		Yes
March 8, 2015	I	Federal popular initiative "Strengthen families! Tax-free child and education allowances"	42.07%	24.58%	0 : 23	No
March 8, 2015	I	Federal popular initiative "Energy instead of VAT"	42.06%	8.03%	0 : 23	No
November 30, 2014	I	Federal popular initiative "End tax privileges for millionaires (Abolition of lump-sum taxation)"	49.91%	40.80%	1 : 22	No
November 30, 2014	I	Federal popular initiative "Stop overpopulation – to secure natural resources"	49.98%	25.90%	0 : 23	No
November 30, 2014	I	Federal popular initiative "Save our Swiss gold (Gold Initiative)"	49.81%	22.72%	0 : 23	No
September 28, 2014	I	Federal popular initiative "End VAT discrimination in the hospitality industry!"	46.96%	28.48%	0 : 23	No
September 28, 2014	I	Federal popular initiative "For a public health insurance fund"	47.18%	38.16%	4 : 19	No
May 18, 2014	G	Federal resolution of September 19, 2013, on primary medical care (Direct counter-proposal to the popular initiative "Yes to family medicine")	55.85%	88.07%	23 : 0	Yes
May 18, 2014	I	Federal popular initiative "Pedophiles should no longer work with children"	56.18%	63.53%	23 : 0	Yes
May 18, 2014	I	Federal popular initiative "To protect fair wages (Minimum Wage Initiative)"	56.36%	23.73%	0 : 23	No
May 18, 2014	F	Federal Act of September 27, 2013, on the fund for the procurement of the Gripen fighter jet (Gripen Fund Act)	56.33%	46.59%		No
February 9, 2014	G	Federal resolution of June 20, 2013, on financing and expanding railway infrastructure (Direct counter-proposal to the popular initiative "For public transport")	56.24%	62.02%	22 : 1	Yes
February 9, 2014	I	Federal popular initiative "Abortion funding is a private matter – Relieve health insurance by removing abortion costs from mandatory basic insurance"	56.42%	30.18%	½ : 22½	No
February 9, 2014	I	Federal popular initiative "Against mass immigration"	56.57%	50.33%	14½ : 8½	Yes
November 24, 2013	I	Federal popular initiative "1:12 – For fair wages"	53.63%	34.70%	0 : 23	No
November 24, 2013	I	Federal popular initiative "Family initiative: Tax deductions also for parents who care for their children themselves"	53.59%	41.53%	2½ : 20½	No
November 24, 2013	F	Amendment of March 22, 2013, to the Federal Act on the Toll for the Use of National Roads (National Roads Toll Act)	53.61%	39.54%		No
September 22, 2013	I	Federal popular initiative "Yes to the abolition of conscription"	46.99%	26.79%	0 : 23	No
September 22, 2013	F	Federal Act of September 28, 2012, on Combating Communicable Human Diseases (Epidemics Act)	46.76%	60.00%		Yes
September 22, 2013	F	Amendment of December 14, 2012, to the Federal Act on Work in Industry, Trade, and Commerce (Labor Act)	46.77%	55.79%		Yes
June 9, 2013	I	Federal popular initiative "People's election of the Federal Council"	39.43%	23.66%	0 : 23	No
June 9, 2013	F	Amendment of September 28, 2012, to the Asylum Act (Urgent amendments to the Asylum Act)	39.52%	78.45%		Yes
March 3, 2013	O	Federal resolution of June 15, 2012, on family policy	46.61%	54.35%	10 : 13	No
March 3, 2013	I	Federal popular initiative "Against rip-off salaries"	46.74%	67.96%	23 : 0	Yes
March 3, 2013	F	Amendment of June 15, 2012, to the Federal Act on Spatial Planning (Spatial Planning Act)	45.51%	62.89%		Yes
November 25, 2012	F	Amendment of March 16, 2012, to the Animal Diseases Act	27.60%	68.28%		Yes
September 23, 2012	G	Federal resolution of March 15, 2012, on promoting youth music (Counter-proposal to the popular initiative "youth + music")	42.41%	72.69%	20½ : 0	Yes
September 23, 2012	I	Federal popular initiative "Secure living in old age"	42.53%	47.39%	9½ : 13½	No
September 23, 2012	I	Federal popular initiative "Protection against second-hand smoke"	42.81%	34.01%	1 : 22	No
June 17, 2012	I	Federal popular initiative "Own four walls thanks to home savings"	38.53%	31.09%	0 : 23	No
June 17, 2012	I	Federal popular initiative "To strengthen people's rights in foreign policy (Treaties to the people!)"	38.53%	24.72%	0 : 23	No
June 17, 2012	F	Amendment of September 30, 2011, to the Federal Act on Health Insurance (Managed Care)	38.65%	23.95%		No
March 11, 2012	I	Federal popular initiative "End the unchecked construction of second homes!"	45.18%	50.63%	13½ : 9½	Yes
March 11, 2012	I	Federal popular initiative "For tax-advantaged home savings to acquire owner-occupied housing and finance energy-saving and environmental measures (Home Savings Initiative)"	44.99%	44.19%	4½ : 18½	No
March 11, 2012	I	Federal popular initiative "6 weeks of vacation for all"	45.42%	33.50%	0 : 23	No
March 11, 2012	G	Federal resolution of September 29, 2011, on regulating gambling for charitable purposes (Counter-proposal to the popular initiative "For gambling in the service of the common good")	44.77%	87.09%	23 : 0	Yes
March 11, 2012	F	Federal Act of March 18, 2011, on book price regulation	44.86%	43.92%		No
February 13, 2011	I	Federal popular initiative "For protection against gun violence"	49.12%	43.70%	5½ : 17½	No
November 28, 2010	I	Federal popular initiative "For the deportation of criminal foreigners (Deportation Initiative)"	52.93%	52.27%	17½ : 5½	Yes
November 28, 2010	G	Federal resolution of June 10, 2010, on the deportation and expulsion of criminal foreigners within the framework of the Federal Constitution (Counter-proposal to the popular initiative "For the deportation of criminal foreigners")	52.93%	44.64%	0 : 23	No
November 28, 2010	S	Tiebreaker question (In case of a double yes: 50.37% for the counter-proposal and 15 : 8 cantons for the popular initiative; due to the percentage summation rule, the popular initiative would have taken effect in case of a "double yes")	52.93%			
November 28, 2010	I	Federal popular initiative "For fair taxes. Stop the abuse in tax competition (Tax Justice Initiative)"	52.36%	41.54%	3½ : 19½	No
September 26, 2010	F	Amendment of March 19, 2010, to the Federal Act on Compulsory Unemployment Insurance and Insolvency Compensation (Unemployment Insurance Act)	35.84%	53.42%		Yes
March 7, 2010	F	Amendment of December 19, 2008, to the Federal Act on Occupational Retirement, Survivors' and Disability Pension Plans (Minimum conversion rate)	45.72%	27.27%		No
March 7, 2010	I	Federal popular initiative "Against animal cruelty and for better legal protection of animals (Animal Welfare Lawyer Initiative)"	45.82%	29.50%	0 : 23	No
March 7, 2010	O	Federal resolution of September 25, 2009, on a constitutional article on human research	45.49%	77.21%	23 : 0	Yes
February 1, 2010	Introduction of the conditional withdrawal of popular initiatives					

=== 2000–2009 ===
Annual overviews: 2000 | 2001 | 2002 | 2003 | 2004 | 2005 | 2006 | 2007 | 2008 | 2009

Date	Proposal title		Participation	Yes vote share	Cantons Yes : No	Result
November 29, 2009	O	Federal resolution of October 3, 2008, on creating special financing for air traffic tasks	52.63%	64.99%	23 : 0	Yes
November 29, 2009	I	Federal popular initiative "For a ban on war material exports"	53.39%	31.77%	0 : 23	No
November 29, 2009	I	Federal popular initiative "Against the construction of minarets"	53.76%	57.50%	19½ : 3½	Yes
September 27, 2009	O	Federal resolution of June 13, 2008, on temporary additional financing for disability insurance through an increase in VAT rates, amended by the federal resolution of June 12, 2009, modifying this resolution	41.01%	54.56%	12 : 11	Yes
September 27, 2009	O	Federal resolution of December 19, 2008, on abandoning the introduction of the general popular initiative	40.43%	67.88%	23 : 0	Yes
May 17, 2009	F	Federal resolution of June 13, 2008, on the approval and implementation of the exchange of notes between Switzerland and the European Community concerning the adoption of Regulation (EC) No. 2252/2004 on biometric passports and travel documents (Further development of the Schengen acquis)	38.77%	50.15%		Yes
May 17, 2009	G	Constitutional article of October 3, 2008, "Future with complementary medicine"	38.80%	67.03%	23 : 0	Yes
February 8, 2009	F	Federal resolution of June 13, 2008, on the approval of the continuation of the Agreement on the Free Movement of Persons between Switzerland and the European Community and its member states, as well as the approval and implementation of the protocol extending the Free Movement Agreement to Bulgaria and Romania	51.44%	59.61%		Yes
November 30, 2008	I	Federal popular initiative "For the imprescriptibility of pornographic crimes against children"	47.52%	51.87%	18 : 5	Yes
November 30, 2008	I	Federal popular initiative "For a flexible AHV retirement age"	47.64%	41.38%	4 : 19	No
November 30, 2008	I	Federal popular initiative "Association complaint right: End obstructionist policies – More growth for Switzerland!"	47.22%	34.00%	0 : 23	No
November 30, 2008	I	Federal popular initiative "For a sensible hemp policy with effective youth protection"	47.34%	36.75%	0 : 23	No
November 30, 2008	F	Amendment of March 20, 2008, to the Federal Act on Narcotics and Psychotropic Substances (Narcotics Act)	47.14%	68.08%		Yes
June 1, 2008	I	Federal popular initiative "People's sovereignty instead of official propaganda"	44.85%	24.80%	0 : 23	No
June 1, 2008	I	Federal popular initiative "For democratic naturalizations"	45.18%	36.25%	1 : 22	No
June 1, 2008	G	Constitutional article of December 21, 2007, "For quality and efficiency in health insurance"	44.81%	30.52%	0 : 23	No
February 24, 2008	I	Federal popular initiative "Against fighter jet noise in tourism areas"	38.74%	31.92%	0 : 23	No
February 24, 2008	F	Federal Act of March 23, 2007, on improving tax conditions for entrepreneurial activities and investments (Corporate Tax Reform Act II)	38.62%	50.53%		Yes
June 17, 2007	F	Amendment of October 6, 2006, to the Federal Act on Disability Insurance	36.20%	59.09%		Yes
March 11, 2007	I	Federal popular initiative "For a single social health insurance"	45.95%	28.76%	2 : 21	No
November 26, 2006	F	Federal Act of March 24, 2006, on cooperation with Eastern European states	44.98%	53.42%		Yes
November 26, 2006	F	Federal Act of March 24, 2006, on family allowances (Family Allowances Act)	45.01%	67.98%		Yes
September 24, 2006	I	Federal popular initiative "Swiss National Bank profits for the AHV"	48.75%	41.74%	2½ : 20½	No
September 24, 2006	F	Federal Act of December 16, 2005, on foreigners	48.91%	67.97%		Yes
September 24, 2006	F	Amendment of December 16, 2005, to the Asylum Act	48.91%	67.75%		Yes
May 21, 2006	O	Federal resolution of December 16, 2005, on reorganizing constitutional provisions on education	27.80%	85.58%	23 : 0	Yes
November 27, 2005	I	Federal resolution on the popular initiative "For food from GM-free agriculture"	42.24%	55.67%	23 : 0	Yes
November 27, 2005	F	Federal Act on Work in Industry, Trade, and Commerce (Labor Act)	42.31%	50.64%		Yes
September 25, 2005	F	Federal resolution on the approval and implementation of the protocol extending the Free Movement Agreement to new EU member states between the Swiss Confederation and the European Community and its member states, as well as the approval of the revision of accompanying measures on free movement of persons	54.51%	55.98%		Yes
June 5, 2005	F	Federal resolution of December 17, 2004, on the approval and implementation of bilateral agreements between Switzerland and the EU on association with Schengen and Dublin	56.63%	54.63%		Yes
June 5, 2005	F	Federal Act of June 18, 2004, on registered partnerships for same-sex couples (Registered Partnership Act)	56.51%	58.04%		Yes
November 28, 2004	O	Federal resolution of October 3, 2003, on redesigning financial equalization and task allocation between the Confederation and cantons	36.85%	64.37%	20½ : 2½	Yes
November 28, 2004	O	Federal resolution of March 19, 2004, on a new financial order	36.83%	73.81%	22 : 1	Yes
November 28, 2004	F	Federal Act of December 19, 2003, on embryonic stem cell research (Stem Cell Research Act)	37.02%	66.39%		Yes
September 26, 2004	O	Federal resolution of October 3, 2003, on ordinary naturalization and facilitated naturalization of young second-generation foreigners	53.82%	43.23%	5½ : 17½	No
September 26, 2004	O	Federal resolution of October 3, 2003, on citizenship acquisition for third-generation foreigners	53.83%	48.37%	6½ : 16½	No
September 26, 2004	I	Federal popular initiative of April 26, 2002, "Postal services for all"	53.53%	49.77%	9½ : 13½	No
September 26, 2004	F	Amendment of October 3, 2003, to the Federal Act on Income Replacement for Persons Serving in the Army, Civil Service, and Civil Protection (Income Replacement Act)	53.80%	55.45%		Yes
May 16, 2004	F	Amendment of October 3, 2003, to the Federal Act on Old-Age and Survivors' Insurance (11th AHV Revision)	50.82%	32.10%		No
May 16, 2004	O	Federal resolution of October 3, 2003, on financing the AHV/IV through an increase in VAT rates	50.83%	31.42%	0 : 23	No
May 16, 2004	F	Federal Act of June 20, 2003, amending regulations on marriage and family taxation, home ownership taxation, and stamp duties	50.84%	34.12%		No
February 8, 2004	G	Counter-proposal of the Federal Assembly of October 3, 2003, to the popular initiative "Avanti – for safe and efficient motorways"	45.58%	37.20%	0 : 23	No
February 8, 2004	F	Amendment of December 13, 2002, to the Code of Obligations (Rent)	45.42%	35.93%		No
February 8, 2004	I	Federal popular initiative of May 3, 2000, "Life imprisonment for untreatable, extremely dangerous sexual and violent offenders"	45.53%	56.19%	21½ : 1½	Yes
August 1, 2003	Extension of the optional treaty referendum					
May 18, 2003	F	Federal Act on the Army and Military Administration (Military Act), amendment	49.55%	76.04%		Yes
May 18, 2003	F	Federal Act on Civil Protection and Civil Defense (Civil Protection and Civil Defense Act)	49.50%	80.56%		Yes
May 18, 2003	I	Federal popular initiative "Yes to fair rents"	49.58%	32.73%	1 : 22	No
May 18, 2003	I	Federal popular initiative "For a car-free Sunday per season – a four-year trial (Sunday Initiative)"	49.80%	37.65%	0 : 23	No
May 18, 2003	I	Federal popular initiative "Health must remain affordable (Health Initiative)"	49.67%	27.09%	0 : 23	No
May 18, 2003	I	Federal popular initiative "Equal rights for the disabled"	49.69%	37.67%	3 : 20	No
May 18, 2003	I	Federal popular initiative "Power without nuclear – For an energy transition and gradual decommissioning of nuclear power plants"	49.71%	33.71%	½ : 22½	No
May 18, 2003	I	Federal popular initiative "Moratorium Plus – For extending the nuclear power plant construction ban and limiting nuclear risk"	49.59%	41.60%	1 : 22	No
May 18, 2003	I	Federal popular initiative "For sufficient vocational training opportunities (Apprenticeship Initiative)"	49.56%	31.61%	0 : 23	No
February 9, 2003	O	Federal resolution on amending popular rights	28.69%	70.35%	23 : 0	Yes
February 9, 2003	F	Federal Act on adjusting cantonal contributions for in-cantonal inpatient treatments under the Federal Act on Health Insurance	28.69%	77.36%		Yes
November 24, 2002	I	Federal popular initiative "Against asylum law abuse"	48.12%	49.91%	12½ : 10½	No
November 24, 2002	F	Amendment to the Federal Act on Compulsory Unemployment Insurance and Insolvency Compensation (Unemployment Insurance Act)	47.82%	56.09%		Yes
September 22, 2002	I	Federal popular initiative "Excess gold reserves to the AHV fund (Gold Initiative)"	45.17%	46.37%	6 : 17	No
September 22, 2002	G	"Gold for AHV, cantons, and foundation" (Counter-proposal to the popular initiative "Excess gold reserves to the AHV fund")	45.17%	48.22%	6½ : 16½	No
September 22, 2002	S	Tiebreaker question (In case of a double yes: 51.70% and 15 : 8 cantons for the counter-proposal)	45.17%			
September 22, 2002	F	Electricity Market Act	44.79%	47.42%		No
June 2, 2002	F	Amendment to the Swiss Penal Code (Abortion)	41.81%	72.15%		Yes
June 2, 2002	I	Federal popular initiative "For mother and child – For the protection of the unborn child and support for its mother in need"	41.69%	18.25%	0 : 23	No
March 3, 2002	I	Federal popular initiative "For Switzerland's accession to the United Nations (UN)"	58.44%	54.61%	12 : 11	Yes
March 3, 2002	I	Federal popular initiative "For shorter working hours"	58.26%	25.37%	0 : 23	No
December 2, 2001	O	Federal resolution on a debt brake	37.82%	84.74%	23 : 0	Yes
December 2, 2001	I	Federal popular initiative "For a secure AHV – Tax energy instead of labor!"	37.85%	22.86%	0 : 3	No
December 2, 2001	I	Federal popular initiative "For a credible security policy and a Switzerland without an army"	37.93%	21.90%	0 : 23	No
December 2, 2001	I	Federal popular initiative "Solidarity creates security: For a voluntary civilian peace service (ZFD)"	37.86%	23.21%	0 : 23	No
December 2, 2001	I	Federal popular initiative "For a capital gains tax"	37.85%	34.11%	0 : 23	No
June 10, 2001	F	Amendment of October 6, 2000, to the Federal Act on the Army and Military Administration (Military Act) (Armament)	42.52%	50.99%		Yes
June 10, 2001	F	Amendment of October 6, 2000, to the Federal Act on the Army and Military Administration (Military Act) (Training cooperation)	42.5%	51.14%		Yes
June 10, 2001	O	Federal resolution of December 15, 2000, on abolishing the approval requirement for establishing dioceses	42.05%	64.20%	23 : 0	Yes
March 4, 2001	I	Federal popular initiative "Yes to Europe"	55.79%	23.15%	0 : 23	No
March 4, 2001	I	Federal popular initiative "For lower medicine prices"	55.70%	30.85%	0 : 23	No
March 4, 2001	I	Federal popular initiative "For more road safety through a 30 km/h speed limit in urban areas with exceptions (Streets for all)"	55.79%	20.30%	0 : 23	No
November 26, 2000	I	Federal popular initiative "For a flexibilization of the AHV – Against raising the retirement age for women"	41.66%	39.47%	6 : 17	No
November 26, 2000	I	Federal popular initiative "For a flexible retirement age from 62 for women and men"	41.71%	46.54%	7 : 16	No
November 26, 2000	I	Federal popular initiative "Savings in the military and overall defense – For more peace and future-oriented jobs (Redistribution Initiative)"	41.71%	37.62%	4 : 19	No
November 26, 2000	I	Federal popular initiative "For lower hospital costs"	41.66%	17.89%	0 : 23	No
November 26, 2000	F	Federal Personnel Act	41.53%	66.83%		Yes
September 24, 2000	I	Federal popular initiative "For a solar centime (Solar Initiative)"	44.70%	31.26%	0 : 23	No
September 24, 2000	G	Constitutional article on a promotion levy for renewable energies (Counter-proposal to the popular initiative "For a solar centime (Solar Initiative)")	44.70%	45.28%	4½ : 18½	No
September 24, 2000	S	Tiebreaker question (In case of a double yes: 65.44% and 23 : 0 cantons for the counter-proposal)	44.70%			
September 24, 2000	G	Constitutional article on an environmental energy steering levy (Counter-proposal to the withdrawn "Energy-Environment Initiative")	44.89%	44.51%	2½ : 20½	No
September 24, 2000	I	Federal popular initiative "For regulating immigration"	45.26%	36.20%	0 : 23	No
September 24, 2000	I	Federal popular initiative "More rights for the people through a referendum with a counter-proposal (Constructive Referendum)"	44.8%	34.10%	0 : 23	No
May 21, 2000	F	Federal resolution on the approval of sectoral agreements between the Swiss Confederation and the European Community, as well as, where applicable, its member states or the European Atomic Energy Community	48.3%	67.19%		Yes
March 12, 2000	O	Federal resolution on judicial reform	41.92%	86.36%	23 : 0	Yes
March 12, 2000	I	Federal popular initiative "For accelerating direct democracy (Deadlines for processing popular initiatives in the form of a drafted proposal)"	42.1%	30.0%	0 : 23	No
March 12, 2000	I	Federal popular initiative "For fair representation of women in federal authorities (March 3 Initiative)"	42.18%	17.97%	0 : 23	No
March 12, 2000	I	Federal popular initiative "To protect humans from manipulations in reproductive technology (Initiative for humane reproduction)"	42.2%	28.24%	0 : 23	No
March 12, 2000	I	Federal popular initiative "For halving motorized road traffic to preserve and improve living environments (Traffic Halving Initiative)"	42.37%	21.33%	0 : 23	No

=== 1990–1999 ===
Annual overviews: 1990 | 1991 | 1992 | 1993 | 1994 | 1995 | 1996 | 1997 | 1998 | 1999

Date	Proposal title		Participation	Yes vote share	Cantons Yes : No	Result
June 13, 1999	F	Asylum Act	45.58%	70.59%		Yes
June 13, 1999	F	Federal resolution on urgent measures in the asylum and foreigners sector	45.62%	70.84%		Yes
June 13, 1999	F	Federal resolution on the medical prescription of heroin	45.74%	54.42%		Yes
June 13, 1999	F	Federal Act on Disability Insurance	45.64%	30.29%		No
June 13, 1999	F	Federal Act on Maternity Insurance	45.94%	38.99%		No
April 18, 1999	O	Federal resolution on a new Federal Constitution	35.89%	59.16%	13 : 10	Yes
February 7, 1999	O	Federal resolution on amending the eligibility requirements for the Federal Council	38.01%	74.67%	21 : 2	Yes
February 7, 1999	O	Federal resolution on the constitutional provision for transplant medicine	37.98%	87.77%	23 : 0	Yes
February 7, 1999	I	Popular initiative "Home ownership for all"	38.18%	41.32%	3 : 20	No
February 7, 1999	F	Federal Act on Spatial Planning, amendment of March 20, 1998	37.96%	55.94%		Yes
November 29, 1998	O	Federal resolution on the construction and financing of public transport infrastructure projects	38.31%	63.50%	20½ : 2½	Yes
November 29, 1998	O	Federal resolution on a temporary new grain article	38.03%	79.43%	23 : 0	Yes
November 29, 1998	I	Popular initiative "for a reasonable drug policy"	38.37%	26.01%	0 : 23	No
November 29, 1998	F	Federal Act on Labor in Industry, Commerce, and Trade (Labor Act)	38.11%	63.38%		Yes
September 27, 1998	F	Federal Act on a performance-related heavy vehicle fee (Heavy Vehicle Fee Act)	51.80%	57.20%		Yes
September 27, 1998	I	Popular initiative "for affordable food and ecological farms"	51.57%	23.00%	0 : 23	No
September 27, 1998	I	Popular initiative "for the 10th AHV revision without raising the retirement age"	51.62%	41.48%	5 : 18	No
June 7, 1998	O	Federal resolution on measures for budget balancing	40.92%	70.70%	23 : 0	Yes
June 7, 1998	I	Popular initiative "to protect life and the environment from genetic manipulation (Gene Protection Initiative)"	41.32%	33.29%	0 : 23	No
June 7, 1998	I	Popular initiative "S.o.S. – Switzerland without snooping police"	40.99%	24.59%	0 : 23	No
September 28, 1997	F	Federal resolution of December 13, 1996, on the financing of unemployment insurance	40.63%	49.18%		No
September 28, 1997	I	Popular initiative "Youth without Drugs"	40.83%	29.34%	0 : 23	No
June 8, 1997	I	Popular initiative "EU accession negotiations to the people!"	35.44%	25.95%	0 : 23	No
June 8, 1997	I	Popular initiative "for a ban on war material exports"	35.47%	22.50%	0 : 23	No
June 8, 1997	O	Federal resolution on the abolition of the powder monopoly	35.25%	82.18%	23 : 0	Yes
December 1, 1996	I	Popular initiative "against illegal immigration"	46.75%	46.34%	11 : 12	No
December 1, 1996	F	Federal Act on Labor in Industry, Commerce, and Trade (Labor Act), amendment of March 22, 1996	46.72%	32.97%		No
June 9, 1996	G	Counter-proposal of the Federal Assembly of December 21, 1995, to the popular initiative "Farmers and Consumers – for nature-friendly agriculture"	31.42%	77.59%	23 : 0	Yes
June 9, 1996	F	Government and Administration Organization Act of October 6, 1995	31.34%	39.39%		No
March 10, 1996	O	Federal resolution on the revision of the language article in the Federal Constitution (Art. 116 BV)	31.03%	76.17%	23 : 0	Yes
March 10, 1996	O	Federal resolution on the transfer of the Bernese municipality of Vellerat to the Canton of Jura	30.98%	91.64%	23 : 0	Yes
March 10, 1996	O	Federal resolution on the abolition of cantonal responsibility for the personal equipment of army members	31.02%	43.70%	3 : 20	No
March 10, 1996	O	Federal resolution on the abolition of the obligation to purchase distillation equipment and to take over brandy	30.92%	80.80%	23 : 0	Yes
March 10, 1996	O	Federal resolution on the abolition of federal contributions to railway station parking facilities	30.97%	53.95%	14 : 9	Yes
June 25, 1995	F	Federal Act on Old-Age and Survivors’ Insurance, amendment of October 7, 1994	40.41%	60.78%		Yes
June 25, 1995	I	Popular initiative "for the expansion of AHV and IV"	40.34%	27.63%	0 : 23	No
June 25, 1995	F	Federal Act on the Acquisition of Real Estate by Persons Abroad, amendment of October 7, 1994	40.34%	46.44%		No
March 12, 1995	G	Federal resolution on the popular initiative "for an environmentally sound and efficient peasant agriculture" (counter-proposal)	37.93%	49.12%	9 : 14	No
March 12, 1995	F	Dairy Industry Resolution 1988, amendment of March 18, 1994	37.93%	36.54%		No
March 12, 1995	F	Agriculture Act, amendment of October 8, 1993	37.91%	33.56%		No
March 12, 1995	O	Federal resolution on an expenditure brake	37.86%	83.38%	23 : 0	Yes
December 4, 1994	F	Federal Act on Health Insurance	43.77%	51.80%		Yes
December 4, 1994	I	Popular initiative "for a healthy health insurance"	43.75%	23.45%	0 : 23	No
December 4, 1994	F	Federal Act on Coercive Measures in Foreigners’ Law	43.81%	72.91%		Yes
September 25, 1994	O	Federal resolution on the abolition of the subsidization of domestic bread grain from customs revenues	45.50%	64.59%	23 : 0	Yes
September 25, 1994	F	Swiss Penal Code, Military Penal Code, amendment of June 18, 1993	45.90%	54.65%		Yes
June 12, 1994	O	Federal resolution on a cultural promotion article in the Federal Constitution (Art. 27septies BV)	46.61%	50.98%	11 : 12	No
June 12, 1994	O	Federal resolution on the revision of citizenship regulations in the Federal Constitution (Facilitated naturalization for young foreigners)	46.75%	52.84%	10 : 13	No
June 12, 1994	F	Federal Act on Swiss troops for peacekeeping operations	46.77%	42.77%		No
February 20, 1994	O	Federal resolution on the continuation of the national road tax	40.83%	68.48%	21 : 2	Yes
February 20, 1994	O	Federal resolution on the continuation of the heavy vehicle tax	40.81%	72.23%	23 : 0	Yes
February 20, 1994	O	Federal resolution on the introduction of a performance- or consumption-based heavy vehicle tax	40.79%	67.15%	21 : 2	Yes
February 20, 1994	I	Federal popular initiative "to protect the Alpine region from transit traffic"	40.86%	51.91%	16 : 7	Yes
February 20, 1994	F	Aviation Act, amendment of June 18, 1993	40.66%	61.07%		Yes
November 28, 1993	O	Federal resolution on the financial order	45.40%	66.66%	22 : 1	Yes
November 28, 1993	O	Federal resolution on a contribution to the recovery of federal finances	45.38%	57.72%	18 : 5	Yes
November 28, 1993	O	Federal resolution on measures to preserve social insurance	45.38%	62.59%	22 : 1	Yes
November 28, 1993	O	Federal resolution on special consumption taxes	45.38%	60.65%	20 : 3	Yes
November 28, 1993	I	Popular initiative "to reduce alcohol problems"	45.49%	25.26%	0 : 23	No
November 28, 1993	I	Popular initiative "to reduce tobacco problems"	45.50%	25.52%	0 : 23	No
September 26, 1993	O	Federal resolution against weapons misuse	39.84%	86.27%	23 : 0	Yes
September 26, 1993	O	Federal resolution on the accession of the Bernese district of Laufen to the Canton of Basel-Landschaft	39.50%	75.16%	23 : 0	Yes
September 26, 1993	I	Popular initiative "for a work-free federal holiday (1 August Initiative)"	39.88%	83.77%	23 : 0	Yes
September 26, 1993	F	Federal resolution on temporary measures against cost increases in health insurance	39.77%	80.55%		Yes
September 26, 1993	F	Federal resolution on measures in unemployment insurance	39.74%	70.40%		Yes
June 6, 1993	I	Popular initiative "40 military training sites are enough – environmental protection for the military too"	55.58%	44.71%	7 : 16	No
June 6, 1993	I	Popular initiative "for a Switzerland without new fighter jets"	55.58%	42.81%	4 : 19	No
March 7, 1993	F	Federal Act on the increase of the fuel surcharge of October 9, 1992	51.27%	54.51%		Yes
March 7, 1993	O	Federal resolution on the abolition of the gambling ban	51.25%	72.45%	23 : 0	Yes
March 7, 1993	I	Popular initiative "to abolish animal experiments"	51.22%	27.77%	0 : 23	No
December 6, 1992	O	Federal resolution on the European Economic Area (EEA)	78.73%	49.66%	7 : 16	No
September 27, 1992	F	Federal resolution on the construction of the Swiss railway Alpine transversal (Alpine Transit Resolution)	45.90%	63.61%		Yes
September 27, 1992	F	Federal Act on the Business Transactions of the Federal Assembly and on the Form, Publication, and Entry into Force of its Decrees (Business Transactions Act), amendment of October 4, 1991	45.40%	58.01%		Yes
September 27, 1992	F	Federal Act on Stamp Duties, amendment of October 4, 1991	45.66%	61.47%		Yes
September 27, 1992	F	Federal Act on Peasant Land Law	45.65%	53.57%		Yes
September 27, 1992	F	Federal Act on the Compensation of Members of the Federal Councils and Contributions to Factions (Compensation Act), amendment of October 4, 1991	45.54%	27.58%		No
September 27, 1992	F	Federal Act on Contributions to the Infrastructure Costs of Factions and Members of the Federal Councils (Infrastructure Act)	45.47%	30.59%		No
May 17, 1992	F	Federal resolution on Switzerland’s accession to the Bretton Woods institutions	38.81%	55.84%		Yes
May 17, 1992	F	Federal Act on Switzerland’s participation in the Bretton Woods institutions	38.81%	56.42%		Yes
May 17, 1992	F	Federal Act on Water Protection (Water Protection Act)	39.22%	66.08%		Yes
May 17, 1992	G	Counter-proposal of the Federal Assembly to the popular initiative "against abuses of reproductive and genetic technology in humans"	39.20%	73.83%	22 : 1	Yes
May 17, 1992	O	Federal resolution on the introduction of a civilian service for conscientious objectors	39.22%	85.52%	23 : 0	Yes
May 17, 1992	F	Swiss Penal Code, Military Penal Code (Offenses against Sexual Integrity), amendment of June 21, 1991	39.15%	73.11%		Yes
May 17, 1992	I	Popular initiative "to save our waters"	39.22%	37.06%	0 : 23	No
February 16, 1992	I	Popular initiative "for a financially sustainable health insurance (Health Insurance Initiative)"	44.40%	39.27%	1 : 22	No
February 16, 1992	I	Popular initiative "for a drastic and gradual reduction of animal experiments (Away from Animal Experiments!)"	44.50%	43.63%	3½ : 19½	No
June 2, 1991	O	Federal resolution on the reorganization of federal finances	33.27%	45.65%	2½ : 20½	No
June 2, 1991	F	Military Penal Code, amendment of October 5, 1990	33.31%	55.68%		Yes
March 3, 1991	O	Federal resolution of October 5, 1990, on lowering the voting and eligibility age to 18	31.29%	72.75%	23 : 0	Yes
March 3, 1991	I	Popular initiative "to promote public transport"	31.23%	37.15%	1½ : 21½	No
September 23, 1990	I	Popular initiative "for a phase-out of nuclear energy"	40.41%	47.13%	7 : 16	No
September 23, 1990	I	Popular initiative "Stop nuclear power plant construction (Moratorium)"	40.43%	54.52%	19½ : 3½	Yes
September 23, 1990	O	Federal resolution of October 6, 1989, on the energy article in the Federal Constitution	40.34%	71.10%	23 : 0	Yes
September 23, 1990	F	Federal Act on Road Traffic, amendment of October 6, 1989	40.29%	52.80%		Yes
April 1, 1990	I	Popular initiative "Stop concrete – for a limit on road construction!"	41.13%	28.51%	0 : 23	No
April 1, 1990	I	Popular initiative "for a motorway-free landscape between Murten and Yverdon"	41.09%	32.72%	0 : 23	No
April 1, 1990	I	Popular initiative "for a motorway-free Knonau District"	41.13%	31.37%	0 : 23	No
April 1, 1990	I	Popular initiative "for a free Aare landscape between Biel and Solothurn/Zuchwil" (Cloverleaf Initiative)	41.06%	34.04%	0 : 23	No
April 1, 1990	F	Federal resolution of June 23, 1989, on viticulture	40.81%	46.66%		No
April 1, 1990	O	Federal Act on the Organization of Federal Justice, amendment of June 23, 1989	40.41%	47.36%		No

=== 1980–1989 ===
Annual overviews: 1980 | 1981 | 1982 | 1983 | 1984 | 1985 | 1986 | 1987 | 1988 | 1989

Date	Proposal title		Participation	Yes vote share	Cantons Yes : No	Result
November 26, 1989	I	Federal popular initiative "For a Switzerland without an army and for a comprehensive peace policy"	69.18%	35.59%	2 : 21	No
November 26, 1989	I	Federal popular initiative "Pro speed limit 130/100"	69.15%	38.02%	6 : 17	No
June 4, 1989	I	Federal popular initiative "For nature-friendly farming – against factory farming (Small Farmers Initiative)"	35.95%	48.95%	8 : 15	No
December 4, 1988	I	Federal "City-Country Initiative against land speculation"	52.83%	30.78%	0 : 23	No
December 4, 1988	I	Federal popular initiative "To reduce working hours"	52.86%	34.27%	2 : 21	No
December 4, 1988	I	Federal popular initiative "To limit immigration"	52.84%	32.70%	0 : 23	No
June 12, 1988	O	Federal resolution of March 20, 1987, on constitutional foundations for a coordinated transport policy	41.91%	45.51%	4 : 19	No
June 12, 1988	I	Federal popular initiative "To lower the AHV retirement age to 62 for men and 60 for women"	42.04%	35.12%	2 : 21	No
December 6, 1987	F	Federal resolution of December 19, 1986, on the BAHN 2000 concept	47.68%	56.99%		Yes
December 6, 1987	I	Federal popular initiative "For the protection of moors – Rothenthurm Initiative"	47.66%	57.76%	20 : 3	Yes
December 6, 1987	F	Federal Act on Health Insurance, amendment of March 20, 1987	47.65%	28.72%		No
April 5, 1987	F	Asylum Act, amendment of June 20, 1986	42.38%	67.34%		Yes
April 5, 1987	F	Federal Act on the Residence and Establishment of Foreigners, amendment of June 20, 1986	42.24%	65.71%		Yes
April 5, 1987	I	Federal popular initiative "For the people's right to co-decide on military spending (Armament referendum)"	42.41%	40.56%	2½ : 20½	No
April 5, 1987	O	Federal resolution of December 19, 1986, on the voting procedure for popular initiatives with counter-proposals	42.25%	63.27%	21 : 2	Yes
December 7, 1986	G	Federal resolution of March 21, 1986, on the popular initiative "For tenant protection" (Counter-proposal)	34.70%	64.37%	18½ : 4½	Yes
December 7, 1986	I	Federal popular initiative "For a fair taxation of heavy traffic (Heavy traffic levy)"	34.74%	33.87%	0 : 23	No
September 28, 1986	I	Federal resolution of December 20, 1985, on the "Federal Culture Initiative"	34.74%	16.66%	0 : 23	No
September 28, 1986	G	Counter-proposal to the "Federal Culture Initiative"	34.74%	39.30%	0 : 23	No
September 28, 1986	I	Federal popular initiative "For secured vocational training and retraining"	34.81%	18.38%	0 : 23	No
September 28, 1986	F	Federal resolution on the domestic sugar industry, amendment of June 21, 1985	34.90%	38.16%		No
March 16, 1986	O	Federal resolution of December 14, 1984, on Switzerland's accession to the United Nations	50.72%	24.33%	0 : 23	No
December 1, 1985	I	Federal popular initiative "For the abolition of vivisection"	37.97%	29.47%	0 : 23	No
September 22, 1985	G	Federal resolution of October 5, 1984, on the popular initiative "For the coordination of the school year start in all cantons" (Counter-proposal)	41.00%	58.85%	16 : 7	Yes
September 22, 1985	F	Federal resolution of October 5, 1984, on innovation risk guarantees for small and medium-sized enterprises	40.86%	43.11%		No
September 22, 1985	F	Swiss Civil Code (General effects of marriage, matrimonial property law, and inheritance law), amendment of October 5, 1984	41.09%	54.72%		Yes
June 9, 1985	I	Federal popular initiative "Right to life"	35.72%	30.96%	5½ : 17½	No
June 9, 1985	O	Federal resolution of October 5, 1984, on the abolition of cantonal shares in the net proceeds of stamp duties	35.24%	66.52%	22 : 1	Yes
June 9, 1985	O	Federal resolution of October 5, 1984, on the redistribution of net proceeds from the fiscal taxation of spirits	35.25%	72.31%	22 : 1	Yes
June 9, 1985	O	Federal resolution of December 14, 1984, on the abolition of support for self-sufficiency in bread grain	35.31%	57.04%	18½ : 4½	Yes
March 10, 1985	O	Federal resolution of October 5, 1984, on the abolition of contributions for primary school education	34.38%	58.47%	18 : 5	Yes
March 10, 1985	O	Federal resolution of October 5, 1984, on the abolition of the Confederation's contribution obligation in healthcare	34.77%	52.99%	13 : 10	Yes
March 10, 1985	O	Federal resolution of October 5, 1984, on training contributions	34.77%	47.63%	8½ : 14½	No
March 10, 1985	I	Federal popular initiative "For an extension of paid holidays (Holiday Initiative)"	34.97%	34.78%	2 : 21	No
December 2, 1984	I	Federal popular initiative "For effective maternity protection"	37.63%	15.78%	0 : 23	No
December 2, 1984	O	Federal resolution of June 23, 1984, on a radio and television article	37.54%	68.74%	23 : 0	Yes
December 2, 1984	G	Federal resolution of June 22, 1984, on the popular initiative "For compensation of victims of violent crimes" (Counter-proposal)	37.61%	82.09%	23 : 0	Yes
September 23, 1984	I	Federal popular initiative "For a future without new nuclear power plants"	41.65%	45.03%	6 : 17	No
September 23, 1984	I	Federal popular initiative "For a safe, economical, and environmentally friendly energy supply"	41.61%	45.77%	6 : 17	No
May 20, 1984	I	Federal popular initiative "Against the abuse of bank secrecy and banking power"	42.52%	26.96%	0 : 23	No
May 20, 1984	I	Federal popular initiative "Against the sell-off of the homeland"	42.47%	48.92%	8½ : 14½	No
February 26, 1984	O	Federal resolution of June 24, 1983, on the introduction of a heavy traffic levy	52.75%	58.70%	15½ : 7½	Yes
February 26, 1984	O	Federal resolution of June 24, 1983, on a fee for the use of national roads	52.77%	52.98%	16 : 7	Yes
February 26, 1984	I	Federal popular initiative "For a genuine civilian service based on proof of action"	52.75%	36.17%	1½ : 21½	No
December 4, 1983	O	Federal resolution of June 24, 1983, on amendments to the citizenship regulations in the Federal Constitution	35.83%	60.81%	20½ : 2½	Yes
December 4, 1983	O	Federal resolution of June 24, 1983, on facilitating certain naturalizations	35.86%	44.83%	5 : 18	No
February 27, 1983	O	Federal resolution of October 8, 1982, on the revision of fuel duties	32.41%	52.69%	15½ : 7½	Yes
February 27, 1983	O	Federal resolution of October 8, 1982, on the energy article in the Federal Constitution	32.38%	50.92%	11 : 12	No
November 28, 1982	I	Federal resolution of March 19, 1982, on the popular initiative "To prevent abusive prices"	32.91%	56.13%	17 : 6	Yes
November 28, 1982	G	Counter-proposal to the popular initiative "To prevent abusive prices"	32.91%	21.59%	0 : 23	No
June 6, 1982	F	Foreigners Act of June 19, 1981	35.18%	49.64%		No
June 6, 1982	F	Swiss Penal Code, amendment of October 9, 1981 (Violent crimes)	35.18%	63.71%		Yes
November 29, 1981	O	Federal resolution of June 19, 1981, on the continuation of the financial order and the improvement of the federal budget	30.35%	68.95%	23 : 0	Yes
June 14, 1981	G	Federal resolution of October 10, 1980, on the popular initiative "Equal rights for men and women" (Counter-proposal)	33.93%	60.27%	15½ : 7½	Yes
June 14, 1981	G	Federal resolution of October 10, 1980, on the popular initiative "To safeguard consumer rights" (Counter-proposal)	33.88%	65.55%	20 : 3	Yes
April 5, 1981	I	Mitenand Initiative for a new foreigners policy	39.88%	16.22%	0 : 23	No
November 30, 1980	F	Federal Act on Road Traffic, amendment of March 21, 1980 (Seat belts and helmets)	42.06%	51.6%		Yes
November 30, 1980	O	Federal resolution of June 20, 1980, on the abolition of cantonal shares in the net proceeds of stamp duties	41.86%	67.30%	20 : 3	Yes
November 30, 1980	O	Federal resolution of June 20, 1980, on the redistribution of net revenues of the Federal Alcohol Administration from the fiscal taxation of spirits	41.88%	71.04%	21 : 2	Yes
November 30, 1980	O	Federal resolution of June 20, 1980, on the revision of the bread grain order of the country	41.91%	63.54%	20 : 3	Yes
March 2, 1980	I	Federal popular initiative "Concerning the complete separation of church and state"	34.66%	21.10%	0 : 23	No
March 2, 1980	O	Federal resolution of June 22, 1979, on the reorganization of national supply	34.45%	86.05%	23 : 0	Yes

=== 1970–1979 ===
Annual overviews: 1970 | 1971 | 1972 | 1973 | 1974 | 1975 | 1976 | 1977 | 1978 | 1979

Date	Proposal title		Participation	Yes vote share	Cantons Yes : No	Result
May 20, 1979	O	Federal resolution of December 15, 1978, on the reorganization of turnover tax and direct federal tax	37.65%	34.59%	0 : 23	No
May 20, 1979	F	Federal resolution of October 6, 1978, on the Nuclear Energy Act	37.63%	68.86%		Yes
February 18, 1979	O	Federal resolution of June 23, 1978, on voting and eligibility rights for 18-year-olds	49.58%	49.19%	9 : 14	No
February 18, 1979	G	Federal resolution of October 6, 1978, on the popular initiative "To promote footpaths and hiking trails" (Counter-proposal)	49.54%	77.58%	22 : 1	Yes
February 18, 1979	I	Federal popular initiative "Against advertising of addictive substances"	49.54%	40.96%	½ : 22½	No
February 18, 1979	I	Federal popular initiative "To safeguard people's rights and safety in the construction and operation of nuclear facilities"	49.58%	48.80%	9 : 14	No
January 1, 1979	Establishment of the Canton of Jura as the 26th canton					
December 3, 1978	F	Dairy industry resolution of October 7, 1977	43.15%	68.50%		Yes
December 3, 1978	F	Animal Protection Act of March 9, 1978	43.27%	81.70%		Yes
December 3, 1978	F	Federal Act of March 9, 1978, on the performance of federal security police tasks	43.27%	44.02%		No
December 3, 1978	F	Federal Act of April 19, 1978, on vocational education	43.15%	56.04%		Yes
September 24, 1978	O	Federal resolution of March 9, 1978, on the establishment of the Canton of Jura	42.04%	82.29%	22 : 0	Yes
July 1, 1978	Introduction of an 18-month maximum period for collecting signatures for popular initiatives after publication of the initiative text in the Federal Gazette					
May 28, 1978	F	Time Act of June 24, 1977	49.00%	47.91%		No
May 28, 1978	F	Customs Tariff Act, amendment of October 7, 1977	48.70%	54.81%		Yes
May 28, 1978	F	Federal Act of June 24, 1977, on the protection of pregnancy and the criminalization of abortion	48.86%	31.20%		No
May 28, 1978	F	Federal Act of October 7, 1977, on the promotion of universities and research	48.90%	43.32%		No
May 28, 1978	I	Federal popular initiative "For 12 car-free Sundays per year"	49.13%	36.28%	0 : 22	No
February 26, 1978	I	Federal popular initiative "For greater co-determination of the Federal Assembly and the Swiss people in national road construction"	48.54%	38.68%	0 : 22	No
February 26, 1978	F	Federal Act on Old-Age and Survivors' Insurance, amendment of June 24, 1977 (9th AHV Revision)	48.31%	65.58%		Yes
February 26, 1978	I	Federal popular initiative "To lower the AHV retirement age"	48.33%	20.62%	0 : 22	No
February 26, 1978	O	Federal resolution of October 7, 1977, on the economic cycle article of the Federal Constitution	48.00%	68.36%	22 : 0	Yes
December 26, 1977	Increase in the number of signatures required to 50,000 for a referendum and 100,000 for a constitutional initiative					
December 4, 1977	I	Federal popular initiative "For tax harmonization, increased wealth taxation, and relief for lower incomes (Wealth Tax Initiative)"	38.29%	44.36%	2½ : 19½	No
December 4, 1977	F	Federal Act of December 17, 1976, on political rights	38.11%	59.43%		No
December 4, 1977	O	Federal resolution of May 5, 1977, on the introduction of a civilian alternative service	38.27%	37.60%	0 : 22	No
December 4, 1977	F	Federal Act of May 5, 1977, on measures to balance the federal budget	38.15%	62.43%		Yes
September 25, 1977	I	Federal resolution of March 25, 1977, on the popular initiative "For effective tenant protection"	51.59%	42.24%	3½ : 18½	No
September 25, 1977	G	Counter-proposal to the popular initiative "For effective tenant protection"	51.59%	41.22%	7 : 15	No
September 25, 1977	I	Federal popular initiative "Against air pollution by motor vehicles"	51.36%	39.03%	1½ : 20½	No
September 25, 1977	O	Federal resolution of March 25, 1977, on increasing the number of signatures for a referendum (Art. 89 and 89bis of the Federal Constitution)	51.61%	57.85%	18 : 4	Yes
September 25, 1977	O	Federal resolution of March 25, 1977, on increasing the number of signatures for a constitutional initiative (Art. 120 and 121 of the Federal Constitution)	52.00%	56.71%	19 : 3	Yes
September 25, 1977	I	Federal popular initiative "For the deadline solution"	51.93%	48.30%	7 : 15	No
June 12, 1977	O	Federal resolution of December 17, 1976, on the reorganization of turnover tax and direct federal tax	50.02%	40.52%	1 : 21	No
June 12, 1977	O	Federal resolution of December 17, 1976, on tax harmonization	49.91%	61.32%	17½ : 4½	Yes
March 13, 1977	I	Republican popular petition "To protect Switzerland" (4th Overforeignization Initiative)	45.20%	29.65%	0 : 22	No
March 13, 1977	I	Popular petition "To restrict naturalizations" (5th Overforeignization Initiative)	45.22%	33.76%	0 : 22	No
March 13, 1977	I	Federal resolution of December 17, 1976, on the reorganization of the treaty referendum: Popular initiative "Against the restriction of voting rights on international treaties"	44.95%	21.9%	0 : 19½	No
March 13, 1977	G	Counter-proposal to the popular initiative "Against the restriction of voting rights on international treaties"	44.95%	61.02%	20½ : 1½	Yes
December 5, 1976	O	Federal resolution of December 19, 1975, on monetary and credit policy	44.83%	70.35%	22 : 0	Yes
December 5, 1976	O	Federal resolution of December 19, 1975, on price surveillance	45.04%	82.02%	22 : 0	Yes
December 5, 1976	I	Federal popular initiative "To introduce a 40-hour workweek"	45.15%	21.96%	0 : 22	No
September 26, 1976	O	Federal resolution of March 19, 1976, on a constitutional article on radio and television	33.50%	43.29%	3½ : 18½	No
September 26, 1976	I	Popular petition to introduce mandatory liability insurance for motor vehicles and bicycles by the Confederation	33.54%	24.30%	0 : 22	No
June 13, 1976	F	Federal Act of October 4, 1974, on spatial planning	34.56%	48.90%		No
June 13, 1976	F	Federal resolution of June 20, 1975, on an agreement between Switzerland and the International Development Association (IDA) for a 200 million franc loan	34.52%	43.55%		No
June 13, 1976	O	Federal resolution of March 11, 1976, on a new concept for unemployment insurance	34.52%	68.27%	21 : 1	Yes
March 21, 1976	I	Federal resolution of October 4, 1976, on the popular petition for co-determination	39.45%	32.38%	0 : 22	No
March 21, 1976	G	Counter-proposal to the popular petition for co-determination	39.45%	29.61%	0 : 22	No
March 21, 1976	I	Popular petition for fairer taxation and the abolition of tax privileges	39.31%	42.22%	½ : 21½	No
December 7, 1975	O	Federal resolution of December 13, 1974, on amending the Federal Constitution (Freedom of establishment and support regulations)	30.89%	75.62%	22 : 0	Yes
December 7, 1975	O	Federal resolution of June 20, 1975, on amending the Federal Constitution in the field of water management	30.93%	77.52%	21 : 1	Yes
December 7, 1975	F	Federal Act of December 13, 1974, on the import and export of products from agricultural produce	31.22%	52.0%		Yes
June 8, 1975	O	Federal resolution on currency protection, amendment of June 28, 1974	36.81%	85.52%	22 : 0	Yes
June 8, 1975	F	Federal resolution on the financing of national roads, amendment of October 4, 1974	36.81%	53.46%		Yes
June 8, 1975	F	Federal Act of October 4, 1974, on amending the general customs tariff	36.79%	48.23%		No
June 8, 1975	O	Federal resolution of January 31, 1975, on increasing tax revenues from 1976	36.81%	55.96%	17 : 5	Yes
June 8, 1975	O	Federal resolution of January 31, 1975, on making expenditure decisions more difficult	36.81%	75.94%	22 : 0	Yes
March 2, 1975	O	Federal resolution of October 4, 1974, on the economic cycle article of the Federal Constitution	28.59%	52.77%	11 : 11	No
December 8, 1974	O	Federal resolution of October 4, 1974, to improve the federal budget	39.58%	44.39%	4 : 18	No
December 8, 1974	O	Federal resolution of October 4, 1974, on making expenditure decisions more difficult	39.54%	67.00%	22 : 0	Yes
December 8, 1974	I	Federal resolution of March 22, 1974, on the popular petition for social health insurance and amending the Federal Constitution in the field of health, accident, and maternity insurance	39.72%	26.71%	0 : 22	No
December 8, 1974	G	Counter-proposal to the popular petition for social health insurance	39.72%	31.8%	0 : 19½	No
October 20, 1974	I	Popular petition against overforeignization and overpopulation of Switzerland	70.33%	34.19%	0 : 22	No
December 2, 1973	O	Federal resolution of December 20, 1972, on measures for price surveillance	35.02%	59.76%	20 : 2	Yes
December 2, 1973	O	Federal resolution of December 20, 1972, on measures in the field of credit	34.99%	65.12%	18½ : 3½	Yes
December 2, 1973	O	Federal resolution of December 20, 1972, on measures to stabilize the construction market	35.00%	70.39%	20 : 2	Yes
December 2, 1973	O	Federal resolution of December 20, 1972, on restricting tax-effective deductions for federal, cantonal, and municipal income taxes	34.95%	68.05%	19½ : 2½	Yes
December 2, 1973	O	Federal resolution of June 27, 1973, on an animal protection article replacing the previous Article 25bis of the Federal Constitution	34.99%	83.95%	22 : 0	Yes
May 20, 1973	O	Federal resolution of October 6, 1972, on the repeal of the Jesuit and monastery articles of the Federal Constitution (Art. 51 and 52)	40.29%	54.94%	16½ : 5½	Yes
March 4, 1973	O	Federal resolution of October 6, 1972, on amending the Federal Constitution regarding education	27.50%	52.75%	10½ : 11½	No
March 4, 1973	O	Federal resolution of October 6, 1972, on supplementing the Federal Constitution regarding the promotion of scientific research	27.51%	64.51%	19 : 3	Yes
December 3, 1972	I	Federal resolution of June 30, 1972, on the popular petition for a genuine people's pension and amending the Federal Constitution in the field of old-age, survivors', and disability provision	52.93%	15.63%	0 : 22	No
December 3, 1972	G	Counter-proposal to the popular petition for a people's pension	52.93%	73.95%	22 : 0	Yes
December 3, 1972	O	Federal resolution of October 6, 1972, on agreements between the Swiss Confederation and the European Economic Community and the member states of the European Coal and Steel Community	52.90%	72.53%	22 : 0	Yes
September 24, 1972	I	Popular petition on increased arms control and a weapons export ban	33.34%	49.67%	7 : 15	No
June 4, 1972	O	Federal resolution of June 25, 1971, on measures to stabilize the construction market	26.73%	83.35%	22 : 0	Yes
June 4, 1972	O	Federal resolution of October 8, 1971, on currency protection	26.71%	87.73%	22 : 0	Yes
March 5, 1972	I	Federal resolution of December 17, 1971, on supplementing the Federal Constitution with Article 34sexies on housing construction and on the popular petition to establish a housing fund (Denner Initiative)	35.70%	28.95%	0 : 22	No
March 5, 1972	G	Counter-proposal to the Denner Initiative	35.70%	58.47%	21 : 1	Yes
March 5, 1972	O	Federal resolution of December 17, 1971, on supplementing the Federal Constitution with Article 34septies on the general binding declaration of rental contracts and measures to protect tenants	35.70%	85.40%	22 : 0	Yes
June 6, 1971	O	Federal resolution of December 18, 1970, on supplementing the Federal Constitution with Article 24septies on the protection of humans and their natural environment against harmful or nuisance effects	37.84%	92.70%	22 : 0	Yes
June 6, 1971	O	Federal resolution of March 11, 1971, on the continuation of the federal financial order	37.75%	72.75%	22 : 0	Yes
Introduction of women's suffrage
February 7, 1971	O	Federal resolution of October 9, 1970, on the introduction of women's voting and eligibility rights in federal matters	57.72%	65.73%	15½ : 6½	Yes
November 15, 1970	O	Federal resolution of June 24, 1970, on amending the federal financial order	41.38%	55.39%	9 : 13	No
September 27, 1970	O	Federal resolution of March 18, 1970, on supplementing the Federal Constitution with Article 27quinquies on the promotion of gymnastics and sports	43.77%	74.63%	22 : 0	Yes
September 27, 1970	I	Popular petition for the right to housing and the expansion of family protection	43.81%	48.92%	8 : 14	No
June 7, 1970	I	Popular petition against overforeignization (Schwarzenbach Initiative)	74.72%	45.99%	7 : 15	No
February 1, 1970	F	Federal resolution of June 27, 1969, on the domestic sugar industry	43.75%	54.24%		Yes

=== 1960–1969 ===
Annual overviews: 1960 | 1961 | 1962 | 1963 | 1964 | 1965 | 1966 | 1967 | 1968 | 1969

Date	Proposal title		Participation	Yes vote share	Cantons Yes : No	Result
September 14, 1969	O	Federal resolution of March 21, 1969, on supplementing the Federal Constitution with Articles 22ter and 22quater (Constitutional regulation of land law)	32.93%	55.93%	19½ : 2½	Yes
June 1, 1969	F	Federal Act of October 4, 1968, on the Swiss Federal Institutes of Technology	33.91%	34.48%		No
May 19, 1968	F	Federal Act of October 5, 1967, on tobacco taxation	36.91%	48.25%		No
February 18, 1968	O	Federal resolution of October 5, 1967, on the introduction of a general tax amnesty	41.79%	61.82%	22 : 0	Yes
July 2, 1967	I	Popular initiative against land speculation	37.97%	32.69%	1 : 21	No
October 16, 1966	O	Federal resolution of March 25, 1966, on supplementing the Federal Constitution with Article 45bis on Swiss citizens abroad	47.86%	68.06%	22 : 0	Yes
October 16, 1966	I	Popular initiative to combat alcoholism	48.04%	23.37%	0 : 22	No
May 16, 1965	F	Federal Act of October 2, 1964, amending the Federal Assembly’s resolution on milk, dairy products, and edible fats (Milk resolution)	37.22%	61.99%		Yes
February 28, 1965	O	Federal resolution of March 13, 1964, on combating inflation through measures in the money and capital markets and credit system	59.66%	57.72%	18½ : 3½	Yes
February 28, 1965	O	Federal resolution of March 13, 1964, on combating inflation through measures in the construction industry	59.70%	55.54%	17 : 5	Yes
December 6, 1964	O	Federal resolution of October 9, 1964, on the continuation of temporary price control measures	39.20%	79.47%	22 : 0	Yes
May 24, 1964	F	Federal Act of September 20, 1963, on vocational education	37.02%	68.61%		Yes
February 2, 1964	O	Federal resolution of September 27, 1963, on the introduction of a general tax amnesty on January 1, 1965	44.27%	41.97%	3½ : 18½	No
December 8, 1963	O	Federal resolution of September 27, 1963, on the continuation of the federal financial order (extension of Article 41ter of the Federal Constitution and reduction of the military tax)	41.81%	77.61%	22 : 0	Yes
December 8, 1963	O	Federal resolution of June 21, 1963, on supplementing the Federal Constitution with Article 27quater on scholarships and other educational grants	41.75%	78.48%	22 : 0	Yes
May 26, 1963	I	Popular initiative for the people’s right to decide on the equipping of the Swiss army with nuclear weapons	48.79%	37.79%	4½ : 17½	No
November 4, 1962	O	Federal resolution of June 15, 1962, on amending Article 72 of the Federal Constitution (National Council election)	36.31%	63.69%	16 : 6	Yes
May 27, 1962	O	Federal resolution of December 21, 1961, on supplementing the Federal Constitution with Article 24sexies on nature and heritage protection	38.77%	79.11%	22 : 0	Yes
May 27, 1962	F	Federal Act of December 21, 1961, amending the Federal Act on daily allowances and travel expenses for the National Council and commissions of the Federal Councils	38.77%	31.68%		No
April 1, 1962	I	Popular initiative for a ban on nuclear weapons	55.59%	34.82%	4 : 18	No
December 3, 1961	F	Federal resolution of June 23, 1961, on the Swiss watch industry (Watch Statute)	45.88%	66.70%		Yes
October 22, 1961	I	Popular initiative for the introduction of legislative initiative at the federal level	40.09%	29.44%	0 : 22	No
March 5, 1961	O	Federal resolution of December 14, 1960, on supplementing the Federal Constitution with Article 26bis on pipeline facilities for the transport of liquid or gaseous fuels	62.81%	71.43%	22 : 0	Yes
March 5, 1961	F	Federal resolution of September 29, 1960, on the imposition of a fuel surcharge to finance national roads	63.25%	46.55%		No
December 4, 1960	F	Federal resolution of June 30, 1960, amending the federal resolution on additional economic and financial measures in the dairy industry	49.79%	56.34%		Yes
May 29, 1960	O	Federal resolution of March 24, 1960, on the continuation of temporary price control measures	38.99%	77.54%	22 : 0	Yes

=== 1950–1959 ===
Annual overviews: 1950 | 1951 | 1952 | 1953 | 1954 | 1955 | 1956 | 1957 | 1958 | 1959

Date	Proposal title		Participation	Yes vote share	Cantons Yes : No	Result
May 24, 1959	O	Federal resolution of December 17, 1958, on supplementing the Federal Constitution with Article 22bis on civil protection	42.86%	62.26%	22 : 0	Yes
February 1, 1959	O	Federal resolution of June 13, 1958, on the introduction of women's voting and eligibility rights in federal matters	66.72%	33.08%	3 : 19	No
December 7, 1958	O	Federal resolution of September 26, 1958, on amending the Federal Constitution (casino games)	46.24%	59.89%	20½ : 1½	Yes
December 7, 1958	F	Federal resolution of December 20, 1957, approving the agreement between Switzerland and Italy on the utilization of the Spöl hydropower	46.40%	75.18%		Yes
October 26, 1958	I	Popular initiative for a 44-hour workweek (working time reduction)	61.84%	34.99%	½ : 21½	No
July 6, 1958	O	Federal resolution of March 21, 1958, on supplementing the Federal Constitution with Article 27ter on the film industry	42.34%	61.26%	20½ : 1½	Yes
July 6, 1958	G	Federal resolution of March 21, 1958, on the popular initiative for improving the road network (counter-proposal)	42.40%	84.96%	21 : 1	Yes
May 11, 1958	O	Federal resolution of January 31, 1958, on the constitutional reorganization of the federal financial system	53.22%	54.58%	17½ : 4½	Yes
January 26, 1958	I	Popular initiative against the abuse of economic power	51.79%	25.89%	0 : 22	No
November 24, 1957	O	Federal resolution of September 20, 1957, on supplementing the Federal Constitution with Article 24quinquies on nuclear energy and radiation protection	45.45%	77.33%	22 : 0	Yes
November 24, 1957	O	Federal resolution of October 1, 1957, on the temporary extension of the transitional provisions on the country’s grain supply	45.47%	62.67%	21½ : ½	Yes
March 3, 1957	O	Federal resolution of December 21, 1956, on supplementing the Federal Constitution with Article 22bis on civil protection	53.09%	48.09%	14 : 8	No
March 3, 1957	O	Federal resolution of December 21, 1956, on supplementing the Federal Constitution with Article 36bis on radio and television	52.95%	42.76%	10½ : 11½	No
September 30, 1956	O	Federal resolution of June 27, 1956, on revising the country’s grain supply system	43.95%	38.75%	5½ : 16½	No
September 30, 1956	G	Federal resolution of June 27, 1956, on the popular initiative regarding expenditure decisions of the Federal Assembly (counter-proposal)	43.83%	45.52%	9 : 13	No
May 13, 1956	I	Popular initiative to expand people’s rights in granting water rights concessions by the Confederation	52.09%	36.92%	2½ : 19½	No
May 13, 1956	F	Federal resolution of September 30, 1955, on measures to strengthen the economy of the Canton of Graubünden by providing aid to the Holzverzuckerungs-AG	52.63%	42.46%		No
March 4, 1956	O	Federal resolution of December 22, 1955, on the temporary continuation of limited price controls (extension of the validity of the constitutional amendment of September 26, 1952)	49.40%	77.54%	22 : 0	Yes
March 13, 1955	I	Federal resolution of December 22, 1954, on the popular initiative “to protect tenants and consumers (continuation of price controls)”	55.52%	50.24%	7 : 15	No
March 13, 1955	G	Counter-proposal to the popular initiative “to protect tenants and consumers”	55.52%	40.68%	8½ : 13½	No
December 5, 1954	I	Popular initiative to protect the Rheinfall-Rheinau river landscape	51.88%	31.24%	1 : 21	No
October 24, 1954	O	Federal resolution of June 25, 1954, on the financial order for 1955 to 1958	46.77%	69.99%	21 : 1	Yes
June 20, 1954	F	Federal resolution of December 23, 1953, on professional certification in the shoemaking, hairdressing, saddlery, and wagon-making trades	40.95%	33.05%		No
June 20, 1954	F	Federal resolution of December 23, 1953, on extraordinary aid to war-damaged Swiss citizens abroad	40.65%	44.05%		No
December 6, 1953	O	Federal resolution of September 25, 1953, on the constitutional reorganization of the federal financial system	60.27%	42.04%	3 : 19	No
December 6, 1953	O	Federal resolution of September 30, 1953, on supplementing the Federal Constitution with Article 24quater on protecting waters against pollution	59.15%	81.32%	22 : 0	Yes
April 19, 1953	F	Federal Act of June 20, 1952, revising the Federal Act on postal services	52.65%	36.46%		No
November 23, 1952	O	Federal resolution of September 26, 1952, on the temporary continuation of limited price controls	56.41%	62.81%	16 : 6	Yes
November 23, 1952	O	Federal resolution of September 26, 1952, on the country’s grain supply	56.41%	75.63%	21½ : ½	Yes
October 5, 1952	F	Federal resolution of March 28, 1952, on the installation of air raid shelters in existing buildings	52.63%	15.49%		No
October 5, 1952	F	Federal Act of February 1, 1952, amending provisions on tobacco taxation in the Federal Act on Old-Age and Survivors’ Insurance	52.63%	67.99%		Yes
July 6, 1952	O	Federal resolution of March 28, 1952, on covering defense expenditures	44.2%	42.02%	3 : 19	No
May 18, 1952	I	Popular initiative on arms financing and protection of social achievements	53.90%	43.74%	4 : 18	No
April 20, 1952	I	Popular initiative on sales taxes	49.11%	18.97%	0 : 22	No
March 30, 1952	F	Federal Act on promoting agriculture and preserving the farming community (Agriculture Act)	64.15%	54.05%		Yes
March 2, 1952	F	Federal resolution on extending the validity of the federal resolution on the licensing requirement for opening and expanding inns	40.09%	46.08%		No
July 8, 1951	I	Federal popular initiative “to involve public enterprises in contributing to national defense costs”	37.58%	32.65%	0 : 22	No
April 15, 1951	I	Federal resolution on the popular initiative to revise Article 39 of the Federal Constitution (Free Money Initiative)	53.09%	12.45%	0 : 22	No
April 15, 1951	G	Counter-proposal to the Free Money Initiative	53.09%	68.99%	22 : 0	Yes
February 25, 1951	F	Federal resolution on the transport of persons and goods by motor vehicles on public roads (Road Transport Regulation)	52.40%	44.32%		No
December 3, 1950	O	Federal resolution amending Article 72 of the Federal Constitution (National Council election)	55.68%	67.33%	20 : 2	Yes
December 3, 1950	O	Federal resolution on the financial order for 1951 to 1954	55.68%	69.46%	20 : 2	Yes
October 1, 1950	I	Federal popular initiative “to protect land and labor by preventing speculation”	43.66%	27.01%	0 : 22	No
June 4, 1950	O	Federal resolution on the constitutional reorganization of the federal financial system	55.34%	35.51%	6 : 16	No
January 29, 1950	F	Federal resolution on extending the validity and amending the federal resolution on measures to promote housing construction	52.81%	46.29%		No

=== 1940–1949 ===
Annual overviews: 1940 | 1941 | 1942 | 1944 | 1945 | 1946 | 1947 | 1948 | 1949

Date	Proposal title		Participation	Yes vote share	Cantons Yes : No	Result
December 11, 1949	F	Federal Act amending the Federal Act of June 30, 1927, on the employment conditions of federal employees	72.01%	55.28%		Yes
September 11, 1949	I	Federal popular initiative “for the return to direct democracy”	42.52%	50.74%	12½ : 9½	Yes
May 22, 1949	O	Federal resolution revising Article 39 of the Federal Constitution concerning the Swiss National Bank	61.04%	38.51%	1½ : 20½	No
May 22, 1949	O	Federal law supplementing the Federal Act of June 13, 1928 on measures against tuberculosis	61.04%	24.85%	0 : 22	No

=== 1930–1939 ===
Annual overviews: 1930 | 1931 | 1933 | 1934 | 1935 | 1937 | 1938 | 1939

Date	Proposal title		Participation	Yes vote share	Cantons Yes : No	Result
December 3, 1939	F	Federal Act on the amendment of the employment relationship and insurance of federal personnel	63.86%	37.63%		No
June 4, 1939	O	Federal resolution on supplementing the Federal Constitution for the opening and partial coverage of credits for the expansion of national defense and combating unemployment	54.72%	69.07%	19 : 3	Yes
January 22, 1939	I	Popular initiative "to safeguard the constitutional rights of citizens (expansion of constitutional jurisdiction)"	46.54%	28.92%	0 : 22	No
January 22, 1939	G	Federal resolution on the popular demand for restricting the application of the urgency clause (counter-proposal)	46.54%	69.06%	21 : 1	Yes
November 27, 1938	O	Federal resolution on the transitional financial budget	60.34%	72.26%	21 : 1	Yes
July 3, 1938	F	Swiss Penal Code	57.06%	53.46%		Yes
February 20, 1938	O	Federal resolution on the revision of Articles 107 and 116 of the Federal Constitution (recognition of Romansh as a national language)	54.33%	91.59%	22 : 0	Yes
February 20, 1938	I	Popular initiative "on urgent federal resolutions and the safeguarding of democratic popular rights"	54.33%	15.22%	0 : 22	No
February 20, 1938	I	Federal resolution on the popular initiative "Private Armaments Industry"	54.33%	11.52%	0 : 22	No
February 20, 1938	G	Counter-proposal to the popular initiative "Private Armaments Industry"	54.33%	68.82%	22 : 0	Yes
November 28, 1937	I	Popular initiative "for a ban on Freemasonry"	65.94%	31.32%	1 : 21	No
September 8, 1935	I	Popular initiative "Leading to a total revision of the Federal Constitution"	60.90%	27.71%	3 : 19	No
June 2, 1935	I	Popular initiative "to combat the economic crisis"	84.34%	42.84%	5 : 17	No
May 5, 1935	F	Federal Act on the regulation of the transport of goods and animals by motor vehicles on public roads (Transport Division Act)	63.16%	32.35%		No
February 24, 1935	F	Federal Act amending the Federal Act on military organization of April 12, 1907 (reorganization of training)	79.91%	54.18%		Yes
March 11, 1934	F	Federal Act on the protection of public order	78.98%	46.19%		No
May 28, 1933	F	Federal Act on the temporary reduction of salaries, wages, and allowances of persons in federal service	80.51%	44.89%		No
December 6, 1931	F	Federal Act on Old-Age and Survivors’ Insurance	78.15%	39.70%		No
December 6, 1931	F	Federal Act on the taxation of tobacco	78.15%	49.89%		No
March 15, 1931	O	Federal resolution on the revision of Article 72 of the Federal Constitution (election of the National Council)	53.47%	53.88%	13½ : 8½	Yes
March 15, 1931	O	Federal resolution on the revision of Articles 76, 96, paragraph 1, and 105, paragraph 2, of the Federal Constitution (term of office of the National Council, Federal Council, and Federal Chancellor)	53.47%	53.70%	16 : 6	Yes
February 8, 1931	G	Federal resolution on the popular demand for revision of Article 12 of the Federal Constitution (ban on religious orders) (counter-proposal)	41.83%	70.19%	17 : 5	Yes
April 6, 1930	O	Federal resolution on the revision of Articles 31 and 32bis of the Federal Constitution (alcohol regime)	75.70%	60.59%	17 : 5	Yes

=== 1920–1929 ===
Date	Proposal title		Participation	Yes vote share	Cantons Yes : No	Result
May 12, 1929	I	Popular initiative "on legislation regarding road traffic"	65.08%	37.15%	3 : 19	No
May 12, 1929	I	Popular demand for the right of cantons and municipalities to ban distilled spirits intended for consumption	66.41%	32.65%	½ : 21½	No
March 3, 1929	I	Federal resolution on the popular initiative "Grain Supply"	67.26%	2.68%	0 : 22	No
March 3, 1929	G	Counter-proposal to the popular initiative "Grain Supply"	67.26%	66.79%	21 : 1	Yes
March 3, 1929	F	Federal Act amending Article 14 of the Federal Act of October 10, 1902, on the Swiss Customs Tariff	67.26%	66.42%		Yes
December 2, 1928	I	Popular initiative "Kursaal Games (Gambling Houses)"	55.52%	51.92%	14½ : 7½	Yes
May 20, 1928	O	Federal resolution on revising Article 44 of the Federal Constitution (Measures against overpopulation)	45.25%	70.68%	19½ : 2½	Yes
May 15, 1927	O	Federal resolution on amending Article 30 of the Federal Constitution (International Alpine Roads)	55.31%	62.64%	21 : 1	Yes
May 15, 1927	F	Federal Act on Automobile and Bicycle Traffic	57.84%	40.14%		No
December 5, 1926	O	Federal resolution on adopting a new Article 23bis in the Federal Constitution on the country's grain supply	72.70%	49.62%	9 : 13	No
December 6, 1925	O	Federal resolution on Old-Age, Survivors’, and Disability Insurance	63.08%	65.39%	16½ : 5½	Yes
October 25, 1925	O	Federal resolution on the residence and settlement of foreigners	67.94%	62.21%	18½ : 3½	Yes
May 24, 1925	I	Popular initiative "for Disability, Old-Age, and Survivors’ Insurance" (AHV)	68.23%	42.00%	6 : 16	No
February 17, 1924	F	Federal Act amending Article 41 of the Factory Act of June 18, 1914 / June 27, 1919	76.98%	42.37%		No
June 3, 1923	O	Federal resolution on revising Articles 31 and 32bis (Alcohol Regime) of the Federal Constitution	64.58%	42.20%	9½ : 10½	No
April 15, 1923	I	Popular initiative "to safeguard popular rights in customs matters"	65.76%	26.80%	½ : 19½	No
February 18, 1923	I	Popular initiative "Protective Custody"	53.24%	11.00%	0 : 19½	No
February 18, 1923	F	Federal resolution on the ratification of the agreement signed in Paris on August 7, 1921, between Switzerland and France to regulate trade relations and friendly cross-border traffic between the former free zones of Haute-Savoie and the Gex region and the adjacent Swiss cantons	53.43%	18.50%		No
December 3, 1922	I	Popular initiative "for a one-time wealth tax"	86.29%	12.96%	0 : 22	No
September 24, 1922	F	Federal Act amending the Federal Criminal Law of February 4, 1853, regarding crimes against the constitutional order and internal security and introducing conditional sentencing	70.30%	44.63%		No
June 11, 1922	I	Popular initiative "on acquiring Swiss citizenship, Part I"	45.59%	15.91%	0 : 22	No
June 11, 1922	I	Popular initiative "on the expulsion of foreigners, Part II"	45.59%	38.08%	0 : 22	No
June 11, 1922	I	Popular initiative "on the eligibility of federal officials to the National Council"	45.59%	38.35%	5 : 17	No
May 22, 1921	O	Federal resolution on adopting Article 37bis in the Federal Constitution (Automobile and Bicycle Traffic)	38.56%	59.77%	15½ : 6½	Yes
May 22, 1921	O	Federal resolution on adopting Article 37ter in the Federal Constitution (Airship Navigation)	38.38%	62.19%	20½ : 1½	Yes
January 30, 1921	I	Popular initiative "for subjecting open-ended or state treaties concluded for more than 15 years to a referendum (State Treaty Referendum)"	63.11%	71.35%	20 : 2	Yes
January 30, 1921	I	Popular initiative "for the abolition of military justice"	63.11%	33.57%	3 : 19	No
October 31, 1920	F	Federal Act on working hours in the operation of railways and other transport facilities	68.09%	57.12%		Yes
May 16, 1920	O	Federal resolution on Switzerland’s accession to the League of Nations	77.47%	56.29%	11½ : 10½	Yes
March 21, 1920	F	Federal Act on the regulation of employment relationships	60.29%	49.81%		No
March 21, 1920	I	Federal resolution on the popular initiative "for a ban on the establishment of gambling houses"	60.23%	55.30%	14 : 8	Yes
March 21, 1920	G	Counter-proposal "for a ban on the establishment of gambling houses"	60.23%	26.14%	½ : 21½	No

Annual Overviews: 1910 | 1912 | 1913 | 1914 | 1915 | 1917 | 1918 | 1919

Date	Proposal title		Participation	Yes vote share	Cantons Yes : No	Result
August 10, 1919	O	Federal resolution on transitional provisions to Article 73 of the Federal Constitution	32.83%	71.59%	21½ : ½	Yes
May 4, 1919	O	Federal resolution adding Article 24ter to the Federal Constitution (shipping)	53.88%	83.61%	22 : 0	Yes
May 4, 1919	O	Federal resolution on adding a constitutional article on the extraordinary war tax	53.75%	65.07%	20 : 2	Yes
October 13, 1918	I	Federal popular initiative “For proportional representation in National Council elections”	49.47%	66.78%	19½ : 2½	Yes
June 2, 1918	I	Federal popular initiative “For the introduction of direct federal taxation”	65.40%	45.93%	7½ : 14½	No
May 13, 1917	O	Federal resolution on adding Article 41bis and Article 42, paragraph 2g, to the Federal Constitution (stamp duties)	42.06%	53.16%	14½ : 7½	Yes
June 6, 1915	O	Federal resolution on adding a constitutional article to impose a one-time war tax	56.02%	94.27%	22 : 0	Yes
October 25, 1914	O	Federal resolution revising Article 103 and adding Article 114bis to the Federal Constitution	44.06%	62.35%	18 : 4	Yes
May 4, 1913	O	Federal resolution revising Articles 69 and 31, paragraph 2, letter d, of the Federal Constitution (combating human and animal diseases)	36.04%	60.32%	16½ : 5½	Yes
February 4, 1912	F	Federal law on health and accident insurance	64.26%	54.36%	%	Yes
October 23, 1910	I	Federal popular initiative “For proportional representation in National Council elections”	62.34%	47.54%	12 : 10	No

=== 1900–1909 ===
Annual Overviews: 1900 | 1902 | 1903 | 1905 | 1906 | 1907 | 1908

Date	Proposal title		Participation	Yes vote share	Cantons Yes : No	Result
October 25, 1908	G	Federal resolution on adding Article 24bis to the Federal Constitution concerning federal legislation on the utilization of water and the transmission and distribution of electrical energy (counter-proposal)	48.27%	84.43%	21½ : ½	Yes
July 5, 1908	O	Federal resolution on supplementing the Federal Constitution regarding the right to regulate trade and industry	48.70%	71.52%	67%	Yes
July 5, 1908	I	Federal popular initiative “for a ban on absinthe”	49.31%	63.48%	20 : 2	Yes

=== 1890–1899 ===
Annual overviews: 1890 | 1891 | 1893 | 1894 | 1895 | 1896 | 1897 | 1898

Date	Proposal title		Participation	Yes vote share	Cantons Yes : No	Result
November 13, 1898	O	Federal resolution on revising Article 64 of the Federal Constitution	52.75%	72.25%	16½ : 5½	Yes
November 13, 1898	O	Federal resolution on adopting Article 64bis in the Federal Constitution	52.79%	72.37%	16½ : 5½	Yes
February 20, 1898	F	Federal Act on the acquisition and operation of railways for the account of the Confederation and the organization of the administration of Swiss Federal Railways	78.06%	67.91%		Yes
July 11, 1897	O	Federal resolution on revising Article 24 of the Federal Constitution	38.66%	63.54%	16 : 6	Yes
July 11, 1897	O	Federal resolution on federal legislation regarding the trade of food and consumables, and items of use and consumption that may endanger life or health	38.75%	65.11%	18½ : 3½	Yes
February 28, 1897	F	Federal Act on the establishment of the Swiss Federal Bank	64.59%	43.33%		No
October 4, 1896	F	Federal Act on guarantees in the livestock trade	57.59%	45.54%		No
October 4, 1896	F	Federal Act on railway accounting	57.84%	55.83%		Yes
October 4, 1896	F	Federal Act on the disciplinary penal code for the Swiss Army	57.58%	19.88%		No
November 3, 1895	O	Federal resolution on revising the military articles of the Federal Constitution	67.87%	41.98%	4½ : 17½	No
September 29, 1895	O	Federal resolution on supplementing the Federal Constitution with additional provisions regarding the introduction of a matchstick monopoly	48.65%	43.23%	7½ : 14½	No
February 3, 1895	F	Federal Act on Switzerland’s representation abroad	46.33%	41.16%		No
November 4, 1894	I	Popular initiative "on allocating a portion of customs revenues to the cantons"	71.88%	29.32%	8½ : 13½	No
June 3, 1894	I	Popular initiative "to guarantee the right to work"	57.59%	19.75%	0 : 22	No
March 4, 1894	O	Federal resolution of December 20, 1893, on supplementing the Federal Constitution with an addition regarding the right to legislate on trade and commerce	46.79%	46.13%	7½ : 14½	No
August 20, 1893	I	Popular initiative "for a ban on slaughter without prior stunning"	49.18%	60.11%	11½ : 10½	Yes
May 10, 1892	Introduction of the initiative right for partial revision of the Federal Constitution					
December 6, 1891	F	Federal resolution on the purchase of the Swiss Central Railway	64.26%	31.12%		No
October 18, 1891	O	Federal resolution on revising Article 39 of the Federal Constitution	61.90%	59.35%	14 : 8	Yes
October 18, 1891	F	Federal Act on the Swiss Customs Tariff	61.90%	58.06%		Yes
July 5, 1891	O	Federal resolution on revising the Federal Constitution	49.91%	60.28%	18 : 4	Yes
March 15, 1891	F	Federal Act on federal officials and employees who become incapacitated	68.61%	20.60%		No
October 26, 1890	O	Federal resolution on supplementing the Federal Constitution of May 29, 1874, with an addition regarding legislative rights for accident and health insurance	59.75%	75.44%	20½ : 1½	Yes

=== 1880–1889 ===
Annual Overviews: 1880 | 1882 | 1884 | 1885 | 1887 | 1889

Date	Proposal title		Participation	Yes vote share	Cantons Yes : No	Result
November 17, 1889	F	Federal law on debt enforcement and bankruptcy	70.87%	52.86%	%	Yes
July 10, 1887	O	Federal resolution supplementing Article 64 of the Federal Constitution of May 29, 1874	42.40%	77.86%	20½ : 1½	Yes
May 15, 1887	F	Federal law on distilled spirits	62.45%	65.86%	%	Yes
October 25, 1885	O	Federal resolution on partially amending the Federal Constitution of the Swiss Confederation (economic matters and alcohol issues)	60.42%	59.39%	15 : 7	Yes
May 11, 1884	F	Federal law on the organization of the federal justice and police department	60.09%	41.06%	%	No
May 11, 1884	F	Federal resolution on patent fees for commercial travelers	60.09%	47.89%	%	No
May 11, 1884	F	Federal law supplementing the federal criminal code of February 4, 1853	60.09%	43.96%	%	No
May 11, 1884	F	Federal resolution granting a contribution of 10,000 francs to the chancery expenses of the Swiss embassy in Washington	60.09%	38.55%	%	No
November 26, 1882	F	Federal resolution on the implementation of Article 27 of the Federal Constitution (education system)	unclear	35.09%	%	No
July 30, 1882	O	Federal resolution on invention protection	unclear	47.48%	7½ : 14½	No
July 30, 1882	F	Federal law on measures against epidemic diseases	unclear	21.10%	%	No
October 31, 1880	O	Federal resolution on the request made by the popular petition of August 3, 1880, for revising the Federal Constitution	unclear	31.77%	4½ : 17½	No

=== 1848–1879 ===
Annual overviews: 1848 | 1866 | 1872 | 1874 | 1875 | 1876 | 1877 | 1879

Date	Proposal title		Participation	Yes vote share	Cantons Yes : No	Result
May 18, 1879	O	Federal resolution amending Article 65 of the Federal Constitution (Death penalty)	unclear	52.47%	15 : 7	Yes
January 19, 1879	F	Federal law on granting subsidies for Alpine railways	unclear	70.69%	%	Yes
October 21, 1877	F	Federal law on factory labor	unclear	51.47%	%	Yes
October 21, 1877	F	Federal law on military service obligations	unclear	48.41%	%	No
October 21, 1877	F	Federal law on the political rights of residents and temporary stayers and the loss of political rights of Swiss citizens	unclear	38.16%	%	No
July 9, 1876	F	Federal law on the military service obligation tax	unclear	45.79%	%	No
April 23, 1876	F	Federal law on the issuance and redemption of banknotes	unclear	38.32%	%	No
May 23, 1875	F	Federal law on the establishment and certification of civil status and marriage	unclear	50.97%	%	Yes
May 23, 1875	F	Federal law on political eligibility for Swiss citizens	unclear	49.43%	%	No
Introduction of the optional referendum
April 19, 1874	O	Total revision of the Federal Constitution	unclear	63.21%	13½ : 8½	Yes
May 12, 1872	O	Total revision of the Federal Constitution	unclear	49.49%	9 : 13	No
January 14, 1866	O	Standardization of measurements and weights	unclear	50.44%	9½ : 12½	No
January 14, 1866	O	Equal treatment of Jews and naturalized citizens regarding settlement	unclear	53.23%	12½%	Yes
January 14, 1866	O	Voting rights for residents in municipal matters	unclear	43.08%	8 : 14	No
January 14, 1866	O	Taxation and civil legal status of residents	unclear	39.68%	9 : 13	No
January 14, 1866	O	Voting rights for residents in cantonal affairs	unclear	48.09%	11 : 11	No
January 14, 1866	O	Freedom of belief and worship	unclear	49.16%	11 : 11	No
January 14, 1866	O	Prohibition of certain types of punishment	unclear	34.19%	6½ : 15½	No
January 14, 1866	O	Protection of intellectual property	unclear	43.66%	10½ : 11½	No
January 14, 1866	O	Prohibition of lotteries and gambling	unclear	44.03%	9½ : 12½%	No
July/August 1848	(O)	Total revision of September 12, 1848	unclear	72.83%	15½ : 6½%	Yes

The Federal Constitution of 1848 "was not subjected to a nationwide federal referendum. However, most cantons conducted such a vote on their own initiative, as some had already done in 1833 for an unsuccessful revision of the Federal Treaty". At the time of the referendum on the Federal Constitution of 1848, the Federal Charter of 1815 was still in force, which did not provide a legal basis for conducting such a referendum; thus, this referendum does not meet the definition of a true mandatory referendum.

The first nationwide referendum was held by order of the Small Council of the Federal Council) of the Helvetic Republic on May 25, 1802, concerning the Second Helvetic Constitution.

== Statistics ==
From 1848 to the referendum on June 18, 2023, the following statistics apply:

Trigger	Number
Initiatives (including initiatives with counter-proposals)	229
Mandatory referendums (including counter-proposals to popular initiatives)	242
Optional referendums	202
Total	664*

*Popular initiatives with counter-proposals are counted as a single issue.

Result	Number
Accepted proposals	323
Rejected proposals	357
Total	664

== See also ==
- Federal popular initiative
- Voting in Switzerland
- Popular Initiative "For the Criminal Foreigners' Deportation"
