= 2007 Swiss referendums =

Two referendums were held in Switzerland in 2007. The first was held on 11 March on an amendment to articles 117 and 197 of the Swiss Federal Constitution regarding health insurance, which would have merged existing health insurance companies into a single public insurer, with premiums based on income. The proposal was rejected by 71% of voters.

The second was held on 17 June on an amendment to the disability law, and was approved by 59% of voters.

== Results ==
Month	Question	For		Against		Blank/invalid		Total	Registered voters	Turnout	Cantons for		Cantons against	
Month	Question	Votes	%	Votes	%	Blank	Invalid	Total	Registered voters	Turnout	Full	Half	Full	Half
March	Constitutional amendment	641,917	28.76	1,590,213	71.24	16,993	8,780	2,257,903	4,914,140	45.95	2	0	18	6
June	Disability law amendment	1,039,282	59.09	719,628	40.91	19,618	5,970	1,784,498	4,929,272	36.20				
Source: Nohlen
