= 1982 Swiss referendums =

Three referendums were held in Switzerland in 1982. The first two were held on 6 June: one was on an amendment to the Swiss penal code, which was approved, and the other was on a new law on foreigners, which was narrowly rejected. The third referendum was held on 28 November and addressed a popular initiative "for the prevention of abusive prices", alongside a counter-proposal. The initiative was approved and the counter-proposal was rejected.

== Results ==
=== June: Penal code ===
Choice	Votes	%
For	880,880	63.7
Against	501,791	36.3
Blank votes	22,595	–
Invalid votes	1,762	–
Total	1,407,028	100
Registered voters/turnout	3,999,674	35.2
Source: Nohlen & Stöver

=== June: Foreigner law ===
Choice	Votes	%
For	680,404	49.6
Against	690,268	50.4
Blank votes	34,425	–
Invalid votes	1,869	–
Total	1,406,966	100
Registered voters/turnout	3,999,674	35.2
Source: Nohlen & Stöver

=== November: Prices ===
Choice	Popular initiative					Counterproposal				
Choice	Popular vote		Cantons			Popular vote		Cantons		
Choice	Votes	%	Full	Half	Total	Votes	%	Full	Half	Total
For	730,938	56.1	16	2	17	281,132	21.6	0	0	0
Against	530,498	40.7	4	4	6	850,880	65.3	20	6	23
No answer	40,751	3.1	–	–	–	170,175	13.1	–	–	–
Blank votes	12,586	–	–	–	–	12,586	–	–	–	–
Invalid votes	9,698	–	–	–	–	9,698	–	–	–	–
Total	1,324,471	100	20	6	23	1,324,471	100	20	6	23
Registered voters/turnout	4,023,726	32.9	–	–	–	4,023,726	32.9	–	–	–
Source: Direct Democracy
