= 1968 Swiss referendums =

Two referendums were held in Switzerland in 1968. The first was held on 18 February on a general tax amnesty, and was approved by 62% of voters. The second was held on 19 May on a tobacco tax, and was rejected by 52% of voters.

== Results ==
=== February: General tax amnesty ===
Choice	Popular vote		Cantons		
Choice	Votes	%	Full	Half	Total
For	400,900	61.9	19	6	22
Against	247,255	38.1	0	0	0
Blank votes	20,158	–	–	–	–
Invalid votes	2,089	–	–	–	–
Total	670,402	100	19	6	22
Registered voters/turnout	1,603,763	41.8	–	–	–
Source: Nohlen & Stöver

=== May: Tobacco tax ===
Choice	Votes	%
For	277,229	48.2
Against	297,381	51.8
Blank votes	17,815	–
Invalid votes	833	–
Total	593,258	100
Registered voters/turnout	1,606,731	36.9
Source: Nohlen & Stöver
