= 1882 Swiss referendums =

Three referendums were held in Switzerland in 1882. Two were held on 30 July on copyright law and measures against epidemics, both of which were rejected. The third was held on 26 November on executing article 27 of the federal constitution, and was rejected by 64.9% of voters.

== Background ==
The referendums on epidemics and the constitution were optional referendums, which meant that only a majority of the public vote was required for the proposals to be approved. The referendum on copyright law was a mandatory referendum, which required both a majority of voters and cantons to approve the proposals.

== Results ==
=== Copyright law ===
Choice	Popular vote		Cantons		
Choice	Votes	%	Full	Half	Total
For	141,616	47.5	7	1	7.5
Against	156,658	52.5	12	5	13.5
Invalid/blank votes		–	–	–	–
Total	298,274	100	19	6	22
Registered voters/turnout	635,249		–	–	–
Source: Nohlen & Stöver

=== Measures against epidemics ===
Choice	Votes	%
For	68,027	21.1
Against	254,340	78.9
Invalid/blank votes		–
Total	322,367	100
Registered voters/turnout	635,249	
Source: Nohlen & Stöver

=== Execution of article 27 of the federal constitution ===
Choice	Votes	%
For	172,010	35.1
Against	318,139	64.9
Blank votes		–
Invalid votes	4,829	–
Total		100
Registered voters/turnout	648,000	
Source: Nohlen & Stöver
