= 1965 Swiss referendums =

Three referendums were held in Switzerland during 1965. The first two were held on 28 February on measures against prices rises in the banking and housebuilding sectors, with both approved by voters. The third was held on 16 May on a federal law on dairy products and edible fats, and was also approved by voters.

== Results ==
=== February: Measures against prices rises in the banking sector ===
Choice	Popular vote		Cantons		
Choice	Votes	%	Full	Half	Total
For	526,599	57.7	16	5	18.5
Against	385,745	42.3	3	1	3.5
Blank votes	15,348	–	–	–	–
Invalid votes	2,004	–	–	–	–
Total	929,696	100	19	6	22
Registered voters/turnout	1,558,090	59.7	–	–	–
Source: Nohlen & Stöver

=== February: Measures against prices rises in the housebuilding sector ===
Choice	Popular vote		Cantons		
Choice	Votes	%	Full	Half	Total
For	507,739	55.5	16	2	17
Against	406,447	44.5	3	4	5
Blank votes	13,992	–	–	–	–
Invalid votes	2,075	–	–	–	–
Total	930,253	100	19	6	22
Registered voters/turnout	1,558,090	59.7	–	–	–
Source: Nohlen & Stöver

=== May: Federal law on dairy and edible fat products ===
Choice	Votes	%
For	347,059	62.0
Against	212,784	38.0
Blank votes	22,628	–
Invalid votes	690	–
Total	583,161	100
Registered voters/turnout	1,556,375	37.5
Source: Nohlen & Stöver
