= 1945 Swiss referendums =

Two referendums were held in Switzerland during 1945. The first was held on 21 January on a federal law on the Swiss Federal Railways, and was approved by voters. The second was held on 25 November on a federal resolution on the "for the family" petition, and was also approved.

== Background ==
The January referendum on the Swiss Federal Railways was an optional referendum, which required only a simple majority to pass. The November referendum was a mandatory referendum, which required a double majority; a majority of the popular vote and majority of the cantons. The decision of each canton was based on the vote in that canton. Full cantons counted as one vote, whilst half cantons counted as half.

== Results ==
=== January referendum ===
Choice	Votes	%
For	388,831	56.7
Against	296,809	43.3
Blank votes	15,300	–
Invalid votes	1,461	–
Total	702,401	100
Registered voters/turnout	1,327,961	52.9
Source: Nohlen & Stöver

=== November referendum ===
Choice	Popular vote		Cantons		
Choice	Votes	%	Full	Half	Total
For	548,601	76.3	19	5	21.5
Against	170,278	23.7	0	1	0.5
Blank votes	24,738	–	–	–	–
Invalid votes	1,610	–	–	–	–
Total	745,227	100	19	6	22
Registered voters/turnout	1,341,980	55.5	–	–	–
Source: Nohlen & Stöver
