= 1953 Swiss referendums =

Three referendums were held in Switzerland during 1953. The first was held on 19 April on revising the federal law on postal delivery, and was rejected by 64% of voters. The second and third were held on 6 December on reordering the federal budget and adding a new article 24quater to the federal constitution on water pollution controls. The budget proposal was rejected by 58% of voters, whilst the constitutional amendment was approved by 81% of voters.

== Results ==
=== April: Federal law on postal delivery ===
Choice	Votes	%
For	267,659	36.5
Against	466,431	63.5
Blank votes	15,489	–
Invalid votes	1,589	–
Total	751,168	100
Registered voters/turnout	1,426,714	52.7
Source: Nohlen & Stöver

=== December: Federal budget ===
Choice	Popular vote		Cantons		
Choice	Votes	%	Full	Half	Total
For	354,149	42.0	3	0	3
Against	488,232	58.0	16	6	19
Blank votes	20,084	–	–	–	–
Invalid votes	1,617	–	–	–	–
Total	864,082	100	19	6	22
Registered voters/turnout	1,433,363	60.3	–	–	–
Source: Nohlen & Stöver

=== December: Constitutional amendment ===
Choice	Popular vote		Cantons		
Choice	Votes	%	Full	Half	Total
For	671,565	81.3	19	6	22
Against	154,234	18.7	0	0	0
Blank votes	20,938	–	–	–	–
Invalid votes	1,071	–	–	–	–
Total	847,808	100	19	6	22
Registered voters/turnout	1,433,363	59.1	–	–	–
Source: Nohlen & Stöver
