= 2004 Swiss referendums =

Thirteen referendums were held in Switzerland during 2004. The first three were held on 8 February on a counter proposal to the popular initiative "for safe and efficient motorways" (rejected), an amendment to the Obligations (tenancy) law (rejected) and a popular initiative "life-long custody for non-curable, extremely dangerous sexual and violent criminals" (approved). The second set of three was held on 16 May on a revision of the federal law on Aged and Bereaved insurance, a federal resolution on financing the Aged and Bereaved insurance, and a federal law that would affect taxation for married couples, families, private housing and stamp duty, all of which were rejected.

The next four were held on 26 September on a federal resolution on naturalisation (rejected), a federal resolution on third-generation foreigners getting Swiss citizenship (rejected), a popular initiative "postal services for all" (rejected) and a federal law on compensating members of the armed forces for loss of earnings (approved). The final set of referendums was held on 28 November on a federal resolution on rebalancing the financial duties of the Federation and the Cantons, a federal resolution on the constitutional reordering of the budget and a federal law on stem cell research, all of which were approved.

== Results ==
Month	Question	For		Against		Blank/invalid		Total	Registered voters	Turnout	Cantons for		Cantons against	
Month	Question	Votes	%	Votes	%	Blank	Invalid	Total	Registered voters	Turnout	Full	Half	Full	Half
February	Counter-proposals to motorway initiative	800,632	37.2	1,351,500	62.8	22,991	7,914	2,183,037	4,788,961	45.6	0	0	20	6
February	Amendment to the Obligations (tenancy) law	755,561	35.9	1,347,458	64.1	64,015	8,391	2,175,425	4,788,961	45.4				
February	Life sentences for dangerous criminals	1,198,867	56.2	934,569	43.8	39,124	8,303	2,180,863	4,788,961	45.5	19	5	1	1
May	Amending the Aged and Bereaved insurance law	772,773	32.1	1,634,572	67.9	20,747	10,313	2,438,405	4,798,197	50.8				
May	Financing of Aged and Bereaved insurance	756,550	31.4	1,651,347	68.6	21,035	10,369	2,439,301	4,798,197	50.8	0	0	20	6
May	Federal law on taxation	821,475	34.1	1,585,910	65.9	21,902	10,390	2,439,677	4,798,197	50.8				
September	Federal resolution on naturalisation	1,106,529	43.2	1,452,453	56.8	20,188	12,256	2,591,426	4,814,035	53.8	5	1	15	5
September	Citizenship rights of third-generation immigrants	1,238,912	48.4	1,322,587	51.6	18,214	12,255	2,591,968	4,814,035	53.8	6	1	14	5
September	Postal services for all	1,247,711	49.8	1,259,114	50.2	58,197	12,597	2,577,679	4,814,035	53.5	9	1	11	5
September	Compensation for members of the armed forces	1,417,159	55.5	1,138,580	44.5	22,600	12,385	2,590,724	4,814,035	53.8				
November	Federal and cantonal financial duties	1,104,565	64.4	611,331	35.6	52,754	8,064	1,776,714	4,819,855	36.9	18	5	2	1
November	Constitutional reordering of the federal budget	1,258,895	73.8	446,662	26.2	61,974	8,239	1,775,770	4,819,855	36.8	19	6	1	0
November	Stem cell research law	1,156,706	66.4	585,530	33.6	35,058	7,921	1,785,215	4,819,855	37.0				
Source: Nohlen & Stöver
