= 1956 Swiss referendums =

Five referendums were held in Switzerland during 1956. The first was held on 4 March on a federal resolution on a limited extension of price controls, and was approved by voters. The second and third were held on 13 May on a popular initiative "on the grant of concessions for water usage" and a federal resolution on government efforts to strengthen the economy of Graubünden, both of which were rejected by voters. The fourth and fifth were held on 30 September on a federal resolution on changing the breadstuffs law and a petition about decisions on expenditure taken by the Federal Assembly, both of which were also rejected.

== Results ==
=== March: Price controls ===
Choice	Popular vote		Cantons		
Choice	Votes	%	Full	Half	Total
For	542,425	77.5	19	6	22
Against	157,106	22.5	0	0	0
Blank votes	16,118	–	–	–	–
Invalid votes	2,899	–	–	–	–
Total	718,548	100	19	6	22
Registered voters/turnout	1,454,506	49.4	–	–	–
Source: Nohlen & Stöver

=== May: Water usage ===
Choice	Popular vote		Cantons		
Choice	Votes	%	Full	Half	Total
For	266,222	36.9	2	1	2.5
Against	454,831	63.1	17	5	19.5
Blank votes	35,070	–	–	–	–
Invalid votes	1,369	–	–	–	–
Total	757,492	100	19	6	22
Registered voters/turnout	1,454,269	52.6	–	–	–
Source: Nohlen & Stöver

=== May: Measures to strengthen the economy of Graubünden ===
Choice	Votes	%
For	316,276	42.5
Against	428,561	57.5
Blank votes	19,203	–
Invalid votes	1,503	–
Total	765,543	100
Registered voters/turnout	1,454,269	52.6
Source: Nohlen & Stöver

=== September: Breadstuffs ===
Choice	Popular vote		Cantons		
Choice	Votes	%	Full	Half	Total
For	239,890	38.7	4	3	5.5
Against	379,245	61.3	15	3	16.5
Blank votes	21,263	–	–	–	–
Invalid votes	1,206	–	–	–	–
Total	641,604	100	19	6	22
Registered voters/turnout	1,459,824	44.0	–	–	–
Source: Nohlen & Stöver

=== September: Federal Assembly expenditure ===
Choice	Popular vote		Cantons		
Choice	Votes	%	Full	Half	Total
For	276,660	45.5	8	2	9
Against	331,117	54.5	11	4	13
Blank votes	30,926	–	–	–	–
Invalid votes	1,193	–	–	–	–
Total	639,896	100	19	6	22
Registered voters/turnout	1,459,824	43.8	–	–	–
Source: Nohlen & Stöver
