= 1964 Swiss referendums =

Three referendums were held in Switzerland in 1964. The first was held on 2 February on granting a general tax amnesty, and was rejected by voters. The second was held on 24 May on a federal law on vocational education, and was approved by voters. The third was held on 6 December on continuing with price controls, and was also approved by voters.

== Results ==
=== February: Tax amnesty ===
Choice	Popular vote		Cantons		
Choice	Votes	%	Full	Half	Total
For	276,236	42.0	3	1	3.5
Against	381,864	58.0	16	5	18.5
Blank votes	20,519	–	–	–	–
Invalid votes	1,352	–	–	–	–
Total	679,971	100	19	6	22
Registered voters/turnout	1,535,746	44.3	–	–	–
Source: Nohlen & Stöver

=== May: Federal law on vocational education ===
Choice	Votes	%
For	375,052	68.6
Against	171,597	31.4
Blank votes	21,893	–
Invalid votes	1,495	–
Total	570,037	100
Registered voters/turnout	1,539,434	37.0
Source: Nohlen & Stöver

=== December: Continuing with price controls ===
Choice	Popular vote		Cantons		
Choice	Votes	%	Full	Half	Total
For	461,630	79.5	19	6	22
Against	119,258	20.5	0	0	0
Blank votes	24,244	–	–	–	–
Invalid votes	1,468	–	–	–	–
Total	606,600	100	19	6	22
Registered voters/turnout	1,547,405	39.2	–	–	–
Source: Nohlen & Stöver
