= 1894 Swiss referendums =

Three referendums were held in Switzerland during 1894. The first was held on 4 March on a federal resolution to amend the constitution regarding trade and commerce, and was rejected by a majority of voters and cantons. The second was held on 3 June on a popular initiative on the right to work, and was rejected by a majority of voters and all cantons. The third was held on 4 November 1894 on a popular initiative on a partial contribution to tariffs from the cantons, and was also rejected by a majority of voters and cantons.

== Background ==
The referendums on the right to work and tariffs were popular initiatives, whilst the referendum on trade was a mandatory referendum. Both types required a double majority; a majority of the popular vote and majority of the cantons. The decision of each canton was based on the vote in that canton. Full cantons counted as one vote, whilst half cantons counted as half.

== Results ==
=== Trade and commerce ===
| Choice | Popular vote | | Cantons | | |
| Choice | Votes | % | Full | Half | Total |
|---|---|---|---|---|---|
| For | 135,713 | 46.1 | 7 | 1 | 7.5 |
| Against | 158,492 | 53.9 | 12 | 5 | 14.5 |
| Blank votes | 21,454 | – | – | – | – |
| Invalid votes | 1,048 | – | – | – | – |
| Total | 316,707 | 100 | 19 | 6 | 22 |
| Registered voters/turnout | 676,854 | 46.8 | – | – | – |
Source: Nohlen & Stöver

=== Right to work ===
| Choice | Popular vote | | Cantons | | |
| Choice | Votes | % | Full | Half | Total |
|---|---|---|---|---|---|
| For | 75,880 | 19.8 | 0 | 0 | 0 |
| Against | 308,289 | 80.2 | 19 | 6 | 22 |
| Blank votes | 5,865 | – | – | – | – |
| Invalid votes | 1,993 | – | – | – | – |
| Total | 392,027 | 100 | 19 | 6 | 22 |
| Registered voters/turnout | 680,731 | 57.6 | – | – | – |
Source: Nohlen & Stöver

=== Tariffs ===
| Choice | Popular vote | | Cantons | | |
| Choice | Votes | % | Full | Half | Total |
|---|---|---|---|---|---|
| For | 145,462 | 29.3 | 7 | 3 | 8.5 |
| Against | 350,639 | 70.7 | 12 | 3 | 13.5 |
| Blank votes | 5,524 | – | – | – | – |
| Invalid votes | 1,239 | – | – | – | – |
| Total | 502,864 | 100 | 19 | 6 | 22 |
| Registered voters/turnout | 690,250 | 72.9 | – | – | – |
Source: Nohlen & Stöver
