= 1946 Swiss referendums =

Two referendums were held in Switzerland during 1946. The first was held on 10 February on a federal resolution on a petition on cargo transportation, and was rejected by voters. The second was held on 8 December on a popular initiative on the "right to work", and was also rejected.

== Background ==
The February referendum on cargo transportation was a mandatory referendum, whilst the December referendum was a popular initiative. Both required a double majority; a majority of the popular vote and majority of the cantons. The decision of each canton was based on the vote in that canton. Full cantons counted as one vote, whilst half cantons counted as half.

== Results ==
=== February referendum ===
Choice	Popular vote		Cantons		
Choice	Votes	%	Full	Half	Total
For	289,935	33.7	1	0	1
Against	571,566	66.3	18	6	21
Blank votes	14,857	–	–	–	–
Invalid votes	2,317	–	–	–	–
Total	878,675	100	19	6	22
Registered voters/turnout	1,347,483	65.2	–	–	–
Source: Nohlen & Stöver

=== December referendum ===
Choice	Popular vote		Cantons		
Choice	Votes	%	Full	Half	Total
For	124,792	19.2	0	0	0
Against	525,366	80.8	19	6	22
Blank votes	28,852	–	–	–	–
Invalid votes	2,479	–	–	–	–
Total	681,489	100	19	6	22
Registered voters/turnout	1,359,392	50.1	–	–	–
Source: Nohlen & Stöver
