= 1876 Swiss referendums =

Two referendums were held in Switzerland in 1876. The first was held on 23 April on the subject of distributing and cashing of banknotes, and was rejected by 61.7% of voters. The second was held on 9 July on a federal law on taxation of compensation for not serving in the military, and was rejected by 54.2% of voters.

== Background ==
Both referendums were classed as "optional referendums", which meant that only a majority of the public vote was required for them to pass, as opposed to the mandatory referendums that required both a majority of voters and cantons to approve the proposals.

== Results ==
=== Banknotes ===
Choice	Votes	%
For	120,068	38.3
Against	193,253	61.7
Invalid/blank votes		–
Total	313,321	100
Registered voters/turnout		
Source: Nohlen & Stöver

=== Military taxation ===
Choice	Votes	%
For	156,157	45.8
Against	184,894	54.2
Invalid/blank votes		–
Total	341,051	100
Registered voters/turnout		
Source: Nohlen & Stöver
