= 1960 Swiss referendums =

Two referendums were held in Switzerland in 1960. The first was held on 29 May on continuing with temporary price controls, and was approved by 77% of voters. The second was held on 4 December on economic and financial measures for the dairy farming industry, and was also approved by voters.

== Results ==
=== May: Continuing with temporary price controls ===
Choice	Popular vote		Cantons		
Choice	Votes	%	Full	Half	Total
For	432,219	77.5	19	6	22
Against	125,205	22.5	0	0	0
Blank votes	22,033	–	–	–	–
Invalid votes	1,015	–	–	–	–
Total	580,472	100	19	6	22
Registered voters/turnout	1,488,779	39.0	–	–	–
Source: Nohlen & Stöver

=== December: Dairy farming measures ===
Choice	Votes	%
For	404,104	56.3
Against	310,020	43.7
Blank votes	31,199	–
Invalid votes	2,471	–
Total	743,794	100
Registered voters/turnout	1,493,734	49.8
Source: Nohlen & Stöver
