= 1969 Swiss referendums =

Two referendums were held in Switzerland in 1969. The first was held on 1 June on a federal law on the Swiss Federal Institutes of Technology, and was rejected by 66% of voters. The second was held on 14 September 1969 on an amendment to the constitution regarding land law, and was approved by 56% of voters.

== Results ==
=== June: Swiss Federal Institutes of Technology ===
Choice	Votes	%
For	179,765	34.5
Against	341,548	65.5
Blank votes	28,246	–
Invalid votes	1,033	–
Total	550,592	100
Registered voters/turnout	1,623,226	33.9
Source: Nohlen & Stöver

=== September: Constitutional amendment on land law ===
Choice	Popular vote		Cantons		
Choice	Votes	%	Full	Half	Total
For	286,282	55.9	17	5	19.5
Against	225,536	44.1	2	1	2.5
Blank votes	22,977	–	–	–	–
Invalid votes	1,035	–	–	–	–
Total	535,830	100	19	6	22
Registered voters/turnout	1,626,593	32.9	–	–	–
Source: Nohlen & Stöver
