= 1896 Swiss referendum =

Popular vote in Switzerland

A three-part referendum was held in Switzerland on 4 October 1896. Voters were asked whether they approved of each of the following proposals: a federal law on guarantees in the cattle trade, a federal law on the accounting system for the railways and a federal law on the disciplinary penal code for the federal army. Whilst the law on the railways was approved, the other two were rejected by voters.

== Background ==
The referendums were optional referendums, which required only a majority of the public vote, rather than a majority of votes and cantons.

== Results ==
=== Cattle trade guarantees law ===
Choice	Votes	%
For	174,880	45.5
Against	209,118	54.5
Blank votes	20,483	–
Invalid votes	6,827	–
Total	411,308	100
Registered voters/turnout	714,033	57.6
Source: Nohlen & Stöver

=== Railways accounting law ===
Choice	Votes	%
For	223,228	55.8
Against	176,577	44.2
Blank votes	10,095	–
Invalid votes	3,089	–
Total	412,989	100
Registered voters/turnout	714,033	57.8
Source: Nohlen & Stöver

=== Military penal code law ===
Choice	Votes	%
For	77,169	19.9
Against	310,992	80.1
Blank votes	15,717	–
Invalid votes	7,295	–
Total	411,173	100
Registered voters/turnout	714,033	57.6
Source: Nohlen & Stöver
