= 1954 Swiss referendums =

Four referendums were held in Switzerland during 1954. The first two were held on 20 June on a federal resolution on concessions for shoemakers, saddlers, barbers and wainwrights and a federal resolution on assistance for war-affected Swiss citizens living abroad. Both were rejected by voters. The third was held on 24 October on a federal resolution on financial order between 1955 and 1958, and was approved by 70% of voters. The fourth was held on 5 December on a popular initiative for the "protection of the Stromlandschaft and concession Rheinau", and was rejected by 69% of voters.

== Results ==
=== June: Concessions for some industries ===
Choice	Votes	%
For	187,729	33.1
Against	380,213	66.9
Blank votes	19,483	–
Invalid votes	1,407	–
Total	588,832	100
Registered voters/turnout	1,437,972	40.9
Source: Nohlen & Stöver

=== June: Assistance for the war-affected ===
Choice	Votes	%
For	243,311	44.0
Against	309,083	56.0
Blank votes	31,196	–
Invalid votes	1,048	–
Total	584,638	100
Registered voters/turnout	1,437,972	40.7
Source: Nohlen & Stöver

=== October: Financial order ===
Choice	Popular vote		Cantons		
Choice	Votes	%	Full	Half	Total
For	457,527	70.0	18	6	21
Against	196,188	30.0	1	0	1
Blank votes	19,331	–	–	–	–
Invalid votes	1,096	–	–	–	–
Total	674,142	100	19	6	22
Registered voters/turnout	1,441,310	46.8	–	–	–
Source: Nohlen & Stöver

=== December: Popular initiative ===
Choice	Popular vote		Cantons		
Choice	Votes	%	Full	Half	Total
For	229,114	31.2	1	0	1
Against	504,330	68.8	18	6	21
Blank votes	13,995	–	–	–	–
Invalid votes	1,000	–	–	–	–
Total	748,439	100	19	6	22
Registered voters/turnout	1,442,668	51.9	–	–	–
Source: Nohlen & Stöver
