= 1919 Swiss referendums =

Three referendums were held in Switzerland during 1919. The first two were held on 4 May on amending the constitution to add article 24ter on shipping, and on a constitutional amendment to impose a war tax. Both proposals were approved by a majority of voters and cantons. The third was held on 10 August on temporary amendments to article 73 of the constitution, and was also approved in spite of low turnout.

== Background ==
All three referendums were mandatory referendums, which required a double majority; a majority of the popular vote and majority of the cantons. The decision of each canton was based on the vote in that canton. Full cantons counted as one vote, whilst half cantons counted as half.

== Results ==
=== Constitutional amendment on shipping ===
| Choice | Popular vote | | Cantons | | |
| Choice | Votes | % | Full | Half | Total |
|---|---|---|---|---|---|
| For | 399,131 | 83.6 | 19 | 6 | 22 |
| Against | 78,260 | 16.4 | 0 | 0 | 0 |
| Blank votes | 19,329 | – | – | – | – |
| Invalid votes | 8,401 | – | – | – | – |
| Total | 505,121 | 100 | 19 | 6 | 22 |
| Registered voters/turnout | 937,257 | 53.9 | – | – | – |
Source: Nohlen & Stöver

=== Constitutional amendment on a war tax ===
| Choice | Popular vote | | Cantons | | |
| Choice | Votes | % | Full | Half | Total |
|---|---|---|---|---|---|
| For | 307,528 | 65.1 | 17 | 6 | 20 |
| Against | 165,119 | 34.9 | 2 | 0 | 2 |
| Blank votes | 20,920 | – | – | – | – |
| Invalid votes | 10,347 | – | – | – | – |
| Total | 503,914 | 100 | 19 | 6 | 22 |
| Registered voters/turnout | 937,257 | 53.8 | – | – | – |
Source: Nohlen & Stöver

=== Temporary amendment of article 73 ===
| Choice | Popular vote | | Cantons | | |
| Choice | Votes | % | Full | Half | Total |
|---|---|---|---|---|---|
| For | 200,008 | 71.6 | 19 | 5 | 21.5 |
| Against | 79,369 | 28.4 | 0 | 1 | 0.5 |
| Blank votes | 19,708 | – | – | – | – |
| Invalid votes | 6,710 | – | – | – | – |
| Total | 305,795 | 100 | 19 | 6 | 22 |
| Registered voters/turnout | 931,523 | 32.8 | – | – | – |
Source: Nohlen & Stöver
