= 1895 Swiss referendums =

Three referendums were held in Switzerland during 1895. The first was held on 3 February on a popular initiative on a federal law on Swiss embassies abroad, and was rejected by a majority of voters. The second was held on 29 September on a federal resolution on amending the constitution regarding the institution of a match monopoly, and was rejected by a majority of voters and cantons. The third was held on 3 November on a constitutional amendment regarding the military, and was also rejected by a majority of voters and cantons.

== Background ==
The referendums on a match monopoly and the military were mandatory referendums, which required a double majority; a majority of the popular vote and majority of the cantons. The decision of each canton was based on the vote in that canton. Full cantons counted as one vote, whilst half cantons counted as half. The embassies referendum was an optional referendum, which required only a majority of the public vote.

== Results ==
=== Embassies ===
Choice	Votes	%
For	124,517	41.2
Against	177,991	58.8
Blank votes	11,992	–
Invalid votes	4,781	–
Total	319,281	100
Registered voters/turnout	689,180	46.3
Source: Nohlen & Stöver

=== Match monopoly ===
Choice	Popular vote		Cantons		
Choice	Votes	%	Full	Half	Total
For	140,174	43.2	6	3	7.5
Against	184,109	56.8	13	3	14.5
Blank votes	9,442	–	–	–	–
Invalid votes	2,236	–	–	–	–
Total	335,961	100	19	6	22
Registered voters/turnout	690,592	48.6	–	–	–
Source: Nohlen & Stöver

=== Constitutional amendment on the military ===
Choice	Popular vote		Cantons		
Choice	Votes	%	Full	Half	Total
For	195,178	42.0	4	1	4.5
Against	269,751	58.0	15	5	17.5
Blank votes	7,066	–	–	–	–
Invalid votes	1,277	–	–	–	–
Total	473,272	100	19	6	22
Registered voters/turnout	697,131	67.9	–	–	–
Source: Nohlen & Stöver
