= 1991 Swiss referendums =

Four referendums were held in Switzerland in 1991. The first two were held on 3 March on lowering the voting age to 18, which was approved, and on a popular initiative on promoting public transport, which was rejected. The third and fourth were held on 2 June on reorganising the federal finances, which was rejected, and amending the military penal code, which was approved.

== Results ==
=== March: Lowering the voting age to 18 ===
| Choice | Popular vote | | Cantons | | |
| Choice | Votes | % | Full | Half | Total |
|---|---|---|---|---|---|
| For | 981,425 | 72.7 | 20 | 6 | 23 |
| Against | 367,647 | 27.3 | 0 | 0 | 0 |
| Blank votes | 9,794 | – | – | – | – |
| Invalid votes | 2,347 | – | – | – | – |
| Total | 1,361,213 | 100 | 20 | 6 | 23 |
| Registered voters/turnout | 4,350,879 | 31.3 | – | – | – |
Source: Nohlen & Stöver

=== March: Promotion of public transport ===
| Choice | Popular vote | | Cantons | | |
| Choice | Votes | % | Full | Half | Total |
|---|---|---|---|---|---|
| For | 496,600 | 37.1 | 1 | 1 | 1.5 |
| Against | 840,494 | 62.9 | 19 | 5 | 21.5 |
| Blank votes | 19,406 | – | – | – | – |
| Invalid votes | 2,514 | – | – | – | – |
| Total | 1,359,014 | 100 | 20 | 6 | 23 |
| Registered voters/turnout | 4,350,879 | 31.2 | – | – | – |
Source: Nohlen & Stöver

=== June: Federal finances ===
| Choice | Popular vote | | Cantons | | |
| Choice | Votes | % | Full | Half | Total |
|---|---|---|---|---|---|
| For | 664,318 | 45.6 | 2 | 1 | 2.5 |
| Against | 790,988 | 54.4 | 18 | 5 | 20.5 |
| Blank votes | 39,055 | – | – | – | – |
| Invalid votes | 2,480 | – | – | – | – |
| Total | 1,496,841 | 100 | 20 | 6 | 23 |
| Registered voters/turnout | 4,499,041 | 33.3 | – | – | – |
Source: Nohlen & Stöver

=== June: Amendment to the military penal code ===
| Choice | Votes | % |
|---|---|---|
| For | 817,458 | 55.7 |
| Against | 650,658 | 44.3 |
| Blank votes | 28,614 | – |
| Invalid votes | 2,466 | – |
| Total | 1,499,196 | 100 |
| Registered voters/turnout | 4,499,041 | 33.3 |
Source: Nohlen & Stöver
