= 1983 Swiss referendums =

Four referendums were held in Switzerland in 1983. The first two were held on changes to fuel tax and the article in the Swiss Federal Constitution on energy. Whilst they were both approved by voters, the constitutional amendment failed to receive the support of a majority of cantons, so was rejected. The last two were held on 3 December on changes to the civil rights regulations, which were approved, and on allowing certain types of naturalisation, which was rejected.

== Results ==
=== February: Fuel tax ===
| Choice | Popular vote | | Cantons | | |
| Choice | Votes | % | Full | Half | Total |
|---|---|---|---|---|---|
| For | 679,134 | 52.7 | 14 | 3 | 15.5 |
| Against | 609,871 | 47.3 | 6 | 3 | 7.5 |
| Blank votes | 17,706 | – | – | – | – |
| Invalid votes | 1,162 | – | – | – | – |
| Total | 1,307,873 | 100 | 20 | 6 | 23 |
| Registered voters/turnout | 4,034,694 | 32.4 | – | – | – |
Source: Nohlen & Stöver

=== February: Constitutional amendment on energy ===
| Choice | Popular vote | | Cantons | | |
| Choice | Votes | % | Full | Half | Total |
|---|---|---|---|---|---|
| For | 649,485 | 50.9 | 11 | 0 | 11 |
| Against | 626,047 | 49.1 | 9 | 6 | 12 |
| Blank votes | 29,811 | – | – | – | – |
| Invalid votes | 1,250 | – | – | – | – |
| Total | 1,306,593 | 100 | 20 | 6 | 23 |
| Registered voters/turnout | 4,034,694 | 32.4 | – | – | – |
Source: Nohlen & Stöver

=== December: Civil rights regulations ===
| Choice | Popular vote | | Cantons | | |
| Choice | Votes | % | Full | Half | Total |
|---|---|---|---|---|---|
| For | 872,981 | 60.8 | 18 | 5 | 20.5 |
| Against | 562,557 | 39.2 | 2 | 1 | 2.5 |
| Blank votes | 22,557 | – | – | – | – |
| Invalid votes | 1,698 | – | – | – | – |
| Total | 1,459,793 | 100 | 20 | 6 | 23 |
| Registered voters/turnout | 4,073,941 | 35.8 | – | – | – |
Source: Nohlen & Stöver

=== December: Allowing certain types of naturalisation ===
| Choice | Popular vote | | Cantons | | |
| Choice | Votes | % | Full | Half | Total |
|---|---|---|---|---|---|
| For | 644,669 | 44.8 | 4 | 2 | 5 |
| Against | 793,253 | 55.2 | 16 | 4 | 18 |
| Blank votes | 21,687 | – | – | – | – |
| Invalid votes | 1,661 | – | – | – | – |
| Total | 1,461,270 | 100 | 20 | 6 | 23 |
| Registered voters/turnout | 4,073,941 | 35.9 | – | – | – |
Source: Nohlen & Stöver
