= 1995 Swiss referendums =

Seven referendums were held in Switzerland during 1995. The first four were held on 12 March on a federal resolution on the popular initiative "for an environmentally sound and efficient peasant farming" (rejected), on a resolution on dairy farming (rejected), an amendment to the farming law (rejected) and a federal resolution on spending (approved).

The last three were held on 25 June on an amendment to the federal law on aged and bereaved insurance (approved), a popular initiative to extend aged and bereaved and invalidity insurance (rejected) and an amendment to the federal law on purchasing land through agents abroad (rejected).

== Results ==
Month	Question	For		Against		Blank/invalid		Total	Registered voters	Turnout	Cantons for		Cantons against	
Month	Question	Votes	%	Votes	%	Blank	Invalid	Total	Registered voters	Turnout	Full	Half	Full	Half
March	Federal resolution on popular initiative	836,215	49.1	866,107	50.9	32,030	4,543	1,738,895	4,583,930	37.9	8	2	12	4
March	Resolution on dairy farming	620,745	36.5	1,078,607	63.5	34,956	4,647	1,738,955	4,583,930	37.9				
March	Amendment to the farming law	569,950	33.6	1,126,721	66.4	37,002	4,680	1,738,353	4,583,930	37.9				
March	Federal resolution on spending	1,390,831	83.4	277,225	16.6	61,545	5,665	1,735,266	4,583,930	37.9	20	6	0	0
June	Amendment to federal law on insurance	1,110,053	60.7	718,349	39.3	21,621	6,140	1,856,163	4,591,795	40.4				
June	Popular initiative on extending insurance	499,266	27.6	1,307,302	72.4	39,614	6,538	1,852,720	4,591,795	40.3	0	0	20	6
June	Amendment to the federal law on land purchases	834,673	46.4	962,702	53.6	48,577	6,675	1,852,627	4,591,795	40.3				
Source: Nohlen
