= 1887 Swiss referendums =

Two referendums were held in Switzerland in 1887. The first was held on 15 May, asking voters whether they approved of a federal law on spirits, and was approved by 65.9% of voters. The second was held on 10 July, asking voters whether they approved of an amendment made to article 64 of the federal constitution, and was approved by 77.9% of voters and 20.5 cantons.

== Background ==
The spirits referendum was an optional referendum, which meant that only a majority of the public vote was required for the proposal to be approved. The constitutional referendum was a mandatory referendum, which required both a majority of voters and cantons.

== Results ==
=== Federal spirits law ===
Choice	Votes	%
For	267,122	65.9
Against	138,496	34.1
Invalid votes		–
Total	405,618	100
Registered voters/turnout	649,494	
Source: Nohlen & Stöver

=== Constitutional amendment ===
Choice	Popular vote		Cantons		
Choice	Votes	%	Full	Half	Total
For	203,506	77.9	18	5	20.5
Against	57,862	22.1	1	1	1.5
Invalid/blank votes	12,978	–	–	–	–
Total	274,346	100	19	6	22
Registered voters/turnout	647,071	42.4	–	–	–
Source: Nohlen & Stöver
