= 1979 Swiss referendums =

Six referendums were held in Switzerland in 1979. The first four were held on 18 February on reducing the voting age to 18 (rejected), a popular initiative "for the promotion of footpaths and hiking trails" (approved), "against advertising for addictive drugs" (rejected) and "for ensuring people's rights and the security of nuclear power installations" (rejected).

The last two were held on 20 May on reforms to sales and direct federal taxation (rejected) and a federal resolution on the nuclear power law (approved).

== Results ==
=== February: Reducing the voting age to 18 ===
Choice	Popular vote		Cantons		
Choice	Votes	%	Full	Half	Total
For	934,073	49.2	8	2	9
Against	964,749	50.8	12	4	14
Blank votes	17,641	–	–	–	–
Invalid votes	1,259	–	–	–	–
Total	1,917,722	100	20	6	23
Registered voters/turnout	3,867,603	49.6	–	–	–
Source: Nohlen & Stöver

=== February: Popular initiative on footpaths and hiking trails ===
Choice	Popular vote		Cantons		
Choice	Votes	%	Full	Half	Total
For	1,467,357	77.6	19	6	22
Against	424,058	22.4	1	0	1
Blank votes	23,651	–	–	–	–
Invalid votes	1,463	–	–	–	–
Total	1,916,529	100	20	6	23
Registered voters/turnout	3,867,603	49.6	–	–	–
Source: Nohlen & Stöver

=== February: Popular initiative against advertising addictive drugs ===
Choice	Popular vote		Cantons		
Choice	Votes	%	Full	Half	Total
For	773,485	41.0	0	1	0.5
Against	1,115,116	59.0	20	5	22.5
Blank votes	26,247	–	–	–	–
Invalid votes	1,697	–	–	–	–
Total	1,916,545	100	20	6	23
Registered voters/turnout	3,867,603	49.6	–	–	–
Source: Nohlen & Stöver

=== February: Popular initiative on people's rights and nuclear power installations ===
Choice	Popular vote		Cantons		
Choice	Votes	%	Full	Half	Total
For	920,480	48.8	8	2	9
Against	965,927	51.2	12	4	14
Blank votes	29,400	–	–	–	–
Invalid votes	1,755	–	–	–	–
Total	1,917,562	100	20	6	23
Registered voters/turnout	3,867,603	49.6	–	–	–
Source: Nohlen & Stöver

=== May: Changes to sales and direct federal taxation ===
Choice	Popular vote		Cantons		
Choice	Votes	%	Full	Half	Total
For	496,882	34.6	0	0	0
Against	939,533	65.4	20	6	23
Blank votes	21,817	–	–	–	–
Invalid votes	1,690	–	–	–	–
Total	1,459,922	100	20	6	23
Registered voters/turnout	3,876,719	37.7	–	–	–
Source: Nohlen & Stöver

=== May: Nuclear power law ===
Choice	Votes	%
For	982,634	68.9
Against	444,422	31.1
Blank votes	30,169	–
Invalid votes	1,930	–
Total	1,459,155	100
Registered voters/turnout	3,876,719	37.6
Source: Nohlen & Stöver
