= 1897 Swiss referendums =

Three referendums were held in Switzerland during 1897. The first was held on 28 February on a federal law establishing a Central Bank, and was rejected by a majority of voters. The second and third were held on 11 July concerning an amendment to article 24 of the constitution and on legislation on potentially harmful foodstuffs and stimulants. Both were approved by a majority of voters and cantons.

== Background ==
The referendums on the constitutional amendment and the foodstuffs legislation were mandatory referendums, which required a double majority; a majority of the popular vote and majority of the cantons. The decision of each canton was based on the vote in that canton. Full cantons counted as one vote, whilst half cantons counted as half. The Central Bank referendum was an optional referendum, which required only a majority of the public vote.

== Results ==
=== Central Bank ===
Choice	Votes	%
For	195,764	43.3
Against	255,984	56.7
Blank votes	8,198	–
Invalid votes	2,197	–
Total	462,143	100
Registered voters/turnout	715,342	64.6
Source: Nohlen & Stöver

=== Amendment to article 24 of the constitution ===
Choice	Popular vote		Cantons		
Choice	Votes	%	Full	Half	Total
For	156,102	63.5	14	4	16
Against	89,561	36.5	5	2	6
Blank votes	25,444	–	–	–	–
Invalid votes	6,077	–	–	–	–
Total	277,184	100	19	6	22
Registered voters/turnout	716,883	38.7	–	–	–
Source: Nohlen & Stöver

=== Legislation on foodstuffs and stimulants ===
Choice	Popular vote		Cantons		
Choice	Votes	%	Full	Half	Total
For	162,250	65.1	16	5	18.5
Against	86,955	34.9	3	1	3.5
Blank votes	24,023	–	–	–	–
Invalid votes	4,624	–	–	–	–
Total	277,852	100	19	6	22
Registered voters/turnout	716,883	38.8	–	–	–
Source: Nohlen & Stöver
