= 1988 Swiss referendums =

Five referendums were held in Switzerland in 1988. The first two were held on 12 June on a federal resolution on the constitutional principles behind a co-ordinated transport policy and on a popular initiative on lowering the retirement age to 62 for men and 60 for women. Both were rejected by voters. The final three referendums were held on 3 December on three popular initiatives "against real estate speculation", "for the shortening of labour time" and on limiting immigration. All three were rejected.

== Results ==
=== June: Co-ordinated transport policy ===
Choice	Votes	%
For	797,955	45.5
Against	955,300	54.5
Blank votes	32,243	–
Invalid votes	2,627	–
Total	1,788,125	100
Registered voters/turnout	4,267,923	41.9
Source: Nohlen & Stöver

=== June: Lowering the retirement age ===
Choice	Popular vote		Cantons		
Choice	Votes	%	Full	Half	Total
For	624,390	35.1	2	0	2
Against	1,153,540	64.9	18	6	21
Blank votes	12,892	–	–	–	–
Invalid votes	2,609	–	–	–	–
Total	1,793,431	100	20	6	23
Registered voters/turnout	4,267,923	42.0	–	–	–
Source: Nohlen & Stöver

=== December: Popular initiative against real estate speculation ===
Choice	Popular vote		Cantons		
Choice	Votes	%	Full	Half	Total
For	686,398	30.8	0	0	0
Against	1,543,705	69.2	20	6	23
Blank votes	31,548	–	–	–	–
Invalid votes	2,278	–	–	–	–
Total	2,263,924	100	20	6	23
Registered voters/turnout	4,285,419	52.8	–	–	–
Source: Nohlen & Stöver

=== December: Popular initiative on shortening working hours ===
Choice	Popular vote		Cantons		
Choice	Votes	%	Full	Half	Total
For	769,264	34.3	2	0	2
Against	1,475,536	65.7	18	6	21
Blank votes	18,677	–	–	–	–
Invalid votes	1,913	–	–	–	–
Total	2,265,390	100	20	6	23
Registered voters/turnout	4,285,419	52.9	–	–	–
Source: Nohlen & Stöver

=== December: Popular initiative on limiting immigration ===
Choice	Popular vote		Cantons		
Choice	Votes	%	Full	Half	Total
For	731,929	32.7	0	0	0
Against	1,506,492	67.3	20	6	23
Blank votes	23,752	–	–	–	–
Invalid votes	2,143	–	–	–	–
Total	2,264,316	100	20	6	23
Registered voters/turnout	4,285,419	52.8	–	–	–
Source: Nohlen & Stöver
