= 1952 Swiss referendums =

Nine referendums were held in Switzerland during 1952. The first was held on 2 March on a federal resolution on changing the licensing requirements for new pubs, and was rejected by 54% of voters. The second was held on 30 March on a federal law on promoting agriculture and the farming community, and was approved by 54% of voters. The third was held on 20 April on a popular initiative on a "commodity sales tax", and was rejected by 81% of voters. The fourth was held on 18 May on a popular initiative "for the finance of armaments and the protection of social achievements", and was rejected by 56% of voters. The fifth was held on 6 July on a federal resolution on the coverage of expenditure on weapons, and was rejected by 58% of voters. The sixth and seventh were both held on 5 October on making an amendment to the federal law on Aged and Bereavement insurance regarding tobacco taxation, and on establishing air raid shelters in buildings. The first was approved by 68% of voters, whilst the second was rejected by 85%. The eighth and ninth were both held on 23 November on a limited prolongation of some price controls and a federal resolution on bread supply. Both were approved by voters.

== Results ==
=== March: Changes to licensing for new pubs ===
Choice	Votes	%
For	248,318	46.1
Against	290,520	53.9
Blank votes	27,302	–
Invalid votes	1,354	–
Total	567,494	100
Registered voters/turnout	1,415,536	40.1
Source: Nohlen & Stöver

=== March: Federal law on promoting agriculture ===
Choice	Votes	%
For	483,583	54.0
Against	411,178	46.0
Blank votes	13,253	–
Invalid votes	1,826	–
Total	909,840	100
Registered voters/turnout	1,418,381	64.1
Source: Nohlen & Stöver

=== April: Commodity sales tax ===
Choice	Popular vote		Cantons		
Choice	Votes	%	Full	Half	Total
For	129,243	19.0	0	0	0
Against	552,122	81.0	19	6	22
Blank votes	13,769	–	–	–	–
Invalid votes	1,360	–	–	–	–
Total	696,494	100	19	6	22
Registered voters/turnout	1,417,918	49.1	–	–	–
Source: Nohlen & Stöver

=== May: Popular initiatives on armaments and social achievements ===
Choice	Popular vote		Cantons		
Choice	Votes	%	Full	Half	Total
For	328,341	43.7	3	2	4
Against	422,255	56.3	16	4	18
Blank votes	12,869	–	–	–	–
Invalid votes	1,376	–	–	–	–
Total	764,841	100	19	6	22
Registered voters/turnout	1,418,727	53.9	–	–	–
Source: Nohlen & Stöver

=== July: Weapons expenditure ===
Choice	Popular vote		Cantons		
Choice	Votes	%	Full	Half	Total
For	256,195	42.0	3	0	3
Against	353,522	58.0	16	6	19
Blank votes	16,798	–	–	–	–
Invalid votes	881	–	–	–	–
Total	627,396	100	19	6	22
Registered voters/turnout	1,419,573	44.2	–	–	–
Source: Nohlen & Stöver

=== October: Aged and bereavement insurance ===
Choice	Votes	%
For	492,885	68.0
Against	232,007	32.0
Blank votes	22,427	–
Invalid votes	1,233	–
Total	748,552	100
Registered voters/turnout	1,422,239	52.6
Source: Nohlen & Stöver

=== October: Air raid shelters ===
Choice	Votes	%
For	110,681	15.5
Against	603,917	84.5
Blank votes	32,724	–
Invalid votes	1,230	–
Total	748,552	100
Registered voters/turnout	1,422,239	52.6
Source: Nohlen & Stöver

=== November: Price controls ===
Choice	Popular vote		Cantons		
Choice	Votes	%	Full	Half	Total
For	489,461	62.8	14	2	15
Against	289,837	37.2	5	4	7
Blank votes	21,818	–	–	–	–
Invalid votes	2,160	–	–	–	–
Total	803,276	100	19	6	22
Registered voters/turnout	1,423,658	56.4	–	–	–
Source: Nohlen & Stöver

=== November: Bread supply ===
Choice	Popular vote		Cantons		
Choice	Votes	%	Full	Half	Total
For	583,546	75.6	19	5	21.5
Against	188,044	24.4	0	1	0.5
Blank votes	29,537	–	–	–	–
Invalid votes	2,149	–	–	–	–
Total	803,276	100	19	6	22
Registered voters/turnout	1,423,658	56.4	–	–	–
Source: Nohlen & Stöver
