= 1957 Swiss referendums =

Four referendums were held in Switzerland during 1957. The first two were held on 3 March on a federal resolutions on introducing two new articles to the federal constitution; 22bis concerning civil protection and 36bis on radio and television. Both were rejected. The third and fourth were held on 24 November on introducing another article to the constitution (24 quinquies concerning nuclear power and protection from radiation) and a federal resolution on prolonging the federal breadstuffs law. Both were approved.

== Results ==
=== March: Constitutional amendment on civil protection ===
Choice	Popular vote		Cantons		
Choice	Votes	%	Full	Half	Total
For	361,028	48.1	12	4	14
Against	389,633	51.9	7	2	8
Blank votes	25,384	–	–	–	–
Invalid votes	1,670	–	–	–	–
Total	777,715	100	19	6	22
Registered voters/turnout	1,464,540	53.1	–	–	–
Source: Nohlen & Stöver

=== March: Constitutional amendment on radio and television ===
Choice	Popular vote		Cantons		
Choice	Votes	%	Full	Half	Total
For	319,766	42.8	9	3	10.5
Against	428,080	57.2	10	3	11.5
Blank votes	26,199	–	–	–	–
Invalid votes	1,418	–	–	–	–
Total	775,463	100	19	6	22
Registered voters/turnout	1,464,540	52.9	–	–	–
Source: Nohlen & Stöver

=== November: Constitutional amendment on nuclear power ===
Choice	Popular vote		Cantons		
Choice	Votes	%	Full	Half	Total
For	491,745	77.3	19	6	22
Against	144,151	22.7	0	0	0
Blank votes	30,487	–	–	–	–
Invalid votes	1,459	–	–	–	–
Total	667,842	100	19	6	22
Registered voters/turnout	1,469,328	45.5	–	–	–
Source: Nohlen & Stöver

=== November: Prolonging the federal breadstuffs law ===
Choice	Popular vote		Cantons		
Choice	Votes	%	Full	Half	Total
For	401,768	62.7	19	5	21.5
Against	239,295	37.3	0	1	0.5
Blank votes	25,985	–	–	–	–
Invalid votes	1,315	–	–	–	–
Total	668,363	100	19	6	22
Registered voters/turnout	1,469,328	45.5	–	–	–
Source: Nohlen & Stöver
