= Environmental protection =

Practice of protecting the natural environment

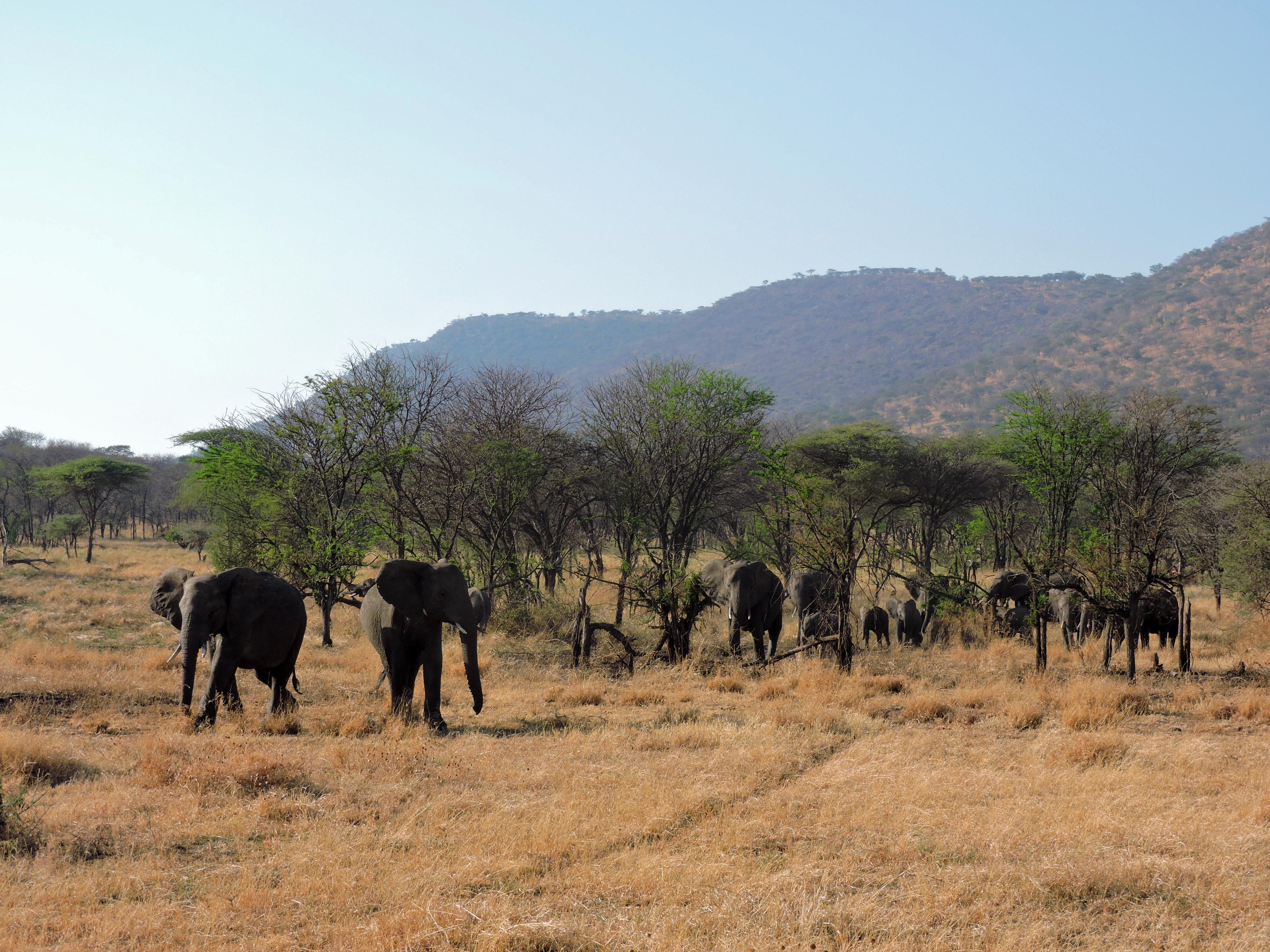
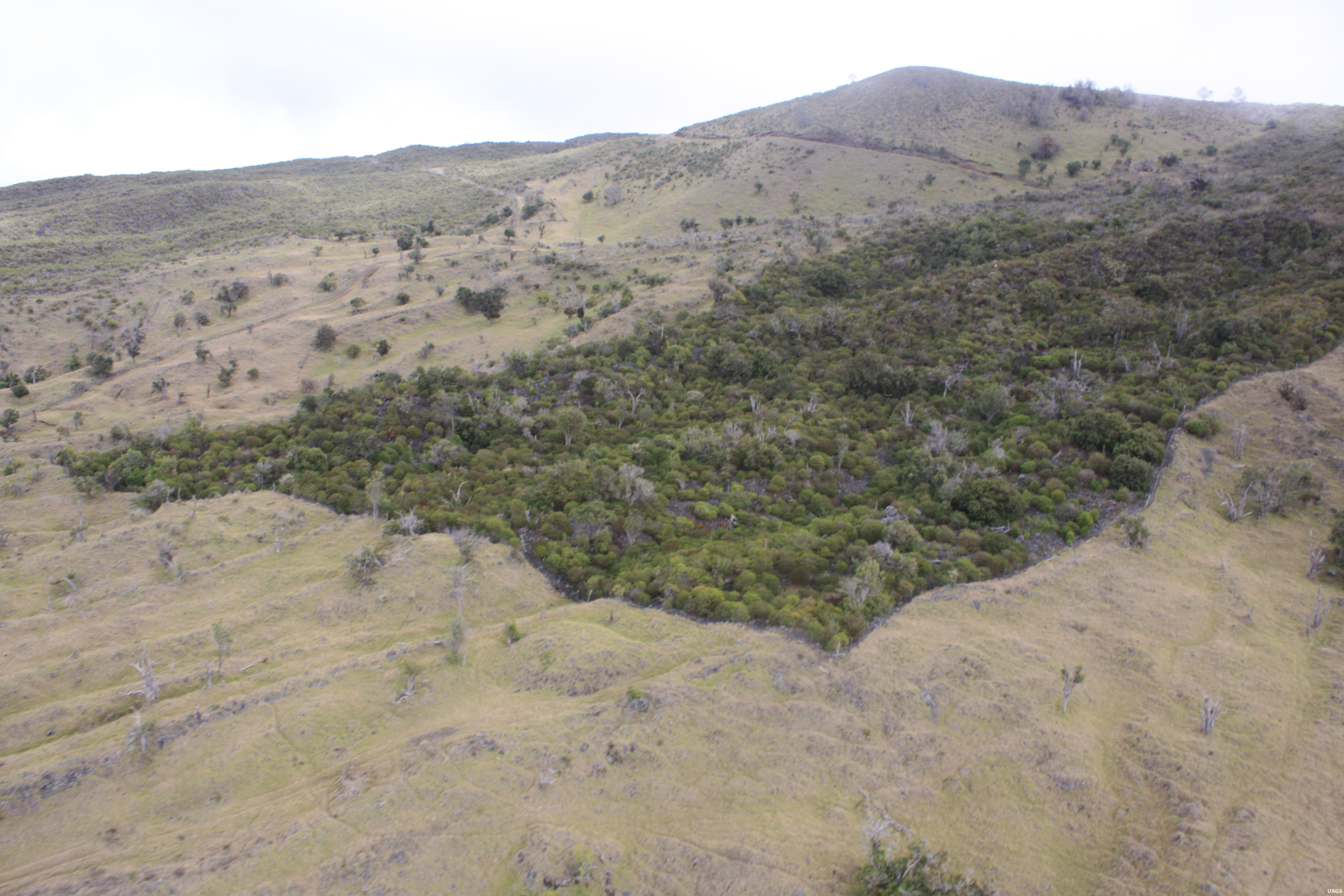
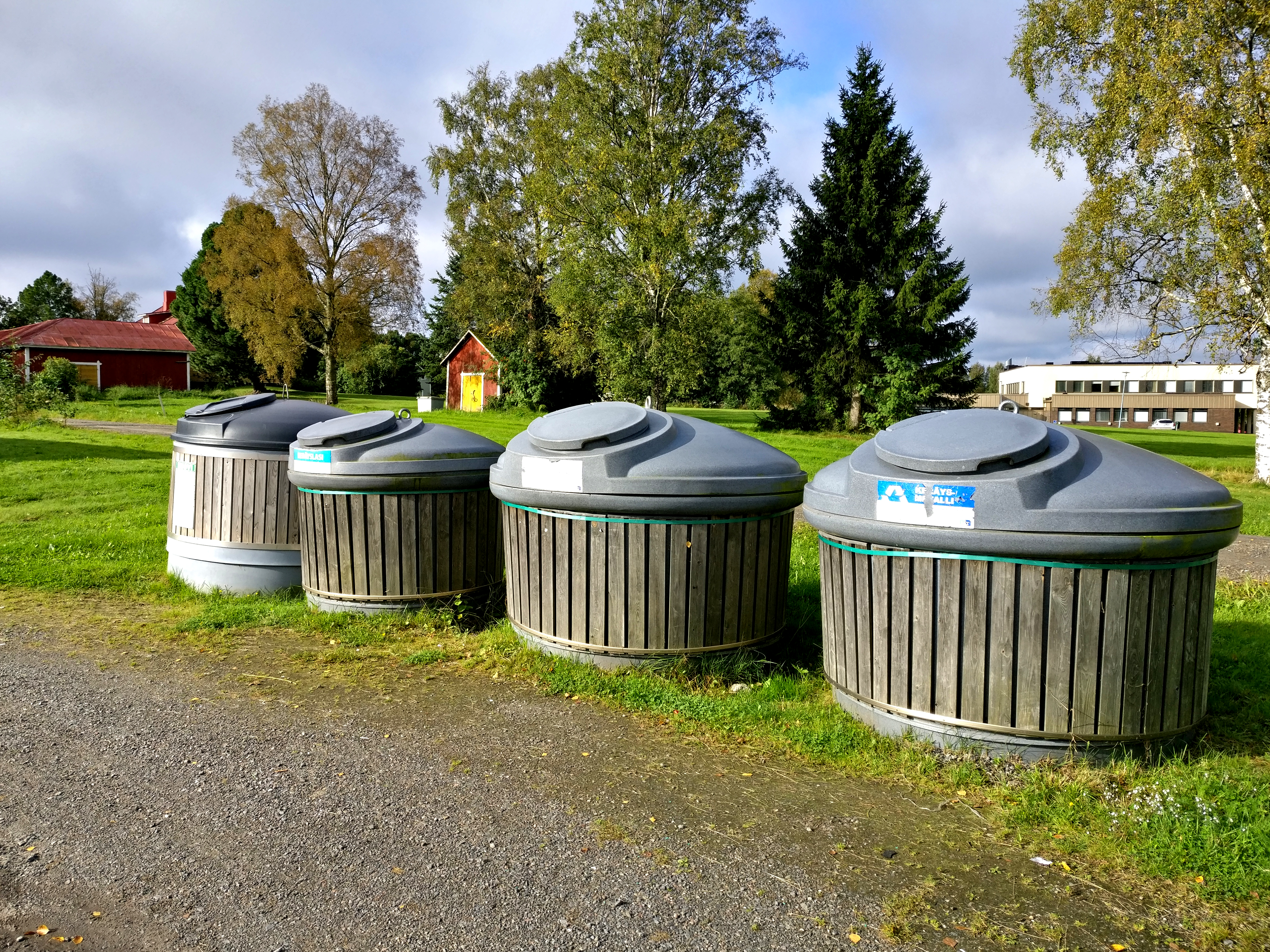
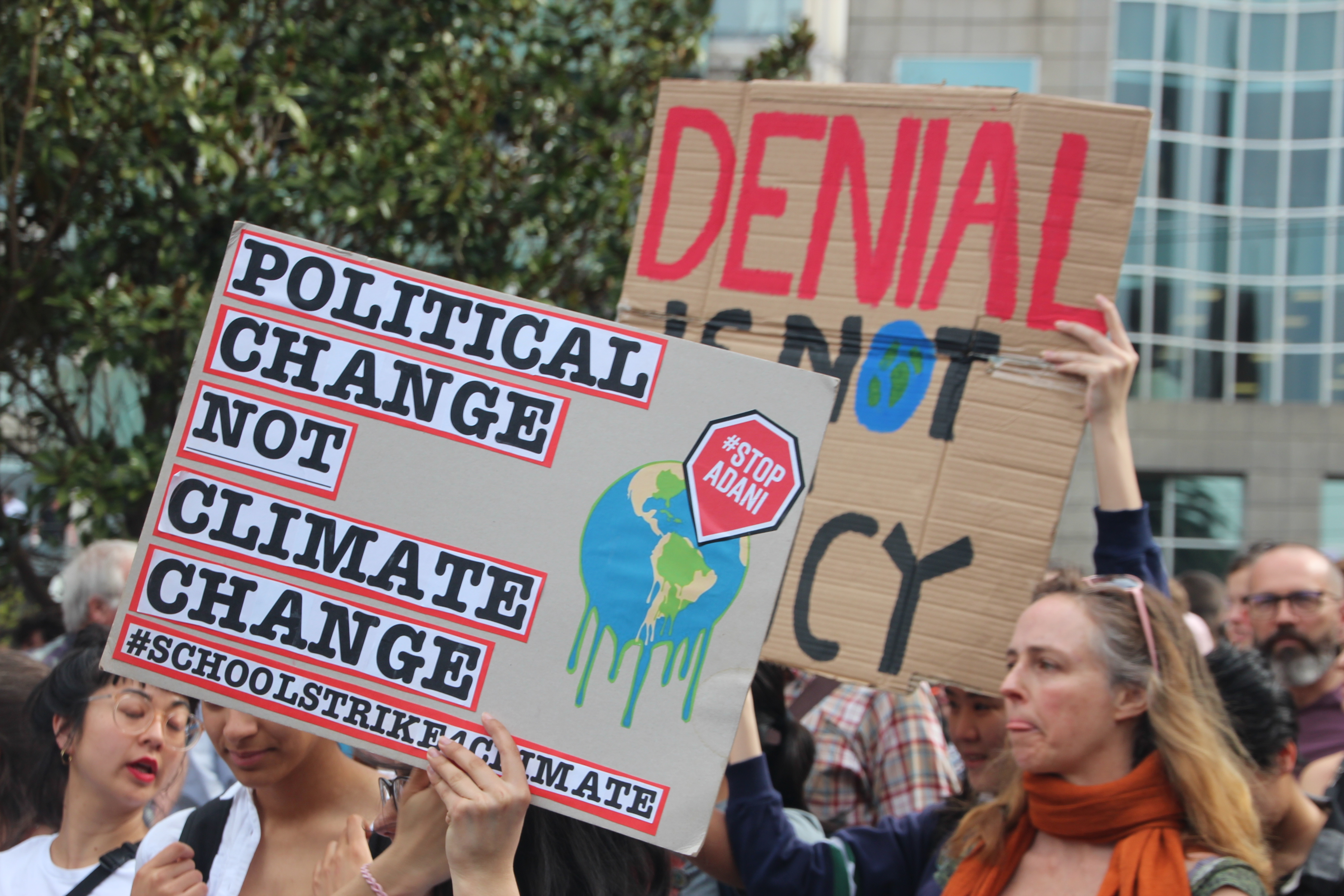
Various aspects of environmental protection: wildlife in the Serengeti National Park of Tanzania, forest restoration in Hawaii, waste recycling point in Finland and a climate strike demonstration in Australia.

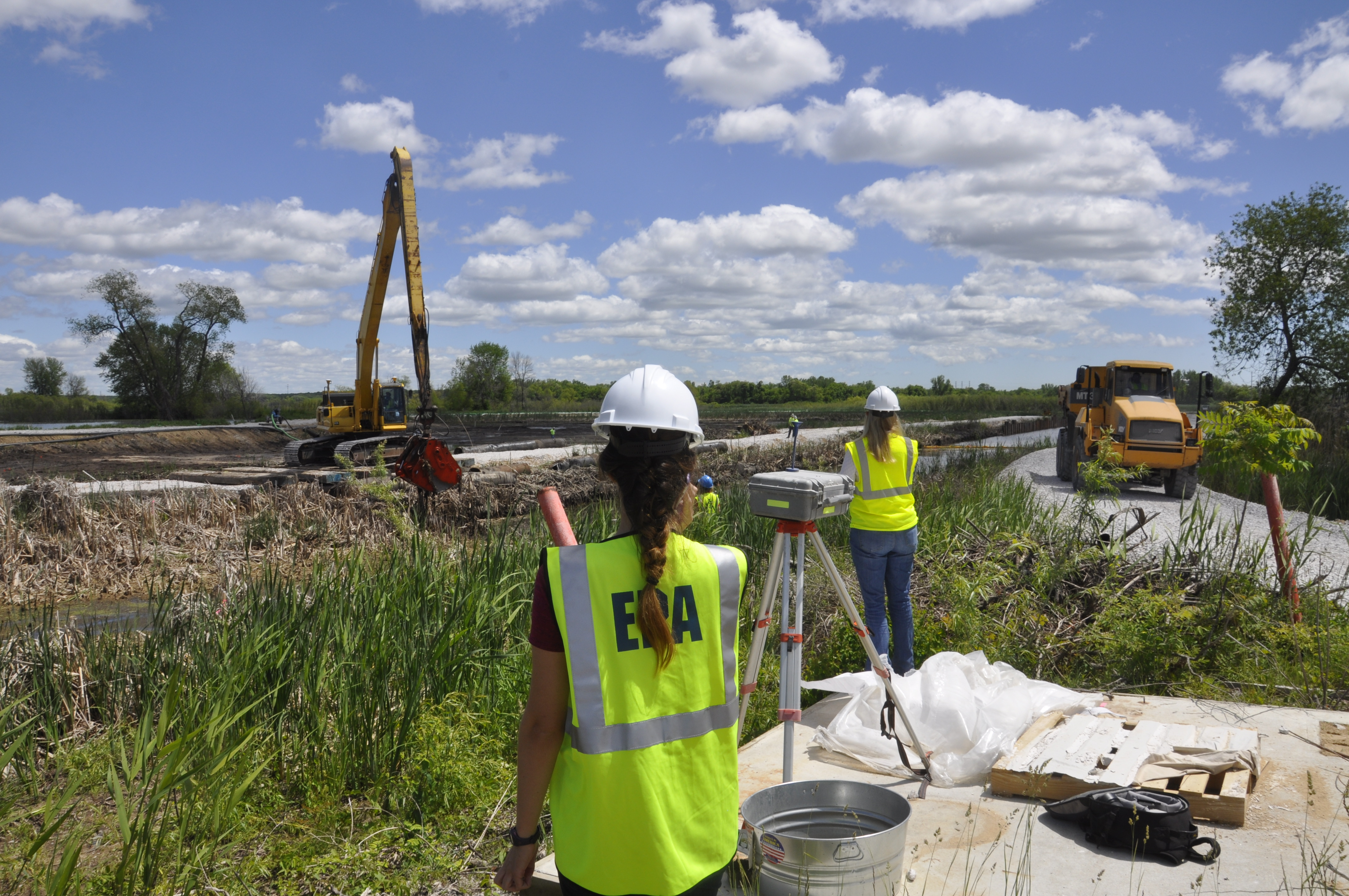
Wetlands remediation at a former oil refinery is just one example of environmental protection.

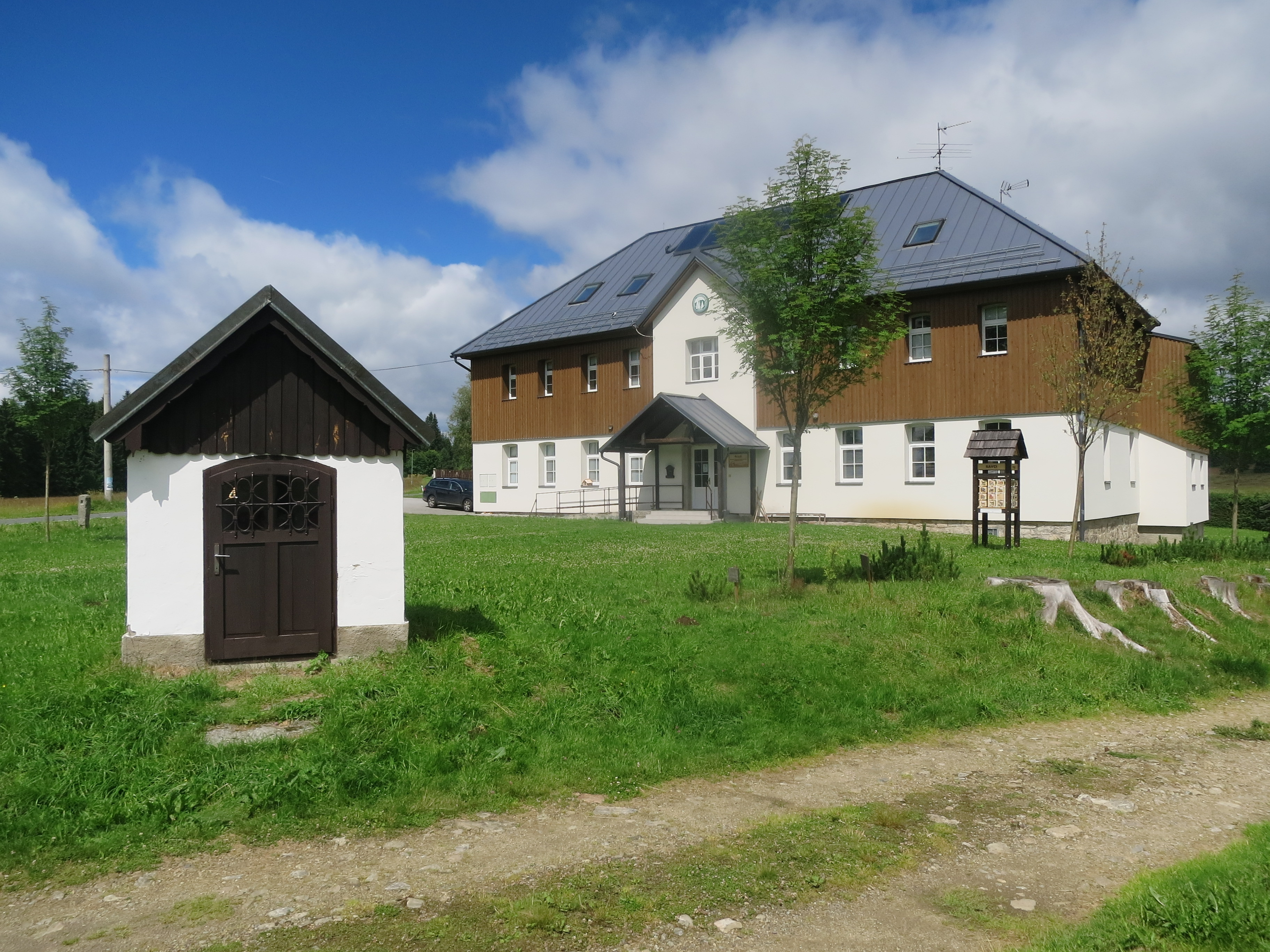
Environmental Education Center, originally a school built in 1897

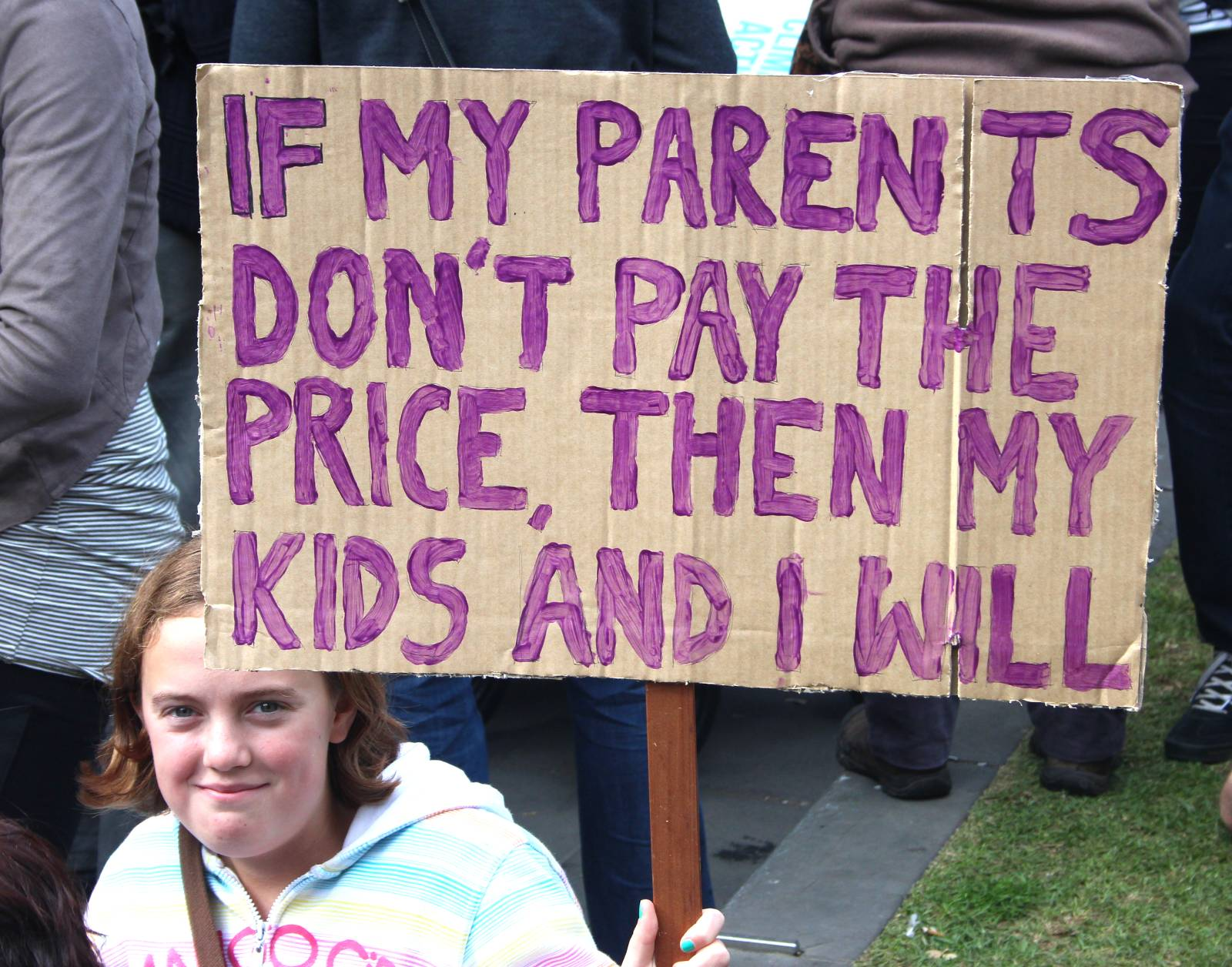
If my parents don't pay the price... - Melbourne World Environment Day 2011

Environmental protection, or environment protection, refers to the taking of measures to protect the natural environment, prevent pollution and maintain ecological balance. Action may be taken by individuals, advocacy groups and governments. Objectives include the conservation of the existing natural environment and natural resources and, when possible, repair of damage and reversal of harmful trends.

Due to the pressures of overconsumption, population growth and technology, the biophysical environment is being degraded, sometimes permanently. This has been recognized, and governments have begun placing restraints on activities that cause environmental degradation. Since the 1960s, environmental movements have created more awareness of the multiple environmental problems. There is disagreement on the extent of the environmental impact of human activity, so protection measures are occasionally debated.

== Approaches ==
=== Voluntary agreements ===
In industrial countries, voluntary environmental agreements often provide a platform for companies to be recognized for moving beyond the minimum regulatory standards and thus support the development of the best environmental practice. For instance, in India, Environment Improvement Trust (EIT) has been working for environmental and forest protection since 1998. In developing countries, such as those in Latin America, these agreements are more commonly used to remedy significant levels of non-compliance with mandatory regulation.

=== Ecosystems approach ===
An ecosystems approach to resource management and environmental protection aims to consider the complex interrelationships of an entire ecosystem in decision-making rather than simply responding to specific issues and challenges. Ideally, the decision-making processes under such an approach would be a collaborative approach to planning and decision-making that involves a broad range of stakeholders across all relevant governmental departments, as well as industry representatives, environmental groups, and community. This approach ideally supports a better exchange of information, development of conflict-resolution strategies and improved regional conservation. Religions also play an important role in the conservation of the environment: for example, the Catholic Church's Compendium on its social teaching states that "environmental protection cannot be assured solely on the basis of financial calculations of costs and benefits. The environment is one of those goods that cannot be adequately safeguarded or promoted by market forces."

=== International agreements ===
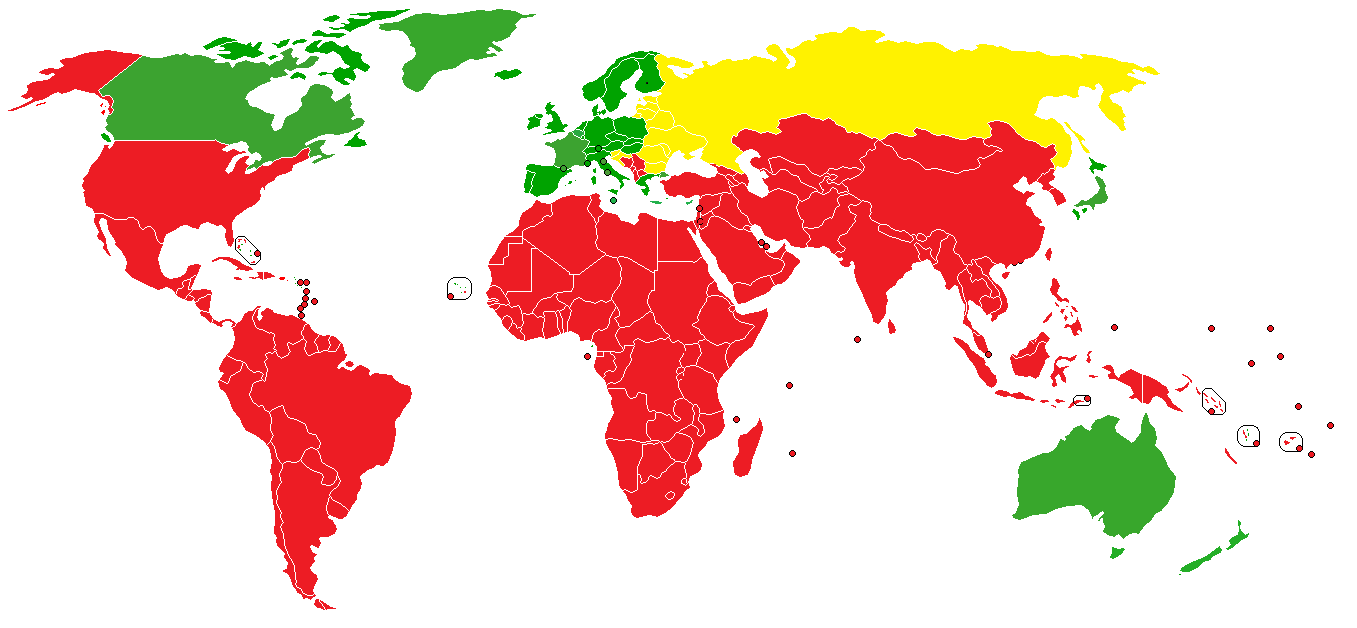
Kyoto Protocol Commitment map 2010

Many of the earth's resources are especially vulnerable because they are influenced by human impacts across different countries. As a result of this, many attempts are made by countries to develop agreements that are signed by multiple governments to prevent damage or manage the impacts of human activity on natural resources. This can include agreements that impact factors such as climate, oceans, rivers and air pollution. These international environmental agreements are sometimes legally binding documents that have legal implications when they are not followed and, at other times, are more agreements in principle or are for use as codes of conduct. These agreements have a long history with some multinational agreements being in place from as early as 1910 in Europe, America and Africa.

Many of the international technical agencies formed after 1945 addressed environmental themes. By the late 1960s, a growing environmental movement called for coordinated and institutionalized international cooperation. The landmark United Nations Conference on the Human Environment was held in Stockholm in 1972, establishing the concept of a right to a healthy environment. It was followed by the creation of the United Nations Environment Programme later that year. Some of the most well-known international agreements include the Kyoto Protocol of 1997 and the Paris Agreement of 2015.

On 8 October 2021, the UN Human Rights Council passed a resolution recognizing access to a healthy and sustainable environment as a universal right. In the resolution 48/13, the Council called on States around the world to work together, and with other partners, to implement the newly recognized right.

On 28 July 2022, the United Nations General Assembly voted to declare the ability to live in "a clean, healthy and sustainable environment" a universal human right.

== Government ==
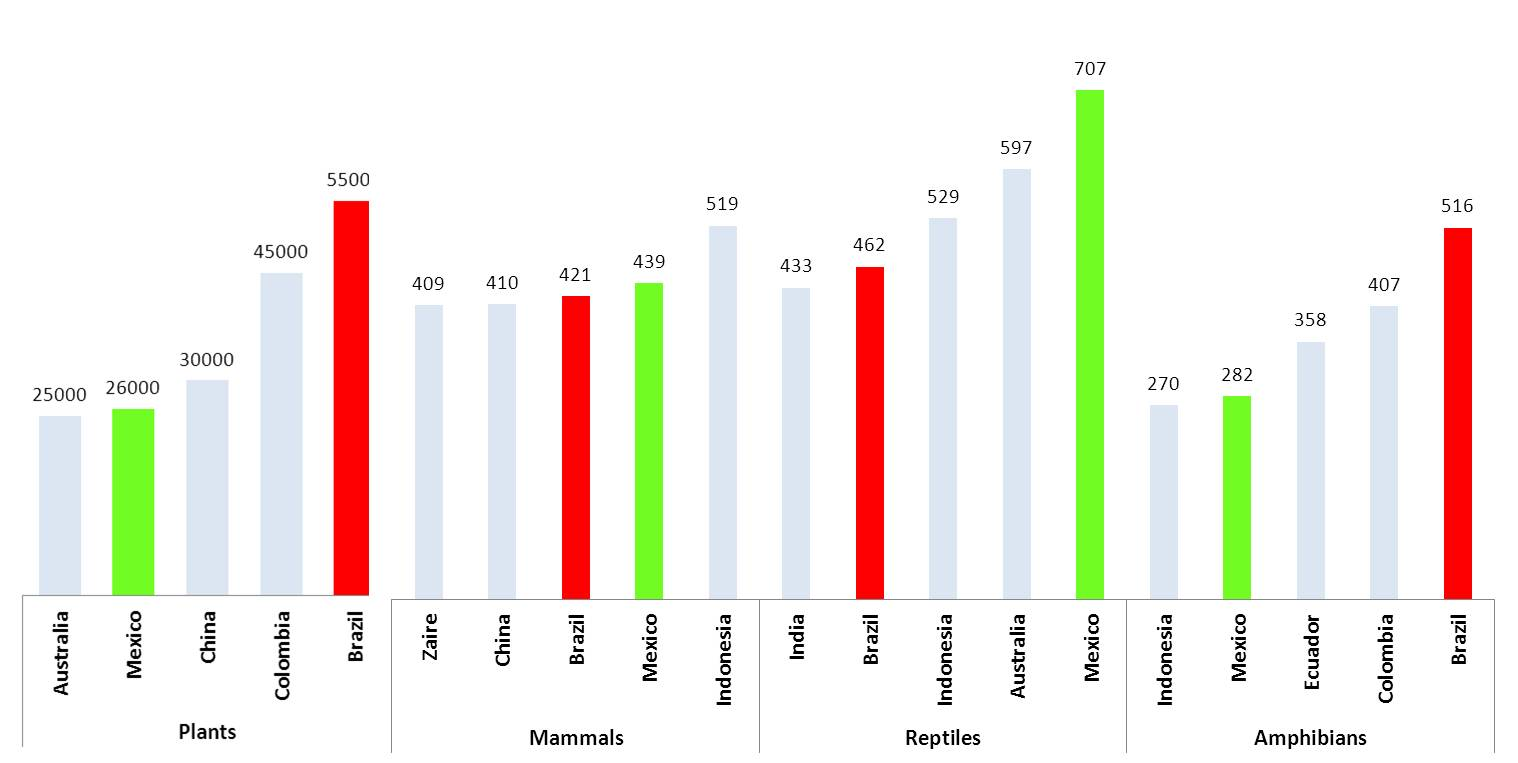
Top five countries by biological diversity

Discussion concerning environmental protection often focuses on the role of government, legislation, and law enforcement. However, in its broadest sense, environmental protection may be seen to be the responsibility of all the people and not simply that of government. Decisions that impact the environment will ideally involve a broad range of stakeholders including industry, indigenous groups, environmental group and community representatives. Gradually, environmental decision-making processes are evolving to reflect this broad base of stakeholders and are becoming more collaborative in many countries.

=== Africa ===
==== Tanzania ====
Many constitutions acknowledge Tanzania as having some of the greatest biodiversity of any African country. Almost 40% of the land has been established into a network of protected areas, including several national parks. The concerns for the natural environment include damage to ecosystems and loss of habitat resulting from population growth, expansion of subsistence agriculture, pollution, timber extraction and significant use of timber as fuel.

Environmental protection in Tanzania began during the German occupation of East Africa (1884–1919)—colonial conservation laws for the protection of game and forests were enacted, whereby restrictions were placed upon traditional indigenous activities such as hunting, firewood collecting, and cattle grazing. In 1948, Serengeti has officially established the first national park for wild cats in East Africa. Since 1983, there has been a more broad-reaching effort to manage environmental issues at a national level, through the establishment of the National Environment Management Council (NEMC) and the development of an environmental act.

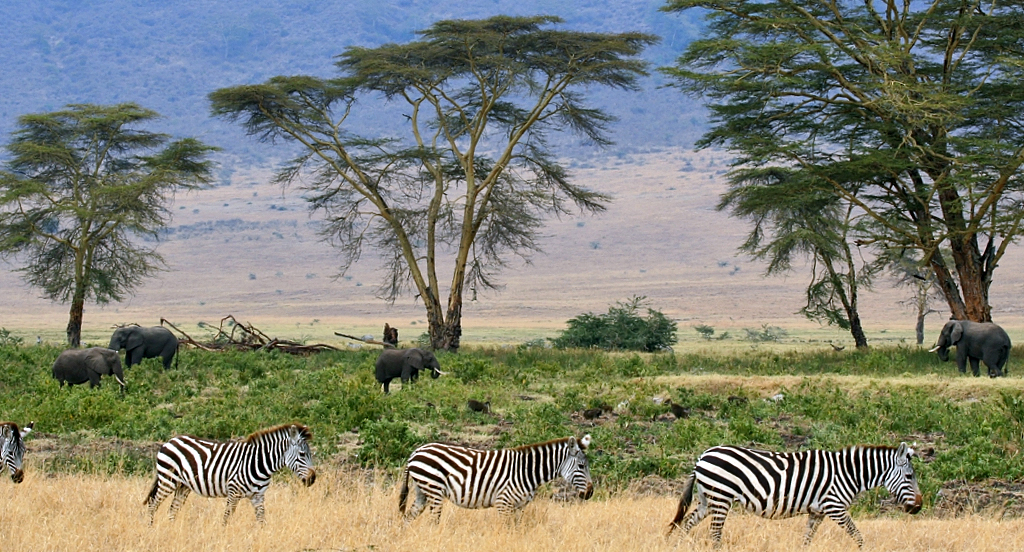
Zebras at the Serengeti savana plains in northern part of Tanzania

Division of the biosphere is the main government body that oversees protection. It does this through the formulation of policy, coordinating and monitoring environmental issues, environmental planning and policy-oriented environmental research. The National Environment Management Council (NEMC) is an institution that was initiated when the National Environment Management Act was first introduced in year 1983. This council has the role to advise governments and the international community on a range of environmental issues. The NEMC the following purposes: provide technical advice; coordinate technical activities; develop enforcement guidelines and procedures; assess, monitor and evaluate activities that impact the environment; promote and assist environmental information and communication; and seek advancement of scientific knowledge.

The National Environment Policy of 1997 acts as a framework for environmental decision making in Tanzania. The policy objectives are to achieve the following:

- Ensure sustainable and equitable use of resources without degrading the environment or risking health or safety.
- Prevent and control degradation of land, water, vegetation and air.
- Conserve and enhance natural and man-made heritage, including biological diversity of unique ecosystems.
- Improve condition and productivity of degraded areas.
- Raise awareness and understanding of the link between environment and development.
- Promote individual and community participation.
- Promote international cooperation.
- Use ecofriendly resources.

Tanzania is a signatory to a significant number of international conventions including the Rio Declaration on Development and Environment 1992 and the Convention on Biological Diversity 1996. The Environmental Management Act, 2004, is the first comprehensive legal and institutional framework to guide environmental-management decisions. The policy tools that are parts of the act include the use of environmental-impact assessments, strategics environmental assessments, and taxation on pollution for specific industries and products. The effectiveness of shifting of this act will only become clear over time as concerns regarding its implementation become apparent based on the fact that, historically, there has been a lack of capacity to enforce environmental laws and a lack of working tools to bring environmental-protection objectives into practice, with empirical research highlighting that poor enforcement mechanisms (84%) and socioeconomic hardships (88%) remain as primary barriers to compliance.

=== Asia ===
==== China ====
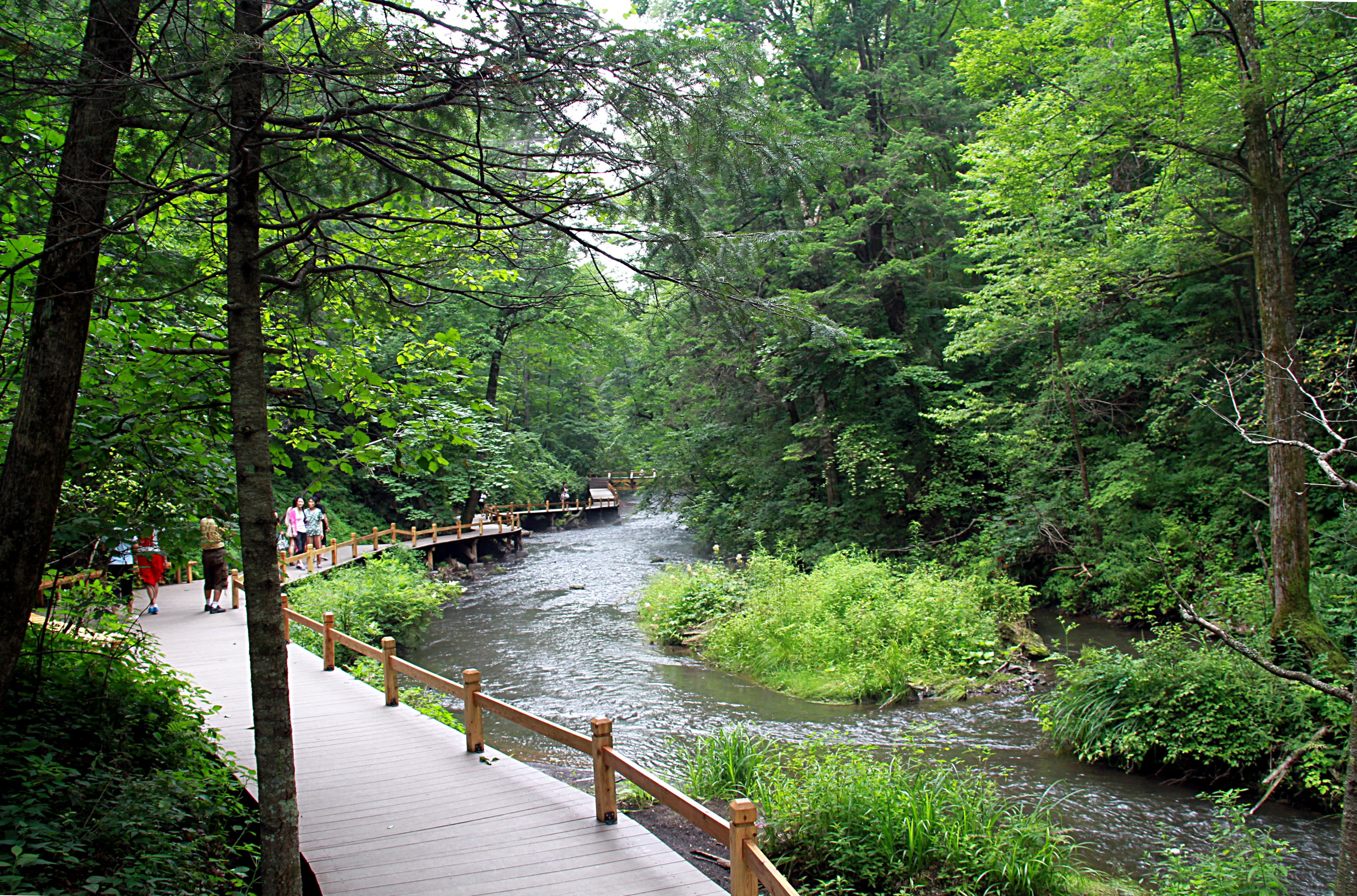
The Longwanqun National Forest Park is a nationally protected nature area in Huinan County, Jilin, China.

Formal environmental protection in China House was first stimulated by the 1972 United Nations Conference on the Human Environment held in Stockholm, Sweden. Following this, they began establishing environmental protection agencies and putting controls on some of its industrial waste.

In 1973, China held its First National Conference on Environmental Protection. It emphasized "complete utilization" as the central principle of environmental protection in China. Complete utilization was a waste-recycling and production efficiency principle that had developed in the 1950s as a response to material scarcity in the early PRC; its underlying philosophy was expressed in the slogan "turning waste into treasure and harm into benefit."

China was one of the first developing countries to implement a sustainable development strategy. In 1983 the State Council announced that environmental protection would be one of China's basic national policies and in 1984 the National Environmental Protection Agency (NEPA) was established. Following severe flooding of the Yangtze River basin in 1998, NEPA was upgraded to the State Environmental Protection Agency (SEPA) meaning that environmental protection was now being implemented at a ministerial level. In 2008, SEPA became known by its current name of Ministry of Environmental Protection of the People's Republic of China (MEP).

Pollution control instruments in China
Command-and-control	Economic incentives	Voluntary instruments	Public participation
Concentration-based pollution discharge controls	Pollution levy fee	Environmental labeling system	Clean-up campaign
Mass-based controls on total provincial discharge	Non-compliance fines	ISO 14000 system	Environmental awareness campaign
Environmental impact assessments (EIA)	Discharge permit system	Cleaner production	Air pollution index
Three synchronization program	Sulfur emission fee	NGOs	Water quality disclosure
Deadline transmission trading		Administrative permission hearing	
Centralized pollution control	Subsidies for energy saving products		
Two compliance policy	Regulation on refuse credit to high-polluting firms		
Environmental compensation fee			

Environmental pollution and ecological degradation has resulted in economic losses for China. In 2005, economic losses (mainly from air pollution) were calculated at 7.7% of China's GDP. This grew to 10.3% by 2002 and the economic loss from water pollution (6.1%) began to exceed that caused by air pollution. China has been one of the top performing countries in terms of GDP growth (9.64% in the past ten years). However, the high economic growth has put immense pressure on its environment and the environmental challenges that China faces are greater than most countries. In 2021 it was noted that China was the world's largest greenhouse gas emitter, while also facing additional environmental challenges which included illegal logging, wildlife trafficking, plastic waste, ocean pollution, environmental-related mismanagement, unregulated fishing, and the consequences associated with being the world's largest mercury polluter. All these factors contribute to climate change and habitat loss. In 2022 China was ranked 160th out of 180 countries on the Environmental Performance Index due to poor air quality and high GHG emissions.

Ecological and environmental degradation in China have health related impacts; for example, if current pollution levels continue, Chinese citizens will lose 3.6 billion total life years. Another issue is that non-transmittable diseases among Chinese, which cause at least 80% of 10.3 million annual deaths, are worsened by air pollution.

China has taken initiatives to increase its protection of the environment and combat environmental degradation:

- China's investment in renewable energy grew 18% in 2007 to $15.6 billion, accounting for ~10% of the global investment in this area;
- In 2008, spending on the environment was 1.49% of GDP, up 3.4 times from 2000;
- The discharge of CO (carbon monoxide) and SO2 (sulfur dioxide) decreased by 6.61% and 8.95% in 2008 compared with that in 2005;
- China's protected nature reserves have increased substantially. In 1978 there were only 34 compared with 2,538 in 2010. The protected nature reserve system now occupies 15.5% of the country; this is higher than the world average.

Rapid growth in GDP has been China's main goal during the past three decades with a dominant development model of inefficient resource use and high pollution to achieve high GDP. For China to develop sustainably, environmental protection should be treated as an integral part of its economic policies.

Quote from Shengxian Zhou, head of MEP (2009): "Good economic policy is good environmental policy and the nature of environmental problem is the economic structure, production form and develop model."

Since around 2010 China appears to be placing a greater emphasis on environmental and ecological protection. For example, former CCP General Secretary Hu Jintao's report at the 2012 CCP National Congress added a section focusing on party policy on ecological issues.

CCP General Secretary Xi Jinping's report at the 19th CCP National Congress in 2017 noted recent progress in ecological and environmental conservation and restoration, the importance of ecologically sustainable development and global ecological security, and the need to provide ecological goods to meet people's growing demands. Most importantly, Xi Jinping has suggested clearly identifiable methods to meet the ecological demands of the country. Some of the solutions he notes are the need for the development and facilitation of: ecological corridors, biodiversity protection networks, redlines for protecting ecosystems, market-based mechanisms for ecological compensation in addition to afforestation, greater crop rotation, recycling, waste reduction, stricter pollution standards, and greener production and technology. The report at the 19th CCP National Congress isn't simply the personal thoughts from Xi Jinping, it's a product of a long process of compromise and negotiation among competing party officials and leaders.

Additionally, the Third Plenum of the CCP in 2013 included a manifesto that placed extreme emphasis on reforming management of the environment, promising to create greater transparency of those polluting, and placing environmental criteria above GDP growth for local official evaluations.

Reform has not come cheap for China. In 2016, it was noted that in response to pollution and oversupply, China laid off around six million workers in state-owned enterprises and spent $23 billion to cover layoffs specifically for coal and steel companies between 2016 and 2019. While expensive, other benefits of environmental protection have been noticed beyond impacting citizens' health. For example, in the long run, environmental protection has been found to generally improve job quality of migrant workers by reducing their work intensity, while increasing social security and job quality.

Different local governments in China implement different approaches to solving the issue of ecological protection, sometimes with negative consequences for the citizens. For example, a prefecture in the Shanxi province imposed bans, and potential legal detentions or steep fines for violations, on coal-burning by villagers. Although the government provided free gas-heaters often the villagers were unable to afford to run them. In Wuhan, automated surveillance technology and video is used to catch illegal fishing, and in some cities not recycling results in negative social credit points. It is unclear in some of these instances if citizens have any potential routes for recourse.

News in 2023 has found that the Chinese Communist Party's recent war on pollution has already brought substantial and measurable impacts, including China's particulate pollution levels dropping 42% from 2013 levels and increasing the average lifespan expectancy of citizens by an estimated 2.2 years.

==== India ====
The Constitution of India has a number of provisions demarcating the responsibility of the Central and State governments towards Environmental Protection. The state's responsibility with regard to environmental protection has been laid down under article 48-A of the constitution which stated that "The states shall endeavor to protect and improve the environment and to safeguard the forest and wildlife of the country".

Environmental protection has been made a fundamental duty of every citizen of India under Article 51-A (g) of the constitution which says "It shall be the duty of every citizen of India to protect and improve the natural environment including forests, lakes, rivers, and wildlife and to have compassion for living creatures".

Article 21 of the constitution is a fundamental right, which states that "No person shall be deprived of his life or personal liberty except according to the procedure established by law".

Some of Acts for Environment protections are as follows

1) The Environment Protection Act 1986

2)Water (Prevention & Control of Pollution) Act 1974

3) The Air (Prevention & Control of Pollution) Act 1981, amended 1987

4) Noise Pollution (Regulation and Control) Rules 2000

5) Hazardous and other Wastes (Management & Transboundary Movement) Rules,2016

6) Solid waste Management Rules 2016

==== Middle East ====
The Middle Eastern countries become part of the joint Islamic environmental action, which was initiated in 2002 in Jeddah. Under the Islamic Educational, Scientific and Cultural Organization, the member states join the Islamic Environment Ministers Conference in every two years, focusing on the importance of environment protection and sustainable development. The Arab countries are also awarded the title of best environment management in the Islamic world.

In August 2019, the Sultanate of Oman won the award for 2018–19 in Saudi Arabia, citing its project "Verifying the Age and Growth of Spotted Small Spots in the Northwest Coast of the Sea of Oman".

==== Russia ====
In Russia, environmental protection is considered an integral part of national safety. The Federal Ministry of Natural Resources and Ecology is the authorized state body tasked with managing environmental protection. However, there are a lot of environmental issues in Russia.

=== Europe ===
==== European Union ====
Environmental protection has become an important task for the institutions of the European Community after the Maastricht Treaty for the European Union ratification by all of its member states. The EU is active in the field of environmental policy, issuing directives such as those on environmental impact assessment and on access to environmental information for citizens in the member states.

==== Ireland ====
The Environmental Protection Agency, Ireland (EPA) has a wide range of functions to protect the environment, with its primary responsibilities including:

- Environmental licensing
- Enforcement of environmental law
- Environmental planning, education, and guidance
- Monitoring, analyzing and reporting on the environment
- Regulating Ireland's greenhouse gas emissions
- Environmental research development
- Strategic environmental assessment
- Waste management
- Radiological protection

=== Legislation ===
In 1874, an article to protect forests was introduced in the Swiss Federal Constitution. In 1962, a constitutional article was introduced for the protection of nature.

In 1967, the Federal Act on the Protection of Nature and Cultural Heritage introduced notably the right of appeal of environmental organizations ("entitlement to appeal", article 12) which gives all Swiss organizations concerned with nature protection the right to raise general objections or to file appeals against some projects. The right of environmental organizations to appeal was later also included in the Federal Act on the Protection of the Environment (1985, article 55) and the Federal Act on Non-Human Gene Technology (2004, article 28).

In 1971, a constitutional article for the protection of the environment was approved by 92.7 per cent of voters (article 24, currently article 74 of the constitution of 1999) and the Federal Office for the Environment, Forests and Landscape (renamed Federal Office for the Environment in 2006) was founded (as part of the Department of Transport, Communications and Energy).

The Federal Inventory of Landscapes and Natural Monuments was introduced in 1977.

On 21 May 2017, 58 per cent of Swiss voters accepted the new Energy Act establishing the energy strategy 2050 (energy transition) and forbidding the construction of new nuclear power plants.

==== Popular initiatives ====
Several federal popular initiative were launched to increase environmental protection. Several of them were accepted:

- Federal popular initiative "for the protection of marsh" ("Rothenthurm initiative"), accepted by 57.8 per cent of voters on 6 December 1987. For the protection of wetlands.
- Federal popular initiative "stop the construction of nuclear power plants (moratorium)", accepted by 54.5 per cent of voters on 23 September 1990. For a ten-year moratorium on the construction of new nuclear plants.
- Federal popular initiative "for the protection of alpine areas against transit traffic" ("Alps initiative"), accepted by 51.9 per cent of voters on 20 February 1994. To protect the Alpine environment from the negative impact of traffic (see also Gotthard Base Tunnel).
- Federal popular initiative "for food produced without genetic engineering", accepted by 55.7 per cent of voters on 27 November 2005. For a moratorium on the culture of genetically modified organisms.
- Federal popular initiative "to end the invasive construction of second homes" ("Franz Weber initiative"), accepted by 50.6 per cent of voters on 12 March 2012. To reduce urban sprawl by limiting the number of second homes (with a quota of twenty per cent per commune).

The environmental protection in Switzerland is mainly based on the measures to be taken against global warming. The pollution in Switzerland is mainly the pollution caused by vehicles and the litteration by tourists.

=== Latin America ===
The United Nations Environment Programme (UNEP) has identified 17 megadiverse countries. The list includes six Latin American countries: Brazil, Colombia, Ecuador, Mexico, Peru and Venezuela. Mexico and Brazil stand out among the rest because they have the largest area, population and number of species. These countries represent a major concern for environmental protection because they have high rates of deforestation, ecosystems loss, pollution, and population growth.

==== Brazil ====
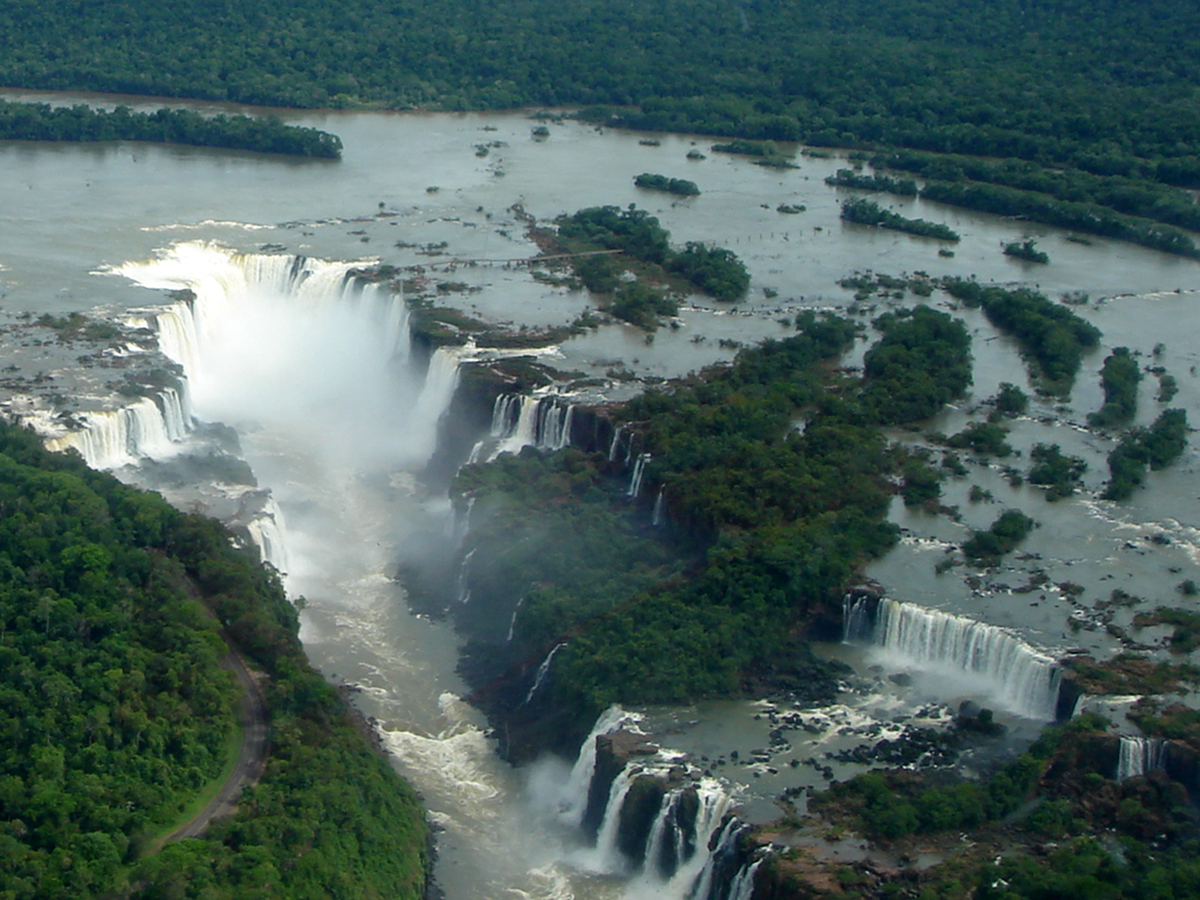
Panorama of the Iguazu Falls in Brazil

Brazil has the largest amount of the world's tropical forests, 4,105,401 km^{2} (48.1% of Brazil), concentrated in the Amazon region. Brazil is home to vast biological diversity, first among the megadiverse countries of the world, having between 15% and 20% of the 1.5 million globally described species.

The organization in charge of environment protection is the Brazilian Ministry of the Environment (in Portuguese: Ministério do Meio Ambiente, MMA). It was first created in the year 1973 with the name Special Secretariat for the Environment (Secretaria Especial de Meio Ambiente), changing names several times, and adopting the final name in the year 1999. The Ministry is responsible for addressing the following issues:

- A national policy for the environment and for water resources;
- A policy for the preservation, conservation and sustainable use of ecosystems, biodiversity, and forests;
- Proposing strategies, mechanisms, economic and social instruments for improving environmental quality, and sustainable use of natural resources;
- Policies for integrating production and the environment;
- Environmental policies and programs for the Legal Amazon;
- Ecological and economic territorial zoning.

In 2011, protected areas of the Amazon covered 2,197,485 km^{2} (an area larger than Greenland), with conservation units, like national parks, accounting for just over half (50.6%) and indigenous territories representing the remaining 49.4%.

==== Mexico ====
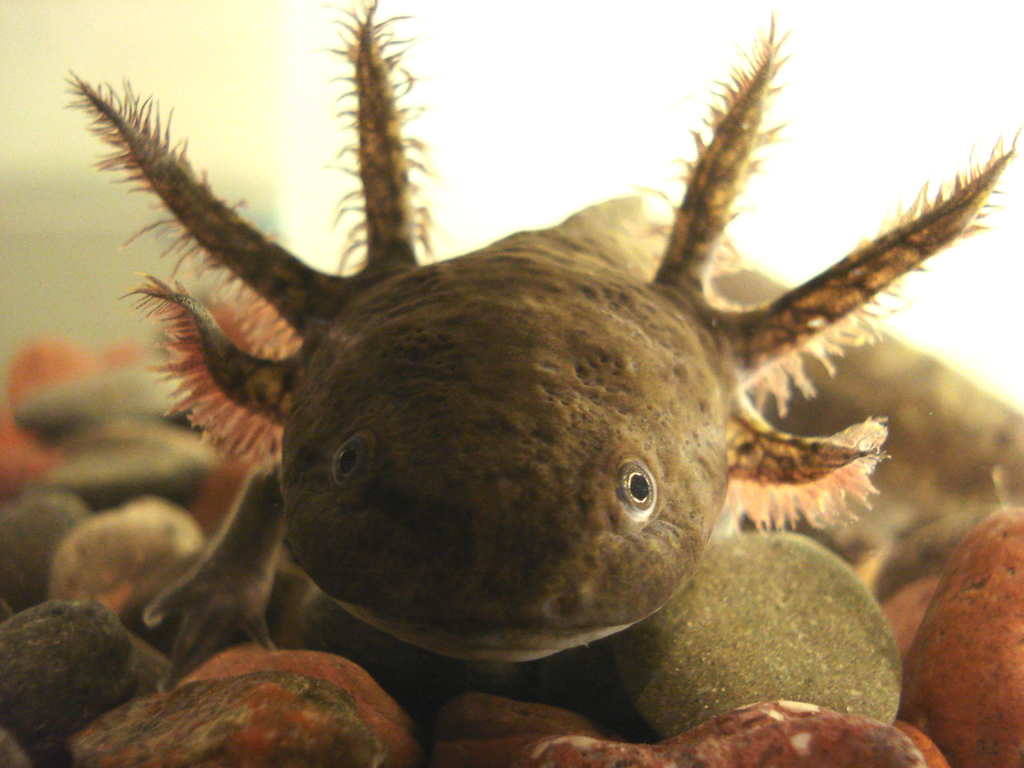
The axolotl is an endemic species from the central part of Mexico.

With over 200,000 different species, Mexico is home to 10–12% of the world's biodiversity, ranking first in reptile biodiversity and second in mammals—one estimate indicates that over 50% of all animal and plant species live in Mexico.

The history of environmental policy in Mexico started in the 1940s with the enactment of the Law of Conservation of Soil and Water (in Spanish: Ley de Conservación de Suelo y Agua). Three decades later, at the beginning of the 1970s, the Law to Prevent and Control Environmental Pollution was created (Ley para Prevenir y Controlar la Contaminación Ambiental).

In the year 1972 was the first direct response from the federal government to address eminent health effects from environmental issues. It established the administrative organization of the Secretariat for the Improvement of the Environment (Subsecretaría para el Mejoramiento del Ambiente) in the Department of Health and Welfare.

The Secretariat of Environment and Natural Resources (Secretaría del Medio Ambiente y Recursos Naturales, SEMARNAT) is Mexico's environment ministry. The Ministry is responsible for addressing the following issues:

- Promote the protection, restoration, and conservation of ecosystems, natural resources, goods, and environmental services and facilitate their use and sustainable development.
- Develop and implement a national policy on natural resources
- Promote environmental management within the national territory, in coordination with all levels of government and the private sector.
- Evaluate and provide determination to the environmental impact statements for development projects and prevention of ecological damage
- Implement national policies on climate change and protection of the ozone layer.
- Direct work and studies on national meteorological, climatological, hydrological, and geohydrological systems, and participate in international conventions on these subjects.
- Regulate and monitor the conservation of waterways

In November 2000 there were 127 protected areas; currently there are 174, covering an area of 25,384,818 hectares, increasing federally protected areas from 8.6% to 12.85% of its land area.

=== Oceania ===
==== Australia ====
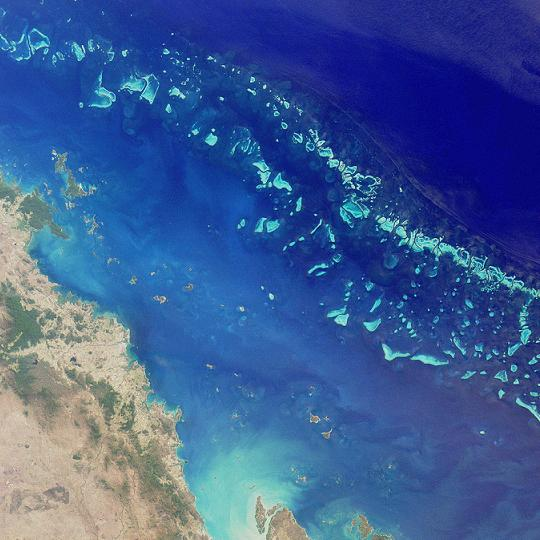
The Great Barrier Reef in Australia is the largest barrier reef in the world.

In 2008, there was 98,487,116 ha of terrestrial protected area, covering 12.8% of the land area of Australia. The 2002 figures of 10.1% of terrestrial area and 64,615,554 ha of protected marine area were found to poorly represent about half of Australia's 85 bioregions.

Environmental protection in Australia could be seen as starting with the formation of the first national park, Royal National Park, in 1879. More progressive environmental protection had it start in the 1960s and 1970s with major international programs such as the United Nations Conference on the Human Environment in 1972, the Environment Committee of the OECD in 1970, and the United Nations Environment Programme of 1972. These events laid the foundations by increasing public awareness and support for regulation. State environmental legislation was irregular and deficient until the Australian Environment Council (AEC) and Council of Nature Conservation Ministers (CONCOM) were established in 1972 and 1974, creating a forum to assist in coordinating environmental and conservation policies between states and neighbouring countries. These councils have since been replaced by the Australian and New Zealand Environment and Conservation Council (ANZECC) in 1991 and finally the Environment Protection and Heritage Council (EPHC) in 2001.

At a national level, the Environment Protection and Biodiversity Conservation Act 1999 is the primary environmental protection legislation for the Commonwealth of Australia. It concerns matters of national and international environmental significance regarding flora, fauna, ecological communities and cultural heritage. It also has jurisdiction over any activity conducted by the Commonwealth, or affecting it, that has significant environmental impact. The act covers eight main areas:

- National Heritage Sites
- World Heritage Sites
- Ramsar wetlands
- Nationally endangered or threatened species and ecological communities
- Nuclear activities and actions
- Great Barrier Reef Marine Park
- Migratory species
- Commonwealth marine areas

There are several Commonwealth protected lands due to partnerships with traditional native owners, such as Kakadu National Park, extraordinary biodiversity such as Christmas Island National Park, or managed cooperatively due to cross-state location, such as the Australian Alps National Parks and Reserves.

At a state level, the bulk of environmental protection issues are left to the responsibility of the state or territory. Each state in Australia has its own environmental protection legislation and corresponding agencies. Their jurisdiction is similar and covers point source pollution, such as from industry or commercial activities, land/water use, and waste management. Most protected lands are managed by states and territories with state legislative acts creating different degrees and definitions of protected areas such as wilderness, national land and marine parks, state forests, and conservation areas. States also create regulation to limit and provide general protection from air, water, and sound pollution.

At a local level, each city or regional council has responsibility over issues not covered by state or national legislation. This includes non-point source, or diffuse pollution, such as sediment pollution from construction sites.

Australia ranks second place on the UN 2010 Human Development Index and one of the lowest debt to GDP ratios of the developed economies. This could be seen as coming at the cost of the environment, with Australia being the world leader in coal exportation and species extinctions. Some have been motivated to proclaim it is Australia's responsibility to set the example of environmental reform for the rest of the world to follow.

==== New Zealand ====
At a national level, the Ministry for the Environment is responsible for environmental policy and the Department of Conservation addresses conservation issues. At a regional level the regional councils administer the legislation and address regional environmental issues.

=== United States ===
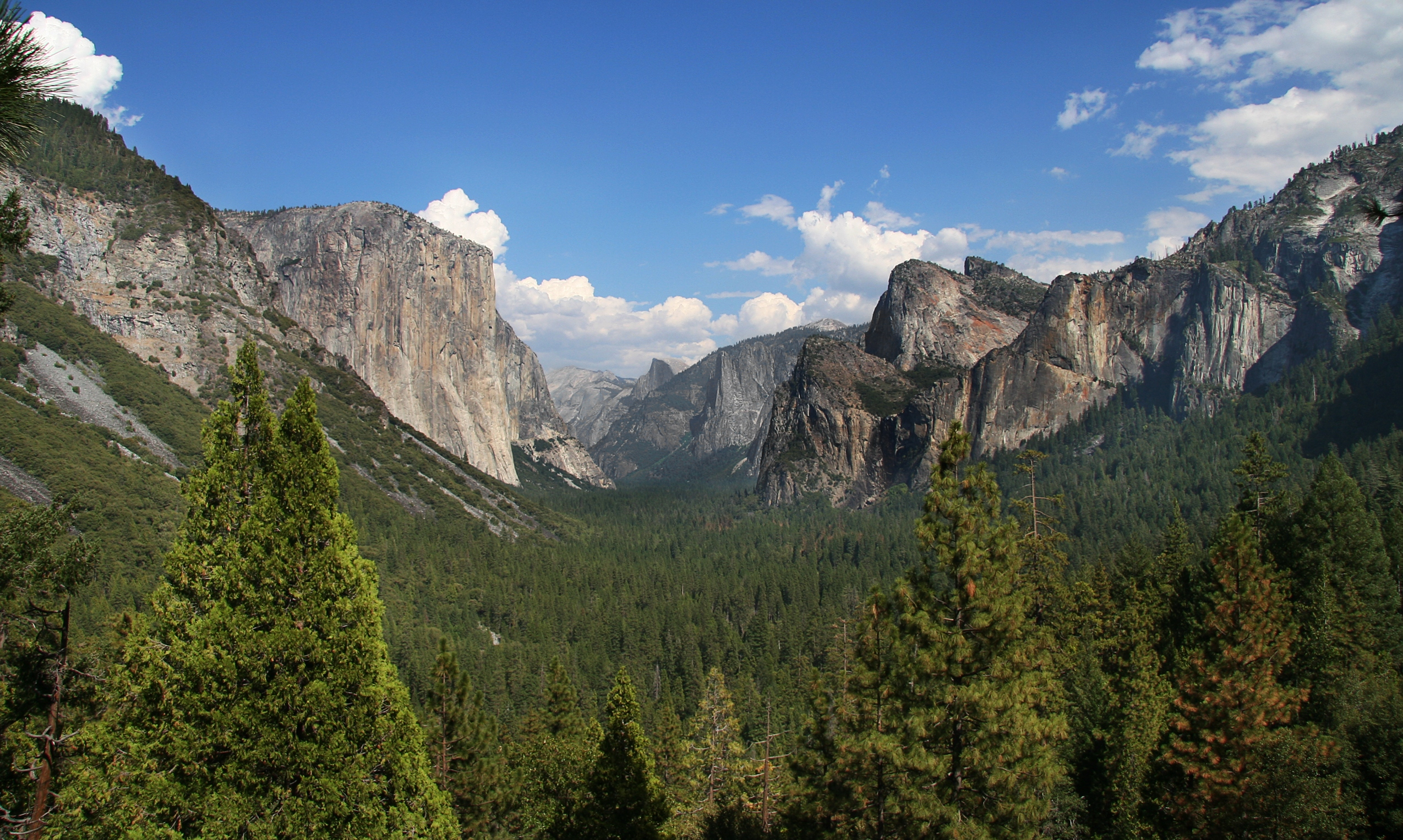
Yosemite National Park in California, one of the first protected areas in the United States

Since 1970, the United States Environmental Protection Agency (EPA) has been working to protect the environment and human health.

The Environmental Protection Agency (EPA) is an independent executive agency of the United States federal government tasked with environmental protection matters.

All US states have their own state-level departments of environmental protection, which may issue regulations more stringent than the federal ones.

In January 2010, EPA Administrator Lisa P. Jackson published via the official EPA blog her "Seven Priorities for EPA's Future", which were (in the order originally listed):

- Taking action on climate change
- Improving air quality
- Assuring the safety of chemicals
- Cleaning up [US] communities
- Protecting America's waters
- Expanding the conversation on environmentalism and working for environmental justice
- Building strong state and tribal partnerships

As of 2019, it is unclear whether these still represent the agency's active priorities, as Jackson departed in February 2013, and the page has not been updated in the interim.

== In literature ==
There are numerous works of literature that contain the themes of environmental protection but some have been fundamental to its evolution. Several pieces such as A Sand County Almanac by Aldo Leopold, "Tragedy of the commons" by Garrett Hardin, and Silent Spring by Rachel Carson have become classics due to their far reaching influences. The conservationist and Nobel laureate Wangari Muta Maathai devoted her 2010 book Replenishing the Earth to the Green Belt Movement and the vital importance of trees in protecting the environment.

The subject of environmental protection is present in fiction as well as non-fictional literature. Books such as Antarctica and Blockade have environmental protection as subjects whereas The Lorax has become a popular metaphor for environmental protection. "The Limits of Trooghaft" by Desmond Stewart is a short story that provides insight into human attitudes towards animals. Another book called The Martian Chronicles by Ray Bradbury investigates issues such as bombs, wars, government control, and what effects these can have on the environment.

== See also ==
- Anti-consumerism
- Anti-environmentalism
- Biocentrism (ethics)
- Biodiversity
- Carbon offset
- Circular economy
- Citizen Science, cleanup projects that people can take part in.
- Climate change mitigation
- Conservation biology
- Conservation movement
- Earth Day
- Environmental education
- Environmental globalization
- Environmental governance
- Environmental law
- Environmental movement
- Environmental organizations
- Environmental personhood
- Environmental racism
- Environmentalism
- Green economy
- Green politics
- Green solutions
- Greening
- List of environmental issues
- List of environmental organizations
- List of environmental topics
- List of international environmental agreements
- Natural capital
- Natural resource management
- Nature conservation
- Proforestation
- Sustainability
- Tree planting
- World Environment Day
