= Environmental movement in Switzerland =

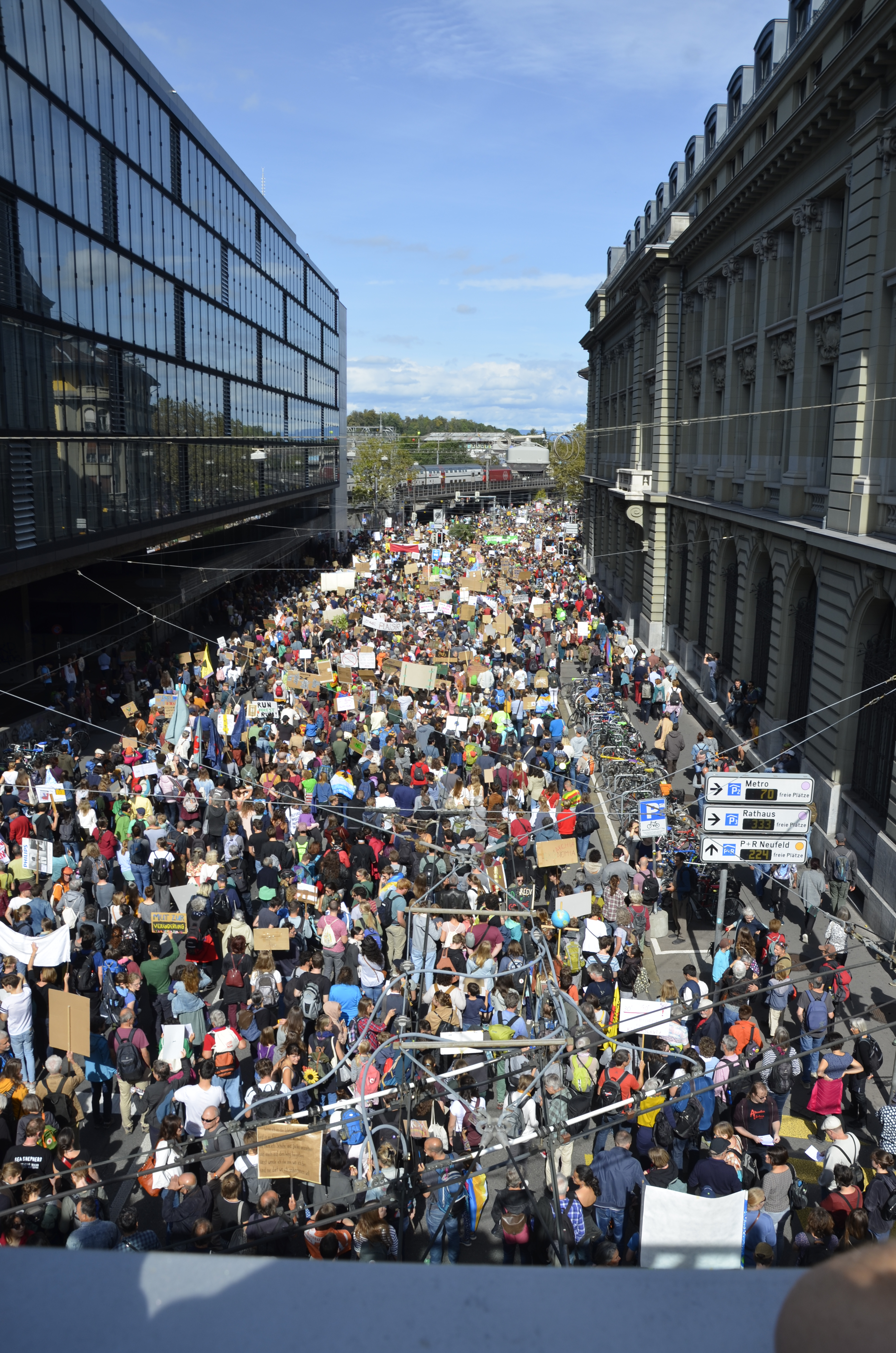
National demonstration for climate action, Bern, 2019

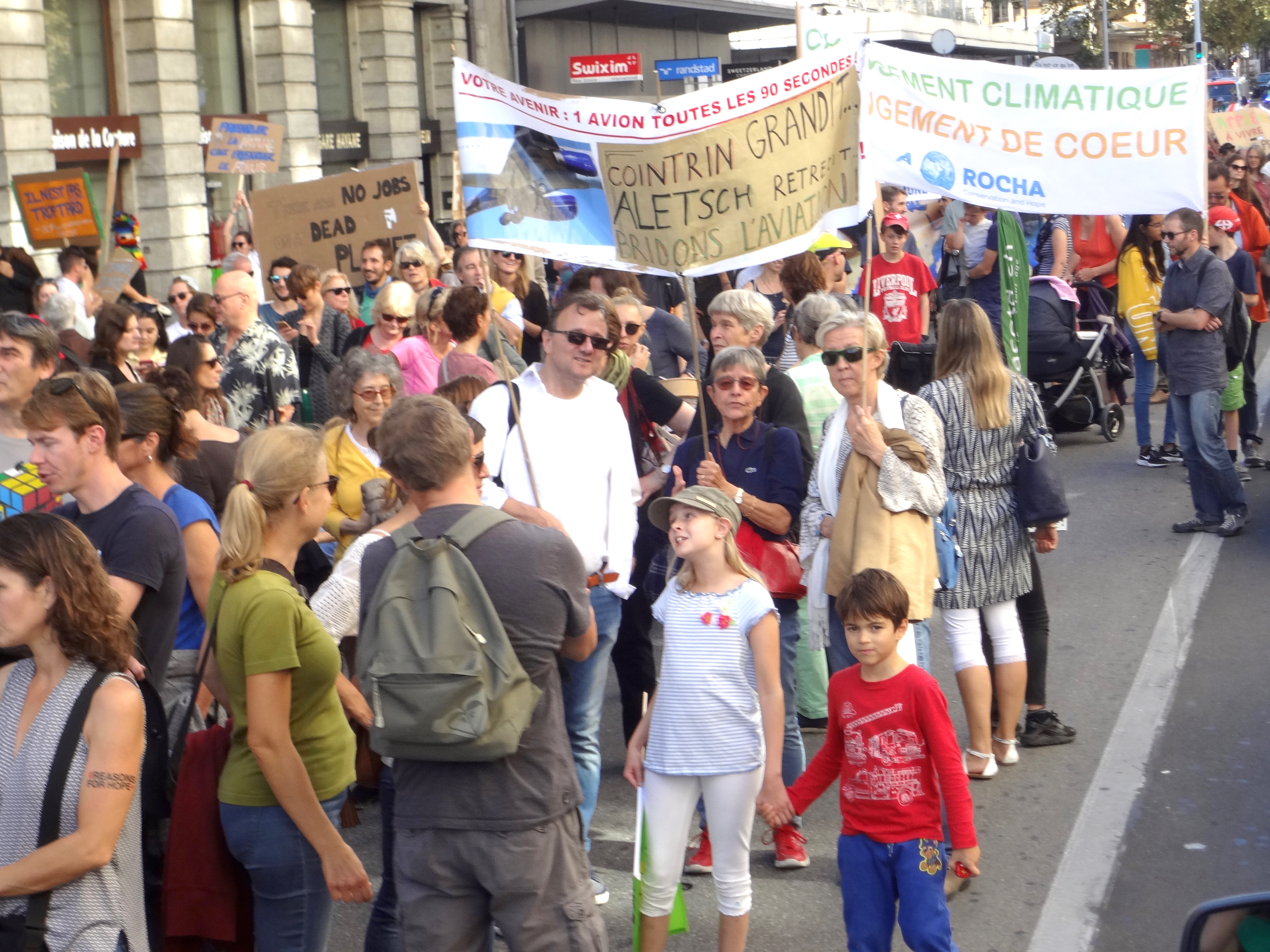
Climate March, Geneva, 2018

The environmental movement in Switzerland is represented by a wide range of associations (non-governmental organisations).

The article also present green politics and environmental policies of Switzerland.

== Organisations ==
Organisations exist and act on local, cantonal, federal and international scales. Environmental non-governmental organisations vary widely in political views and in the way they seek to influence environmental behaviours and policies.

=== Governmental ===
- Federal Office for the Environment (since 1971)

=== Non-governmental ===
- Pro Natura (since 1909, Swiss section of Friends of the Earth since 1995) – the oldest
- Swiss Association for the Protection of Birds (since 1922, Swiss section of BirdLife International)
- Swiss section of the World Wide Fund for Nature (WWF Switzerland, since 1961) – the largest number of members
- Public Eye (Berne Declaration) (since 1968)
- Ecology and Population (since 1971)
- Franz Weber Foundation (since 1977)
- Swiss Association for Transport and Environment (since 1979)
- Bio Suisse (since 1981)
- Pro Specie Rara (since 1982)
- Swiss section of Greenpeace (since 1984)
- Alternative Bank Schweiz (since 1990)
- Bruno Manser Foundation (since 1992)
- Swiss section of Green Cross International (since 1994)
- Summit Foundation (since 2001)
- Myclimate Foundation (since 2002)
- Swiss Climate Alliance (coalition of 66 organisations, since 2004)
  - Category:Swiss Climate Alliance
- Grandparents for Climate (since 2014)
- Swiss Youth for Climate (since 2015)
- Swiss Association for the Protection of Climate (since 2018)
- Lawyers for Climate (since 2022)

=== Political parties ===
- Green Party of Switzerland (since 1983)
- Green Liberal Party of Switzerland (since 2007)

=== Other social movements ===
- BreakFree [from fossil fuels] Switzerland (since 2016)
- Climate Strike Switzerland (since 2018)
- Extinction Rebellion Switzerland (since 2018)

== Legislative policies for environment ==
=== Legislation ===
In 1874, an article to protect forests was introduced in the Swiss Federal Constitution. In 1962, a constitutional article was introduced for the protection of nature.

In 1967, the Federal Act on the Protection of Nature and Cultural Heritage introduced notably the right of appeal of environmental organizations ("entitlement to appeal", article 12) which gives all Swiss organizations concerned with nature protection the right to raise general objections or to file appeals against some projects. The right of environmental organizations to appeal was later also included in the Federal Act on the Protection of the Environment (1985, article 55) and the Federal Act on Non-Human Gene Technology (2004, article 28).

In 1971, a constitutional article for the protection of the environment was approved by 92.7 per cent of voters (article 24, currently article 74 of the constitution of 1999) and the Federal Office for the Environment, Forests and Landscape (renamed Federal Office for the Environment in 2006) was founded (as part of the Department of Transport, Communications and Energy).

The Federal Inventory of Landscapes and Natural Monuments was introduced in 1977.

On 21 May 2017, 58 per cent of Swiss voters accepted the new Energy Act establishing the energy strategy 2050 (energy transition) and forbidding the construction of new nuclear power plants.

==== Popular initiatives ====
Several federal popular initiative were launched to increase environmental protection. Several of them were accepted:

- Federal popular initiative "for the protection of marsh" ("Rothenthurm initiative"), accepted by 57.8 per cent of voters on 6 December 1987. For the protection of wetlands.
- Federal popular initiative "stop the construction of nuclear power plants (moratorium)", accepted by 54.5 per cent of voters on 23 September 1990. For a ten-year moratorium on the construction of new nuclear plants.
- Federal popular initiative "for the protection of alpine areas against transit traffic" ("Alps initiative"), accepted by 51.9 per cent of voters on 20 February 1994. To protect the Alpine environment from the negative impact of traffic (see also Gotthard Base Tunnel).
- Federal popular initiative "for food produced without genetic engineering", accepted by 55.7 per cent of voters on 27 November 2005. For a moratorium on the culture of genetically modified organisms.
- Federal popular initiative "to end the invasive construction of second homes" ("Franz Weber initiative"), accepted by 50.6 per cent of voters on 12 March 2012. To reduce urban sprawl by limiting the number of second homes (with a quota of twenty per cent per commune).

== See also ==
- 2000-watt society
- Agriculture in Switzerland
- Anti-nuclear movement in Switzerland
- Bio Suisse
- Energy in Switzerland
- Nature parks in Switzerland
- Phase-out of lightweight plastic bags (Switzerland)
- Sandoz chemical spill
- Waste management in Switzerland
- CO2 Act (Switzerland)

== Sources ==
- (in French) Peter Knoepfel, Stéphane Nahrath, Jérôme Savary and Frédéric Varone, Analyse des politiques suisses de l’environnement, 2010 (ISBN 9783725309177).
- (in French) René Longet, Planète, sauvetage en cours, third edition, collection « Le savoir suisse », Presses polytechniques et universitaires romandes, 2016 (ISBN 9782889151875).
- (in French) Philippe Roch, "Écologie en Suisse (histoire)", in Dominique Bourg and Alain Papaux, Dictionnaire de la pensée écologique, 2015 (ISBN 9782130586968).
