= Anti-nuclear movement in Switzerland =

In 2008, nuclear energy provided Switzerland with 40 percent of its electricity, but a survey of Swiss people found that only seven percent of respondents were totally in favor of energy production by nuclear power stations. Many large anti-nuclear demonstrations and protests have occurred over the years.

In May 2011, following the Fukushima Daiichi nuclear disaster, Cabinet decided to ban the building of new nuclear power reactors. The country's five existing reactors would be allowed to continue operating, but "would not be replaced at the end of their life span".

== Early years ==
The Swiss parliament promulgated the Nuclear Energy Act of 1959, and the first three nuclear power plants entered production between 1969 and 1972 without significant anti-nuclear mobilization. Protests started in the late 1960s, principally against a planned nuclear power plant in Kaiseraugst, a small village not far from the city of Basel. This site was to be the focal point of the Swiss anti-nuclear movement for the next two decades.

A major occupation took place in 1975 in Kaiseraugst, after construction work had begun. The occupation was organized by the Non-violent Action Kaiseraugst and lasted about ten weeks, between April and June 1975. Fifteen thousand people participated. Following this, a number of other non-violent actions were formed nationwide, and mass demonstrations became national in scope. A demonstration held in Bern on 26 April 1975, attracted 18,000 people and was supported by more than 170 associations and parties. A period of intense mobilization occurred in the period from 1975 to 1981.

== After Chernobyl ==
From 1986 to 1990, the Chernobyl disaster brought another peak of anti-nuclear protests in Switzerland, which "increased public awareness toward nuclear energy and favored the acceptance in 1990 of a federal popular initiative for a ten-year moratorium on the construction of new nuclear plants" (by 54.5 percent of voters, on 23 September 1990). With the exception of this ten-year moratorium, the Swiss public has rejected every referendum to ban nuclear energy since the 1970s (for instance in 1984 and 2003).

Between 1979 and 2014, out of the 16 cantonal and federal votes on nuclear energy, 9 were favourable to nuclear energy and 7 were opposed to it (one moratorium accepted and six radioactive waste storage projects rejected).

== Recent developments ==
In 2008, nuclear energy provided Switzerland with 40 percent of its electricity. A survey of 1,026 Swiss people found that 7% were totally in favor of nuclear energy production, 14% were fully opposed, 33% were fairly in favor, and 38% were fairly opposed, with 8% having no opinion.

One of the most contentious issues is the disposal of radioactive waste. At present, spent nuclear material is "kept in temporary aboveground facilities while politicians and communities wrangle about where to bury it."

In May 2011, following the Fukushima nuclear disaster, some 20,000 people turned out for Switzerland's largest anti-nuclear power demonstration in 25 years. Demonstrators marched peacefully near the Beznau Nuclear Power Plant, the oldest in Switzerland, which started operating in 1969. Days after the anti-nuclear rally, Cabinet decided to ban the building of new nuclear power reactors. The country's five existing reactors would be allowed to continue operating, but "would not be replaced at the end of their life span".

On 27 November 2016, a referendum by the Green Party was held that would have limited the lifespan of Switzerland's nuclear plants to 45 years, and in doing so, would close the three oldest reactors in 2017: Beznau 1, Beznau 2, and Muehleberg. The referendum failed, with 54.2% of voters rejecting it.

On 21 May 2017, 58 percent of Swiss voters accepted the new Energy Act establishing the energy strategy 2050 and forbidding the construction of new nuclear power plants.

== See also ==
- Environmental movement in Switzerland
- Nuclear power in Switzerland
