= 1998 Swiss referendums =

Ten referendums were held in Switzerland during 1998. The first three were held on 7 June on a federal resolution on a balanced budget and two popular initiatives "for the protection of life and environment against genetic engineering (Gene-protection initiative)" and "Switzerland without secret police". Whilst the balanced budget proposal was approved, both popular initiatives were rejected by voters. The next three referendums were held on 27 September on a federal law on truck tolls based on engine size (following the approval of a federal resolution on the matter in a 1994) and two popular initiatives "for well-priced foodstuffs and ecological farms" and "10th revision of the Aged and Bereaved Insurance without raising the retirement age". Whilst the toll law was approved, both initiatives were rejected.

The final set of referendums was held on 29 November on an amendment to the federal law on labour in trade and industry, two federal resolutions on building and financing public transport infrastructure and for a temporary article in the Swiss Federal Constitution on grain, as well as a popular initiative "for a prudential drug policy". All were approved except the popular initiative.

== Results ==
Month	Question	For		Against		Blank/invalid		Total	Registered voters	Turnout	Cantons for		Cantons against	
Month	Question	Votes	%	Votes	%	Blank	Invalid	Total	Registered voters	Turnout	Full	Half	Full	Half
June	Balanced budget	1,280,329	70.7	530,486	29.3	76,513	7,105	1,894,433	4,629,496	40.9	20	6	0	0
June	Popular initiative on genetic engineering	624,964	33.3	1,252,302	66.7	26,169	6,599	1,913,034	4,629,496	41.3	0	0	20	6
June	Popular initiative on secret police	451,089	24.6	1,383,055	75.4	56,644	6,836	1,897,624	4,629,496	41.0	0	0	20	6
September	Federal law on truck tolls	1,355,735	57.2	1,014,370	42.8	26,674	7,481	2,402,260	4,636,259	51.8				
September	Popular initiative on foodstuffs and farms	535,436	23.0	1,794,024	77.0	54,518	7,680	2,391,658	4,636,259	51.6	0	0	20	6
September	Popular initiative on the retirement age	973,966	41.5	1,374,139	58.5	38,203	7,716	2,394,024	4,636,259	51.6	5	0	15	6
November	Public transport funding	1,104,294	63.5	634,714	36.5	32,150	5,865	1,777,023	4,638,920	38.3	19	3	1	3
November	Constitutional article on grain	1,318,585	79.4	341,473	20.6	96,537	7,325	1,763,920	4,638,920	38.0	20	6	0	0
November	Amendment to the federal labour law	1,072,978	63.4	620,011	36.6	68,253	6,452	1,767,694	4,638,920	38.1				
November	Popular initiative on drugs policy	453,451	26.0	1,290,070	74.0	30,286	5,890	1,779,697	4,638,920	38.4	0	0	20	6
Source: Nohlen & Stöver

== See also ==
- 1998 Swiss gene-protection initiative
