= 2003 Swiss referendums =

Eleven referendums were held in Switzerland during 2003. The first two were held on 9 February on federal resolutions on reforming the referendum process and changing the cantonal contribution to financing hospital medication. Both were approved. The last nine were all held on 18 May on two federal laws on the Swiss army and civil defence, and seven popular initiatives; "yes to fair rents", "for one Sunday a season free from motor vehicles–a test for four years", "health has to be affordable", "equal rights for the disabled", "electricity without nuclear power", "for prolonging the ban on new nuclear power stations" and "for a sufficient provision of vocational education". Whilst the two laws were approved, all nine initiatives were rejected by voters.

== Results ==
Month	Question	For		Against		Blank/invalid		Total	Registered voters	Turnout	Cantons for		Cantons against	
Month	Question	Votes	%	Votes	%	Blank	Invalid	Total	Registered voters	Turnout	Full	Half	Full	Half
February	Referendum process	934,005	70.4	393,638	29.6	31,216	6,658	1,365,517	4,755,703	28.7	20	6	0	0
February	Cantonal contribution to hospital medicine	1,028,673	77.4	301,128	22.6	28,735	6,818	1,365,354	4,755,703	28.7				
May	Federal law on the army	1,718,452	76.0	541,577	24.0	90,232	11,121	2,361,382	4,764,659	49.6				
May	Federal law on civil defence	1,829,339	80.6	441,498	19.4	77,179	10,861	2,358,877	4,764,659	49.5				
May	"Yes to fair rents"	749,388	32.7	1,540,401	67.3	61,997	10,731	2,362,517	4,764,659	49.6	1	0	19	6
May	Motor vehicle-free Sundays	881,953	37.6	1,460,794	62.4	20,247	10,193	2,373,187	4,764,659	49.8	0	0	20	6
May	"Health has to be affordable"	625,073	27.1	1,682,694	72.9	48,813	10,577	2,367,157	4,764,659	49.7	0	0	20	6
May	"Equal rights for the disabled"	870,249	37.7	1,439,893	62.3	47,178	10,563	2,367,883	4,764,659	49.7	3	0	17	6
May	"Electricity without nuclear power"	783,586	33.7	1,540,566	66.3	34,412	10,538	2,369,102	4,764,659	49.7	0	1	20	5
May	Ban on new nuclear power plants	955,624	41.6	1,341,673	58.4	54,914	10,864	2,363,075	4,764,659	49.6	0	2	20	4
May	Provision of vocational education	722,931	31.6	1,564,325	68.4	63,596	10,731	2,361,583	4,764,659	49.6	0	0	20	6
Source: Nohlen & Stöver

== See also ==
- Anti-nuclear movement in Switzerland
