= Franz Weber (activist) =

Swiss activist (1927–2019)

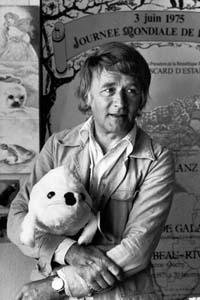
- Franz Weber in the 1970s
- Born: 27 July 1927; Basel, Switzerland
- Died: 2 April 2019 (aged 91); Bern, Switzerland
- Education: University of Paris
- Occupations: Environmentalist; Animal rights activist
- Organization: Franz Weber Foundation
- Awards: See list

Franz Weber (27 July 1927 – 2 April 2019) was a Swiss environmentalist and animal welfare activist.

== Life ==
Franz Weber began his career as a journalist and reporter. After his studies of philosophy and linguistics at the Sorbonne University in Paris, he worked from his Paris office from 1951 until 1973.

Weber became actively interested in ecology and conservation in 1965, when he learned about efforts to conserve the Swiss mountain region, the Engadine Valley of the Lakes. Weber decided to invest himself in the rescue and safeguarding of this region by beginning an international press campaign. At the end of a seven years battle by Weber the Swiss Federal Government declared the Engadine Valley of the Lakes a "National Conservation Region" and put it under the State's protection. In order to be able to launch further campaigns, he quit writing for money and devoted himself entirely to the conservation of natural sites of special beauty and value in France, Germany, Austria, Italy, Greece, Switzerland, Slovenia and Hungary, as well as endangered species in South America, Canada, Australia, Africa and Europe.

He founded the Franz Weber Foundation in 1975. The board is composed of 5 international personalities with Weber as president. The Foundation has today over 230,000 supporter members.

In 1997, in the presence of Émile Gardaz, Jean-Pierre Thiollet and some other personalities, the township of Delphi appointed him a Citoyen d'honneur.

In 2014, Weber announced his retirement from the foundation, with his daughter Vera to succeed him in running it.

Weber was married to Judith with one daughter, Vera, and lived in Montreux, Switzerland. He died on 2 April 2019 in Bern at the age of 91.

== Campaigns ==
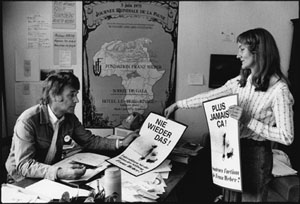

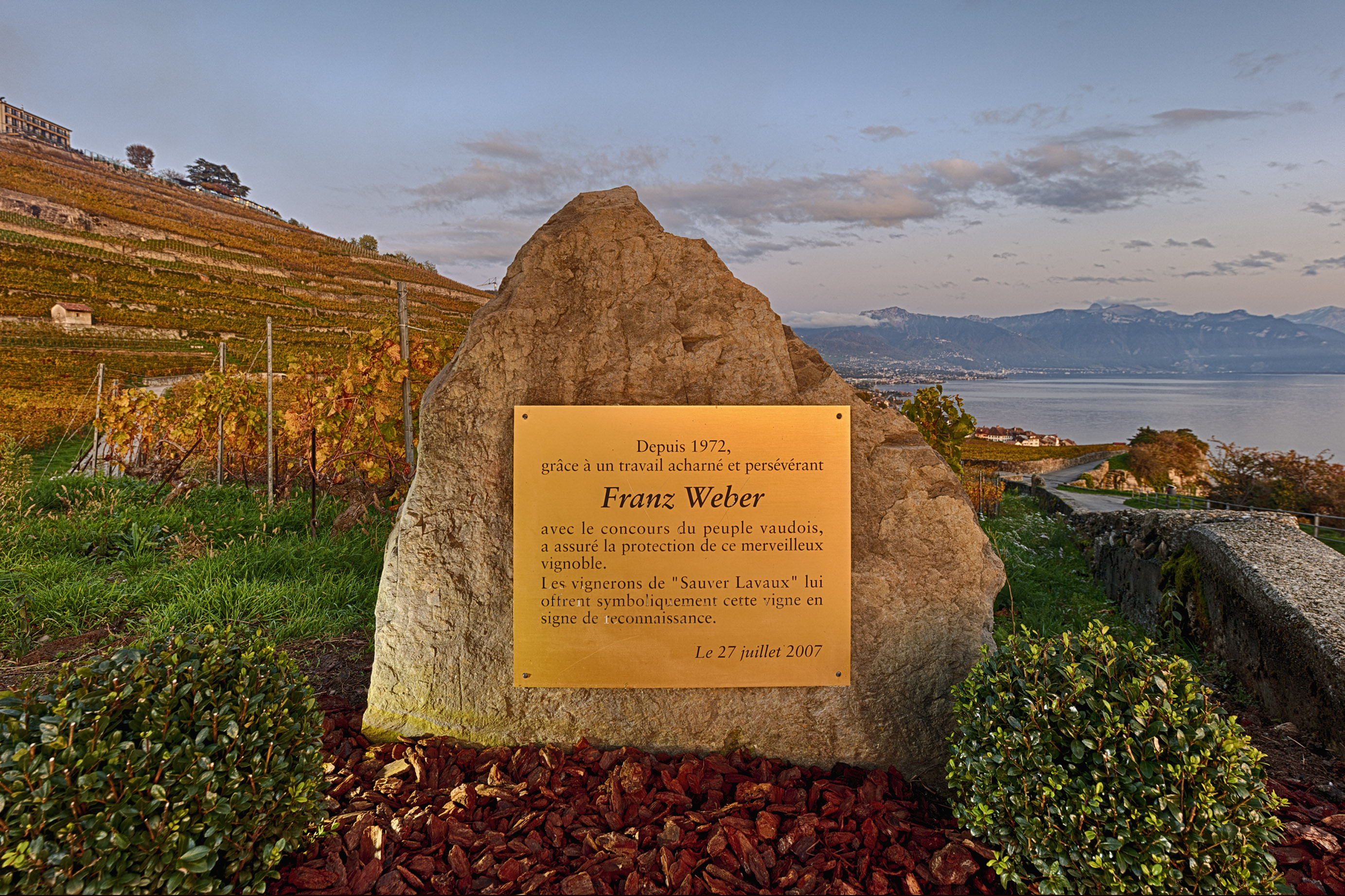
Puidoux, en Lavaux, commemorative plaque on the way Chemin de la Dame

In the 1970s and 2000s, Franz Weber launched three cantonal popular initiatives for the complete protection of the Lavaux region and two of them directly succeeded. In 2007 the vineyard landscape of Lavaux was registered as a World Heritage Site by UNESCO. One of the Foundation's first international campaigns in defence of animals was the fight against the yearly slaughters of seals on the coast of Labrador in Canada, The campaign, which started in 1976, included a trip with French film actress Brigitte Bardot and 75 newspaper reporters to the Labrador seal hunting grounds. In 1983 the European Economic Community banned all importations of baby seal pelts into the EEC.

In 1978, the Council of Europe in Strasbourg appealed to Franz Weber to save ancient Delphi in Greece from destruction by an American-Greek project of industrialization. Weber created the successful international movement, "Save Delphi" and within only a few months stopped the project. When, in 1986, Delphi is again threatened by industrialization "Save Delphi" was successfully revived. In 1997, in recognition of his merits and campaigns, the town of Delphi named Weber Honorary Citizen and Protector of Delphi.

In 1983, Weber battled against the destruction of the alluvial forests of the Danube between Hainburg and Vienna in Austria to build a hydro-electrical complex. His Foundation invited 40 European journalists to Vienna and to draw international attention to the project. On Christmas 1984 the Austrian government stopped the project and in 1995 Chancellor Franz Vranitzki decides to "offer the water forest region of the Danube to the coming generations as the first Austrian National Park".

Also in 1983, parallel to the Danube campaign, Weber saved the turn-of-the century Grandhotel Giessbach on Lake Brienz near Interlaken from destruction by raising the funds to purchase the property. He then entrusted it to the Swiss People as a place of culture, of meeting and of rejuvenation.

In 2008, a referendum initiated by Weber to end Swiss Air Force training flights over "tourist areas" (virtually the entire country) to reduce the "impact of noise pollution", was soundly defeated by a vote of 68.1%. Weber, who referred to the Air Force's newest jet fighter, the F/A-18 Hornet, as "oversized, ineffective, and ruinous to our country", proposed the use of simulators to replace air operations.

On 12 March 2012, the "Franz Weber initiative" was accepted by 50.6 per cent of voters. It aims to reduce urban sprawl by limiting the number of second homes (with a quota of twenty per cent per commune).

Also in 2012, the Franz Weber Foundation launched an international campaign against bullfighting. The campaign is called "Childhood without violence", and focuses on the Latinamerican countries that allow bullfights, and in particular draws attention to the effects on minors of witnessing bullfighting.

== Franz Weber Parks ==
In 1989, the Franz Weber Foundation purchased Bonrook Station, a former cattle station near Pine Creek, Northern Territory, which it has since developed into a sanctuary for brumbies and native wild life. Backpackers worked on the sanctuary improving the grounds for food and board. The grounds have now sadly been unmaintained for quite a few years as funding was cut and now is kept in order by only a couple workers. Tours and dinners are no longer held there. In 1990, the Togolese Government approached Weber with an appeal to save Togo's last elephants. A convention was signed which placed the National Park of Fazao-Malfakassa into the care of the Franz Weber Foundation.

== Prizes and honours ==
- In 1974, the State of Texas and the City of Austin made Weber Honorary Citizen for his merits in conservation and in preservation of the environment.
- In 1978, he received the German Prize for Conservation of Nature
- In 1979, he was awarded the German Medal of Environment
- In 1981, Count Bernadette of Sweden honoured him with the European Prize for Land Conservation
- In 1986, he received the Hans Adalbert Schweigart Medal from the World Union for Protection of Life
- In 1997, he was Citoyen d'Honneur of Delphi
- In 2004, he was awarded the Order of Saint Sava (the highest award presented by the Serbian Orthodox Church)
- In 2007, he received the Swiss "Tierweltpreis" for his lifetime work in favour of the animals.
- In 2010, Franz Weber was named an honorary member of Pro Natura (Switzerland)

== Books ==
- by Franz Weber:

- "Des Montagnes à soulever" (1976, Jean Jacques Pauvert, Paris)
- "Die gerettete Landschaft" (1987, Fischer-TB.-Vlg., Ffm, ISBN 978-3-596-24025-8)
- "Paradis sauvé", (1988, Favre, ISBN 978-2-8289-0244-5)
- "Das gerettete Paradies" (1986, Nymphenburger Verlag, Munich, ISBN 978-3-485-00521-0).

- about Franz Weber :

- René Langel, "Franz Weber — L'homme aux victoires de l'impossible" (Favre, ISBN 2-8289-0787-2); "Franz Weber, Rebell für die Natur" (2004, Herbig, ISBN 978-3-7766-2325-3)
- "Franz Weber", in Jean-Pierre Thiollet, Hallier, Edernellement vôtre, 2019, p. 301-305, ISBN 978-2-35055-273-6

== See also ==
- Environmental movement in Switzerland
- United Animal Nations
