= 1998 Swiss gene-protection initiative =

The Swiss gene-protection initiative of 1998, also known as the Gene-Protection Initiative (German: Genschutzinitiativ) was a Swiss federal popular initiative that aimed to ban the patenting of transgenic organisms and all scientific research using transgenic animals. It was rejected in a constitutional referendum in 1998.

== Background ==
The initiative followed a successful, less controversial initiative (the Beobachter Initiative) in 1992, which placed stricter control on biotechnology in human reproductive medicine. The referendum was defeated with 1,250,000 (66.7%) against, and 625000 (33.3%) in favour; the turnout was 41%. The initiative was strongly opposed by Swiss scientists and pharmaceutical companies. In May 1998, 3,000 opponents of the initiative, including scientists and others, attended a protest march in Zurich. Four of Switzerland's five Nobel laureates held a press conference to express their opposition to the referendum. According to Heidi Diggelmann, head of the Swiss National Science Foundation's Research Council, "Scientists made a difference in this campaign by getting out of their labs and establishing a dialogue with the Swiss people. We now want to continue improving that relationship between Swiss science and society". Jakob Nuesch, former president of the Federal Institute of Technology, said that a yes vote would have put the research base of Switzerland under threat, and that: "research in plant genetics, including the modern seed industry, could be killed off". Prior to the vote, the Swiss government tried to strengthen the pre-existing rules on genetic engineering in an attempt to pre-empt the vote.

The beginnings of the movement to have a referendum on the issue were in autumn 1994, when a working group was set up which started to collect signatures for an initiative. 17 months later, over 110,000 signatures were collected, exceeding the requirement that 100,000 signatures must be collected within 18 months for an initiative to be valid. The initiative was supported by a number of organizations, including Physicians Against Animal Experimentation, Greenpeace Switzerland, and the World Wildlife Fund Switzerland. The referendum was scheduled for June 6 and 7, 1998, and campaigning started in 1996. Early in 1996, an opinion poll was conducted on the public's support for gene technology, of those who expressed an opinion, over 70% rejected the technology.

== Campaign ==
In April 1996, on the 10th anniversary of the Chernobyl disaster, the campaign in favour of the initiative ran newspaper advertisements comparing nuclear technology with gene technology. According to Gottfried Schatz, scientists participating in television debates "often left a poor image because they participated without sufficient preparation". Pharmaceutical companies established GenSuisse, a public opinion group which ran poster advertisements against the initiative, including posters that displayed sick children. Newspapers based in Basel, which is the centre of the biomedical research community, opposed the initiative, with some other media, according to Schatz: "pandered openly to public fears, sometimes stooping to grotesque distortions".

While the 1996 poll revealed strong opposition to gene technology, another poll published two years later revealed that almost half of Swiss citizens still opposed gene technology, the majority of those who expressed an opinion. The alarm caused by these figures resulted in demonstrations in several Swiss cities by scientists and physicians on 28 April 1998. The dispute between proponents and opponents of the initiative became bitter in the month leading up to the referendum. On the days leading up to voting day, there was a sudden shift in public opinion in opposition to the initiative.

== Result ==
In order for the initiative to be passed into the constitution, the majority of the voters, and the majority of cantons would have to support it. In the event, 66.67% of voters opposed the initiative, and not one canton supported it. While no canton supported the initiative, there was a disparity between French-speaking cantons and German-speaking ones. There was also a disparity between male and female voters, with men being more likely to oppose the initiative.
