= United Animal Nations =

International animal rights organization

United Animal Nations is an animal rights organization founded in 1979, in Geneva, by the Franz Weber Foundation, based in Switzerland.

== History ==
UAN logo

United Animal Nations was founded by Franz Weber on 8 November 1979 in Geneva, Switzerland.

== Purpose ==
The purpose of the UAN is to obtain legal status for animal populations as well as to enhance the impact and political weight of the UAN member organizations. The forum was initiated by the Swiss environmentalist and animal activist Franz Weber. The charter and declaration was deliberately designed to mirror that of the United Nations. The members are established organizations and institutions, whose aims are the protection of animal life and the preservation of nature. Weber complemented the structure of the UN by adding a protection committee and the International Court of Animal Rights to the UAN. The Statutes, Charter and Declaration were put together with Swiss philosopher and author Denis de Rougemont from Ferney-Voltaire, and a lawyer from Zürich, Anton Flachsmann. On 8 November 1979, Franz Weber presented them to the international press.

== Court ==
The UAN's most important organ, The International Court of Justice for Animal Rights has its seat in Geneva. Its duties are to bring to the notice of the public, by means of morally symbolic prosecutions, cruel human actions against the animal kingdom that cannot be legally dealt with under normal human rights legislature. The court publicly announces its verdict, if need be by naming ministers and government leaders. The court has a president, two presidential assistants, and six to twelve further members representing the partaking animal protection associations. Only established bodies can act as plaintiffs. Since its foundation in 1979 the court has proceeded in more than 25 international cases.

=== Trials ===
As of 2011, the Journal Franz Weber listed twenty international trials in 34 years, including:

- February 2010: Whale and dolphin slaughter throughout Japan, Norway, Iceland, Greenland and the Faroe Islands - Geneva
- June 2008: Bullfighting in Spain, Portugal and France (earlier trial had also taken place in Brussels, in 2003, and specifically re Spain in 1982) - Geneva
- December 2005: Seal massacre in Canada (III) (previous trials in 1982 & 1979) - Geneva
- March 2002: Inhumane treatment of animals for slaughter in Europe (II) - Geneva
- May 2001: Persecution and killing of certain dog breeds in Germany - Geneva
- February 1999: Massacre of migratory birds in Europe (trial regarding Bird massacre in Italy, 1985) - Geneva
- March 1995: Transport of animals for slaughter in Europe (II) (first trial in 1993) - Geneva
- December 1991: Massacre of dolphins and drift net fishing - Geneva
- October 1989: Ivory trade and elephant massacre (II) (also Elephant massacre in Africa trial 1984) - Geneva
- February 1988: Wild horse massacre in Australia (II) (first trial in 1987) - Geneva
- March 1981: Transport of horses in Germany - Geneva
- February 1980: Animal testing and vivisection - Strasbourg

== Founding board members ==
- Catherine Aga Khan
- Katharina Büttiker
- Belton P. Mouras (founder and president of the Animal Protection Institute of America, California)
- René Langel
- Robert Hantzberg
- Anton Flachsmann
- Gilles Stickel
- Judith Weber
- Franz Weber (Secretary-General)
