= 1984 Swiss referendums =

Ten referendums were held in Switzerland in 1984. The first three were held on 26 February on introducing tolls for HGVs (approved), introducing tolls for national routes (approved) and a popular initiative "for a real civilian service based on a proof through demonstration" (rejected). The next two were held on 20 May on popular initiatives "against the abuse of bank client confidentiality and bank power" (rejected) and "against the sellout of the homeland" (rejected).

Two further referendums were held on 23 September on popular initiatives "for a future without further nuclear power plants" (rejected) and "for a secure, parsimonious and ecologically sound energy supply" (rejected). The final three were held on 2 December on a popular initiative "for an effective protection of maternity" (rejected), a federal resolution on an article in the Swiss Federal Constitution relating to broadcasting (approved) and a popular initiative "for the compensation of victims of violent crimes" (approved).

== Results ==
=== February: HGV tolls ===
Choice	Popular vote		Cantons		
Choice	Votes	%	Full	Half	Total
For	1,254,489	58.7	13	5	15.5
Against	882,756	41.3	7	1	7.5
Blank votes	17,124	–	–	–	–
Invalid votes	2,223	–	–	–	–
Total	2,156,592	100	20	6	23
Registered voters/turnout	4,087,215	52.8	–	–	–
Source: Nohlen & Stöver

=== February: Tolls on national routes ===
Choice	Popular vote		Cantons		
Choice	Votes	%	Full	Half	Total
For	1,132,497	53.0	13	6	16
Against	1,005,051	47.0	7	0	7
Blank votes	17,706	–	–	–	–
Invalid votes	2,202	–	–	–	–
Total	2,157,456	100	20	6	23
Registered voters/turnout	4,087,215	52.8	–	–	–
Source: Nohlen & Stöver

=== February: Civilian service ===
Choice	Popular vote		Cantons		
Choice	Votes	%	Full	Half	Total
For	771,413	36.2	1	1	1.5
Against	1,361,482	63.8	19	5	21.5
Blank votes	20,212	–	–	–	–
Invalid votes	1,502	–	–	–	–
Total	1,712,397	100	20	6	23
Registered voters/turnout	4,114,658	41.6	–	–	–
Source: Nohlen & Stöver

=== May: Banks ===
Choice	Popular vote		Cantons		
Choice	Votes	%	Full	Half	Total
For	464,637	27.0	0	0	0
Against	1,258,964	73.0	20	6	23
Blank votes	16,954	–	–	–	–
Invalid votes	1,796	–	–	–	–
Total	1,742,351	100	20	6	23
Registered voters/turnout	4,097,762	42.5	–	–	–
Source: Nohlen & Stöver

=== May: Sellout of the homeland ===
Choice	Popular vote		Cantons		
Choice	Votes	%	Full	Half	Total
For	837,997	48.9	7	3	8.5
Against	874,954	51.1	13	3	14.5
Blank votes	25,824	–	–	–	–
Invalid votes	1,961	–	–	–	–
Total	1,740,736	100	20	6	23
Registered voters/turnout	4,097,762	42.5	–	–	–
Source: Nohlen & Stöver

=== September: Nuclear power plants ===
Choice	Popular vote		Cantons		
Choice	Votes	%	Full	Half	Total
For	762,792	45.0	5	2	6
Against	931,245	55.0	20	6	23
Blank votes	17,992	–	–	–	–
Invalid votes	1,448	–	–	–	–
Total	1,713,477	100	20	6	23
Registered voters/turnout	4,114,658	41.6	–	–	–
Source: Nohlen & Stöver

=== September: Energy supply ===
Choice	Popular vote		Cantons		
Choice	Votes	%	Full	Half	Total
For	773,767	45.8	5	2	6
Against	916,916	54.2	15	4	17
Blank votes	20,212	–	–	–	–
Invalid votes	1,502	–	–	–	–
Total	1,712,397	100	20	6	23
Registered voters/turnout	4,114,658	41.6	–	–	–
Source: Nohlen & Stöver

=== December: Maternity protection ===
Choice	Popular vote		Cantons		
Choice	Votes	%	Full	Half	Total
For	241,442	15.8	0	0	0
Against	1,288,974	84.2	20	6	23
Blank votes	19,166	–	–	–	–
Invalid votes	2,428	–	–	–	–
Total	1,552,010	100	20	6	23
Registered voters/turnout	4,123,190	37.6	–	–	–
Source: Nohlen & Stöver

=== December: Constitutional article on broadcasting ===
Choice	Popular vote		Cantons		
Choice	Votes	%	Full	Half	Total
For	1,001,888	68.7	20	6	23
Against	455,536	31.3	0	0	0
Blank votes	86,784	–	–	–	–
Invalid votes	3,534	–	–	–	–
Total	1,547,742	100	20	6	23
Registered voters/turnout	4,123,190	37.5	–	–	–
Source: Nohlen & Stöver

=== December: Victims of violent crime ===
Choice	Popular vote		Cantons		
Choice	Votes	%	Full	Half	Total
For	1,241,377	82.1	20	6	23
Against	270,878	17.9	0	0	0
Blank votes	36,180	–	–	–	–
Invalid votes	2,827	–	–	–	–
Total	1,551,262	100	20	6	23
Registered voters/turnout	4,123,190	37.6	–	–	–
Source: Nohlen & Stöver
