= 1987 Swiss referendums =

Seven referendums were held in Switzerland in 1987. The first four were held on 5 April on amendments to the laws on asylum and foreign residents (both approved), a popular initiative "for the people's co-determination of military expenditure" (rejected) and a federal resolution on the voting system for popular initiatives that also have counter-proposals (approved).

The last three were held on 6 December on a federal resolution on the Rail 2000 project (approved), an amendment to the federal law on health insurance (rejected) and a popular initiative "for the protection of fens - Rothenthurm Initiative" (approved).

== Results ==
=== April: Amendment to the asylum law ===
Choice	Votes	%
For	1,180,082	67.3
Against	572,330	32.7
Blank votes	35,021	–
Invalid votes	2,659	–
Total	1,790,092	100
Registered voters/turnout	4,223,723	42.4
Source: Nohlen & Stöver

=== April: Amendment to the foreign residents law ===
Choice	Votes	%
For	1,122,027	65.7
Against	585,460	34.3
Blank votes	73,532	–
Invalid votes	2,969	–
Total	1,783,988	100
Registered voters/turnout	4,223,723	42.2
Source: Nohlen & Stöver

=== April: Military expenditure ===
Choice	Popular vote		Cantons		
Choice	Votes	%	Full	Half	Total
For	714,209	40.6	2	1	2.5
Against	1,046,637	59.4	18	5	20.5
Blank votes	28,080	–	–	–	–
Invalid votes	2,702	–	–	–	–
Total	1,791,628	100	20	6	23
Registered voters/turnout	4,223,723	42.4	–	–	–
Source: Nohlen & Stöver

=== April: Voting procedure for popular initiatives ===
Choice	Popular vote		Cantons		
Choice	Votes	%	Full	Half	Total
For	1,080,992	63.3	18	6	21
Against	627,665	36.7	2	0	2
Blank votes	72,765	–	–	–	–
Invalid votes	3,592	–	–	–	–
Total	1,785,014	100	20	6	23
Registered voters/turnout	4,223,723	42.3	–	–	–
Source: Nohlen & Stöver

=== December: Rail 2000 ===
Choice	Votes	%
For	1,140,857	57.0
Against	860,893	43.0
Blank votes	22,635	–
Invalid votes	2,889	–
Total	2,027,274	100
Registered voters/turnout	4,250,684	47.7
Source: Nohlen & Stöver

=== December: Amendment to the Health insurance law ===
Choice	Votes	%
For	571,447	28.7
Against	1,418,231	71.3
Blank votes	33,063	–
Invalid votes	3,300	–
Total	2,026,041	100
Registered voters/turnout	4,250,684	47.7
Source: Nohlen & Stöver

=== December: Fen protection (Rothenthurm initiative) ===
Choice	Popular vote		Cantons		
Choice	Votes	%	Full	Half	Total
For	1,153,448	57.8	17	6	20
Against	843,555	42.2	3	0	3
Blank votes	26,139	–	–	–	–
Invalid votes	3,188	–	–	–	–
Total	2,026,330	100	20	6	23
Registered voters/turnout	4,250,684	47.7	–	–	–
Source: Nohlen & Stöver
