= Waste management in Switzerland =

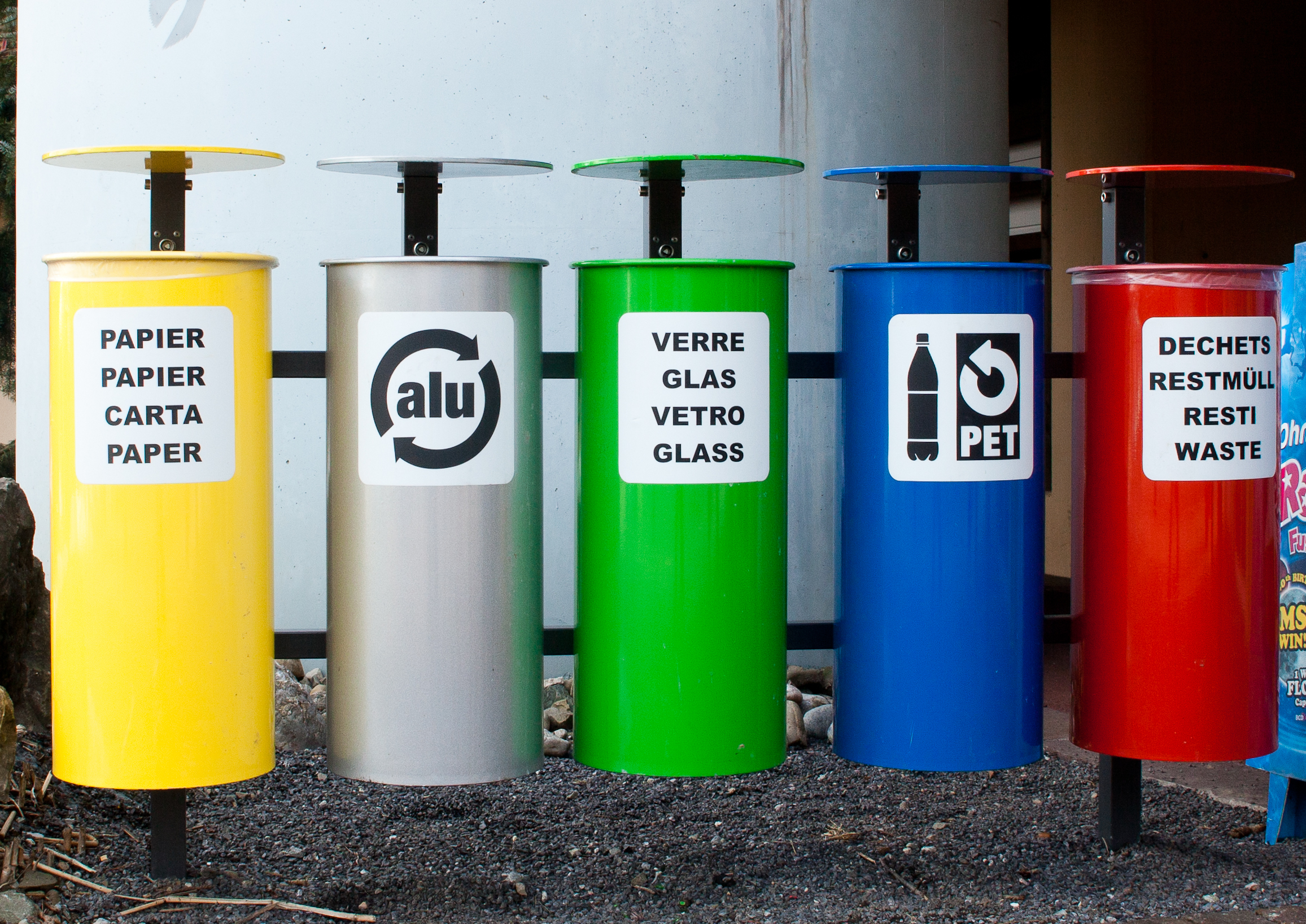
Bins to collect paper, aluminium, glass, PET bottles and incinerable waste

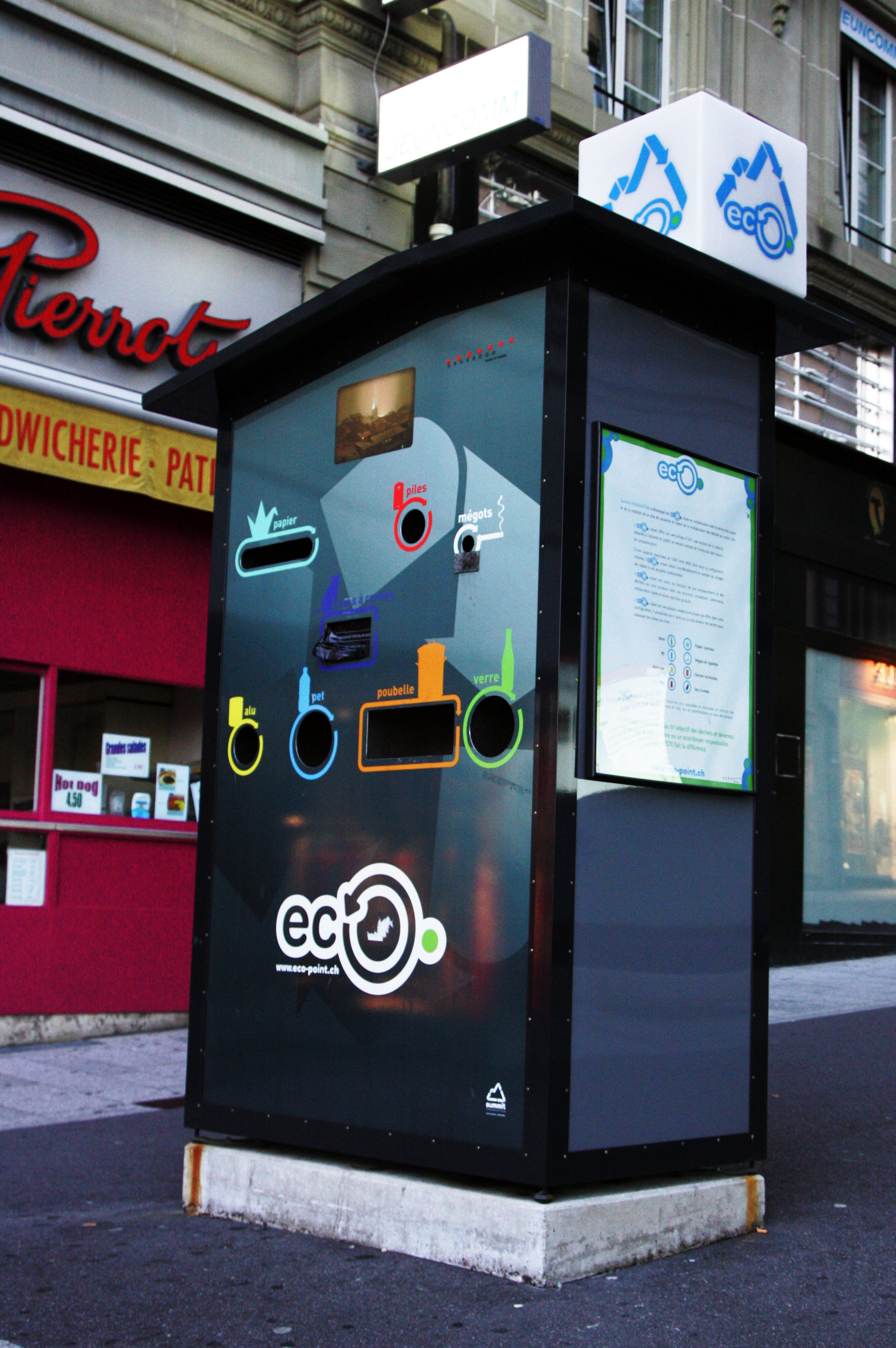
Urban recycling booth in Lausanne

The waste management in Switzerland is based on the polluter pays principle. Bin bags are taxed with pay-per-bag fees in three quarters of the communes. The recycling rate doubled in 20 years due to this strategy. The recycling rate for municipal solid waste exceeds 50 percent (with an objective of 60 percent in 2020).

However, although the recycling rate of 54 percent is above the European average of 28 percent (2015), Switzerland is among the largest waste producers in Europe (730 kg of waste per capita in 2014). In 2009, 2,801,285 tons of waste from households and small businesses was recycled and 2,680,359 tons of municipal waste was incinerated.

== Recycling ==
In Switzerland, the following common household waste materials are recycled: aluminum and tin cans, old batteries, light bulbs, glass, paper, PET bottles, textiles, electrical and electronic equipment, and others. The disposal of recyclable waste is mostly free of charge, though not always operated as door-to-door collection. Some waste must be brought to collection spots (e.g. glass, metal, textiles), some is collected in supermarkets or retail shops (e.g. batteries, PET bottles, old electrical and electronic equipment).

The seven Swiss recycling organisations: FERRO-Recycling (tin cans), IGORA (household aluminium), INOBAT (household batteries), PET-Recycling Switzerland (PET beverage bottles), the SENS Foundation (electrical and electronic equipment), TEXAID (textiles) and VetroSwiss (glass) are united in the umbrella organisation Swiss Recycling.
"This association exploits the communication synergies that exist between the individual recycling organisations by providing a common platform for disseminating information on the separate collection and appropriate recycling of materials. The association's independence and expertise make it a key contact for official bodies, politicians, retailers and schools throughout Switzerland on all issues relating to recycling."

=== Individual recycling rates ===
The recycling rates of the individual recyclable materials reached in 2006 a mean of 76% of all currently recyclable items being recycled. This has narrowly surpassed the Swiss government's 75% target, meaning that for the time being there will be no introduction of a recycling tax on glass bottles and jars, nor on clothes and textiles, plastic bottles, home-use batteries, light bulbs or paperware and card.

== Waste incineration ==
Since the introduction of landfilling ban in Switzerland on 1 January 2000, all non recycled combustible waste must be incinerated. Switzerland has 30 municipal solid waste incinerating facilities (November 2018).

== Municipal solid waste ==
According to Waste Atlas in Switzerland in 2012 5.5 million tonnes of municipal solid waste were produced (694 kg/person/year), one of the highest rates in the world.

== Household trash disposal ==
In many places in Switzerland, household rubbish disposal and collection is a paid service. Household refuse (except dangerous and cumbersome items, batteries, sofas, electrical appliances, etc.) in theory, is only to be collected if it is in bags which either have a payment sticker attached, in official bags with the surcharge paid when the bags are purchased or weighed at central collection bins. However in practice, this is difficult to enforce, for hygiene reasons and difficulty in identifying the perpetrators. However it is a financial incentive to recycle as much as possible, for recycling is usually free of charge or cheaper, albeit not always operated through a door-to-door collection. Swiss health officials and police often open up garbage for which the disposal charge has not been paid. They search for evidence such as old bills which connect the bag to the household/person they originated from. Fines for not paying the disposal fee can now be up to CHF 10,000.- in some municipalities. Again many people are now aware of this and remove their names and details from any documentation disposed of illegally before trashing it, therefore rendering it impossible and futile for health officials to identify where the rubbish is coming from. In fact in some areas the cost of the payment stickers or official rubbish sacks has fallen slightly. However, where this has occurred, an annual taxation on refuse collection has been introduced or reintroduced as it were. In some extraordinary cases, a handful of municipalities have introduced refuse weighing machines and electronic chip-cards which need to be 'topped up' with money, thus enforcing payment for refuse elimination by weight and not volume. Again causing problems for elderly residents who would have to somehow get to the nearest refuse disposal point, possibly having to walk uphill or a significant distance. All such methods are proving unpopular Switzerland-wide, especially, as said, amongst the ageing Swiss nationals who often find it difficult to come to grips with the ever-imposing technological era. Dumping refuse and household waste inappropriately or illegally incurs a heavy fine.

== Bibliography ==
- Stefano Carattini, Andrea Baranzini and Rafael Lalive, "Is taxing waste a waste of time? Evidence from a supreme court decision", London School of Economics, 2016.
