= 2012 Swiss referendums =

Twelve national referendums were held in Switzerland during 2012. On 11 March, voters across the country were asked five questions on employment leave, second houses, building society savings, the Fixed Book Price Agreement and gambling revenues. On 17 June, there were three questions on healthcare, foreign policy and home buying. On 23 September, there were three on a smoking ban, secure housing in old age and music lessons at school. A final referendum was held on 25 November on the Animal Diseases Act.

== Background ==
Swiss law says that any issue can be put to a referendum if it attains 100,000 signatures to do so. The rules further state that for a measure to be nationally adopted into the constitution it has to get a majority of both votes and the number cantons that support the issue.

== March referendums ==
The five topics of the March referendum were:

1. the federal popular initiative "six weeks of vacation for everyone;"
2. the federal popular initiative "an end to the limitless construction of second homes" with a quota of twenty percent per commune (Franz Weber initiative);
3. the federal popular initiative "for tax-supported building society savings to buy living space for self-use and to finance energy saving and environmental measures;"
4. a vote on the re-introduction of the Fixed Book Price Agreement; and
5. a vote on enshrining in the constitution that state earnings from gambling have to be used for the public interest.

Sub-national referendum topics included:

1. A proposal in Zurich to set up "sex boxes" for prostitution with special parking spaces;
2. A proposal in Geneva to tighten restrictions on unsanctioned protests and to toughen fines for violations.

=== Campaign and history ===
The issues behind each national measure were:

1. The measure was approved after Travaille Suisse got the signatures for it to be voted put to a referendum. The Swiss Employers' Association (SBA) and Economiesuisse opposed the holiday proposal on the grounds that it would not be cost effective and could lead to Switzerland losing its stature as a business destination with the consequent relocation of big business to other countries such Germany. Travaille Suisse said that increased stress in the workplace was justification enough for longer holidays than the currently mandates four weeks a year (though some industrial sectors voluntarily increase holiday leave).
2. The measure was brought by an environmental organisation amid concern that a recent construction in mountain resorts have led to natural resources wastage and inflated property prices to the detriment of locals (about 500,000 second homes in the country are 12% of total housing). The general "business community" and tourism industry opposed the proposal citing claims of a breach to local and canton autonomy under the country's federalist system. The national government also opposed the measure saying that reforms to the zoning laws since July 2011 could more effectively police overbuilding.
3. Proponents of the measure suggested cantons should have the authority to grant incentives to raise what has traditionally been a low home ownership rate.
4. The measure, which could affect about 500 publishers who produce 10,000 books a year, did not require a canton majority. Previously the re-sale price maintenance regulations were revoked in French Switzerland in the early 1990s and in 2007 in German Switzerland.
5. The measure was practically unopposed and did not stir any public discussion, as it merely elevates to constitutional status what has already been in force according to ordinary laws and concordats. Campaigning for or against it did not take place.

The issues behind each sub-national measure were:

1. Zurich's measure was introduced to keep prostitution away from suburban areas.
2. The Geneva measure was said to be pertinent as the city is host to variety of supranational organisations such as the United Nations Human Rights Council and the International Committee of the Red Cross, which protesters mostly tend to target.

=== Results ===
Question	For		Against		Invalid/ blank	Total votes	Registered voters	Turnout	Cantons for		Cantons against		Result
Question	Votes	%	Votes	%	Invalid/ blank	Total votes	Registered voters	Turnout	Full	Half	Full	Half	Result
Fixed book price agreement	966,633	43.92	1,234,222	56.08	104,384	2,305,239	5,139,055	44.86					Rejected
Gambling revenues	1,916,182	87.09	284,108	12.91	100,278	2,300,568	5,139,055	44.77	20	6	0	0	Accepted
Six weeks of vacation	771,717	33.50	1,531,986	66.50	30,302	2,334,005	5,139,055	45.42	0	0	20	6	Rejected
Building society savings	980,273	44.19	1,237,825	55.81	93,825	2,311,923	5,139,055	44.99	4	1	16	5	Rejected
Second homes	1,152,598	50.63	1,123,802	49.37	45,551	2,321,951	5,139,055	45.18	12	3	8	3	Accepted
Source: Direct Democracy

Results by sub-national issue were:

1. Zurich: "sex boxes" – Approved.
2. Geneva: "protest restrictions and increased fines" – Approved.

=== Reactions ===
After the vote results were tallied and the results released, the SBA reacted to the rejection of the holiday measure saying that it was in realisation of "something which sounds nice at first, brings many disadvantages on closer look." However, though labour unions were disappointed with the result, the president of Travaile.Suisse, Martin Fluegel, said that he was still "proud to have raised the theme of overwork."

== June referendums ==
The three June referendums asked voters questions on healthcare, foreign policy and assistance with purchasing homes.

- The foreign policy question was whether a referendum should be held on every international treaty signed by the federal government. It was organised by the Action for an Independent and Neutral Switzerland, which is close to the Swiss People's Party.
- The healthcare question asked voters whether they approved of the federal government's proposed "managed care" law.
- The third question was on assistance with savings for home buyers.

All three were rejected by voters.

=== Results ===
Question	For		Against		Invalid/ blank	Total votes	Registered voters	Turnout	Cantons for		Cantons against		Result
Question	Votes	%	Votes	%	Invalid/ blank	Total votes	Registered voters	Turnout	Full	Half	Full	Half	Result
Foreign treaties	480,173	24.72	1,462,659	75.28	40,872	1,983,704	5,149,086	38.53	0	0	20	6	Rejected
Managed care law	466,993	23.95	1,482,536	76.05	40,703	1,990,232	5,149,086	38.65					Rejected
Savings assistance	601,449	31.09	1,332,839	68.91	49,750	1,984,038	5,149,086	38.53	0	0	20	6	Rejected
Source: Direct Democracy

== September referendums ==
Three referendums were held on 23 September on a smoking ban, secure housing in old age, and music in schools.

- The smoking ban referendum was based on a popular initiative by the Lung League, who sought to clarify and make uniform the national smoking ban and to eliminate smoking rooms and smoking establishments, which had been allowed in some cantons; but it was rejected by 66% of voters.
- The secure housing in old age proposal would have allowed pensioner households to obtain lower property valuation by opting to forgo debt deductions from house ownership taxes, but was rejected by 52.6% of voters.
- The music lessons proposal originally would have required the federal and cantonal governments to promote music lessons for children. However, the federal government claimed that this was contrary to cantonal sovereignty over educational matters. As a result, a counterproposal was negotiated to replace it, and was approved by 72.7% of voters.

=== Results ===
Question	For		Against		Invalid/ blank	Total votes	Registered voters	Turnout	Cantons for		Cantons against		Result
Question	Votes	%	Votes	%	Invalid/ blank	Total votes	Registered voters	Turnout	Full	Half	Full	Half	Result
Smoking ban	741,205	34.01	1,437,985	65.99	30,205	2,209,395	5,160,811	42.81	1	0	19	6	Rejected
Secure housing	1,014,016	47.39	1,125,495	52.61	55,216	2,194,727	5,160,811	42.53	9	1	11	5	Rejected
Music lessons	1,552,045	72.69	583,231	27.31	53,482	2,188,758	5,160,811	42.41	20	6	0	0	Accepted
Source: Direct Democracy

== November referendum ==
The final referendum of the year was held on 25 November on the Swiss Animal Diseases Act, and was approved by 68% of voters.

Choice	Votes	%
For	946,220	68.3
Against	439,484	31.7
Invalid/blank votes	40,126	–
Total	1,425,830	100
Registered voters/turnout	5,166,732	27.6
Source: Bundeskanzler
