= 1994 Swiss referendums =

Thirteen referendums were held in Switzerland during 1994. The first five were held on 20 February on federal resolutions on roadbuilding, continuing existing truck tolls and varying tolls based on engine power or mileage, as well as a popular initiative "for the protection of the alpine region from through traffic" and an amendment to the aeronautical law. All five were approved by voters. The second set of referendums was held on 12 June on federal resolutions on an article on the Swiss Federal Constitution on the promotion of culture and a review of the procedure for naturalising young immigrants, as well as a federal law on Swiss troops in peacekeeping operations. Whilst the resolutions were both approved by a majority of voters, they did not receive the approval from the majority of cantons, so were rejected, as was the law on troops.

The next two referendums were held on 25 September on abolishing price reductions on breadstuffs and an amendment to the Strafgesetzbuch and the military penal code, both of which were approved. The final three referendums were held on 4 December on federal laws on health insurance and foreigners, and a popular initiative "for a healthy health insurance". The two laws were approved and the initiative rejected.

== Results ==
Month	Question	For		Against		Blank/invalid		Total	Registered voters	Turnout	Cantons for		Cantons against	
Month	Question	Votes	%	Votes	%	Blank	Invalid	Total	Registered voters	Turnout	Full	Half	Full	Half
February	Roadbuilding	1,259,609	68.5	579,877	31.5	21,337	2,575	1,863,398	4,567,573	40.8	18	6	2	0
February	Continuing existing truck tolls	1,324,242	72.2	509,222	27.8	26,348	2,719	1,862,531	4,567,573	40.8	20	6	0	0
February	Varying truck tolls based on engine size	1,221,630	67.1	597,911	32.9	38,812	2,855	1,861,208	4,567,573	40.7	18	6	2	0
February	Popular initiative on protection of the alpine region from traffic (Alps initiative)	954,491	51.9	884,362	48.1	23,436	2,822	1,865,111	4,567,573	40.8	13	6	7	0
February	Amendment to the aeronautical law	1,081,844	61.1	689,715	38.96	80,734	3,752	1,856,045	4,567,573	40.6				
June	Constitutional article on culture promotion	1,059,025	51.0	1,018,188	49.9	50,640	3,936	2,131,789	4,572,713	46.6	10	2	10	4
June	Citizenship for young immigrants	1,114,158	52.8	994,457	47.2	25,899	3,430	2,137,944	4,572,713	46.8	9	2	11	4
June	Federal law on Swiss peacekeeping troops	899,626	42.8	1,203,736	57.2	31,998	3,613	2,138,973	4,572,713	46.8				
September	Abolishing price reductions on bread products	1,288,697	64.6	706,379	35.4	82,941	4,689	2,082,706	4,576,512	45.5	20	6	0	0
September	Amendments to the Strafgesetzbuch and military penal code	1,132,662	54.6	939,975	45.5	24,910	3,192	2,100,739	4,576,512	45.9				
December	Federal law on health insurance	1,021,175	51.8	950,360	48.2	37,612	5,328	2,014,475	4,580,035	44.0				
December	Popular initiative for a healthy health insurance initiative	460,674	23.4	1,504,177	76.6	43,849	5,550	2,014,250	4,580,035	44.0	0	0	20	6
December	Federal law on foreigners	1,435,040	72.9	533,297	27.1	42,333	5,905	2,016,575	4,580,035	44.0				
Source: Nohlen & Stöver
