= 1971 Swiss referendums =

Three referendums held in Switzerland in 1971

Three referendums were held in Switzerland in 1971. The first was held on 7 February on introducing women's suffrage at the federal level, and was approved by 66% of voters. The second and third were held on 6 June on a constitutional amendment to introduce the human right to a non-hazardous environment and a federal resolution on federal finances. In the first referendum in which women were allowed to vote, both were approved by voters.

== Results ==
=== February: Women's suffrage ===
Women's suffrage vote results

Choice	Popular vote		Cantons		
Choice	Votes	%	Full	Half	Total
For	621,109	65.7	14	3	15.5
Against	323,882	34.3	5	3	6.5
Blank votes	8,600	–	–	–	–
Invalid votes	1,730	–	–	–	–
Total	955,321	100	19	6	22
Registered voters/turnout	1,654,708	57.7	–	–	–
Source: Nohlen & Stöver

=== June: Constitutional amendment ===
Choice	Popular vote		Cantons		
Choice	Votes	%	Full	Half	Total
For	1,222,931	92.7	19	6	22
Against	96,359	7.3	0	0	0
Blank votes	28,252	–	–	–	–
Invalid votes	2,066	–	–	–	–
Total	1,349,608	100	19	6	22
Registered voters/turnout	3,565,435	37.9	–	–	–
Source: Nohlen & Stöver

=== June: Federal finances ===
Choice	Popular vote		Cantons		
Choice	Votes	%	Full	Half	Total
For	930,878	72.7	19	6	22
Against	348,702	27.3	0	0	0
Blank votes	64,306	–	–	–	–
Invalid votes	2,477	–	–	–	–
Total	1,346,363	100	19	6	22
Registered voters/turnout	3,565,435	37.8	–	–	–
Source: Nohlen & Stöver
