= 1990 Swiss referendums =

Ten referendums were held in Switzerland in 1990. The first six were held on 1 April on four popular initiatives, a federal resolution on viticulture and an amendment to the federal law on the organisation of the federal judiciary. The four popular initiatives were all related to roadbuilding; "Stop the concrete – for a limitation on road making," "for an autobahn-free countryside between Murten and Yverdon," "for an autobahn-free Knonauer Amt," and "for a free Aarelandschaft between Biel and Solothurn/Zuchwil." All six were rejected by voters.

The last four were held on 23 September on two popular initiatives to phase out nuclear power and to stop the construction of any new nuclear power plants, as well as on a federal resolution on the energy article in the Swiss Federal Constitution and an amendment to the federal law on road traffic. Whilst the nuclear power phase-out was rejected, the other three proposals were approved.

== Results ==
=== April: Popular initiative to limit roadbuilding ===
| Choice | Popular vote | | Cantons | | |
| Choice | Votes | % | Full | Half | Total |
|---|---|---|---|---|---|
| For | 500,615 | 28.5 | 0 | 0 | 0 |
| Against | 1,255,197 | 71.5 | 20 | 6 | 23 |
| Blank votes | 21,580 | – | – | – | – |
| Invalid votes | 2,107 | – | – | – | – |
| Total | 1,779,499 | 100 | 20 | 6 | 23 |
| Registered voters/turnout | 4,327,120 | 41.1 | – | – | – |
Source: Nohlen & Stöver

=== April: Popular initiative for an autobahn-free countryside between Murten and Yverdon ===
| Choice | Popular vote | | Cantons | | |
| Choice | Votes | % | Full | Half | Total |
|---|---|---|---|---|---|
| For | 571,648 | 32.7 | 0 | 0 | 0 |
| Against | 1,175,356 | 67.3 | 20 | 6 | 23 |
| Blank votes | 28,920 | – | – | – | – |
| Invalid votes | 2,248 | – | – | – | – |
| Total | 1,778,172 | 100 | 20 | 6 | 23 |
| Registered voters/turnout | 4,327,120 | 41.1 | – | – | – |
Source: Nohlen & Stöver

=== April: Popular initiative for an autobahn-free Knonauer Amt ===
| Choice | Popular vote | | Cantons | | |
| Choice | Votes | % | Full | Half | Total |
|---|---|---|---|---|---|
| For | 547,359 | 31.1 | 0 | 0 | 0 |
| Against | 1,197,701 | 68.6 | 20 | 6 | 23 |
| Blank votes | 32,026 | – | – | – | – |
| Invalid votes | 2,611 | – | – | – | – |
| Total | 1,779,697 | 100 | 20 | 6 | 23 |
| Registered voters/turnout | 4,327,120 | 41.1 | – | – | – |
Source: Nohlen & Stöver

=== April: Popular initiative for a free Aarelandschaft between Biel and Solothurn/Zuchwil ===
| Choice | Popular vote | | Cantons | | |
| Choice | Votes | % | Full | Half | Total |
|---|---|---|---|---|---|
| For | 592,237 | 34.0 | 0 | 0 | 0 |
| Against | 1,147,459 | 66.0 | 20 | 6 | 23 |
| Blank votes | 34,604 | – | – | – | – |
| Invalid votes | 2,333 | – | – | – | – |
| Total | 1,776,633 | 100 | 20 | 6 | 23 |
| Registered voters/turnout | 4,327,120 | 41.1 | – | – | – |
Source: Nohlen & Stöver

=== April: Federal resolution on viticulture ===
| Choice | Votes | % |
|---|---|---|
| For | 771,207 | 46.7 |
| Against | 881,609 | 53.3 |
| Blank votes | 109,745 | – |
| Invalid votes | 3,679 | – |
| Total | 1,766,240 | 100 |
| Registered voters/turnout | 4,327,120 | 40.8 |
Source: Nohlen & Stöver

=== April: Amendment to the federal law on the judiciary ===
| Choice | Votes | % |
|---|---|---|
| For | 775,885 | 47.4 |
| Against | 862,538 | 52.6 |
| Blank votes | 120,437 | – |
| Invalid votes | 3,721 | – |
| Total | 1,762,581 | 100 |
| Registered voters/turnout | 4,327,120 | 40.7 |
Source: Nohlen & Stöver

=== September: Popular initiative on phasing out nuclear power ===
| Choice | Popular vote | | Cantons | | |
| Choice | Votes | % | Full | Half | Total |
|---|---|---|---|---|---|
| For | 816,300 | 47.1 | 6 | 2 | 7 |
| Against | 915,749 | 52.9 | 14 | 4 | 16 |
| Blank votes | 21,690 | – | – | – | – |
| Invalid votes | 2,539 | – | – | – | – |
| Total | 1,756,278 | 100 | 20 | 6 | 23 |
| Registered voters/turnout | 4,345,490 | 40.4 | – | – | – |
Source: Nohlen & Stöver

=== September: Popular initiative on stopping the construction of nuclear power plants ===
| Choice | Popular vote | | Cantons | | |
| Choice | Votes | % | Full | Half | Total |
|---|---|---|---|---|---|
| For | 946,087 | 54.5 | 17 | 5 | 19.5 |
| Against | 789,219 | 45.5 | 3 | 1 | 3.5 |
| Blank votes | 19,375 | – | – | – | – |
| Invalid votes | 2,446 | – | – | – | – |
| Total | 1,757,127 | 100 | 20 | 6 | 23 |
| Registered voters/turnout | 4,345,490 | 40.4 | – | – | – |
Source: Nohlen & Stöver

=== September: Energy article in the federal constitution ===
| Choice | Popular vote | | Cantons | | |
| Choice | Votes | % | Full | Half | Total |
|---|---|---|---|---|---|
| For | 1,214,940 | 71.1 | 20 | 6 | 23 |
| Against | 493,846 | 28.9 | 0 | 0 | 0 |
| Blank votes | 41,246 | – | – | – | – |
| Invalid votes | 2,930 | – | – | – | – |
| Total | 1,752,962 | 100 | 20 | 6 | 23 |
| Registered voters/turnout | 4,345,490 | 40.3 | – | – | – |
Source: Nohlen & Stöver

=== September: Amendment to the federal road traffic law ===
| Choice | Votes | % |
|---|---|---|
| For | 898,958 | 52.8 |
| Against | 803,733 | 47.2 |
| Blank votes | 45,612 | – |
| Invalid votes | 2,907 | – |
| Total | 1,751,210 | 100 |
| Registered voters/turnout | 4,345,490 | 40.3 |
Source: Nohlen & Stöver
