= Switzerland–European Union relations =

European Union–Switzerland relations
- European Union: Switzerland

Switzerland is not a member state of the European Union (EU) or the European Economic Area (EEA), despite being a member of the European Free Trade Area (EFTA). It is associated with the Union through a series of bilateral treaties in which Switzerland has adopted various provisions of EU law in order to participate in the European Single Market, without joining the EU. Among Switzerland's neighbouring countries, all but one (Liechtenstein) are EU member states (though all including Liechtenstein are EEA members). Switzerland borders four EU member states: Austria, France, Germany and Italy.

== Trade ==
The European Union is Switzerland's largest trading partner, and Switzerland is the EU's fourth largest trading partner, after the United Kingdom, United States and China. Export of goods from Switzerland accounts for 5.2% of the EU's imports; mainly chemicals, medicinal products, machinery, instruments and time pieces. In terms of services, the EU's exports to Switzerland amounted to €67.0 billion in 2008 while imports from Switzerland stood at €47.2 billion.

== Treaties ==
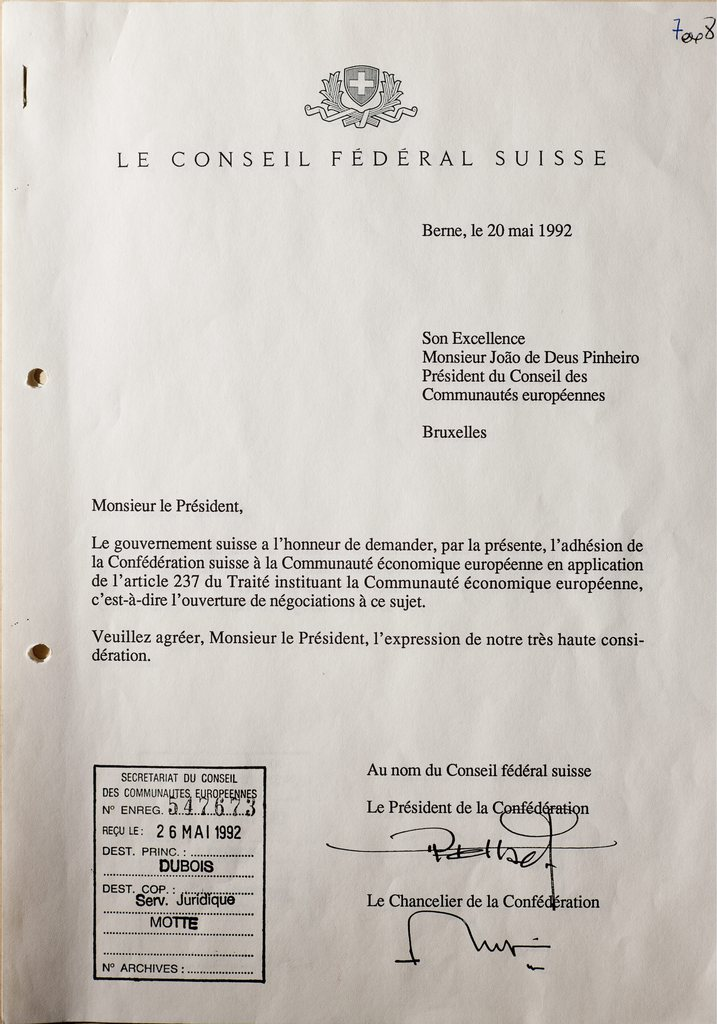
Letter regarding membership negotiations

Switzerland signed a free-trade agreement with the then European Economic Community in 1972, which entered into force in 1973.

Switzerland is a member of the European Free Trade Association (EFTA), and took part in negotiating the European Economic Area (EEA) agreement with the European Union. It signed the agreement on 2 May 1992, and submitted an application for accession to the EU on 20 May 1992. However, after a Swiss referendum held on 6 December 1992 rejected EEA membership by 50.3% to 49.7%, the Swiss government decided to suspend negotiations for EU membership until further notice. These did not resume and in 2016, Switzerland formally withdrew its application for EU membership. Switzerland is also a member of Schengen Area and Single Euro Payments Area (SEPA).

In 1994, Switzerland and the EU started negotiations about a special relationship outside the EEA. Switzerland wanted to safeguard the economic integration with the EU that the EEA treaty would have permitted, while purging the relationship of the points of contention that had led to the people rejecting the referendum. Swiss politicians stressed the bilateral nature of these negotiations, where negotiations were conducted between two equal partners and not between 16, 26, 28 or 29, as is the case for EU treaty negotiations.

These negotiations resulted in a total of ten treaties, negotiated in two phases, the sum of which makes a large share of EU law applicable to Switzerland. The treaties are:

Bilateral I agreements (signed 1999, in effect 1 June 2002)

1. Free movement of people
2. Air traffic
3. Road traffic
4. Agricultural products
5. Technical trade barriers
6. Public procurement
7. Science

Bilateral II agreements (signed 2004, in effect gradually between 2005 and 2009)

1. Security and asylum and Schengen membership
2. Cooperation in fraud pursuits
3. Final stipulations in open questions about agriculture, environment, media, education, care of the elderly, statistics and services. This strand established the Common Veterinary Area.

The Bilateral I agreements are expressed to be mutually dependent. If any one of them is denounced or not renewed, they all cease to apply. According to the preamble of the EU decision ratifying the agreements:

The seven agreements are intimately linked to one another by the requirement that they are to come into force at the same time and that they are to cease to apply at the same time, six months after the receipt of a non-renewal or denunciation notice concerning any one of them.

This is referred to as the "guillotine clause". While the bilateral approach theoretically safeguards the right to refuse the application of new EU rules to Switzerland, in practice the scope to do so is limited by the clause. The agreement on the European Economic Area contains a similar clause.

Bilateral agreements are managed by joint Swiss-EU committees. They are responsible for ensuring that the agreements run smoothly, adapting them where possible, exchanging information and discussing any disputes. Twenty-one such committees existed in September 2021. This system is criticized by the European Union, which finds it too complex.

Before 2014, the bilateral approach, as it is called in Switzerland, was consistently supported by the Swiss people in referendums. It allows the Swiss to keep a sense of sovereignty, due to arrangements when changes in EU law will only apply after the EU–Swiss Joint Committee decides so in consensus. It also limits the EU influence to the ten areas, where the EEA includes more areas, with more exceptions than the EEA has.

From the perspective of the EU, the treaties contain largely the same content as the EEA treaties, making Switzerland a virtual member of the EEA. Most EU law applies universally throughout the EU, the EEA and Switzerland, providing most of the conditions of the free movement of people, goods, services and capital that apply to the member states. Switzerland pays into the EU budget. Switzerland has extended the bilateral treaties to new EU member states; each extension required the approval of Swiss voters in a referendum.

In a referendum on 5 June 2005, Swiss voters agreed, by a 55% majority, to join the Schengen Area. This came into effect on 12 December 2008.

In 2009, the Swiss voted to extend the free movement of people to Bulgaria and Romania by 59.6% in favour to 40.4% against. While the EU Directive 2004/38/EC on the right to move and reside freely does not apply to Switzerland, the Swiss-EU bilateral agreement on the free movement of people contains the same rights both for Swiss and EU nationals, and their family members.

By 2010, Switzerland had amassed around 210 trade treaties with the EU. Following the institutional changes in the EU–particularly regarding foreign policy and the increased role of the European Parliament–European Council President Herman Van Rompuy and Swiss President Doris Leuthard expressed a desire to "reset" EU-Swiss relations with an easier and cleaner way of applying EU law in Switzerland. In December 2012, the Council of the European Union declared that there will be no further treaties on single market issues unless Switzerland and EU agree on a new legal framework similar to the EEA that, among others, would bind Switzerland more closely to the evolving EU legislation. José Manuel Barroso, the President of the European Commission, later affirmed this position. However, a second referendum on Swiss EEA membership wasn't expected at that time, and the Swiss public remained opposed to joining.

=== Schengen Agreement ===
In 2009, Switzerland became a participant in the Schengen Area with the acceptance of an association agreement by popular referendum in 2005. This means that there are no passport controls on Switzerland's borders with its neighbours though customs controls continue to apply.

=== 2014 referendum ===
In a referendum in February 2014, the Swiss voters narrowly approved a proposal to limit the freedom of movement of foreign citizens to Switzerland. The European Commission said it would have to examine the implications of the result on EU–Swiss relations since literal implementation would invoke the guillotine clause.

On 22 December 2016, Switzerland and the EU concluded an agreement whereby a new Swiss law (in response to the referendum) would require Swiss employers to prioritise Swiss-based job seekers (whether Swiss nationals or non-Swiss citizens registered in Swiss job agencies) whilst continuing to observe the free movement of EU citizens into Switzerland thus allowing them to work there.

=== Swiss financial contributions ===
Since 2008, Switzerland has contributed CHF 1.3 billion towards various projects designed to reduce the economic and social disparities in an enlarged EU. One example of how this money is used is Legionowo railway station, Poland, which was redeveloped with CHF 9.6 million from the Swiss budget.

=== Proposed framework accord ===
Negotiations between Switzerland and the European Commission on an institutional framework accord began in 2014 and concluded in November 2018. On 7 December 2018, the Swiss Federal Council decided to neither accept nor decline the negotiated accord, instead opting for a public consultation. The negotiated accord would cover five areas of existing agreements between the EU and Switzerland made in 1999:

- free movement of persons
- air transport
- carriage of goods and passengers by rail and road
- trade in agricultural products
- mutual recognition of standards

Notably, the accord would facilitate EU law in these fields to be readily transposed into Swiss law, and the European Court of Justice would be the final and binding arbiter on disputes in these fields. If the accord were accepted by Switzerland, the country would be in a similar position with regard to imposition of EU law (albeit only in the above five fields) as that in the other EFTA countries which are members of the EEA. Further to matters of sovereignty, specific concerns raised in Switzerland include possible effect on state aid law on the cantonal banks, the potential for transposition of them into Swiss law (and any resulting effect on social welfare, for example) and the possible effect on wages enjoyed in the country. Accepting the accord is considered by the commission to be necessary to allow Swiss access to new fields of the European single market, including the electricity market and stock exchange equivalence.

By June 2019, the Swiss Federal Council found no meaningful compromise neither with the internal consulting partners, such as Swiss labour unions and business representatives, nor with the outgoing EU-commission president Jean-Claude Juncker. EU-member countries also expressed that no further compromise on the text of the proposed framework accord with Switzerland would be possible. As a result, Brussels did not extend its stock market equivalence to the Swiss stock exchange because of this breakdown of Swiss-EU negotiations, and for a counter-measure, the Swiss Federal Council ordinance from November 2018 was implemented, limiting the future exchange of most EU-traded Swiss stocks to the SIX Swiss Exchange in Zürich.

The negotiations on the proposed framework accord between Switzerland the EU were restarted on 23 April 2021, when Swiss Federal Councilor Guy Parmelin and EU-commission president Ursula von der Leyen met in Brussels. The meeting took place in a friendly atmosphere, but no agreement could be attained as the federal councilor insisted on excluding key issues such as protection of Swiss wages, Citizens' Rights Directive, and state aid for cantonal banks from the agreement. The following week, Stéphanie Riso, Deputy Head of Cabinet for the EU commission, informed representatives of the 27 member countries of the progress with regard to the framework accord with Switzerland. The EU commission perceived the Swiss demands as an ultimatum, and the EU member countries expressed support for the EU-leadership in the negotiations. Foreign Minister Ignazio Cassis told reporters that the impasse was due to a different interpretation of the "free movement of people" clause in the framework accord. In September 2020, Swiss voters clearly rejected a ballot measure by the Swiss People's Party to limit the free movement of persons, and decided to favour bilateral agreements with the EU. According to internal reports by the Swiss Federal Council, failed negotiations with the EU-commission already took place on 11 November 2020 when chief negotiator Livia Leu took the podium for Swiss-EU talks.

On 26 May 2021, Switzerland decided to again suspend negotiations with the EU and not sign the drafted EU-Swiss Institutional Framework Agreement. The main disagreements were about freedom of movement, the level playing field and state aid rules.

On 15 November 2021, Maroš Šefčovič, EU Vice President responsible for Swiss-EU negotiations and Brexit struck a more conciliatory tone with Swiss Foreign Minister Ignazio Cassis, when they met in Brussels. The two sides agreed to establish a structured political dialogue at ministerial level, and re-open bilateral talks in early 2022. The Swiss Foreign minister in particular insisted that Switzerland be integrated back into the Erasmus+ and the Horizon Europe programmes. At stake were a number of agreements between Switzerland and the EU, including future access to EU's electricity market, as well as EU citizens' availability of Swiss social security benefits.

In December 2023, the Swiss Federal Council agreed to reinitiate negotiations with Brussels on bilateral relations with regard to the framework accord. The decision came after a two-year period of previously undisclosed preparations and reflects the opinion of the Swiss population to find a realistic approach for a stable relationship with the EU. The draft mandate was the result of numerous meetings on a diplomatic level as well as extensive internal discussions with unions and Swiss business representatives. With the choice of a new negotiating team, Switzerland expects that it will find a more effective strategy to create optimal conditions for a satisfactory result in the upcoming negotiations. Mainly the "super guillotine clause", which previously ended the discussion with the EU, was removed to avoid a premature failure of future talks, and the new draft, agreed upon by a joint statement, would allow an open-ended discourse on all levels including the free movement of people, land transport, air transport, which are completely revised, and technical barriers to trade and agriculture as well as electricity, food safety and health, with all three allowing for direct subsidies. The responsibility of the European court on Swiss legal questions includes more limitations. The new draft mandate was then to be ratified by the Swiss cantons, the federal parliament and approved by the EU commission by the end of 2023. Both sides had come a long way to create the new draft, according to the Swiss foreign minister Ignazio Cassis.

On March 18, 2024, Swiss Federal Councilor Viola Amherd and chief of the European Commission Ursula von der Leyen met in Brussels for a first meeting. Von der Leyen warmly welcomed the Swiss delegation including chief negotiator Patric Franzen. The EU Commission president struck an optimistic tone and expressed hope that the agreement could conclude by the end of 2024, while Amherd stressed the qualitative criteria for Switzerland rather than the tempo of the negotiations. Amherd also met the vice-president of the European Commission Maros Sefcovic and EU chief negotiator Richard Szostak during lunch. The EU and Switzerland are economically interconnected to a high degree, and both sides hope for more stability between the European trading zone and the export-oriented economy of the Swiss Confederation. Switzerland would benefit to reconnect with the Horizon academic program, and have better access to the European market, but other critical aspects such as the protection of Swiss wages are a serious concern for Swiss labour unions. On the right side of the Swiss political spectrum, many exponents of the conservative Swiss People's party (SVP) reject the negotiations for a framework accord altogether as they fear economic disadvantages and a loss of political independence from the European Union. According to the European Commission, the talks entered their sixth round in late August 2024. The progress of the discussions was described as slow but steady with the main sticking points remaining, namely the 'free movement of people' as well as the 'protection of Swiss wages'. The talks continued in mid-September and were presumed to be completed by the end of 2024.

The "third bilateral package" was approved by the Swiss cabinet in June 2025. While the Swiss federal government has accepted the agreement, the consultation process lasted until the end of October 2025, when the measure was decided in Swiss parliament. Switzerland sees the agreement as a 'strategic necessity' rather than a political approach. According to the principles of direct democracy, a referendum will be held probably in 2028.

== Chronology of the Swiss votes ==
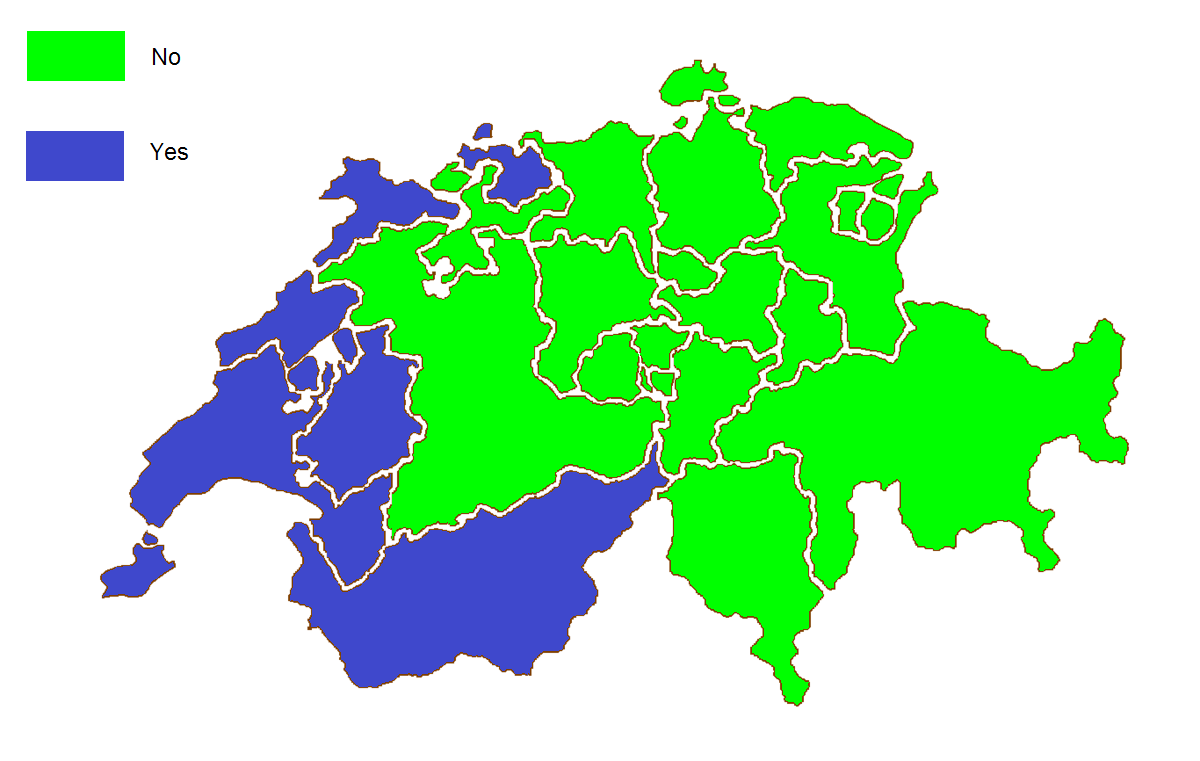
Swiss European Economic Area referendum of 1992 results by Cantons Yes-votes No-votes

Chronology of Swiss votes about the European Union:

- 3 December 1972: free trade agreement with the European Communities is approved by 72.5% of voters
- 6 December 1992: joining the European Economic Area is rejected by 50.3% of voters. This vote strongly highlighted the cultural divide between the German- and the French-speaking cantons, the Röstigraben. The only German-speaking cantons voting for the EEA were Basel-Stadt and Basel-Landschaft, which border on France and Germany.
- 8 June 1997: the federal popular initiative "negotiations concerning EU membership: let the people decide!" on requiring the approval of a referendum and the Cantons to launch accession negotiations with the EU (« Négociations d'adhésion à l'UE : que le peuple décide ! ») is rejected by 74.1% of voters.
- 21 May 2000: the Bilateral agreements with the EU are accepted by 67.2% of voters.
- 4 March 2001: the federal popular initiative "Yes to Europe!" (« Oui à l'Europe ! ») on opening accession negotiations with the EU is rejected by 76.8% of voters.
- 5 June 2005: the Schengen Agreement and the Dublin Regulation are approved by 54.6% of voters.
- 25 September 2005: the extension of the free movement of persons to the ten new members of the European Union is accepted by 56.0% of voters.
- 26 November 2006: a cohesion contribution of one billion for the ten new member states of the European Union (Eastern Europe Cooperation Act) is approved by 53.4% of voters.
- 8 February 2009: the extension of the free movement of persons to new EU members Bulgaria and Romania is approved by 59.61% of voters.
- 17 May 2009: introduction of biometric passports, as required by the Schengen acquis, is approved by 50.15% of voters.
- 17 June 2012: the federal popular initiative "international agreements: let the people speak!" (« Accords internationaux : la parole au peuple ! ») on requiring all international treaties to be approved in a referendum launched by the Campaign for an Independent and Neutral Switzerland is rejected by 75.3% of voters.
- 9 February 2014: the federal popular initiative "against mass immigration", which would limit the free movement of people from EU member states, is accepted by 50.3% of voters.
- 28 February 2016: the popular initiative "For the effective expulsion of foreign criminals", which would automatically expel from the country any foreigner who committed a crime (regardless of the severity of the crime), and therefore undermine EU freedom of movement, is rejected by 58.9% of voters.
- 19 May 2019: an optional referendum on transposing the European gun control directive (an update to the Schengen acquis) into Swiss law, is approved by 63.7% of voters.
- 27 September 2020: the popular initiative "For moderate immigration", which would require the government to withdraw from the 1999 Agreement on the Free Movement of Persons and prevent the conclusion of future agreements which grant the free movement of people to foreign nationals, is rejected by 61.7% of voters.
- 15 May 2022: the adoption of the EU regulation on the European Border and Coast Guard, which would increase the Swiss government's contribution to the Frontex border agency, is approved by 71.5% of voters.

Among these sixteen votes, just three are against further integration or for reversing integration with the European Union (6 December 1992, 4 March 2001, and 9 February 2014); the other thirteen votes are in favour of either deepening or maintaining integration between Switzerland and the European Union.

== Potential accession of Switzerland to the European Union ==
Countries that could join the European Union Current members Candidate countries Applicant / potential candidate countries Membership possible Membership not possible

Switzerland took part in negotiating the EEA agreement with the EU and signed the agreement on 2 May 1992 and submitted an application for accession to the EU on 20 May 1992. A Swiss referendum held on 6 December 1992 rejected EEA membership. As a consequence, the Swiss Government suspended negotiations for EU accession until further notice. With the ratification of the second round of bilateral treaties, the Swiss Federal Council downgraded their characterisation of a full EU membership of Switzerland from a "strategic goal" to an "option" in 2006. Membership continued to be the objective of the government and was a "long-term aim" of the Federal Council until 2016, when Switzerland's frozen application was withdrawn. The motion was passed by the Council of States and then by the Federal Council in June. In a letter dated 27 July the Federal Council informed the Presidency of the Council of the European Union that it was withdrawing its application.

Concerns about loss of neutrality and sovereignty are the key issues against membership for some citizens. A 2018 survey of public opinion in Switzerland found "65% of Swiss voters" want to continue bilateral agreements with the EU, and only 3% considered that joining the EU was a feasible option.

The popular initiative entitled "Yes to Europe!", calling for the opening of immediate negotiations for EU membership, was rejected in a 4 March 2001 referendum by 76.8% and all cantons. The Swiss Federal Council, which was in favour of EU membership, had advised the population to vote against this referendum, since the preconditions for the opening of negotiations had not been met.

During the history of EU-Swiss relations, the country has undergone several substantial changes in foreign policies, depending on the democratic outcomes of ballot measures. Specific agreements with the EU on freedom of movement for workers and areas concerning tax evasion were first addressed during the Switzerland–EU summit in May 2004 where nine bilateral agreements were signed. Romano Prodi, former President of the European Commission, said the agreements "moved Switzerland closer to Europe." Joseph Deiss of the Swiss Federal Council said, "We might not be at the very centre of Europe but we're definitely at the heart of Europe". He continued, "We're beginning a new era of relations between our two entities."

The Swiss population agreed to their country's participation in the Schengen Agreement and joined the area in December 2008.

The result of the referendum on extending the freedom of movement of people to Bulgaria and Romania, which joined the EU on 1 January 2007 caused Switzerland to breach its obligations to the EU. The Swiss government declared in September 2009 that bilateral treaties are not solutions and the membership debate has to be examined again while the left-wing Green Party and the Social Democratic Party stated that they would renew their push for EU membership for Switzerland.

In the February 2014 Swiss immigration referendum, a federal popular initiative "against mass immigration", Swiss voters narrowly approved measures limiting the freedom of movement of foreign citizens to Switzerland. The European Commission said it would have to examine the implications of the result on EU–Swiss relations. Due to the refusal of Switzerland to grant Croatia free movement of persons, the EU accepted Switzerland's access to the Erasmus+ student mobility programme only as a "partner country", as opposed to a "programme country", and the EU froze negotiations on access to the EU electricity market. On 4 March 2016, Switzerland and the EU signed a treaty that extends the agreement on the free movement of people to Croatia, which led to Switzerland's full readmission into Horizon 2020, a European funding framework for research and development. The treaty was ratified by the National Council on 26 April on the condition that a solution be found to an impasse on implementing the 2014 referendum. The treaty was passed in December 2016. This allowed Switzerland to rejoin Horizon 2020 on 1 January 2017.

A poll in December 2022 to mark 30 years since the 1992 EEA referendum indicated that 71% would vote for EEA participation if a referendum were held. For common Swiss people, a major difference between EEA and the Swiss agreement, is that EEA includes free movement for services including roaming prices for mobile phones. A members bill about joining EEA in 2022 was mostly rejected by the Federal council (government) considering the present treaties better for Switzerland.

A poll in March 2023 found that support for integrating with the EU has increased. The overall positive attitudes toward the EU have increased, with "Sixty-five percent [saying they] would support Switzerland adopting EU law" and "Fifty-five percent would accept a role for the European Court of Justice in dispute resolution". 60% support joining the EEA.

== Foreign policy ==
In the field of foreign and security policy, Switzerland and the EU have no overarching agreements. But in its Security Report 2000, the Swiss Federal Council announced the importance of contributing to stability and peace beyond Switzerland's borders and of building an international community of common values. Subsequently, Switzerland started to collaborate in projects of EU's Common Foreign and Security Policy (CFSP). Switzerland has contributed staff or material to EU peace keeping and security missions in Bosnia and Herzegovina, the Democratic Republic of the Congo, Kosovo, North Macedonia and the province of Aceh, Indonesia.

Close cooperation has also been established in the area of international sanctions. As of 2006, Switzerland has adopted five EU sanctions that were instituted outside of the United Nations. Those affected the former Republic of Yugoslavia (1998), Myanmar (2000), Zimbabwe (2002), Uzbekistan (2006) and Belarus (2006).

== Use of the euro in Switzerland ==
The currency of Switzerland is the Swiss franc. Switzerland (with Liechtenstein) is in the unusual position of being surrounded by countries that use the euro. As a result, the euro is de facto accepted in many places, especially near borders and in tourist regions. Swiss Federal Railways accept euros, both at ticket counters and in automatic ticket machines. Also many public phones, vending machines or ticket machines accept euro coins. Many shops and smaller businesses that accept euros take notes only, and give change in Swiss francs, usually at a less favourable exchange rate than banks. Many bank cash machines issue euros at the traded exchange rate as well as Swiss francs.

On 6 September 2011, the Swiss franc effectively became fixed against the euro: the Franc had always floated independently until its rapid currency appreciation during the eurozone debt crisis. The Swiss National Bank set an CHF/EUR peg that involved a minimum exchange rate of 1.20 francs to the euro, with no upper bound in place. The Bank committed to maintaining this exchange rate to ensure stability. The peg was abandoned on 15 January 2015, when renewed upward pressure on the Swiss franc exceeded the Bank's level of tolerance.

== Switzerland's foreign relations with EU member states ==
- Austria
- Belgium
- Bulgaria
- Croatia
- Cyprus
- Czech Republic
- Denmark
- Estonia
- Finland
- France
- Germany
- Greece
- Hungary
- (Republic of Ireland) Ireland
- Italy
- Latvia
- Lithuania
- Luxembourg
- Malta
- Netherlands
- Poland
- Portugal
- Romania
- Slovakia
- Slovenia
- Spain
- Sweden

== Diplomatic relations between Switzerland and EU member states ==
Country	Date of first diplomatic relations	Swiss embassy	Reciprocal embassy	Notes
Austria	Middle Ages (by 1513)	Vienna; Honorary consulates: Bregenz, Graz, Innsbruck, Klagenfurt, Linz, Salzburg	Bern; Consulate General: Zürich; Honorary consulates: Basel, Chur, Geneva, Lausanne, Lugano, Lucerne, St. Gallen	Joint organization of Euro 2008, 165 km of common border.
Belgium	1838	Brussels; Honorary consulate: Wilrijk (Antwerp)	Bern; Consulate General: Geneva; Honorary consulates: Basel, Lugano, Neuchâtel, St. Gallen, Zürich	Swiss Mission to EU and NATO in Brussels.
Bulgaria	1905 (Note: Switzerland officially recognized Bulgaria on 28 November 1879.)	Sofia	Bern	
Croatia	1991	Zagreb; Consulate: Split	Bern; Consulates: Zürich, Lugano	
Cyprus	1960 (Note: Year of proclamation of Republic of Cyprus.)	Nicosia (Note: Switzerland had a consular agency in Cyprus since 1937. In 1983 this became a Consulate General and in 1990 an embassy.)	Rome (Italy); Consulates General: Geneva, Zürich	
Czech Republic	1993	Prague	Bern; Honorary consulates: Basel, Zürich, Locarno	
Denmark	1945	Copenhagen (Note: Before 1945: Swiss Legation in Stockholm (Sweden); 1945–1957: Swiss Legation in Copenhagen.)	Bern	Main article: Denmark – Switzerland relations
Estonia	1938, 1991 (Note: Switzerland recognised Estonia on 22 April 1922, and diplomatic relations started in 1938. Switzerland never recognised the annexation of Estonia by the Soviet Union and re-recognised Estonia on 28 August 1991. Diplomatic relations were restored on 4 September 1991.)	Riga (Latvia); Consulate General: Tallinn	Vienna (Austria); Honorary consulate: Zürich	
Finland	1926 (Note: Switzerland acknowledged Finland on 11 January 1918. Diplomatic relations between them were established on 29 January 1926.)	Helsinki	Bern; Honorary Consulate General: Zürich; Honorary consulates: Basel, Geneva, Lausanne, Lugano, Lucerne	
France	1430 (Note: Permanent since 1522.)	Paris; Consulates General: Bordeaux, Lyon, Marseille, Strasbourg	Bern; Consulates General: Geneva, Zürich	573 km of common borders.
Germany	1871	Berlin; Consulates General: Frankfurt, Munich, Stuttgart	Bern; Consulate General: Geneva	334 km of common border.
Greece	1830	Athens; Consulates: Thessaloniki, Corfu, Patras, Rhodes	Bern; Consulate General Geneva; Honorary consulates: Zürich, Lugano	Main article: Greece–Switzerland relations
Hungary		Budapest	Bern; Honorary consulates: Geneva, Zürich, 2 in Zug	See also Hungarian diaspora. (Note: There are between 20,000 and 25,000 Hungarians who live in Switzerland; most of them came after the Hungarian Revolution of 1956.)
Ireland	1922	Dublin	Bern; Honorary consulate: Zürich	
Italy	1868	Rome; Consulates General: Genoa, Milan; Honorary consulates: Bari, Bergamo, Bologna, Cagliari, Catania, Florence, Naples, Padua, Reggio Calabria, Trieste, Turin, Venice	Bern; Consulates General: Basel, Geneva, Lugano, Zürich; Consulate: St. Gallen	740 km of common borders.
Latvia	1921, 1991 (Note: Switzerland recognised the Latvian state on 23 April 1921. Switzerland never recognised the incorporation of Latvia into the USSR. Both countries renewed their diplomatic relations on 4 September 1991.)	Riga	Vienna (Austria); Honorary consulate: Zürich	
Lithuania	1921, 1991	Riga (Latvia)	Consulate: Geneva; Honorary consulates: Geneva, Lugano	
Luxembourg	1938	Luxembourg	Bern; Consulates: Basel, Chiasso, Geneva, Zürich	
Malta	1937	Honorary Consulate General: Valletta (Note: Honorary consulate since 1937; upgraded 2003.)	Rome (Italy); Honorary consulates: Lugano, Zürich	
Netherlands	1917	The Hague; Consulates General: Amsterdam, Rotterdam; Honorary consulates: San Nicolaas (Aruba), Willemstad (Curaçao)	Bern; Consulates General: Geneva, Zürich; Honorary consulates: Basel, Lugano	Before 1917, through London.
Poland		Warsaw	Bern	
Portugal	1855	Lisbon	Bern; Consulates General: Zürich, Le Grand-Saconnex; Consulates: Lugano, Sion	
Romania	1911, 1962 (Note: Legacies since 1911. Embassies since 24 December 1962.)	Bucharest	Bern	
Slovakia	1993	Bratislava	Bern; Honorary consulate: Zürich	
Slovenia	1992	Ljubljana (Note: Since 2001.)	Bern	
Spain	Middle Ages (by 1513)	Madrid	Bern; Consulates General: Geneva, Zürich	
Sweden	1887	Stockholm	Bern; Consulates General: Basel, Lausanne; Consulates: Geneva, Lugano, Zürich	

== See also ==
- Enlargement of the European Union
  - Potential enlargement of the European Union
- Enlargement of Switzerland
- Liechtenstein–Switzerland relations
- Foreign relations of Switzerland
- German immigration to Switzerland
- Italian immigration to Switzerland
- Schengen Area
- Borders with EU members
  - Austria–Switzerland border
  - France–Switzerland border
  - Germany–Switzerland border
  - Italy–Switzerland border
