= Campaign for an Independent and Neutral Switzerland =

Swiss political organisation

- AUNS logo
- Abbreviation: AUNS
- Formation: June 19, 1986
- Founders: Christoph Blocher; Otto Fischer
- Type: Voluntary association
- Purpose: Swiss neutrality Euroscepticism; Direct democracy
- Location: Switzerland
- Members: 30,100 members (2014)
- President: Lukas Reimann
- Website: auns.ch

The Campaign for an Independent and Neutral Switzerland (German: Aktion für eine unabhängige und neutrale Schweiz or AUNS, French: Action pour une Suisse indépendante et neutre or ASIN, Italian: Azione per una Svizzera neutrale e indipendente or ASNI), abbreviated to AUNS, is a political organisation in Switzerland that supports Swiss independence and neutrality.

== History ==
The AUNS was founded on June 19, 1986, formed out of the Committee Against UN Membership (German: Aktionskomitee gegen den UNO-Beitritt), shortly after a referendum on UN membership was defeated. Its founders were Christoph Blocher of the SVP and Otto Fischer of the FDP.

Throughout its history, the AUNS has had some success. It successfully opposed referendums on abolishing the military (1989 & 2001), joining the European Economic Area (1992), joining the EU (2001), as well as numerous other referendums. Additionally, the AUNS supported the immigration referendum of 2014, which was narrowly accepted.

On the other hand, its campaigns against the participation of the Swiss Army in armed UN peace-keeping missions (2001), against Swiss succession to the UN (2002), against the bilateral treaties with the European Union (Bilaterale I (2000), Bilaterale II (2004), right to move directive (2004), Schengen treaty (2005)) and against payment of a billion Swiss Francs to the EU Cohesion Fund (2005) were unsuccessful.

As of 2014, the AUNS had 30,100 members, down from 45,000 at the end of 2004. Since April 2014, Lukas Reimann has been the president of AUNS, taking over from Pirmin Schwander.

== Organization ==
While the AUNS describes itself as a non-partisan organization, it has been closely associated with the Swiss People's Party (SVP). It was presided by notable SVP member Christoph Blocher from 1986 to 2003, and is strongly associated with Blocher's rise to a dominating figure in Swiss politics and the rise of right-wing populism orchestrated by SVP campaigns in the 1990s and 2000s.

The AUNS has a youth wing called Youth for an Independent and Neutral Switzerland or JUNS.

== Views ==
According to its website, the AUNS supports Swiss independence, neutrality, and direct democracy. The AUNS stands in opposition to EU membership and NATO membership, involvement of the Swiss military abroad, as well as any loss of Swiss sovereignty.

On its website, the AUNS explicitly distances itself from racism, antisemitism and neo-Nazism, arguing that their ideology is the direct opposite of National Socialism which aimed at an "empire as dictatorship" while their own ideal is "independence, neutrality and direct democracy in Switzerland."

== Presidents ==
- Christoph Blocher (1986–2003)
- Pirmin Schwander (2004–2014)
- Lukas Reimann (2014–present)

== See also ==
- Switzerland–European Union relations
