= Lukas Reimann =

Swiss politician (born 1982)

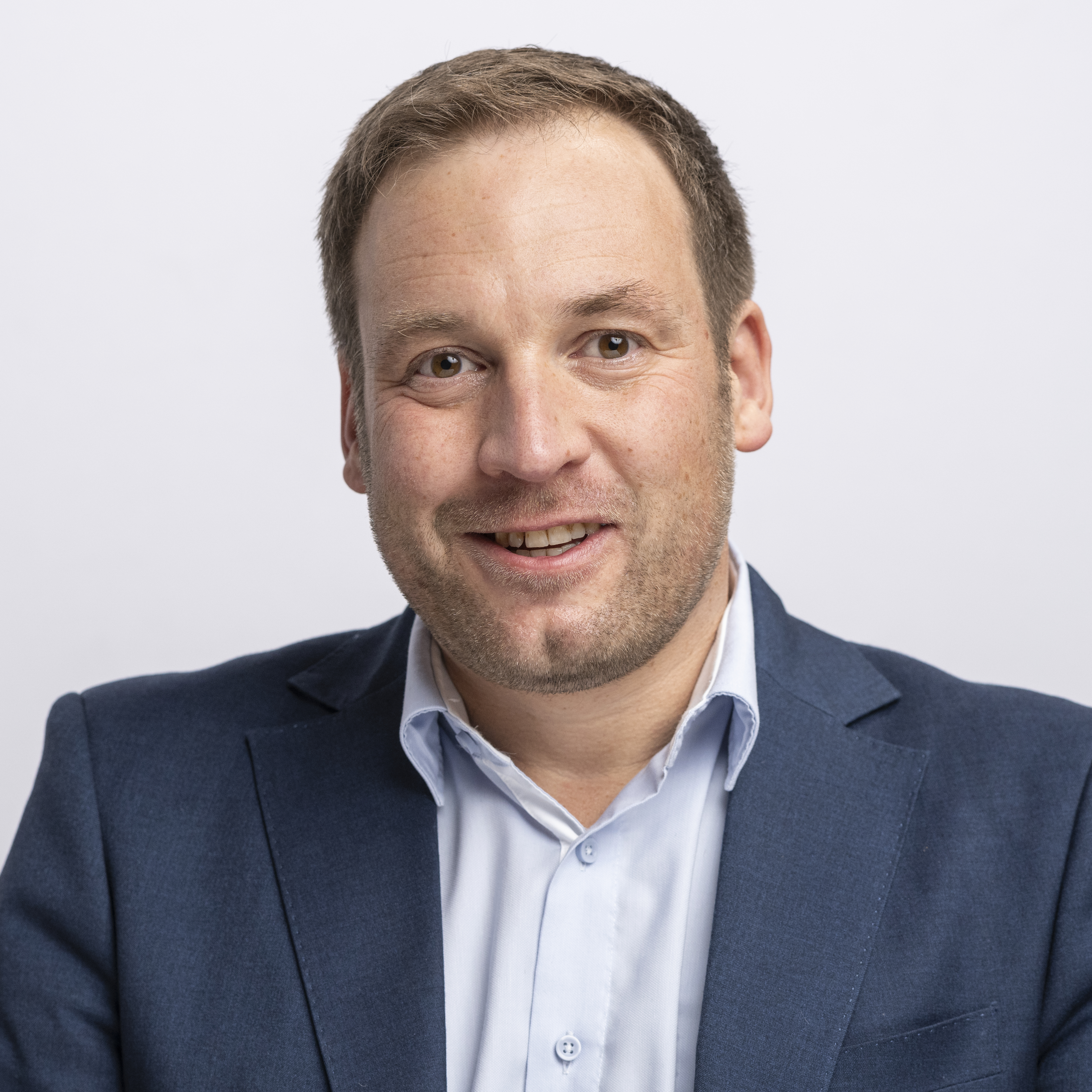
- Official portrait, 2023

Member of the National Council
- Incumbent
- Assumed office 3 December 2007
- Constituency: St. Gallen

Personal details
- Born: 18 September 1982 (age 43) Aarau, Switzerland
- Party: Swiss People's Party

Lukas Reimann (born 18 September 1982) is a Swiss politician. Reimann is a member of the Swiss People's Party (SVP) and a National Council. He resides in Wil in the Canton St. Gallen.

== Biography ==
In 2004, at the age of 21 years, Reimann was elected to the Council of States (Kantonsrat) for the Canton of St. Gallen. At the 2007 federal elections, he was elected to the National Council, and at the age of 25, he was at the time the youngest MP in the federal parliament.

A fluent speaker of English, Reimann stood out early for fighting for a 2009 citizen's initiative with the aim to prohibit minarets in Switzerland. He has stated that for him "Islam does not belong to Switzerland", and he participated in the international counter-jihad conference in Zurich in 2010. Reimann himself rates his own positions as radical-libertarian.

Reimann became the president of the Campaign for an Independent and Neutral Switzerland in April 2014, after the last president, Pirmin Schwander stepped down for health reasons.

In 2016, Reimann submitted a motion that would have withdrawn Switzerland's application for EU membership that was suspended in 1992. In March 2016, the National Council accepted Reimann's motion and voted to withdraw the application. The motion was passed by the Council of States and then by the Federal Council in June.
