= European Free Trade Association =

Regional trade organisation and free trade area

(in official languages)
German	Europäische Freihandelsassoziation
French	Association européenne de libre-échange
Icelandic	Fríverslunarsamtök Evrópu
Italian	Associazione europea di libero scambio
Norwegian	Det europeiske frihandelsforbund
Romansh	Associaziun europeica da commerzi liber
Northern Sami	Eurohppá friddjagávpelihttu
- Logo

- Location of the EFTA (green) in Europe (green & dark grey)
- Secretariat: Geneva; Brussels; Luxembourg City; 46°57′N 7°27′E
- Largest city: Oslo; 59°56′N 10°41′E
- Official working language: English
- Official languages of member states: 7 languages: French; German; Icelandic; Italian; Norwegian; Romansh; Sámi
- Type: Regional organisation, Free-trade area
- Member states: Iceland; Liechtenstein; Norway; Switzerland

Leaders
  - Secretary General: Kurt Jaeger
  - Council Chair: Iceland

Establishment
  - Convention signed: 4 January 1960
  - Established: 3 May 1960

Area
  - Total: 528,618 km^{2} (204,101 sq mi)

Population
  - 2025 estimate: 15,073,574
  - Density: 28.5/km^{2} (73.8/sq mi)
- GDP (PPP): 2024 estimate
  - Total: $1.0 trillion
  - Per capita: $108,000
- GDP (nominal): 2024 estimate
  - Total: $1.33 trillion
  - Per capita: $108,000
- Currency: Króna (ISK); Krone (NOK); Franc (CHF)
- Time zone: WET (UTC); CET (UTC+1)
  - Summer (DST): UTC+2 (CEST)
- Note: Iceland observes WET all year, while Liechtenstein, Norway and Switzerland observe CET and CEST.
- Website efta.int

The European Free Trade Association (EFTA) is a regional trade organisation and free trade area consisting of four European states: Iceland, Liechtenstein, Norway and Switzerland. The organisation operates in parallel with the European Union (EU), and all four member states participate in the European single market and are part of the Schengen Area. They are not, however, party to the European Union Customs Union.

The EFTA was historically one of the two dominant western European trade blocs, but is now much smaller and closely associated with its historical competitor, the EU. It was established on 3 May 1960 to serve as an alternative trade bloc for those European states that were unable or unwilling to join the then European Economic Community (EEC), the main predecessor of the EU. The Stockholm Convention (1960), to establish the EFTA, was signed on 4 January 1960 in the Swedish capital by seven countries (known as the "Outer Seven": Austria, Denmark, Norway, Portugal, Sweden, Switzerland and the United Kingdom). A revised Convention, the Vaduz Convention, was signed on 21 June 2001 and entered into force on 1 June 2002.

After 1995 only two founding members remained, namely Norway and Switzerland. The other five, Austria, Denmark, Portugal, Sweden and the United Kingdom, had joined the EU at some point in the intervening years. The initial Stockholm Convention was superseded by the Vaduz Convention, which aimed to provide a successful framework for continuing the expansion and liberalisation of trade, both among the organisation's member states and with the rest of the world.

While the EFTA is not a customs union and member states have full rights to enter into bilateral third-country trade arrangements, it does have a coordinated trade policy. As a result, its member states have jointly concluded free trade agreements with the EU and a number of other countries. To participate in the EU's single market, Iceland, Liechtenstein, and Norway are parties to the Agreement on a European Economic Area (EEA), with compliances regulated by the EFTA Surveillance Authority and the EFTA Court. Switzerland has a set of multilateral agreements with the EU and its member states instead.

== Membership ==
=== History ===
EFTA member states Former members, which left to join the EU Rest of EU member states

On 12 January 1960, the Convention establishing the European Free Trade Association was initiated in the Golden Hall of the Stockholm City Hall. This established the progressive elimination of customs duties on industrial products, but did not affect agricultural or fisheries products.

The main difference between the early EEC and the EFTA was that the latter did not operate common external customs tariffs unlike the former: each EFTA member was free to establish its individual customs duties against, or its individual free trade agreements with, non-EFTA countries.

The founding members of the EFTA were: Austria, Denmark, Norway, Portugal, Sweden, Switzerland and the United Kingdom. During the 1960s, these countries were often referred to as the "Outer Seven", as opposed to the Inner Six of the then European Economic Community (EEC).

Finland became an associate member in 1961 and a full member in 1986, and Iceland joined in 1970. The United Kingdom and Denmark joined the EEC in 1973 and hence ceased to be EFTA members. Portugal also left the EFTA for the European Community in 1986. Liechtenstein joined the EFTA in 1991 (previously its interests had been represented by Switzerland). Austria, Sweden, and Finland joined the EU in 1995 and thus ceased to be EFTA members.

Twice, in 1972 and in 1994, the Norwegian government attempted to join the EU (still the EEC, in 1973) and by doing so, leave the EFTA. However, both the times membership of the EU was rejected in national referendums, keeping Norway in the EFTA. Iceland applied for EU membership in 2009 due to the 2008–2011 Icelandic financial crisis, but its bid was subsequently suspended. A referendum to resume negotiations took place on 29 August 2026, which was rejected.

=== Current members ===
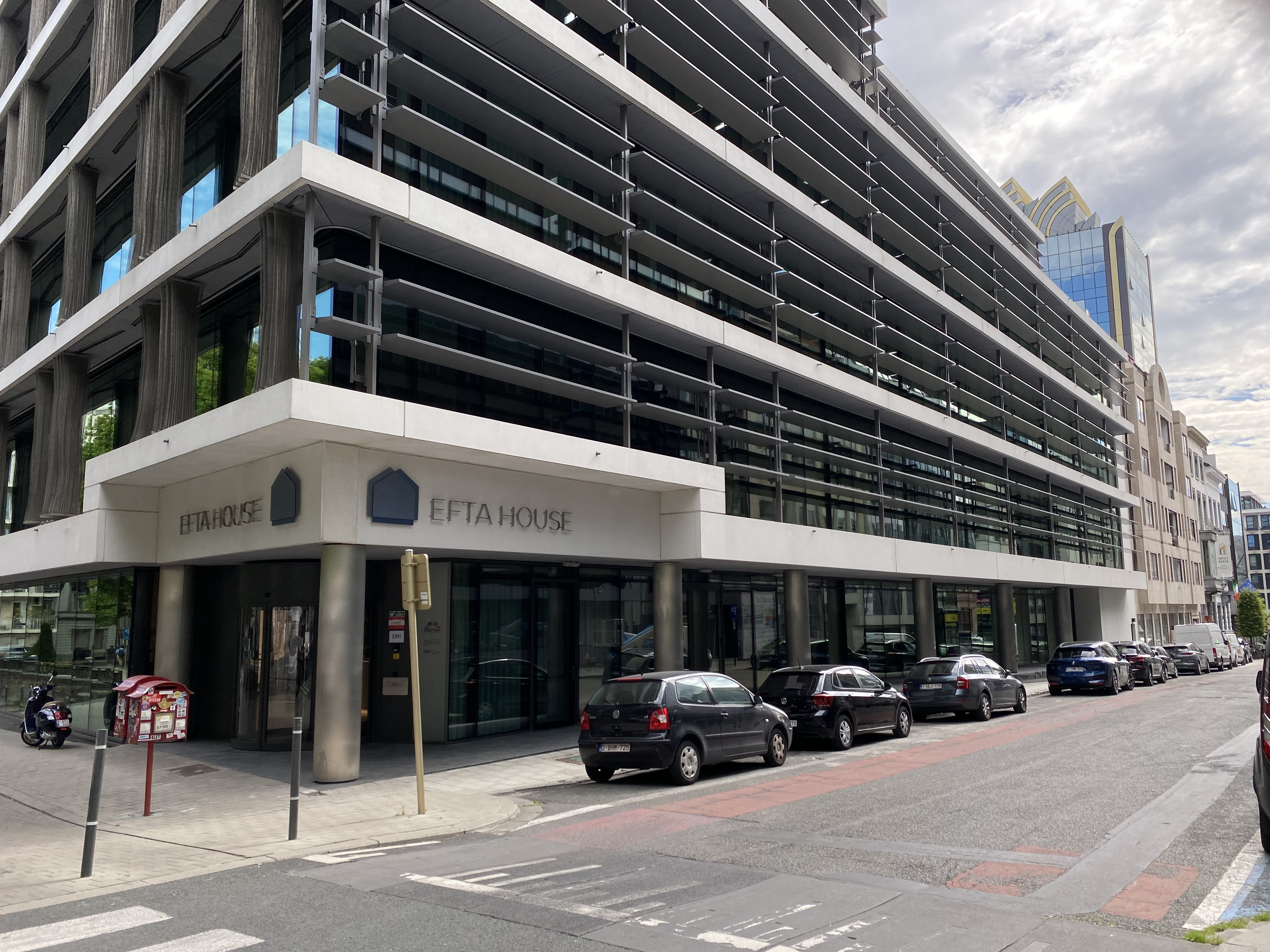
EFTA House in Brussels, 2022

Contracting party	Accession	Population (2021)	Area (km^{2})	Capital	GDP in millions (PPP)	GDP per capita (PPP)
Iceland	1 January 1970	370,335	103,000	Reykjavík	31,763	80,470
Liechtenstein	1 September 1991	39,039	160.4	Vaduz	8,180	201,110
Norway	3 May 1960	5,403,021	385,155	Oslo	606,590	106,690
Switzerland	3 May 1960	8,691,406	41,285	Bern	881,083	97,660

=== Former members ===
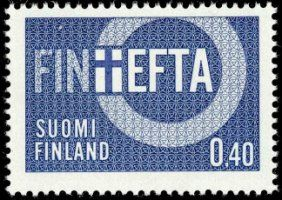
Finnish post stamp about the trade union concluded between Finland and EFTA, or the formerly so-called FINEFTA agreement

State	Accession	Left EFTA	Joined EEC/EU
Austria	3 May 1960	31 December 1994	1 January 1995
Denmark	3 May 1960	31 December 1972	1 January 1973
Finland	1 January 1986	31 December 1994	1 January 1995
Portugal	3 May 1960	31 December 1985	1 January 1986
Sweden	3 May 1960	31 December 1994	1 January 1995
United Kingdom	3 May 1960	31 December 1972	1 January 1973 (withdrew 31 January 2020)

=== Other negotiations ===
Members of the European Union (blue) and EFTA (green)

Between 1994 and 2011, EFTA memberships for Andorra, San Marino, Monaco, the Isle of Man, Turkey, Israel, Morocco, and other European Neighbourhood Policy partners were discussed.

==== Andorra, Monaco, and San Marino ====
In November 2012, after the Council of the European Union had called for an evaluation of the EU's relations with Andorra, Monaco, and San Marino, which they described as "fragmented", the European Commission published a report outlining the options for their further integration into the EU. Unlike Liechtenstein, which is a member of the EEA via the EFTA and the Schengen Agreement, relations with these three states are based on a collection of agreements covering specific issues. The report examined four alternatives to the current situation:

1. A Sectoral Approach with separate agreements with each state covering an entire policy area.
2. A comprehensive, multilateral Framework Association Agreement (FAA) with the three states.
3. EEA membership, and
4. EU membership.

However, the Commission argued that the sectoral approach did not address the major issues and was still needlessly complicated, while EU membership was dismissed in the near future because "the EU institutions are currently not adapted to the accession of such small-sized countries". The remaining options, EEA membership and a FAA with the states, were found to be viable and were recommended by the commission. In response, the Council requested that negotiations with the three microstates on further integration continue, and that a report be prepared by the end of 2013 detailing the implications of the two viable alternatives and recommendations on how to proceed.

As EEA membership is currently only open to EFTA or EU member states, the consent of existing EFTA member states is required for the microstates to join the EEA without becoming members of the EU. In 2011, Jonas Gahr Støre, then Foreign Minister of Norway which is an EFTA member state, said that EFTA/EEA membership for the microstates was not the appropriate mechanism for their integration into the internal market due to their different requirements from those of larger countries such as Norway, and suggested that a simplified association would be better suited for them. Espen Barth Eide, Støre's successor, responded to the commission's report in late 2012 by questioning whether the microstates have sufficient administrative capabilities to meet the obligations of EEA membership. However, he stated that Norway would be open to the possibility of EFTA membership for the microstates if they decided to submit an application, and that the country had not made a final decision on the matter. Pascal Schafhauser, the Counsellor of the Liechtenstein Mission to the EU, said that Liechtenstein, another EFTA member state, was willing to discuss EEA membership for the microstates provided their joining did not impede the functioning of the organisation. However, he suggested that the option of direct membership in the EEA for the microstates, outside of both the EFTA and the EU, should be considered. On 18 November 2013, the EU Commission concluded that "the participation of the small-sized countries in the EEA is not judged to be a viable option at present due to the political and institutional reasons", and that Association Agreements were a more feasible mechanism to integrate the microstates into the internal market.

==== Norway ====
The Norwegian electorate had rejected treaties of accession to the EU in two referendums. At the time of the first referendum in 1972, their neighbour, Denmark joined. Since the second referendum in 1994, two other Nordic neighbours, Sweden and Finland, have joined the EU. The last two governments of Norway have not advanced the question, as they have both been coalition governments consisting of proponents and opponents of EU membership.

==== Switzerland ====
Since Switzerland rejected the EEA membership in a referendum in 1992, more referendums on EU membership have been initiated, the last time being in 2001. These were all rejected. Switzerland has been in a customs union with fellow EFTA member state and neighbour Liechtenstein since 1924.

==== Iceland ====
On 16 July 2009, the government of Iceland formally applied for EU membership, but the negotiation process was suspended in mid-2013, and in 2015 the foreign ministers wrote to withdraw its application. A referendum to reopen negotiations held on 29 August 2026 was defeated.

==== Faroe Islands (Kingdom of Denmark) ====
Denmark was a founding member of the EFTA in 1960, but its membership ended in 1973, when it joined the European Communities. The autonomous territories of the Kingdom of Denmark were covered by Denmark's EFTA membership: Greenland from 1961 and the Faroe Islands from 1968. In mid-2005, representatives of the Faroe Islands raised the possibility of their territory re-joining the EFTA. Because Article 56 of the EFTA Convention only allows sovereign states to become members of the EFTA, the Faroes considered the possibility that the "Kingdom of Denmark in respect of the Faroes" could join the EFTA on their behalf. The Danish Government has stated that this mechanism would not allow the Faroes to become a member of the EEA because Denmark was already a party to the EEA Agreement.

The Faroes already have an extensive bilateral free trade agreement with Iceland, known as the Hoyvík Agreement.

==== United Kingdom ====
The United Kingdom was a co-founder of the EFTA in 1960, but ceased to be a member upon joining the European Economic Community. The country held a referendum in 2016 on withdrawing from the EU (popularly referred to as "Brexit"), resulting in a 51.9% vote in favour of withdrawing. A 2013 research paper presented to the Parliament of the United Kingdom proposed a number of alternatives to EU membership which would continue to allow it access to the EU's internal market, including continuing EEA membership as an EFTA member state, or the Swiss model of a number of bilateral treaties covering the provisions of the single market.

In the first meeting since the Brexit vote, the EFTA reacted by saying both that they were open to a UK return, and that Britain has many issues to work through. The president of Switzerland Johann Schneider-Ammann stated that its return would strengthen the association. However, in August 2016 the Norwegian Government expressed reservations. Norway's European affairs minister, Elisabeth Vik Aspaker, told the Aftenposten newspaper: "It's not certain that it would be a good idea to let a big country into this organization. It would shift the balance, which is not necessarily in Norway's interests."

In late 2016, the Scottish First Minister Nicola Sturgeon said that her priority was to keep the whole of the UK in the European single market but that taking Scotland alone into the EEA was an option being "looked at". However, other EFTA states have stated that only sovereign states are eligible for membership, so it could only join if it became independent from the UK, unless the solution scouted for the Faroes in 2005 were to be adopted (see above).

In early 2018, British MPs Antoinette Sandbach, Stephen Kinnock and Stephen Hammond called for the UK to rejoin the EFTA.

== Relationship with the European Union: the European Economic Area ==
In 1992, the EU, its member states, and the EFTA member states signed the Agreement on the European Economic Area in Porto, Portugal. However, the proposal that Switzerland ratify its participation was rejected by referendum. (Nevertheless, Switzerland has multiple bilateral treaties with the EU that allow it to participate in the European Single Market, the Schengen Agreement and other programmes). Thus, except for Switzerland, the EFTA members are also members of the European Economic Area (EEA). The EEA comprises three member states of the EFTA and 27 member states of the European Union (EU). It was established on 1 January 1994 following an agreement with the European Economic Community (which had become the European Community two months earlier). It allows the EFTA-EEA states to participate in the EU's Internal Market without being members of the EU. They adopt almost all EU legislation related to the single market, except laws on agriculture and fisheries. However, they also contribute to and influence the formation of new EEA relevant policies and legislation at an early stage as part of a formal decision-shaping process. One EFTA member, Switzerland, has not joined the EEA but has a series of bilateral agreements, including a free trade agreement, with the EU.

The following table summarises the various components of EU laws applied in the EFTA countries and their sovereign territories. Some territories of EU member states also have a special status in regard to EU laws applied as is the case with some European microstates.

EFTA member states and territories	Application of EU law	EURATOM	European Defence Agency	Schengen area	EU VAT area	EU Customs Union	EU single market	Eurozone
Iceland	Partial	No	No	Yes	No	No	With exemptions, in EEA	No, ISK
Liechtenstein	Partial	No	No	Yes	No, Swiss–Liechtenstein VAT area	No, Swiss–Liechtenstein customs territory	With exemptions, in EEA	No, CHF
Norway, except:	Partial	No	Participating non‑member state	Yes	No	No	With exemptions, in EEA	No, NOK
Jan Mayen	Partial	No	Participating	Yes	No, VAT free	No	With exemptions, in EEA	No, NOK
Svalbard	No	No	Demilitarised	No	No, VAT free	No	No	No, NOK
Bouvet Island	No	No	Participating	No	No	No	No	No, NOK
Peter I Island	No	No	Demilitarised	No	No	No	No	No, NOK
Queen Maud Land	No	No	Demilitarised	No	No	No	No	No, NOK
Switzerland, except:	Partial	Participating associated state	No	Yes	No, Swiss–Liechtenstein VAT area	No, Swiss–Liechtenstein customs territory	With exemptions, sectoral agreements (Note: Through multiple sectoral agreements)	No, CHF
Samnaun	Partial	Participating with Switzerland	No	Yes	No, VAT free	No, Swiss–Liechtenstein customs territory	With exemptions, sectoral agreements	No, CHF

A clickable Euler diagram showing the relationships between various European regional organisations

=== EEA institutions ===
A Joint Committee consisting of the EEA-EFTA States plus the European Commission (representing the EU) has the function of extending relevant EU law to the non-EU members. An EEA Council meets twice yearly to govern the overall relationship between the EEA members.

Rather than setting up pan-EEA institutions, the activities of the EEA are regulated by the EFTA Surveillance Authority and the EFTA Court. The EFTA Surveillance Authority and the EFTA Court regulate the activities of the EFTA members in respect of their obligations in the European Economic Area (EEA). Since Switzerland is not an EEA member, it does not participate in these institutions.

The EFTA Surveillance Authority performs a role for EFTA members that is equivalent to that of the European Commission for the EU, as "guardian of the treaties" and the EFTA Court performs the European Court of Justice-equivalent role.

The original plan for the EEA lacked the EFTA Court: the European Court of Justice was to exercise those roles. However, during the negotiations for the EEA agreement, the European Court of Justice ruled by the Opinion 1/91 that it would be a violation of the treaties to give to the EU institutions these powers with respect to non-EU member states. Therefore, the current arrangement was developed instead.

=== EEA and Norway Grants ===
The EEA and Norway Grants are the financial contributions of Iceland, Liechtenstein and Norway to reduce social and economic disparities in Europe. They were established in conjunction with the 2004 enlargement of the European Economic Area (EEA), which brought together the EU, Iceland, Liechtenstein and Norway in the Internal Market. In the period from 2004 to 2009, €1.3 billion of project funding was made available for project funding in the 15 beneficiary states in Central and Southern Europe. The EEA and Norway Grants are administered by the Financial Mechanism Office, which is affiliated to the EFTA Secretariat in Brussels.

== Relationships with national organisations ==
EFTA's Consultative Committee provides a forum through which EFTA can consult with the trade unions and employers' organisations of the four member states. EFTA seeks national input through the committee on the social and economic impact of policies such as the single market.

== International conventions ==
EFTA also originated the Hallmarking Convention and the Pharmaceutical Inspection Convention, both of which are open to non-EFTA states.

== International trade relations ==
Map of free trade agreements between EFTA and other countries: EFTA Free trade agreement Ongoing free trade negotiation European Economic Area Declaration on cooperation or dialogue on closer trade relations

EFTA has 31 free trade agreements with non-EU countries as well as declarations on cooperation and joint workgroups to improve trade. Currently, the EFTA States have established preferential trade relations with 41 states and territories, in addition to the 27 member states of the European Union.

EFTA's interactive Free Trade Map gives an overview of the partners worldwide.

=== Free trade agreements ===
Nation (s)	No of nations represented	Signed	Effective	Coverage	Ref.
Albania	1	17 December 2009	1 November 2010	Goods	
Bosnia and Herzegovina	1	24 June 2013	1 January 2015	Goods	
Canada	1	26 January 2008	1 July 2009	Goods	
Central America; Costa Rica; Panama	4	24 June 2013	19 August 2014	Goods & Services	
Chile	1	26 June 2003	1 December 2004	Goods & Services	
Colombia	1	25 November 2008	1 July 2011	Goods & Services	
Ecuador	1	25 June 2018	1 November 2020	Goods & Services	
Egypt	1	27 January 2007	1 August 2007	Goods	
Georgia	1	27 June 2016	1 September 2017	Goods & Services	
Gulf Cooperation Council; Bahrain; Kuwait; Oman; Qatar; Saudi Arabia; United Arab Emirates	6	22 June 2009	1 July 2014	Goods & Services	
Hong Kong	1	21 June 2011	1 October 2012	Goods & Services	
India	1	10 March 2024	1 October 2025	Goods & Services	
Indonesia	1	16 December 2018	1 November 2021	Goods & Services	
Israel	1	17 September 1992	1 January 1993	Goods	
Jordan	1	21 June 2001	1 September 2002	Goods	
Kosovo	1	22 January 2025	1 October 2026	Goods and services	
Lebanon	1	24 June 2004	1 July 2007	Goods	
Mexico	1	27 November 2000	1 July 2001	Goods	
Moldova	1	27 June 2023	1 September 2024	Goods & Services	
Montenegro	1	14 November 2011	1 September 2012	Goods	
Morocco (Note: Excluding Western Sahara)	1	19 June 1997	1 December 1999	Goods	
North Macedonia	1	19 June 2000	1 May 2002	Goods	
Palestinian Authority	1	30 November 1998	1 July 1999	Goods	
Peru	1	24 June 2010	1 July 2011	Goods	
Philippines	1	28 April 2016	1 June 2018	Goods & Services	
Serbia	1	17 December 2009	1 October 2010	Goods	
Singapore	1	26 June 2002	1 January 2003	Goods & Services	
South Korea	1	15 December 2005	1 September 2006	Goods & Services	
Southern African Customs Union; Botswana; Eswatini; Lesotho; Namibia; South Africa	5	26 June 2006	1 May 2008	Goods	
Tunisia	1	17 December 2004	1 August 2005	Goods	
Turkey	1	10 December 1991 (Note: Updated on 25 June 2018)	1 September 1992 (Note: Updated on 1 October 2021)	Goods & Services	
Ukraine	1	24 June 2010	1 June 2012	Goods & Services	

=== Ongoing free trade negotiations ===
Signed:

- Guatemala (Signed 22 June 2015)
- Thailand (Signed 23 January 2025)
- Malaysia (Concluded 11 April 2025, Signed 23 June 2025)
- Mercosur (Concluded 2 July 2025, Signed 16 September 2025)
  - Argentina
  - Brazil
  - Paraguay
  - Uruguay
- Vietnam (Signed 18 October 2026)

Negotiations currently on hold

- Algeria
- Honduras (Central American States)
- Eurasian Economic Union
  - Belarus
  - Kazakhstan
  - Russia

Declarations on cooperation

- Mauritius
- Mongolia
- Myanmar (on hold since 2022)
- Pakistan

=== Obsolete agreements ===
The following agreements are no longer active, being superseded by other agreements:

- Bulgaria (1995–2007)
- Croatia (2002–2013)
- Czech Republic (1993–2004)
- Czechoslovakia (1992–1993)
- Estonia (1996–2004)
- Hungary (1995–2004)
- Latvia (1996–2004)
- Lithuania (1996–2004)
- Poland (1995–2004)
- Romania (1995–2007)
- Slovakia (1993–2004)
- Slovenia (1995–2004)
- Spain (1980–1986)
- Turkey (1995–2021)

== Travel policies ==
=== Free movement of people within EFTA and the EU/EEA ===
EFTA member states' citizens enjoy freedom of movement in each other's territories in accordance with the EFTA convention. EFTA & EEA nationals also enjoy freedom of movement in the European Union (EU). EFTA nationals and EU citizens are not only visa-exempt but are legally entitled to enter and reside in each other's countries. The Citizens' Rights Directive (also sometimes called the "Free Movement Directive") defines the right of free movement for citizens of the European Economic Area (EEA), which includes the three EFTA members Iceland, Norway and Liechtenstein plus the member states of the EU. Switzerland, which is a member of EFTA but not of the EEA, is not bound by the Directive but rather has a separate multilateral agreement on free movement with the EU and its member states.

As a result, a citizen of an EFTA country can live and work in all the other EFTA countries and in all the EU countries, and a citizen of an EU country can live and work in all the EFTA countries (but for voting and working in sensitive fields, such as government / police / military, citizenship is often required, and non-citizens may not have the same rights to welfare and unemployment benefits as citizens).

== General secretaries ==
#	State	Name	Year
1	United Kingdom	Frank Figgures	1960–1965
2	United Kingdom	John Coulson	1965–1972
3	Sweden	Bengt Rabaeus	1972–1975
4	Switzerland	Charles Müller	1976–1981
5	Norway	Per Kleppe	1981–1988
6	Austria	Georg Reisch	1988–1994
7	Iceland	Kjartan Jóhannsson	1994–2000
8	Switzerland	William Rossier	2000–2006
9	Norway	Kåre Bryn	2006–2012
10	Iceland	Kristinn F. Árnason	2012–2018
11	Switzerland	Henri Gétaz	2018–2023
12	Norway	Siri Veseth Meling	2024
13	Liechtenstein	Kurt Jaeger	2024–present

== Portugal Fund ==
The Portugal Fund came into operation in February 1977 when Portugal was still a member of EFTA. It was to provide funding for the development of Portugal after the Carnation Revolution and the consequential restoration of democracy and the decolonisation of the country's overseas possessions. This followed a period of economic sanctions by most of the international community, which left Portugal economically underdeveloped compared to the rest of the western Europe. When Portugal left EFTA in 1985 in order to join the EEC, the remaining EFTA members decided to continue the Portugal Fund so that Portugal would continue to benefit from it. The Fund originally took the form of a low-interest loan from the EFTA member states to the value of US$100 million. Repayment was originally to commence in 1988, however, EFTA then decided to postpone the start of repayments until 1998. The Portugal Fund was dissolved in January 2002.

== See also ==
- EFTA Court
- EFTA Surveillance Authority
- Central European Free Trade Agreement (CEFTA)
- Euro-Mediterranean free trade area (EU-MEFTA)
- European Union Association Agreement
- European Union free trade agreements
- Free trade areas in Europe
