= Austria–Switzerland relations =

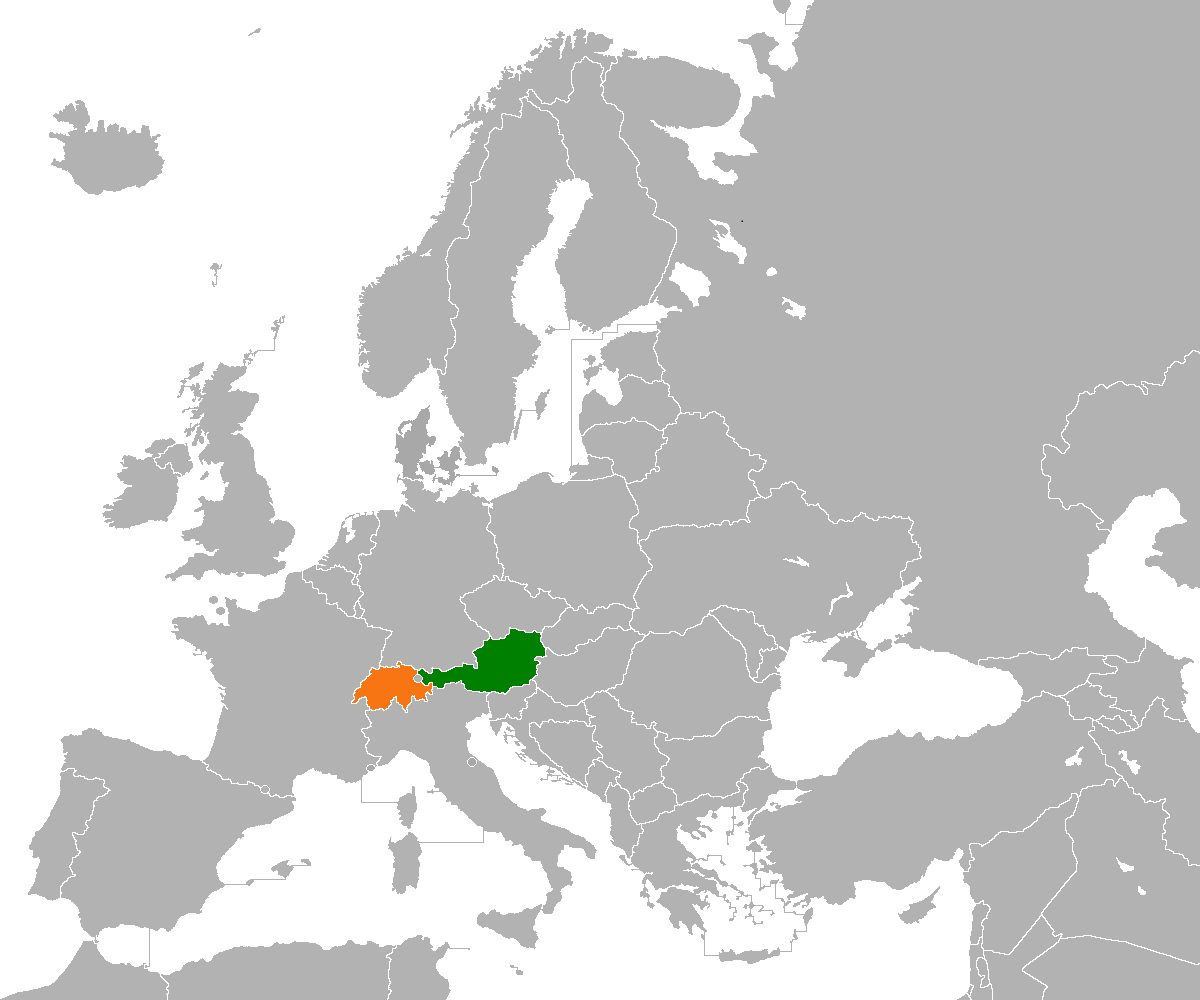
- Austria: Switzerland

Foreign relations exist between the alpine nations of Austria and Switzerland. Both countries have had diplomatic relations since the Middle Ages. The Habsburgs, who ruled Austria for more than six centuries, are originally from Aargau, Switzerland. The two countries are predominantly German-speaking. Austria has an embassy in Bern, a general consulate in Zürich and seven honorary consulates (in Basel, Chur, Geneva, Lausanne, Lugano, Lucerne and St. Gallen). Switzerland has an embassy in Vienna and six honorary consulates (in Bregenz, Graz, Innsbruck, Klagenfurt, Linz, and Salzburg). Together, both countries organized the Euro 2008. Both countries are full members of the Council of Europe, the OSCE, the International Criminal Court, and the United Nations. While Austria is a member of the European Union, Switzerland is not. Neither country has joined NATO, as both maintain a policy of neutrality.

== History ==
Both countries have maintained diplomatic relations since the Middle Ages. The Swiss were able to secure their independence from the House of Habsburg in 1386 by winning the Battle of Sempach, which was followed by a series of other battles during the Swiss-Habsburg Wars for Swiss independence. The Habsburgs, who ruled Austria for more than six centuries, were originally from Aargau, Switzerland, which was conquered by the Swiss in 1415. Because small Switzerland became a Republic early on, while Austria was part of the larger Habsburg monarchy and a major European power for many centuries, the political history of the two countries differed considerably. In the late 18th and early 19th centuries, various agreements occurred that influenced the subsequent demarcation of borders between the two countries. In 1770, the Canton of Zürich acquired the villages of Ramsen and Dörflingen from Austria, which later became part of the Canton of Schaffhausen. With the cession of Fricktal and Tarasp (1803) as well as Rhäzüns (1819), the Habsburgs lost their last possessions in Switzerland.

=== 19th century ===
After the end of the Napoleonic Wars, Austria recognized Switzerland's independence at the Congress of Vienna. However, relations were strained. Switzerland accepted republican refugees, which displeased reactionary Austria under Metternich, for example in the 1820s when numerous persecutes from Turin and Naples found asylum in Switzerland, where Austria had put down uprisings. In 1823, after Austria threatened to invade, Switzerland was forced to adopt a law, which included surveillance of the domestic press and restrictions on the right of asylum. After the start of the Regeneration period in 1830 and the end of the Restoration in Switzerland, Metternich wanted again to launch an attack on Switzerland in 1832, but France and the United Kingdom refused to aid him.

During the Sonderbund War of 1847, Metternich supported the conservative and Catholic camp, and Austria provided 100,000 guilders to the Sonderbund. However, due to the onset of the revolutions of 1848/1849, the Austrians were no longer able to intervene effectively, as other problems had become more pressing. To Austria's displeasure, arms and soldiers reached the Kingdom of Lombardy–Venetia from Switzerland to support the uprising there against Austrian rule. Overall, relations in the first half of the 19th century were mixed, as both sides distrusted each other. There was also little economic exchange, as the road connections between the two countries were hardly developed and a protectionist economic policy was pursued.

The admission of Italian refugees from Milan in 1853 again led to a crisis, and Austria blocked the border with Ticino. The blockade was lifted in 1855. After Austria's defeat in the Austro-Prussian War in 1866, relations became better, partly because there were fears in Switzerland about Prussia after the Neuchâtel Crisis 1856/1857. A postal and trade agreement was concluded between the two states and a dispute over the course of the Swiss border with Tyrol was settled in 1868. Even the assassination of Empress Elisabeth in Geneva by an anarchist in 1898 did not strain relations, as Emperor Franz Joseph I was lenient towards the Swiss. In the second half of the 19th century, with better political relations, economic relations were also significantly intensified and several trade agreements were concluded between the two countries. Projects such as the Gotthard Tunnel also strengthened the economic integration of the Alpine regions.

=== 1900−1945 ===
The dissolution of Austria-Hungary by the Treaty of Saint-Germain (1919) created ambiguities regarding Switzerland's legal relations with German Austria, for example regarding Austria's national debt to the Swiss. Switzerland therefore recognized the First Republic of Austria only on January 9, 1920, which angered the Austrians. In Vorarlberg, the population also demanded annexation to Switzerland in a referendum in 1919, which was rejected by Switzerland because of the change in the linguistic and confessional balance in Switzerland that would have occurred. The numerous disputes between Austria and Switzerland were not settled until 1925 and 1927, respectively, with the conclusion of treaties, so that diplomatic relations normalized.

The rise of Adolf Hitler in Germany caused alarm in Switzerland. After the Austrofascist Engelbert Dollfuß seized power, the political left in Switzerland showed solidarity with the persecuted opposition. Austria's annexation by Nazi Germany in 1938 led to a precarious situation for Switzerland, and thousands of refugees crossed the border into Switzerland. Switzerland then attempted to strengthen its defensive capabilities. However, it was forced to diplomatically recognize the annexation of Austria due to Germany's overwhelming power. After the end of the Second World War, Switzerland provided Austria with humanitarian aid in the form of donations amounting to at least 53.5 million Swiss francs.

=== After the Second World War ===
The Second Republic of Austria was proclaimed on April 27, 1945, and recognized by Switzerland on November 2. Soon after, diplomatic missions were established, and close relations were built even before Austria's sovereignty, strengthened by the aid that the Swiss provided to Austria. In 1955, Austria finally regained its sovereignty and became a neutral state on the model of Switzerland. Austrian neutrality was distinguished by a more active foreign policy during the Cold War, and in 1979 Vienna competed with Bern for the site as the third UN headquarters, with Vienna prevailing. Austria became closely integrated into the European economy and Switzerland also benefited from the post-war boom. A free trade agreement between Switzerland and Austria was established in 1972. Cooperation between the two countries was also very close in other areas, and by 2008 the two countries had concluded more than 80 bilateral agreements.

== Economic relations ==
For Switzerland, Austria is one of the most important trading partners. In 2022, Austria was Switzerland's seventh most important trading partner in terms of trade volume. In 2021, Switzerland was Austria's fourth most important trading partner. In the same year, Austria exported goods worth 8.17 billion euros and in return imported goods worth 9.73 billion euros to Switzerland. On a per capita basis, Switzerland is the largest consumer of Austrian goods and services.

The Austrian state of Vorarlberg, the Swiss cantons of Appenzell Ausserrhoden, Appenzell Innerrhoden, St. Gallen, Schaffhausen, Thurgau and Zürich, the country of Liechtenstein and parts of Southern Germany cooperate as part of the European Bodensee region.

== Resident diplomatic missions ==
- Austria has an embassy in Bern.
- Switzerland has an embassy in Vienna.
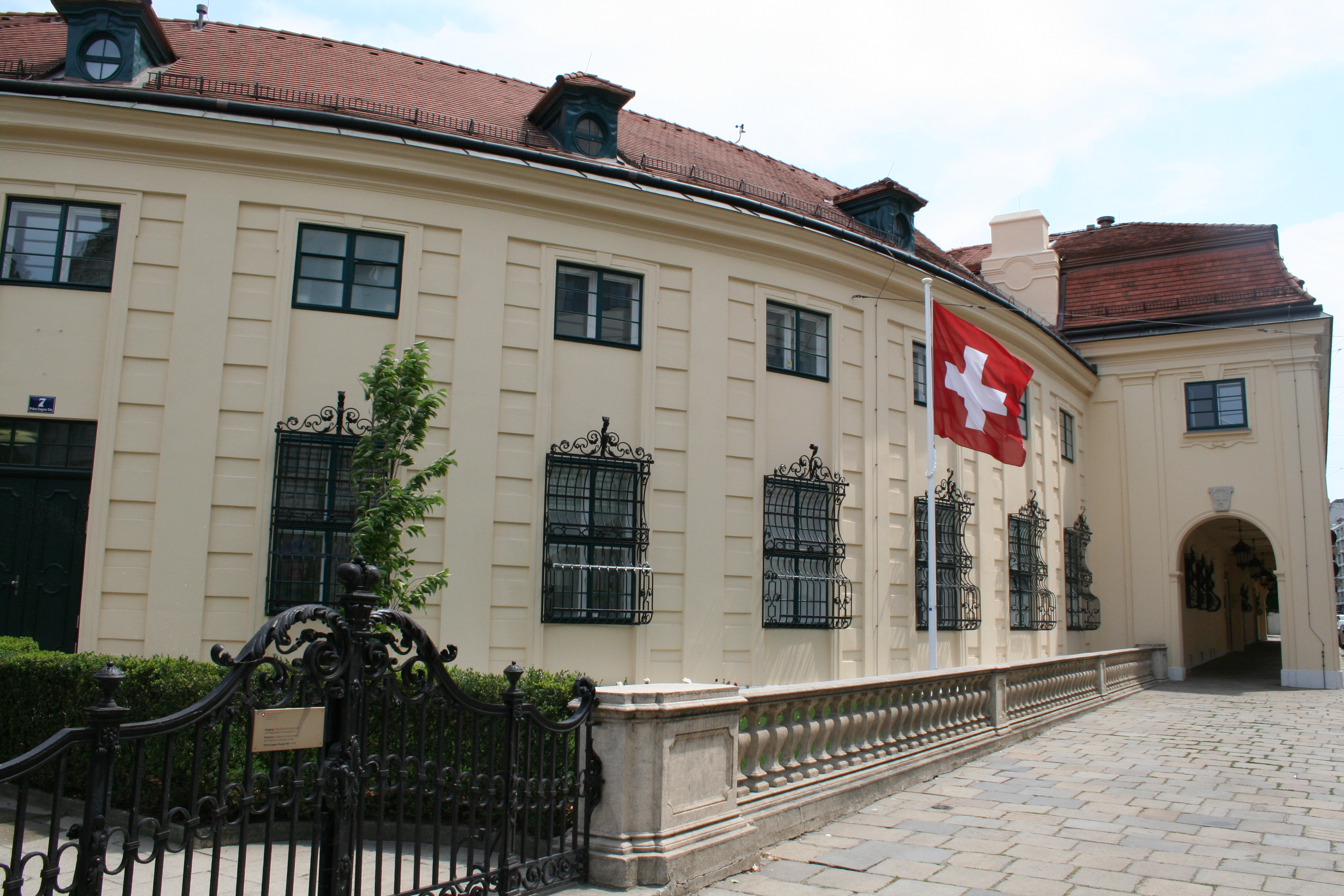
Embassy of Switzerland in Vienna

== See also ==
- Foreign relations of Austria
- Foreign relations of Switzerland
- Austria–Switzerland border
- Switzerland–European Union relations
