= Georg Sparber =

Liechtensteiner diplomat

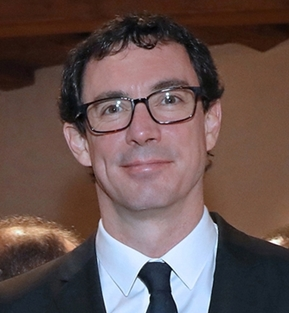

3rd Liechtensteiner Ambassador to the United States
- Incumbent
- Assumed office 2021
- Preceded by: Kurt Jaeger

Personal details
- Born: Liechtenstein
- Spouse: Yvonne
- Children: 5
- Education: University of Lausanne (PhD)

Georg Sparber is a Liechtensteiner diplomat who serves as Liechtenstein's ambassador to the United States and Permanent Observer to the Organization of American States.

== Early life and education ==
Georg Sparber was born in Liechtenstein. He attended University of Lausanne, Sorbonne University and Rutgers University before graduating from the University of Lausanne with a doctorate of philosophy.

== Career ==
Sparber started working for the Office of Foreign Affairs in 2009, and worked at the Permanent Mission of Liechtenstein in New York from 2010 to 2014. He served as the Deputy Head of Mission at the Liechtenstein Embassy in Vienna from 2014 to 2016. He also served as the Deputy Permanent Representative of Liechtenstein to the Organization for Security and Co-operation in Europe.

Sparber became the Deputy Permanent Representative of Liechtenstein to the United Nations in January 2017. During his tenure he supported the self-determination of the Sahrawi people. He became Liechtenstein's ambassador to the United States in 2021.
