= 2005 Swiss referendums =

Five referendums were held in Switzerland during 2005. The first two were held on 5 June on Switzerland joining the Schengen Area and whether registered partnerships for same-sex couples should be introduced. Both questions were approved. The third was held on 25 September on a federal resolution on extending the agreement on free movement of people to new members of the European Union, and was also approved. The final two were held on 27 November on a popular initiative "for food from an agriculture free of genetic modification" and on a labour law related to the opening times of shops in public transport hubs. Both were approved.

== June referendums ==
=== Schengen ===
==== Background ====
In a 1992 referendum Swiss voters rejected membership of the European Economic Area, which had been seen as a stepping stone on the way to membership of the European Union (EU). Polls consistently showed that the Swiss did not want to join the European Union, which was confirmed in a 2001 referendum where over 75% voted against membership. The traditional Swiss policy of avoiding foreign entanglements was also shown by it not joining the United Nations until 2002. Business and political leaders in Switzerland however were concerned over Switzerland being isolated so the Swiss government pursued a policy of bilateral agreements with the European Union. The EU required Switzerland to join the Schengen Agreement in order that other areas of the relationship, such as trade agreements, could continue.

In the referendum the Swiss were asked to decide whether Switzerland should become part of the Schengen and Dublin agreements. If the Schengen agreement was accepted then Switzerland would have to open their borders and end any systematic checks on identity at the borders by 2007. Switzerland would become part of a passport free zone, however customs controls would remain as Switzerland was not a member of the European Union. The agreements would also mean that Switzerland and the European Union would share information on crime and asylum applications. The Dublin agreement would let Switzerland turn away any asylum applicants who had already claimed asylum in another signatory of the agreements. The Swiss government estimated that this would reduce applications by about 20%.

==== Campaign ====
The Swiss government and parliament approved the accession of Switzerland to the agreements in 2003 but the Swiss People's Party collected 86,000 signatures in order to force a referendum on the agreements. The government sold the agreements as a security arrangement which had nothing to do with membership of the European Union. They said that Switzerland was completely surrounded by the European Union and could not solve problems on their own.

Opponents, including the Campaign for an Independent and Neutral Switzerland and the Swiss People's Party, linked the agreements to fears over immigration. They also said that by agreeing to these agreements the government was taking Switzerland closer to European Union membership and that the agreements would give more power to bureaucrats in Brussels.

Opinion polls before the referendum showed about 55% in favour and 35% against, with the rest undecided. As the referendum neared, the polls showed that support was falling, with the rejection of the European constitution in referendums in France and the Netherlands encouraging opponents of the agreements.

==== Results ====
Choice	Votes	%
For	1,477,260	54.6
Against	1,227,042	45.4
Invalid votes	15,710	–
Blank votes	25,255	–
Total	2,745,267	100
Registered voters/turnout	4,836,712	56.8
Source: Nohlen

The results showed about 1.47 million voted in favour of the Schengen agreement which was about 55% of those who voted. Turnout, at 55.9% of voters, was about 10% higher than usual in Swiss referendums. Those Swiss who lived abroad were strongly in favour of joining the Schengen area, while within Switzerland German speakers in eastern Switzerland were mainly against and French speakers in western Switzerland were mainly in favour.

===== Results by canton =====
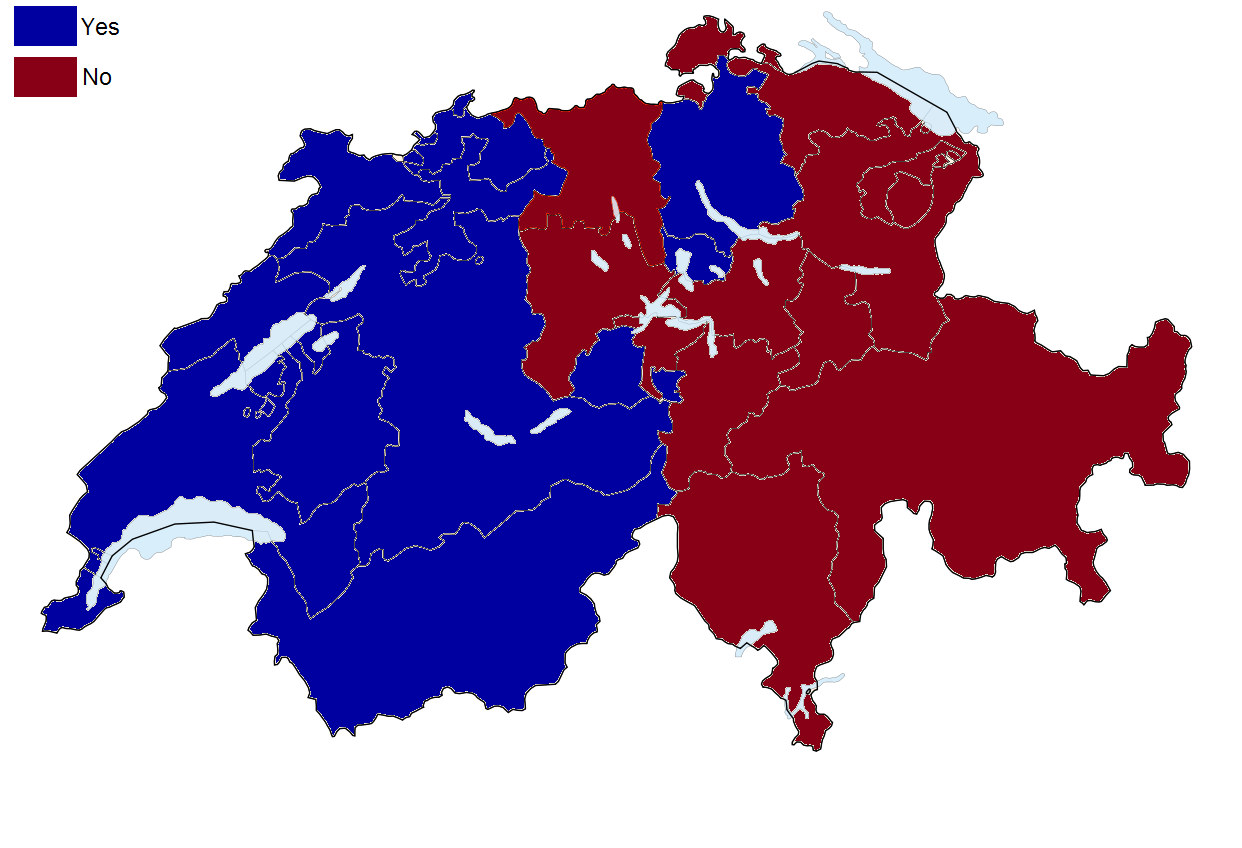
Swiss EU bilateral treaty referendum results by canton Yes-votes No-votes

Canton	Yes	No	Electorate	Votes	Valid votes	Invalid votes
Vaud	144,962	69,643	378,421	217,393	214,605	2,788
Valais	56,407	49,082	192,368	108,198	105,489	2,709
Genève	83,672	49,304	223,612	135,225	132,976	2,249
Bern	201,633	153,062	690,777	358,387	354,695	3,692
Freiburg	54,678	37,526	168,096	93,788	92,204	1,584
Solothurn	49,959	43,559	167,002	94,395	93,518	877
Neuchâtel	44,697	18,307	105,852	63,726	63,004	722
Jura	15,226	9,779	48,632	25,377	25,005	372
Basel-Stadt	45,202	24,765	115,140	70,763	69,967	796
Basel-Landschaft	59,470	42,574	181,146	103,479	102,044	1,435
Aargau	93,323	99,644	369,928	194,078	192,967	1,111
Zürich	280,560	202,580	822,388	492,601	483,140	9,461
Glarus	5,317	8,248	25,037	13,667	13,565	102
Schaffhausen	15,353	17,636	48,203	34,157	32,989	1,168
Appenzell Ausserrhoden	9,976	12,528	36,199	22,686	22,504	182
Appenzell Innerrhoden	1,893	4,119	10,472	6,066	6,012	54
St.Gallen	75,856	85,740	294,030	162,387	161,596	791
Graubünden	29,217	36,228	131,002	66,719	65,445	1,274
Thurgau	36,009	45,124	148,682	83,304	81,133	2,171
Luzern	73,048	74,104	240,825	149,512	147,152	2,360
Uri	5,235	8,285	25,577	13,676	13,520	156
Schwyz	21,135	34,371	91,207	56,958	55,506	1,452
Obwalden	5,706	7,968	23,200	14,173	13,674	499
Nidwalden	7,332	9,844	28,764	17,606	17,176	430
Zug	22,341	19,515	68,641	42,694	41,856	838
Ticino	39,053	63,507	201,511	104,252	102,560	1,692
Source: European Election Database

==== Reactions ====
The government of Switzerland welcomed the results and promised not to ignore opponents of the agreements. The European Commission also welcomed the result of the referendum and described it as an "important step" in Swiss-EU relations. Opponents called on the government to withdraw their application for membership of the European Union. Meanwhile, an upcoming referendum in September on extending the free movement of labour to the 10 newest members of the European Union was seen as likely to be a harder test.

=== Registered partnerships ===
Switzerland was the last republic in Europe to give women the right to vote but in this referendum the Swiss became the first in Europe to hold a referendum on increased rights for same-sex couples. Approval in the referendum would mean that same-sex couples would be able to register their partnerships at civil register offices. These registered partnerships would be legally binding agreements which could only be dissolved in the courts. Same-sex couples would get the same inheritance, pension, social security and tax rights and obligations as heterosexual couples. However they would not get the right to adopt or get fertility treatment.

A leader of the campaign for the approval of registered partnerships estimated that about 5 to 10% of the population were homosexual however the government did not expect a large number of people to register their partnerships. Registered partnerships had already been introduced in the cantons of Fribourg, Geneva, Neuchâtel and Zurich. Parliament approved the introduction of the registered partnerships but conservatives gathered the necessary number of signatures to force a referendum.

The government's opinion was that Switzerland needed registered partnerships as the current situation gave "insufficient legal protection" for such same-sex relationships. Opponents including the Swiss People's Party, Evangelical People's Party and some church groups opposed the introduction of the partnerships as they wanted to keep marriage and the family as a special status. A poll in April showed 66% in favour and 24% against, while another in May had 67% in favour and 24% against.

==== Results ====
The result of the referendum had most cantons in favour of the introduction of the registered partnerships with opposition concentrated mainly in the Roman Catholic central and southern areas of Switzerland.

Choice	Votes	%
For	1,559,848	58.0
Against	1,127,520	42.0
Invalid votes	15,902	–
Blank votes	36,110	–
Total	2,739,380	100
Registered voters/turnout	4,836,712	56.6
Source: Nohlen

== September referendum ==
Choice	Votes	%
For	1,458,686	56.0
Against	1,147,140	44.0
Invalid votes	16,535	–
Blank votes	18,569	–
Total	2,640,930	100
Registered voters/turnout	4,852,272	54.4
Source: Nohlen

== November referendums ==
Question	For		Against		Blank/invalid		Total	Registered voters	Turnout	Cantons for		Cantons against	
Question	Votes	%	Votes	%	Blank	Invalid	Total	Registered voters	Turnout	Full	Half	Full	Half
Popular initiative against genetically modified food	1,125,835	55.7	896,4825	44.3	23,046	11,343	2,056,706	4,859,437	42.3	20	6	0	0
Labour law	1,026,833	50.6	1,003,900	49.4	18,281	11,068	2,060,082	4,859,437	42.4				
Source: Nohlen
