= Kurt Jaeger =

Liechtenstein diplomat (born 1961)

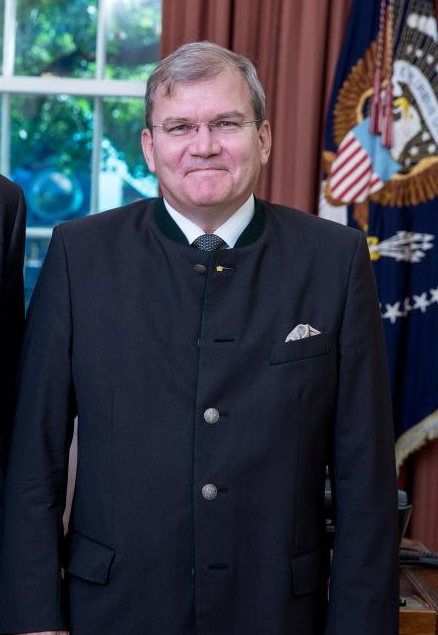

Secretary-General of the European Free Trade Association
- Incumbent
- Assumed office 1 September 2024
- Preceded by: Siri Veseth Meling

2nd Liechtensteiner Ambassador to the United States
- In office 16 September 2016 – 2021
- Preceded by: Claudia Fritsche
- Succeeded by: Georg Sparber

Liechtensteiner Ambassador to Belgium and the European Union
- In office 2010–2016

Personal details
- Born: Kurt Jaeger; 25 November 1961 (age 64) Grabs, Switzerland
- Spouse: Laurette
- Children: 1
- Education: University of Fribourg; McGill University (LL.M.)

Kurt Jaeger (born 25 November 1961) is a Liechtensteiner diplomat currently serving as the Secretary-General of the European Free Trade Association (EFTA) since 2024. He formerly served as Liechtenstein's ambassador to the United States from 2016 to 2021, and as ambassador to Belgium and the European Union from 2010 to 2016.

== Early life ==
Kurt Jaeger was born on 25 November 1961, to Kurt Julius Jaeger in Grabs, Switzerland. From 1973 to 1979, he attended a Jesuit boarding school in Vienna, Austria, and later attended a high school in Disentis, Switzerland from 1979 to 1980, before graduating from a high school in Vaduz, Liechtenstein in 1982.

From 1982 to 1984, he attended the University of St. Gallen. In 1987, he graduated from the University of Fribourg with a law degree. In 1989, he graduated from McGill University with a Master of Laws degree. He married Laurette and had one son with her, Fabian Jaeger.

== Career ==
After graduating from McGill University he worked for Avtec as legal counsel. In 1990, he joined the Swiss Federal Office for Civil Aviation where he enforced international air transport regulation and later served as the executive assistant and general counsel to the director general in 1994.

In 1996, he worked at a private law practice in Vaduz, Liechtenstein. In 1997, he became the secretary to the board of the directors and general counsel to the CEO of Crossair. In 2000, he became the vice president of Atraxis Management Services and later became the vice president for aeropolitical affairs for Swiss International Air Lines in 2001.

=== Diplomacy ===
In 2005, he became a member of the board of the Surveillance Authority (ESA) of the European Free Trade Association representing Liechtenstein.

In 2016, he was appointed to serve as the second ambassador to the United States following the retirement of Claudia Fritsche. He arrived in Washington, D.C. in August and presented his credentials to President Barack Obama on 16 September 2016.
