= 1997 Swiss referendums =

Five referendums were held in Switzerland during 1997. The first three were held on 8 June on two popular initiatives "EU accession talks in front of the people" and "for a ban on arms exports" and a federal resolution on ending the federal monopoly on producing and selling gunpowder. The two popular initiatives were both rejected, whilst the end of the gunpowder monopoly was approved.

The last two were held on 28 September on a federal resolution on financing unemployment insurance and a popular initiative "youth without drugs". Both were rejected by voters.

== Results ==
Month	Question	For		Against		Blank/invalid		Total	Registered voters	Turnout	Cantons for		Cantons against	
Month	Question	Votes	%	Votes	%	Blank	Invalid	Total	Registered voters	Turnout	Full	Half	Full	Half
June	EU accession talks	416,720	25.9	1,189,440	74.1	24,417	4,987	1,635,564	4,614,662	35.4	0	0	20	6
June	Banning arms exports	361,164	22.5	1,243,869	77.5	26,845	4,955	1,636,833	4,614,662	35.5	0	0	20	6
June	Ending the gunpowder monopoly	1,268,162	82.2	275,049	17.8	77,520	6,165	1,626,896	4,614,662	35.3	20	6	0	0
September	Financing unemployment insurance	901,361	49.2	931,457	50.8	37,703	6,101	1,876,622	4,620,084	40.6				
September	Youth without drugs initiative	545,713	29.3	1,314,060	70.7	20,248	6,033	1,886,054	4,620,084	40.8	0	0	20	6
Source: Nohlen & Stöver

== See also ==
- Switzerland–European Union relations
