= 2009 Swiss referendums =

Referendums held in Switzerland in 2009

Eight referendums were held in Switzerland during 2009. The first was held on 8 February on extending the freedom of movement for workers from Bulgaria and Romania. The next two were held on 17 May 2009 on introducing biometric passports and the "Future with complementary medicine" proposal. A further two were held on 27 September on increasing VAT and the introduction of public initiatives. The final three were held on 29 November on banning the construction of new minarets, exporting weapons and the use of aviation fuel taxation.

== February referendum ==
The February referendum was held on extending the freedom of movement for workers agreement between the European Union and Switzerland to Bulgaria and Romania, which joined the EU on 1 January 2007, and on removing the sunset provision from the agreement. If Swiss voters had rejected the continuation and extension, the EU would likely have invoked the so-called "guillotine clause" to terminate all agreements made as part of the bilateral treaties.

A poll from January 2009 saw 49% in favour of extending the agreement, 40% opposed and 11% undecided; 48% of voters said they would participate in the referendum.

The referendum concluded with a vote in favour of the extension, with German and French-speaking cantons mostly voting in favour (except for narrow votes against in Schwyz, Glarus and Appenzell Innerrhoden) and the Italian-speaking Ticino strongly voting against.

The result caused the left-wing Green Party and the Social Democratic Party to state that they would renew their push for Swiss EU membership.

Choice	Votes	%
For	1,517,132	59.61
Against	1,027,899	40.39
Invalid/blank votes	27,009	–
Total	2,572,040	100
Registered voters/turnout	4,999,618	51.44
Source: Direct Democracy

== May referendums ==
The two referendums in May concerned:

- approval of the introduction of biometric passports
- a proposal "Future with complementary medicine" (Note: German: Zukunft mit Komplementärmedizin; French: Pour la prise en compte des médecines complémentaires; Italian: Un futuro con la medicina complementare)

The biometric passport introduction approval was accepted with a slim majority, with 50.15% in favour of the proposal; the complementary medicine proposal was accepted with 67.0% in favour. Turnout was 39%.

=== Biometric passports ===
Choice	Votes	%
For	953,173	50.15
Against	947,493	49.85
Invalid/blank votes	42,191	–
Total	1,942,857	100
Registered voters/turnout	5,010,873	38.77
Source: Direct Democracy

=== Complementary medicine ===
Choice	Public vote		Cantons		
Choice	Votes	%	Full	Half	Total
For	1,283,894	67.03	20	6	23
Against	631,560	32.97	0	0	0
Invalid/blank votes	28,805	–	–	–	–
Total	1,944,259	100	20	6	23
Registered voters/turnout	5,010,873	38.80	–	–	–
Source: Direct Democracy

== September referendums ==
The September referendum put two questions to voters:

- a limited increase of VAT to continue financing disability insurance (Note: German: Invalidenversicherung; French: assurance-invalidité; Italian: assicurazione per l'invalidità)
- accepting the decision not to introduce general public initiatives (Note: German: allgemeine Volksinitiative; French: initiative populaire générale)

=== VAT increase ===
Choice	Public vote		Cantons		
Choice	Votes	%	Full	Half	Total
For	1,112,818	54.56	11	2	12
Against	926,730	45.44	9	4	11
Invalid/blank votes	23,580	–	–	–	–
Total	2,063,128	100	20	6	23
Registered voters/turnout	5,030,915	41.01	–	–	–
Source: Direct Democracy

=== Public initiatives ===
Choice	Public vote		Cantons		
Choice	Votes	%	Full	Half	Total
For	1,307,237	67.88	20	6	23
Against	618,664	32.12	0	0	0
Invalid/blank votes	108,192	–	–	–	–
Total	2,034,093	100	20	6	23
Registered voters/turnout	5,030,915	40.43	–	–	–
Source: Direct Democracy

== November referendums ==
The results of the November 2009 referendum on minarets by canton. Red indicates opposition to the ban of minarets, green support of the ban.

In the November referendum voters decide on three proposals on the federal level:

- a ban on the construction of new minarets (without retroactive effect on four existing Swiss minarets), passed with 57% in favour; The referendum took place following a campaign to ban minarets in the country.
- a ban on exporting matériel (war supplies), rejected with 68% against;
- a prescription that money collected from aviation fuel taxation should be used for aviation matters, passed with 65% in favour.

There were numerous other issues voted upon at the cantonal and municipal levels.

=== Minaret ban ===
Only one political party, the right wing Swiss People's Party supported the referendum. Pakistani newspaper The Nation on 30 January 2010 carried a fabricated story according to which "the first man who had launched a drive for imposition of ban on mosques minarets" had seen the error of his "evil ways" and had converted to Islam, which had supposedly "created furore in Swiss politics", claiming that Streich "is ashamed of his doings now and desires to construct the most beautiful mosque of Europe in Switzerland." Tikkun Daily on 5 February debunked The Nation's story as a distorted version of a report on Daniel Streich, a Swiss Muslim who left the Swiss People's Party because he was outraged with their campaign.

Final results showed 57.5% of voters in favour of the ban, 19.5 cantons out of 23 in favour of the proposals.

Choice	Public vote		Cantons		
Choice	Votes	%	Full	Half	Total
For	1,535,010	57.50	17	5	19.5
Against	1,134,440	42.50	3	1	3.5
Invalid/blank votes	39,837	–	–	–	–
Total	2,709,287	100	20	6	23
Registered voters/turnout	5,039,676	53.76	–	–	–
Source: Direct Democracy

Key to above graph:

Horizontal axis: abbreviations of Swiss cantons
Red: percentage opposed to ban
Green: percentage supporting ban

=== Arms export ===
The arms referendum sought to ban the export of military weapons and ammunition, in order to further reduce Switzerland's involvement in war. Current law prohibits the exports of materiel to countries involved in armed conflict, or violating human rights. The Swiss arms industry warned of possible job losses if passed, and the cabinet recommended against it saying that existing legislation offers enough protections. The group backing the initiative argued that weapons exports contradict the country's neutrality. A similar initiative was defeated in 1997.

Voters rejected the proposal by 68.2%, with 31.5% in favour of the measure. Turnout was 53%.

Choice	Public vote		Cantons		
Choice	Votes	%	Full	Half	Total
For	837,156	31.77	0	0	0
Against	1,798,132	68.23	20	3	23
Invalid/blank votes	55,200	–	–	–	–
Total	2,690,488	100	20	6	23
Registered voters/turnout	5,039,676	53.39	–	–	–
Source: Direct Democracy

=== Aviation fuel taxation ===
The aviation fuel tax referendum was initiated by centre-right and right members of parliament to direct much of the taxes on kerosene to airport spending. Previously two-thirds of the taxes collected were spent on road safety, with the rest going to the federal general fund. The initiative directs the two-thirds to aviation safety and environmental concerns, with the remainder continuing to be used for discretionary spending.

Voters approved the measure with 65% in favour.

Choice	Public vote		Cantons		
Choice	Votes	%	Full	Half	Total
For	1,609,682	64.99	20	6	23
Against	867,113	35.01	0	0	0
Invalid/blank votes	175,410	–	–	–	–
Total	2,652,205	100	20	6	23
Registered voters/turnout	5,039,676	52.63	–	–	–
Source: Direct Democracy

=== Cantonal referendums ===
In the canton of Obwalden, the voting population turned down plans to reserve sections of land for the wealthy, officially designated "high quality standard of life zones of cantonal interest". These zones were part of Obwalden's strategy of increasing tax attractiveness in competition with other cantons. The referendum was successfully opposed by the cantonal section of the Swiss Green Party. Obwalden already has a flat tax system for the benefit of its rich residents, and attempted to introduce a regressive tax system, which was ruled unconstitutional by the Swiss Federal Court.
