= Claudia Fritsche =

Liechtenstein diplomat (born 1952)

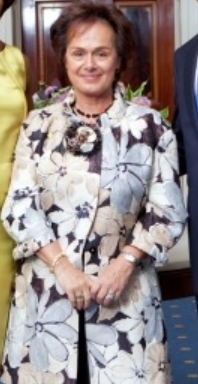

1st Liechtenstein Ambassador to the United States
- In office 7 December 2000 – August 2016
- Preceded by: Office established
- Succeeded by: Kurt Jaeger

Liechtenstein Ambassador to the United Nations
- In office September 1990 – September 2002

Personal details
- Born: July 26, 1952 (age 73)
- Spouse: Manfred
- Education: Salve Regina University (L.H.D.)
- Awards: Commander's Cross of the Princely Liechtenstein Order of Merit

Claudia Fritsche (born 26 July 1952) is a former Liechtenstein diplomat who was Liechtenstein's first ambassador to the United Nations, the United States, and Liechtenstein's first female ambassador.

== Early life ==
Claudia Fritsche was born on 26 July 1952. In 1970, she met Manfred at a dance in Liechtenstein and later married in 1980. From 1970 to 1974, she served as Prime Minister Alfred Hilbe's secretary.

== Career ==
On 1 June 1978, she started working for the foreign affairs office. In February 1983, she became the Second Deputy of the Permanent Representative of Liechtenstein to the Council of Europe. In 1987, she worked at the Liechtenstein embassy in Bern, Switzerland and later worked at the embassy in Vienna, Austria in 1988. From 1987 to 1990, she served as the chairwoman of the Liechtenstein National Committee on Equality between Women and Men while representing the country on the European Committee on Equality between Women and Men.

In September 1990, Prince Hans-Adam II appointed her to serve as the Liechtenstein ambassador to the United Nations and remained in the position until September 2002. From 1999 to 2002, she served as the president of the International Association of Permanent Representatives to the United Nations.

=== United States ===
In September 2000, she was appointed by Hans-Adam II to serve as the first Liechtenstein ambassador to the United States and presented her credentials to President Bill Clinton on 9 December 2000. In May 2016, Salve Regina University gave her an honorary degree in Doctor of Humane Letters and was given the Commander's Cross of the Princely Liechtenstein Order of Merit by Hans-Adam II in September. In August, she retired and was replaced by Kurt Jaeger. At the time of her retirement she was one of the longest serving ambassadors in Washington, D.C.
