= List of ambassadors of Liechtenstein to the United States =

Coordinates: 38.901984°N 77.058674°W

Ambassador of Liechtenstein to the United States
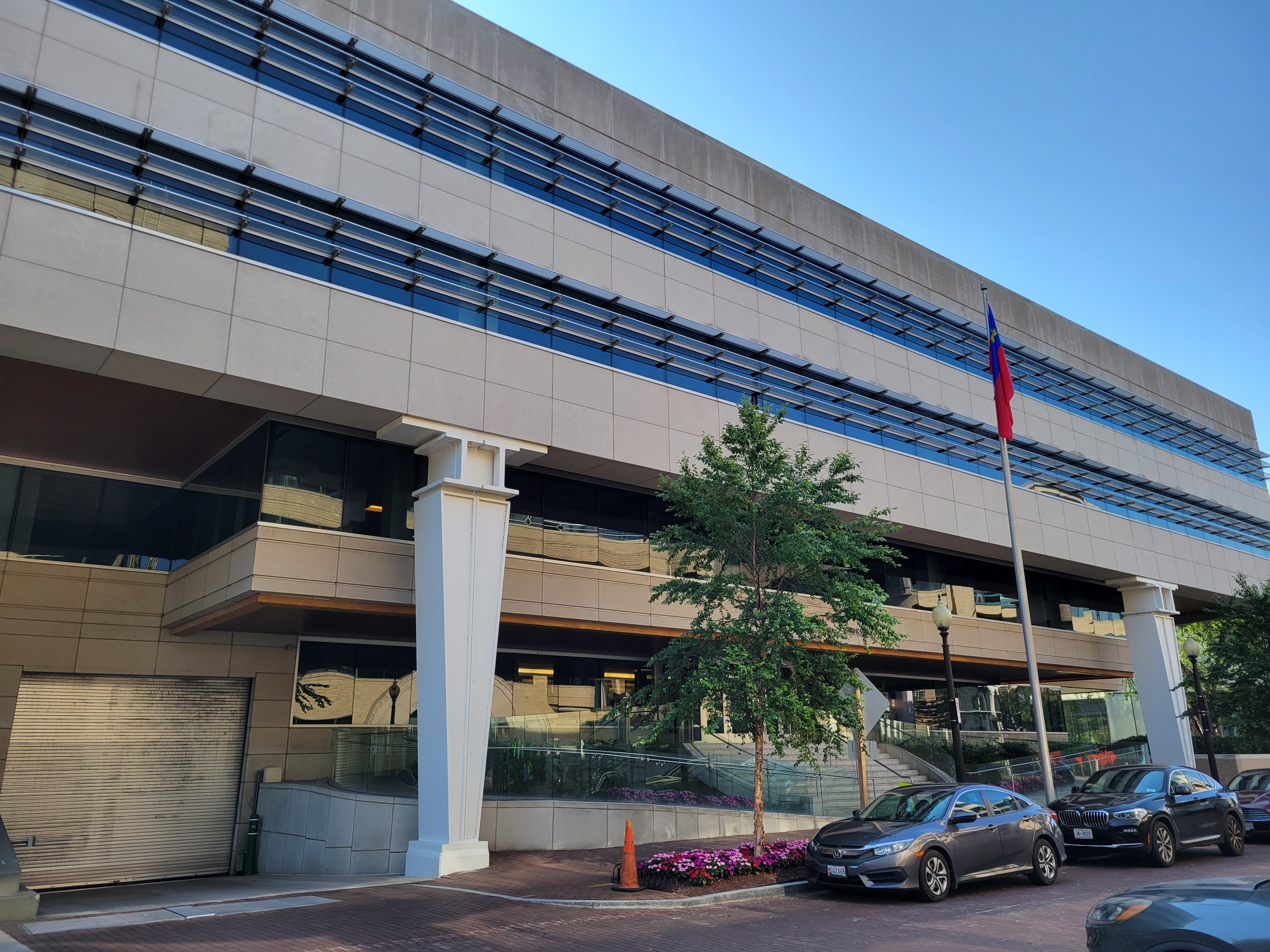
- Incumbent; Georg Sparber since 2021
- Inaugural holder: Claudia Fritsche
- Formation: December 7, 2000

The Liechtenstein ambassador in Washington, D. C. is the official representative of the Government in Vaduz to the Government of the United States.

== List of representatives ==
Diplomatic agrément	Diplomatic accreditation	Ambassador	Observations	List of heads of government of Liechtenstein	List of presidents of the United States	Term end
October 18, 2000	December 7, 2000	Claudia Fritsche		Mario Frick (politician)	Bill Clinton; George W. Bush; Barack Obama	August 2016
August 2016	September 16, 2016	Kurt Jaeger		Adrian Hasler	Barack Obama; Donald Trump; Joe Biden	2021
	January 2021	Georg Sparber		Adrian Hasler	Joe Biden	
