= Guillotine clause =

A guillotine clause is a stipulation that an adoption of a contract package depends on the adoption of all of the individual treaties or contracts included. Under the guillotine clause, if only one treaty or contract is either not accepted by an involved party or canceled later, all treaties or contracts are then deemed not accepted or terminated.

That prevents a party from cherry-picking the treaties of the contract package that it supports if the other party considers it to be essential for all of the contract package to be enforced.

The guillotine clause in treaties of the European Union with other countries is the most notable case of its use.

== Switzerland ==
An example of the guillotine clause is found in the body of bilateral treaties between the European Union to Switzerland. The treaties give Switzerland access to the internal market if Switzerland follows its rules. The clause states that if any of the seven treaties are to be terminated, all of the treaties are automatically terminated. Also, later changes in the underlying EU directives must be accepted by Switzerland.

One reason for the creation of this clause is that the more cumbersome decision-making processes of the European Union would make it difficult for it to respond to the termination of other contracts if Switzerland terminated them.

In 2009, Switzerland accepted a change to one of the treaties, the treaty on free movement of persons, by extending it to the new EU countries. That was relatively controversial in Switzerland, but it was passed in a referendum and so the guillotine clause was not invoked.

After the success of the 2014 Swiss referendum to limit EU immigration through quotas, the invocation of guillotine clause has been suggested to terminate all the other agreements signed since 1999. The EU has claimed that the bilateral treaties already give Switzerland more cherry-picking in its relation to the EU than any other country of which Switzerland should be allowed no more than now. On 22 December 2016, Switzerland and the EU concluded an agreement whereby a new Swiss law (in response to the referendum) would require Swiss employers to prioritise Swiss-based job seekers (whether Swiss nationals or non-Swiss citizens registered in Swiss job agencies) whilst continuing to observe the free movement of EU citizens into Switzerland, thus preventing the guillotine clause from coming into effect.

== European Economic Area ==
EU also has guillotine clauses in the EEA agreements with Norway (2001), Iceland (2001), and Liechtenstein (2008), which must directly accept both existing and added EU directives within several fields relating to trade (except food) free movement and the internal market. Refusing such directives would give the EU the right to terminate the entire EEA agreement and so the EEA countries have avoided doing so.
