= 2001 Swiss referendums =

Eleven referendums were held in Switzerland during 2001. The first three were held on 4 March on popular initiatives on joining the European Union, lowering medicine prices and lowering the urban speed limit to 30 km/h in most places. All three were rejected by voters. The next three referendums were held on 10 June on two separate amendments to the federal law on the Swiss army and on a federal resolution on abolishing the requirement for a permit to establish a diocese, all of which were approved.

The final five referendums were held on 2 December on federal resolution on expenditure, which was approved, and four popular initiatives, all of which were rejected. The popular initiatives were "for an assured Aged and Bereaved insurance - tax on energy instead of work," "for an authentic security policy and a Switzerland without army," "Solidarity creates security: for a voluntary civilian peace service" and "for a capital gains tax."

== Results ==
Month	Question	For		Against		Blank/invalid		Total	Registered voters	Turnout	Cantons for		Cantons against	
Month	Question	Votes	%	Votes	%	Blank	Invalid	Total	Registered voters	Turnout	Full	Half	Full	Half
March	European Union membership	597,217	23.2	1,982,549	76.8	24,106	12,247	2,616,119	4,688,461	55.8	0	0	20	6
March	Lower medicine prices	791,589	30.9	1,774,129	69.1	33,816	12,474	2,612,008	4,688,461	55.7	0	0	20	6
March	Urban speed limit of 30 km/h	525,609	20.3	2,063,314	79.7	15,095	12,121	2,616,139	4,688,461	55.8	0	0	20	6
June	Federal law on the military amendment (1)	1,002,297	51.0	963,329	49.0	23,112	8,920	1,997,658	4,698,399	42.5				
June	Federal law on the military amendment (2)	1,001,274	51.1	956,503	48.9	29,967	8,986	1,996,730	4,698,399	42.5				
June	Abolishing permits for creating diocese	1,194,556	64.2	666,108	35.8	104,957	10,037	1,975,658	4,698,399	42.0	20	6	0	0
December	Federal resolution on expenditure	1,472,259	84.7	265,090	15.3	38,522	6,510	1,782,381	4,712,583	37.8	20	6	0	0
December	For an assured Aged and Bereaved insurance	397,747	22.9	1,342,001	77.1	37,319	6,440	1,783,507	4,712,583	37.8	0	0	20	6
December	For an authentic security policy	384,905	21.9	1,372,420	78.1	23,609	6,364	1,787,298	4,712,583	37.9	0	0	20	6
December	Solidarity creates security	404,870	23.2	1,339,221	76.8	33,323	6,446	1,783,860	4,712,583	37.9	0	0	20	6
December	For a capital gains tax	594,927	34.1	1,149,182	65.9	33,048	6,414	1,783,571	4,712,583	37.8	0	0	20	6
Source: Nohlen

== See also ==
- Switzerland–European Union relations
