= Yes to Europe! =

2001 Swiss federal popular initiative

The federal popular initiative “Yes to Europe!” was a Swiss federal popular initiative launched in 1996 and submitted to a vote on 4 March 2001. It sought to open negotiations for Switzerland’s accession to the European Union, subject to a final decision by the people and the cantons. The Federal Council and Parliament recommended its rejection. It was rejected by 76.8% of voters and by all cantons.

== Content ==
The initiative proposed the addition of three transitional provisions to the Swiss Federal Constitution to require the immediate opening of negotiations with the European Union “without delay” with a view to Switzerland joining the EU, with the final decision being subject to a mandatory referendum. The initiative also stipulated that, during these negotiations, both the rights of the cantons and the "fundamental values of democracy and federalism as well as social and environmental achievements" must be preserved.

The full text of the initiative can be consulted on the website of the Swiss Federal Chancellery.

== Background ==
=== Historical context ===
On 20 May 1992, the Swiss government submitted an application for accession to the European Community, based on an official report published two days earlier. In response, the Lega dei Ticinesi and the Swiss Democrats launched on 21 July 1992 an initiative entitled "EU accession negotiations: let the people decide!" to give the people and the cantons the power to confirm the opening of these negotiations.

On 6 December 1992, however, a narrow majority of the voters and a large majority of the cantons rejected the agreement on the European Economic Area. As a consequence, the accession application was frozen by the authorities for an indefinite period.

The Lega and Swiss Democrats' initiative nonetheless succeeded on 21 January 1994 and was rejected in the popular vote on 8 June 1997.

=== Signature collection and submission of the initiative ===
Meanwhile, a committee made up of representatives from several pro-European movements is launching this new initiative with the sole aim, according to its initiators, of restarting negotiations in order to determine, at the end of those negotiations, “what membership means for Switzerland, what it will receive and what it will have to contribute".

The collection of the required 100,000 signatures began on 21 February 1995. On 30 July 1996, the initiative was submitted to the Swiss Federal Chancellery, which formally confirmed its success on 14 February 1997.

=== Discussions and recommendations of the authorities ===
The Federal Assembly and the Federal Council both recommended rejection of the initiative. In its message to the Federal Assembly, the Federal Council noted that, according to the division of powers between the authorities as defined by the Constitution, the opening of international negotiations falls under its decision and not a popular vote. It therefore proposed, as an indirect counter-proposal, a federal decree stating that "Switzerland participates in the European integration process and aims to join the European Union for this purpose" while giving the executive responsibility for organising the negotiations as well as the choice of the timing to reactivate the accession application.

After lengthy debates between the two federal chambers, the Federal Council's counter-proposal was ultimately rejected by the Council of States, the main reason being the desire to leave the authorities "full autonomy in matters of foreign policy".

The voting recommendations of the political parties are as follows

Political party	Recommendation
Swiss Democrats	No
Christian Social Party	Yes
Christian Democratic Party	Yes
Evangelical Party	No
Liberal Party	Yes
Freedom Party	No
Radical Democratic Party	No
Socialist Party	Yes
Swiss Labor Party	Yes
Swiss People's Party	No
Swiss Federal Democratic Union	No
The Greens	Yes

=== Vote ===
On March 4, 2001, the initiative was rejected unanimously by the cantons and by 76.8% of the votes cast, with a turnout of 55.8%.

== Aftermath ==
Despite this popular rejection, the Confederation and the European Union launched a new cycle of negotiations, leading to a second series of bilateral agreements, signed on 26 October 2004
