= Denmark–Switzerland relations =

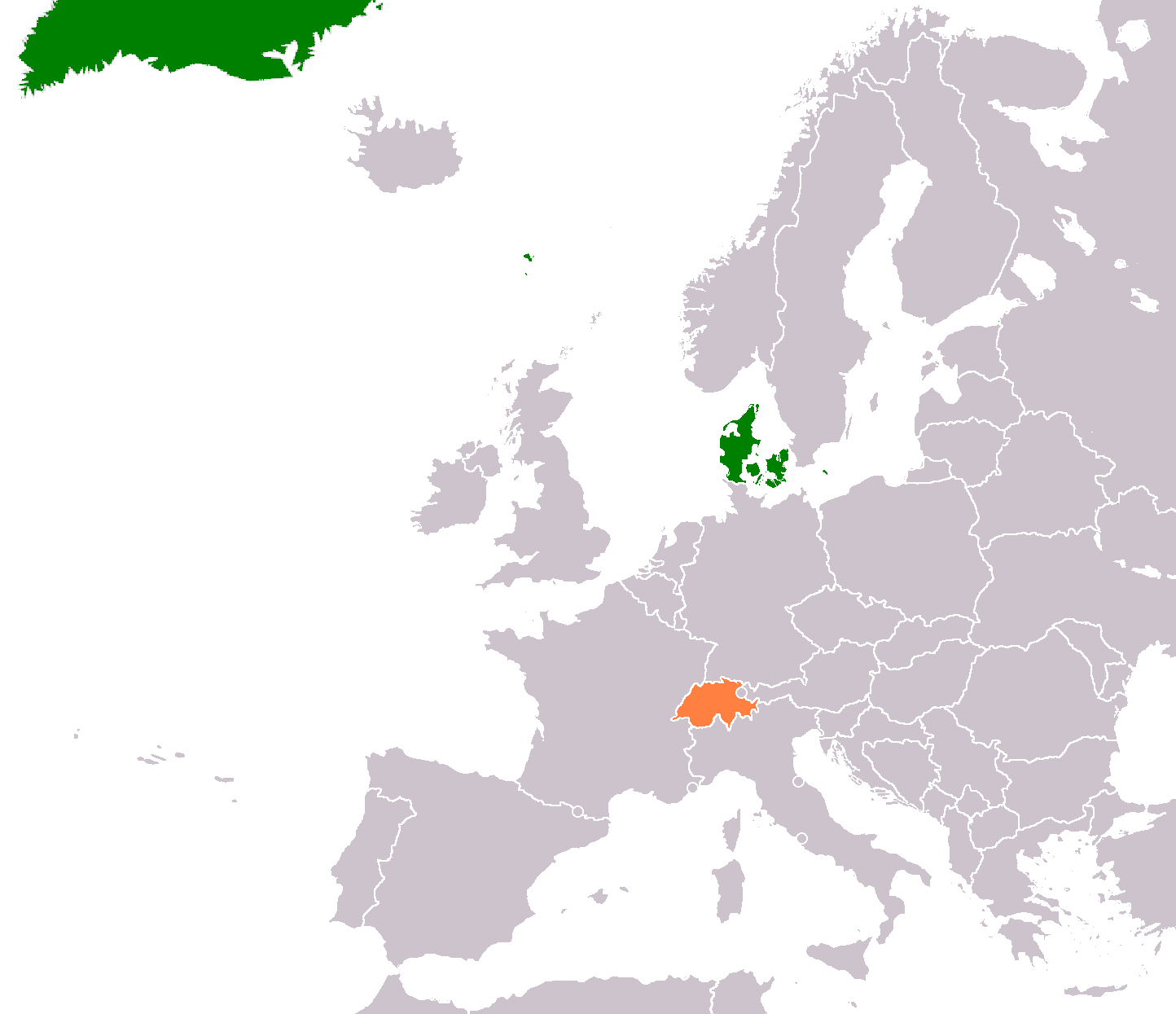
- Denmark: Switzerland

Denmark–Switzerland relations refers to the current and historical relations between Denmark and Switzerland. Denmark has an embassy in Bern. Switzerland has an embassy in Copenhagen, but only offers consular services from the Nordic Regional Consular Centre in Stockholm. Diplomatic relations between Denmark and Switzerland were established in 1945. Denmark is a full member of the European Union and NATO, while Switzerland is not.

== History ==
A treaty of Friendship, Trading Commerce and Establishment between Denmark and Switzerland was signed on 10 February 1875. The first treaty between Denmark and Switzerland was signed on 10 December 1827. Another treaty was about conscription, signed on 10 February 1875. Before 1945, Switzerland was represented in Denmark, through a consulate in Sweden, and a consulate general in Copenhagen. When diplomatic relations were established in 1945, Switzerland opened a legation in Copenhagen, and later an embassy. On 22 June 1950, Denmark and Switzerland signed an agreement on air services. On 21 May 1954, a convention on social insurance was signed. An agreement on road transport was signed in 1989. Switzerland also signed an agreement with Faroe Islands.

== Economic relations ==
Trade between Denmark and Switzerland is "developed". Danish exports to Switzerland amounted to 4.6 billion DKK, and Swiss export to Denmark amounted to 5 billion DKK.

== State visits ==
In September 2002, President of Switzerland Kaspar Villiger, visited Denmark and Anders Fogh Rasmussen. After the meeting, Fogh Rasmussen said "I have had a good and constructive discussion with the Swiss President". In March 2008, Danish Foreign Minister Per Stig Moeller visited Switzerland to meet Federal Councillor Micheline Calmy-Rey.

== See also ==
- Foreign relations of Denmark
- Foreign relations of Switzerland
