= 2006 Swiss referendums =

Referendums conducted in Switzerland during 2006

Six referendums were held in Switzerland during 2006. The first was held on 21 May on revising article 48a in the Swiss Federal Constitution on education, and was approved by 86% of voters. The second set of three referendums was held on 24 September on proposed amendments to the laws on asylum and foreigners, as well as a popular initiative on diverting profits from the Swiss National Bank into the national pension fund. The two laws were approved, whilst the initiative was rejected.

The final two referendums were held on 26 November on laws on assistance to Poland and other poorer EU countries, and family allowances. Both were approved.

== Results ==
Month	Question	For		Against		Invalid/ blank	Total	Registered voters	Turnout	Cantons for		Cantons against	
Month	Question	Votes	%	Votes	%	Invalid/ blank	Total	Registered voters	Turnout	Full	Half	Full	Half
May	Constitutional amendment on education	1,137,450	85.6	191,666	14.4	26,943	1,356,059	4,877,897	27.8	20	6	0	0
September	Swiss National Bank profits	973,831	41.7	1,359,514	58.3	52,246	2,385,591	4,893,927	48.7	2	1	18	5
September	Amendment to the foreigners law	1,602,134	68.0	755,119	32.0	36,243	2,393,496	4,893,927	48.9				
September	Amendment to the asylum law	1,598,399	67.8	760,787	32.2	34,620	2,393,806	4,893,927	48.9				
November	Amendment to the family allowances law	1,480,796	68.0	697,415	32.0	28,268	2,206,479	4,902,446	45.0				
November	Law on assistance for eastern Europe	1,158,494	53.4	1,010,190	46.6	36,585	2,205,269	4,902,446	45.0				
Source: Direct Democracy
