= Pirmin Schwander =

Swiss politician

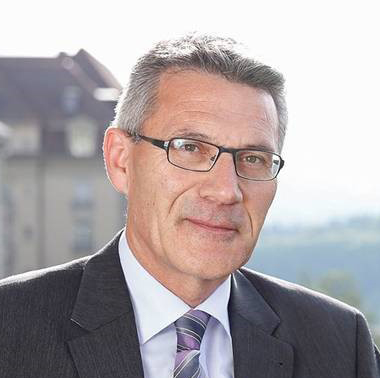
- Official portrait, 2016

Member of the Council of States
- Incumbent
- Assumed office 4 December 2023
- Constituency: Canton of Schwyz

Member of the National Council
- In office 1 December 2003 – 4 December 2023
- Constituency: Canton of Schwyz

Personal details
- Born: 28 December 1961 (age 64) Galgenen, Switzerland
- Spouse: Katharina Auckenthaler
- Children: 2
- Occupation: Businessman, economist and politician
- Website: Official website (in German)

Military service
- Allegiance: Switzerland
- Branch/service: Swiss Armed Forces
- Rank: Lieutenant

Pirmin Schwander (born 28 December 1961 in Galgenen) is a Swiss businessman, economist and politician. He has served as a member on the National Council for the Swiss People's Party since 2003. In the 2023 Swiss federal election Schwander was nominated to serve on the Council of States, which he won.

Schwander served as president of the Campaign for an Independent and Neutral Switzerland from 2004 to 2014.
