= 1989 Swiss referendums =

Three referendums were held in Switzerland in 1989. The first was held on 4 June on a popular initiative "for nature-oriented farming—against animal factories", which was rejected by voters. The second and third were held on 26 November on popular initiatives "for a Switzerland without army and a comprehensive policy of peace" and on introducing 130 and 100 kilometres per hour speed limits, both of which were rejected.

== Results ==
=== June: Agriculture ===
Choice	Popular vote		Cantons		
Choice	Votes	%	Full	Half	Total
For	741,772	48.9	7	2	8
Against	773,693	51.1	13	4	15
Blank votes	29,347	–	–	–	–
Invalid votes	2,445	–	–	–	–
Total	1,547,257	100	20	6	23
Registered voters/turnout	4,302,785	36.0	–	–	–
Source: Nohlen & Stöver

=== November: Abolishing the army ===
Choice	Popular vote		Cantons		
Choice	Votes	%	Full	Half	Total
For	1,052,442	35.6	2	0	2
Against	1,904,476	64.4	18	6	21
Blank votes	27,617	–	–	–	–
Invalid votes	4,791	–	–	–	–
Total	2,989,326	100	20	6	23
Registered voters/turnout	4,320,933	69.2	–	–	–
Source: Nohlen & Stöver

=== November: Speed limits ===
Choice	Popular vote		Cantons		
Choice	Votes	%	Full	Half	Total
For	1,126,458	38.0	6	0	6
Against	1,836,521	62.0	14	6	17
Blank votes	20,165	–	–	–	–
Invalid votes	4,822	–	–	–	–
Total	2,987,966	100	20	6	23
Registered voters/turnout	4,320,933	69.2	–	–	–
Source: Nohlen & Stöver
