= Greece–Switzerland relations =

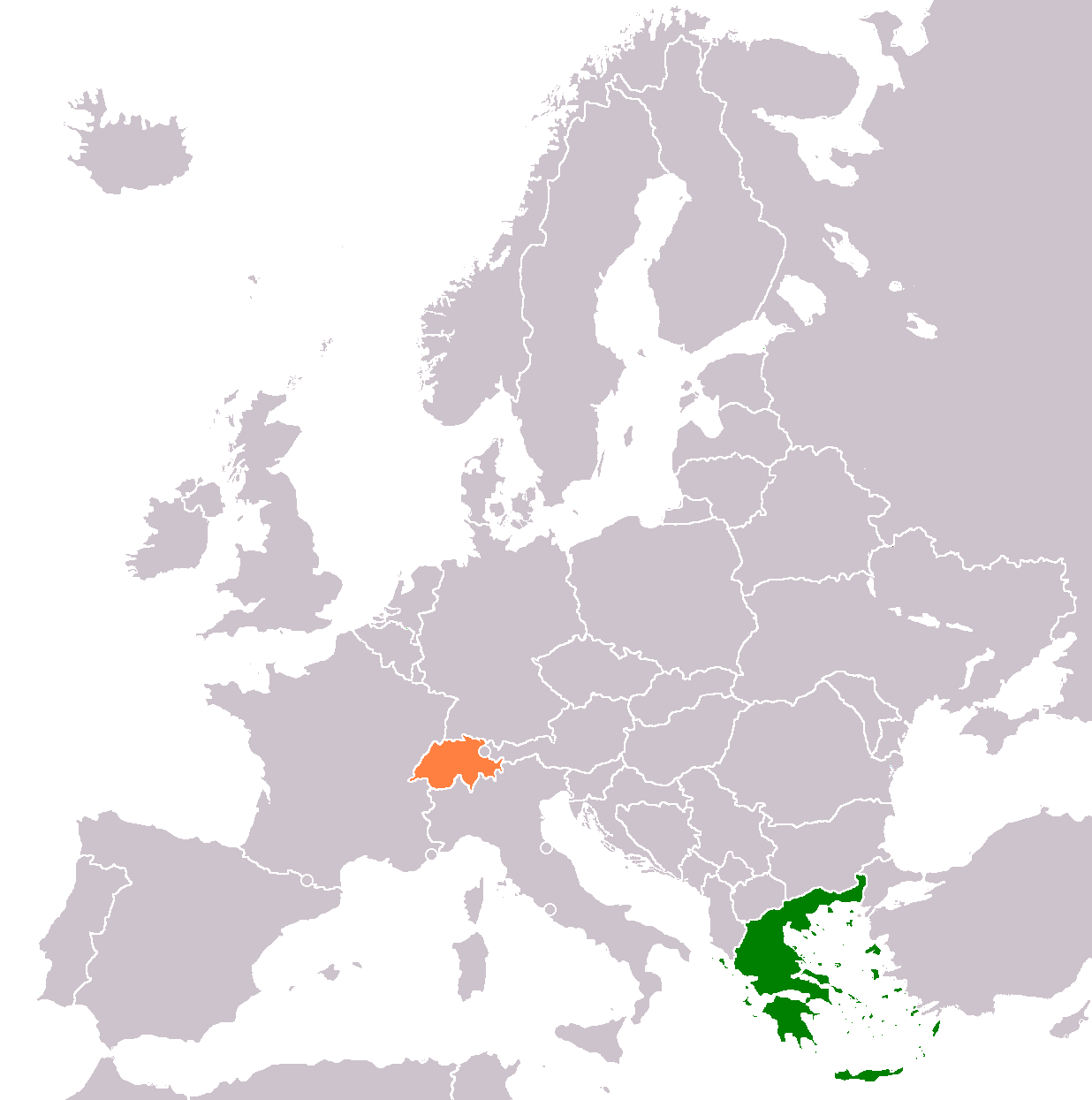
- Greece: Switzerland

Greece–Switzerland relations are foreign relations between Greece and Switzerland. Both countries established diplomatic relations in 1830. Switzerland opened its consulate in 1865. Greece has an embassy in Bern, a general consulate in Geneva, and two honorary consulates in Zürich and Lugano. Switzerland has an embassy in Athens and four consulates (Thessaloniki, Corfu, Patras, Rhodes).

== History ==
=== 19th century ===
Greece and Switzerland have a long tradition of relations. Before and during the Congress of Vienna in 1815 Ioannis Kapodistrias, a native of Corfu in the service of Tsar Alexander I of Russia, laboured successfully for reorganisation of the Swiss Confederation and for the international recognition of Swiss neutrality. In 1816, he became the first honorary citizen of the city of Lausanne and in 1827, the first Governor of the Hellenic State.

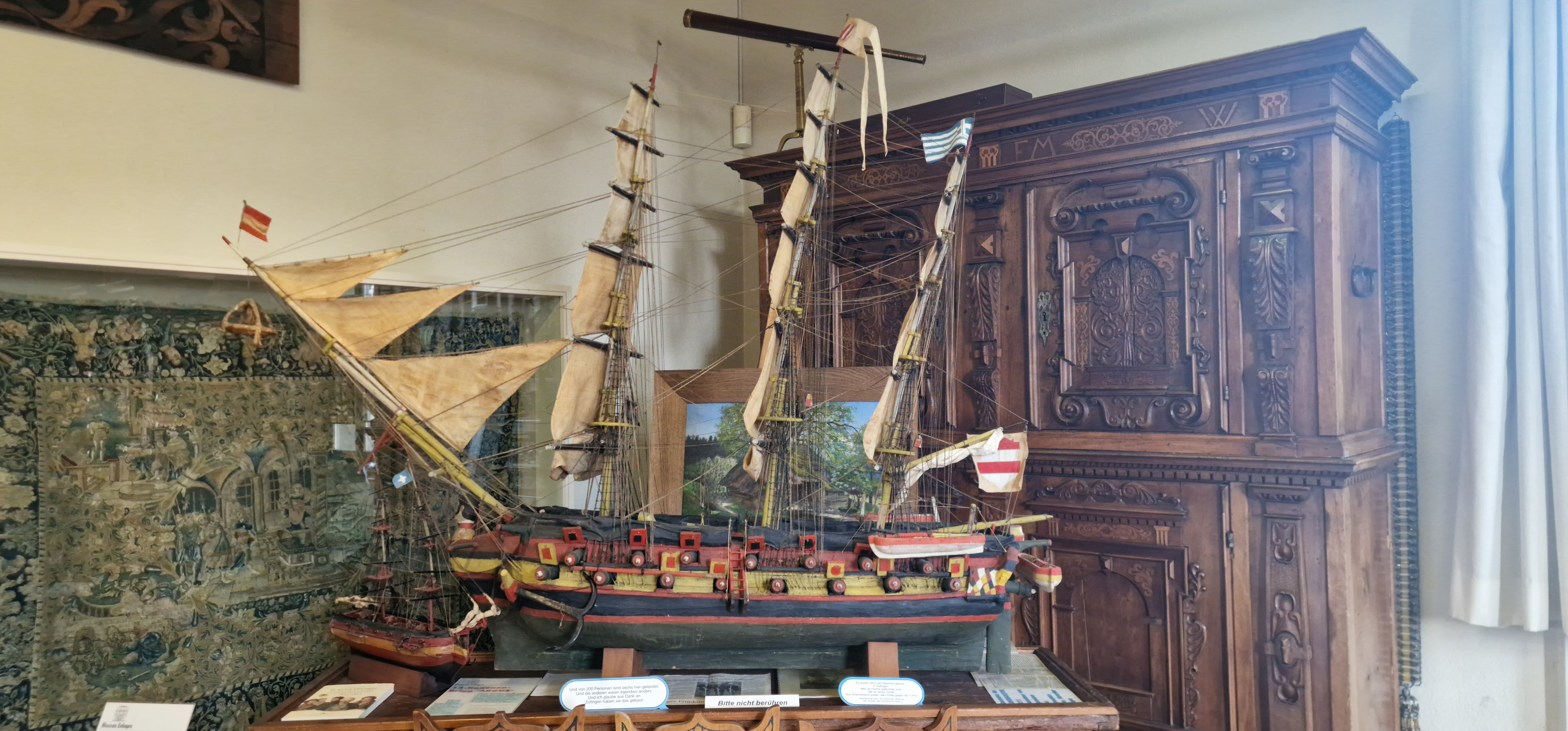
The Zofingen Museum houses two Greek model warships: Eleftheria, the larger vessel, and Argos, the smaller one.

In 1823, hundreds of Greeks became stranded in Switzerland after France refused them passage to the port of Marseille. These men were veterans of a failed uprising against Ottoman rule in the Danubian Principalities during the Greek War of Independence. After their defeat, they fled north and west across Europe to escape reprisals, trying to bypass Ottoman and Austrian territories. Their long journey took them from Eastern Europe through German territories and into Switzerland. They hoped to reach France and sail from Marseille back to Greece. However, political tensions and diplomatic pressure blocked their transit through France, leaving them stranded in Switzerland for several months. The refugees were distributed among 29 Swiss towns across different cantons. Six of them were sent to Zofingen, they aged between 18 and 33 and their hometowns were Messolonghi, Preveza and Smyrna. There, the Greeks were received with sympathy. Local authorities and citizens provided accommodation and basic support. To occupy themselves during their stay and gain some money, they took part in military exercises with Swiss soldiers and were entrusted with cleaning rifles in the town armoury. When France finally reopened its borders six months later, in May 1823, the refugees were allowed to travel onward to Marseille. To express their gratitude for the hospitality they had received, the six Greeks crafted two model warships, named Eleftheria and Argos. They presented the ships as gifts to Johann Jakob Suter, a local physician and military officer, and to the town of Zofingen. These ships remain on permanent display today at the Zofingen Museum. The six Greeks left Switzerland together with the other Greek refugees. Johann Jakob Suter described the Greeks as respectful and well behaved. A report by the Aargau cantonal government similarly noted that the Greeks were calm, modest and resigned demeanor, adding that they willingly accepted every arrangement and hardship.

Switzerland was one of the nations that supported the creation of the Greek state in 1830. Two natives of Geneva exercised important functions in the newly constituted Greek monarchy: Jean-Gabriel Eynard as one of the founders of the National Bank of Greece (1842) and Louis-André Gosse was involved in fighting the plague epidemic of 1827 and was a commander in the Hellenic Navy.

=== 20th century ===
During the Second World War, Switzerland represented the interests of numerous countries in occupied Greece and supported the civilian population. During the rule of military junta in Greece, many opposition figures found refuge in Switzerland. The Swiss Committee for the Restoration of Democracy in Greece was formed in Bern in 1967.

== Agreements ==
Greece and Switzerland have a number of treaties between the two countries, mainly dealing with commerce. Some of the major treaties between the countries deal with Social Security and the avoidance of double taxation in respect of income tax.

== Trade ==
The balance of trade between Greece and Switzerland is generally toward Switzerland, with Greece having a constant trade deficit. Between 2006 and 2007, Swiss exports to Greece increased 12.9%, while Greek exports to Switzerland increased 26.4%. The main Swiss products imported into Greece are pharmaceuticals and medical supplies, watches, clocks and other luxury goods, machinery and high technology products, electronic equipment, and specific types of food. The main Greek products imported into Switzerland are food and beverages, chemicals, construction materials, and textiles. There are about 48 Swiss companies in Greece which employ about 10,000 people in Greece. Around 300,000 Swiss vacationers visit Greece every year.

Balance of Trade between Greece and Switzerland (in millions of Swiss Francs)
	1998	1999	2000	2001	2002	2003	2004	2007
Swiss exports to Greece	928.4	852.7	848.7	910.2	948.8	1091.9	1180.7	1306
Greek exports to Switzerland	120.4	126.4	136.1	153.0	134.8	151.9	150.3	316
Balance of Trade	-808.0	-726.3	-712.6	-757.2	-814.0	-940.0	-1030.4	-990

== Greek population ==
About 11,000 Greeks live in Switzerland, with about 7,000 of them living in Zürich. Most major Swiss towns have a Greek association or community. There are (as of April 2008) 2,921 Swiss living in Greece.

Notable people

- Krateros Katsoulis - Swiss-born actor and TV presenter in Greece
- Panos Mouzourakis - Swiss-born actor - comedian and singer
- Sofia Milos - Swiss-born actress
- Seraina Kazamia - half Swiss model - GNTM winner
- Melia Kreiling - Swiss-born American actress
- Giorgio A. Tsoukalos - Swiss-born writer, ufologist, television presenter and producer
- Theodore Modis - is a strategic business analyst, futurist, physicist, and international consultant
- Yorgo Modis - a Wellcome Trust Senior Research Fellow, and Reader in Virology and Immunology, at the Department of Medicine, University of Cambridge. He is head of The Modis Lab in the Molecular Immunity Unit at the MRC Laboratory of Molecular Biology.
- Josef Zisyadis - politician
- Nico Georgiadis - Swiss chess player
- Kosta Zafiriou - musician
- Alex Fontana - Swiss racing driver of Greek descent
- John Antonakis - professor of organizational behavior at the Faculty of Business and Economics of the University of Lausanne and current editor-in-chief of The Leadership Quarterly
- Hélène Guisan - writer
- Nanos Valaoritis - Swiss-born writer, poet, novelist and playwright
- Leonidas Stergiou - Swiss professional footballer
- Giorgios Nemtsoudis - Swiss footballer
- Vasias Alexandrakis - son of Greek actor Αλέκος Αλεξανδράκης and Swiss Verena Gauer Greek citizen
- Johanna Alexandraki - daughter Greek actor Αλέκος Αλεξανδράκης and Swiss Verena Gauer Swiss citizen
- Stavros Niarchos - Greek shipowner

== Resident diplomatic missions ==
- Greece has an embassy in Bern and a consulate-general in Geneva.
- Switzerland has an embassy in Athens.

== See also ==
- Foreign relations of Greece
- Foreign relations of Switzerland
