= 1986 Swiss referendums =

Six referendums were held in Switzerland in 1986. The first was held on 16 March on joining the United Nations, but was rejected by 76% of voters. The next three were held on 29 September on popular initiatives on culture and vocational education and a federal resolution on the domestic sugar economy. All three were rejected, including the counter-proposal to the culture initiative.

The final two referendums were held on 7 December on popular initiatives "for the protection of tenants" and "for a just taxation of truck traffic." The tenant proposal was approved, whilst the vehicle taxation initiative was rejected.

== Results ==
=== March: UN membership ===
Choice	Popular vote		Cantons		
Choice	Votes	%	Full	Half	Total
For	511,713	24.3	0	0	0
Against	1,591,150	75.7	20	6	23
Blank votes	15,126	–	–	–	–
Invalid votes	2,141	–	–	–	–
Total	2,120,130	100	20	6	23
Registered voters/turnout	4,181,276	50.7	–	–	–
Source: Nohlen & Stöver

=== September: Culture ===
Choice	Popular initiative					Counterproposal				
Choice	Popular vote		Cantons			Popular vote		Cantons		
Choice	Votes	%	Full	Half	Total	Votes	%	Full	Half	Total
For	232,236	16.7	0	0	0	548,081	39.3	0	0	0
Against	1,048,679	75.2	20	6	23	670,195	48.1	20	6	23
No answer	113,566	8.1	–	–	–	175,995	12.6	–	–	–
Blank votes	53,657	–	–	–	–	53,657	–	–	–	–
Invalid votes	12,090	–	–	–	–	12,090	–	–	–	–
Total	1,460,318	100	20	6	23	1,460,318	100	20	6	23
Registered voters/turnout	4,203,197	34.7	–	–	–	4,203,197	34.7	–	–	–
Source: Direct Democracy

=== September: Vocational education ===
Choice	Popular vote		Cantons		
Choice	Votes	%	Full	Half	Total
For	261,759	18.4	0	0	0
Against	1,162,238	81.6	20	6	23
Blank votes	37,216	–	–	–	–
Invalid votes	2,186	–	–	–	–
Total	1,463,399	100	20	6	23
Registered voters/turnout	4,203,197	34.8	–	–	–
Source: Nohlen & Stöver

=== September: Domestic sugar economy ===
Choice	Votes	%
For	548,779	38.2
Against	887,726	61.8
Blank votes	29,103	–
Invalid votes	2,191	–
Total	1,466,799	100
Registered voters/turnout	4,203,197	34.9
Source: Nohlen & Stöver

=== December: Tenant protection ===
Choice	Popular vote		Cantons		
Choice	Votes	%	Full	Half	Total
For	922,221	64.4	17	3	18.5
Against	510,490	35.6	3	3	4.5
Blank votes	27,036	–	–	–	–
Invalid votes	1,841	–	–	–	–
Total	1,461,588	100	20	6	23
Registered voters/turnout	4,210,819	34.7	–	–	–
Source: Nohlen & Stöver

=== December: Vehicle taxation ===
Choice	Popular vote		Cantons		
Choice	Votes	%	Full	Half	Total
For	485,930	33.9	0	0	0
Against	648,612	66.1	20	6	23
Blank votes	26,325	–	–	–	–
Invalid votes	2,042	–	–	–	–
Total	1,462,909	100	20	6	23
Registered voters/turnout	4,210,819	34.7	–	–	–
Source: Nohlen & Stöver
