= Special Provisions =

The Special Provisions were a series of articles introduced in the Federal Constitution of the Swiss Confederation. Adopted during the Kulturkampf at the end of the 19th century, they were mainly intended to limit the influence of the Roman Catholic Church to the benefit of the Protestant radicalism then practiced by the majority of the population and cantons, but also took aim at Judaism. The articles unilaterally restricted freedom of faith and conscience by explicitly denying certain rights to certain religions.

Most articles were repealed during the second half of the 20th century via popular vote (1973, 2001) and the new Federal Constitution of 1999.

== Background ==
The Special Provisions had their origins in the cultural struggle of the 19th century. At that time, liberal forces were fighting with the Catholic-conservative forces over state power. This initially led to the Sonderbund War, which resulted in the first Swiss Federal Constitution of 1848. The Constitution contained an article banning the Jesuits and their "affiliated societies" from all activities in the State and church.

This Kulturkampf did not end in 1848, however, but broke out again in the 1870s when the Federal Council and the Church fought over the division of the Swiss dioceses and the Catholic Church's claims to power.

The Society of Jesus had already been banned in Germany in 1872 (Jesuit Law), as well as in various other European countries. The Constitution introduced four new provisions with broader dispositions against religious orders.

== The Federal Constitution of 1874 ==
The second Swiss Federal Constitution, which was introduced by referendum in 1874, granted religious freedom to a greater extent for the first time. It also included, however, several articles that were culturally militant, i.e. directed against the Catholic Church. The supporters of these articles saw them as measures to protect religious peace, while the majority of Swiss Catholics saw them as discrimination.

=== Article 50 ===
Article 50, introduced in 1874, was a direct consequence of the preceding conflict between the Swiss Federal Council and the Pope and several influential clergymen. Paragraph 4 prohibited the establishment of dioceses on the territory of the Swiss Confederation without the express approval of the Federal Government.

The free exercise of acts of worship is guaranteed within the bounds of morality and public order.

The cantons and the Confederation reserve the right to take appropriate measures to maintain order and public peace among the members of the various religious communities and to prevent encroachments by ecclesiastical authorities on the rights of citizens and the state.

Disputes arising from public or private law concerning the formation or separation of religious communities may be submitted to the decision of the competent federal authorities by way of appeal.

The establishment of dioceses on Swiss territory is subject to the approval of the Confederation

In 1964, National Councillor Alfred Ackermann submitted a motion calling for the article on bishoprics to be deleted, but to no avail. The provision was also included in the new Federal Constitution in 1999 as Article 72 paragraph 3, against the opposition of the Catholic Church. It was only in the referendum of June 10, 2001 (approved by 64 percent of the population and all cantons) that the paragraph was deleted without replacement as the last of the remaining Special Provisions.

=== Articles 51 and 52 ===
Articles 51 specifically prohibited the presence of the Society of Jesus on the territory of the Confederation, going further than the 1848 provisions that merely prevented Jesuits from holding State or Church charges. Article 52 prohibited the establishment or re-establishment of monasteries in general. These two provisions were also referred to as the Jesuit Articles.

The Jesuit Order and its affiliated societies shall not be admitted to any part of Switzerland, and their members shall be prohibited from any activity in the church or schools. This prohibition may also be extended by federal decree to other religious orders whose activity is dangerous to the State or disturbs the peace of the denominations.

— Article 51

The establishment of new and the restoration of dissolved monasteries or religious orders is not permitted.

— Article 52

As early as 1919, the Catholic-conservative National Councillor Jean-Marie Musy had demanded the repeal of these articles. This was delayed until 1947 and finally written off. After 1950, however, a rethink began, with non-Catholic constitutional lawyers such as Werner Kägi and François Aubert now also judging the articles to be "untenable" and "discriminatory". In practice, the articles were also interpreted more and more liberally, so that priories, for example, were tolerated.

Ludwig von Moos submitted a motion in 1954 calling for these two articles to be deleted without replacement. In the referendum of May 20, 1973, the federal decree on the repeal of the Jesuit and monastery articles of the Federal Constitution was adopted, thereby removing these articles from the constitution. 54.9 percent of voters were in favor of repeal, 45.1 percent against. The majority of the cantons was achieved with 16 1/2 in favor and 5 1/2 against.

=== Article 75 ===
This article excluded clergymen from all churches, including the Reformed Church, from election to the National Council.

Any Swiss citizen of secular standing who is entitled to vote is eligible to vote as a member of the National Council.

— Article 75

As Article 96 stipulated that only those who have the right to stand for election to the National Council were eligible for election to the Federal Council, no clergyman could be elected to the national government. Election to the Council of States was possible in principle, as the right to vote for the Council of States is a matter for the respective cantons.

Article 75 was no longer included in the 1999 revision of the Federal Constitution and was tacitly abolished.

=== Article 25 bis ===
The article was passed by popular vote in 1893 and, although presented as an animal protection measure by its initiators, the campaign leading up to the vote reflected the anti-Semitism of the time.

it is expressly forbidden to bleed slaughter animals without first stunning them; this provision applies to all methods of slaughter and to all types of livestock.

— Article 25 bis

In this case, the government actually opposed this initiative on the grounds that it restricted the freedom of conscience and worship of Jews. Blamed for the economic crisis of 1873, Jews were increasingly used as scapegoats in Europe. The arguments used in the 1893 campaign had strong antisemitic components, and were louder in the German-speaking part of the country (Saxony had banned ritual slaughter in 1892): the majority was clearest in Aargau (90.1 percent in support) or Zurich (85.9%), while in French-speaking Switzerland and Ticino, where anti-Semitism and animal protection were less resonant, the initiative was clearly rejected (3.1% in Valais, 12.2% in Ticino).

The article was removed from the Constitution during the 1973 referendum, to be replaced by a dedicated law on animal welfare.

== See also ==
- 2009 Swiss minaret referendum
