= Capital punishment in Switzerland =

Europe holds the greatest concentration of abolitionist states (blue). Map current as of 2024 Abolished for all offences Abolished in practice Retains capital punishment

Capital punishment is forbidden in Switzerland under article 10, paragraph 1 of the Swiss Federal Constitution. Capital punishment was abolished from federal criminal law in 1942, but remained available in military criminal law until 1992. The last actual executions in Switzerland took place during World War II.

== Use, abolition and reinstatement ==
In the Middle Ages and Early Modern period, the most common method of execution, at least for males, was decapitation with a sword. The archivist Gerold Meyer von Knonau has provided statistics for the canton of Zurich from the 15th century up to and including the 18th century. 1,445 persons were condemned to death (1,198 men, 247 women). 915 of these were sentenced to be beheaded, 270 hanged, 130 burnt alive, 99 drowned, 26 broken on the wheel, 1 quartered alive, 2 buried alive, 1 immured, and the last one was impaled. The last three execution methods were in use in the 15th century; drowning was discontinued in 1613.

In 1835, the guillotine was added, although many cantons allowed the condemned person to choose between these two methods. One of the last people to be executed with a sword was Niklaus Emmenegger in Lucerne on 6 July 1867. Geneviève Guénat, the last woman to be executed, was beheaded by this method in Delsberg, Bern on 7 September 1862, Héli Freymond in Vaud on 11 January 1868. In 1848 the death penalty for political crimes was forbidden by the constitution. In 1874, with the introduction of the new federal constitution in 1874, it was generally abolished throughout the country. However, because of an increase in crime – much due to the economic depression at the time – capital punishment was re-introduced in 1879. The revocation of the ban, however, was not obligatory and only a number of cantons chose to reinstate the penalty on the cantonal level.

== Abolition (1937–1942) ==
On 21 December 1937 the Federal Assembly of Switzerland adopted the first national criminal code. It abolished capital punishment, which had been provided for by several cantonal criminal codes. The new code was ratified by referendum on 3 July 1938 and entered into force on 1 January 1942. The last person to be sentenced to death by a civil court and executed was Hans Vollenweider, convicted of three murders and then executed on 18 October 1940 in Sarnen, Obwalden. Because of the impending abolition, Vollenweider's verdict – performed with a guillotine borrowed from Lucerne – was controversial.

Swiss military law, however, still provided for capital punishment for treason and certain other military offenses such as desertion in the face of the enemy. During World War II, 33 people were sentenced to death for spying for Nazi Germany, 15 of them in absentia. Seventeen of those condemned were executed, all of them by firing squad. With the exception of one man from Liechtenstein (Alfred Quaderer), all of those executed were Swiss. This law was abolished by the Federal Assembly on 20 March 1992 after a parliamentary initiative by Massimo Pini of the Free Democratic Party of Switzerland. The 1999 Swiss Federal Constitution then banned capital punishment at the constitutional level.

== Re-introduction initiatives ==
In 1979, National Council member Valentin Oehen from Swiss Democrats (DS) submitted a parliamentary initiative that would have introduced the death penalty for murder and terrorism involving hostage-taking. The National Council rejected this by 131 votes to 3.

Two initiatives have so far been launched to amend the Constitution to provide for the reintroduction of capital punishment. The first, in 1985, would have made drug dealing punishable by death. It did not manage to collect the required 100,000 signatures for a binding national referendum.

In August 2010, the family members of a murder victim launched a new constitutional amendment initiative proposing the introduction of capital punishment in cases involving murder combined with sexual violence. The initiative quickly found itself at the centre of public attention and was roundly rejected by political leaders; it was withdrawn a day after its official publication.
