= Paul Irniger =

Swiss serial killer (1913–1939)

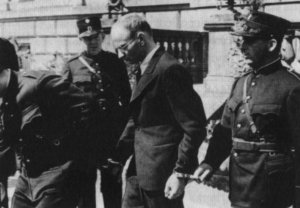
- Born: 4 November 1913; Goldau, Canton of Schwyz, Switzerland
- Died: 25 August 1939 (aged 25); Zug, Canton of Zug, Switzerland
- Cause of death: Execution by guillotine
- Status: Executed
- Conviction: Murder (3 counts)
- Penalty: Death

Details
- Victims: 3
- Span of crimes: 1933–1937
- Country: Switzerland
- Date apprehended: 9 August 1937

Paul Irniger (4 November 1913 – 25 August 1939) was a Swiss serial killer. He was the last person to be sentenced to death and executed in Switzerland after a criminal trial in the canton of Zug and the penultimate non-military execution in Switzerland, preceding Hans Vollenweider. He is also the last person sentenced to death in several cantons, before a new Penal Code, without capital punishment for civilian crimes, was adopted in 1942.

== Life ==
Irniger's mother had several criminal records for fraud and other offences. After the early death of his father, the six-year-old grew up in the Walterswil children's home. As a teenager, he tried several times, unsuccessfully, to enter a monastery. After working as an unskilled worker in Baden, he began an apprenticeship as a technical draftsman, which he broke off after a few months. He went to Interlaken, where he found a job in the Hotel Beau-Rivage, but started a small fire there. Subsequently, he was admitted to the forced education institution in Aarburg, where he learned to be a carpenter. After his release, he graduated from the recruit school in Lucerne.

On 5 December 1933, Irniger took the train to Zug and from there took a taxi in the direction of Baar. He shot the taxi driver near Baar and fled with a loot of 60 francs. Shortly afterwards, he was arrested for fraud and sent to the Sedel prison in Lucerne. Irniger managed to escape; he went to Einsiedeln, where he, disguised as a Trappist priest, read masses and made confessions in various churches. After the imposture was discovered, Irniger was imprisoned for a few months; a connection to the murder in Baar was not recognized.

After his release from prison, Irniger went to Ticino, where he met a woman and tried his hand at selling vacuum cleaners. He also committed various break-ins. On 9 August 1937, he was arrested in Rapperswil and taken to the police station. There, he shot a police officer and fled towards Lake Zürich, with various people chasing him. On the run, Irniger also shot one of his pursuers but was then caught by the angry population.

Irniger was brought to St. Gallen, where, in addition to the two homicides committed in Rapperswil, he also confessed to the murder in Baar. He was brought to justice and sentenced to death for the murders in Rapperswil in April 1938, but pardoned by the Grand Council of the Canton of St. Gallen to life imprisonment.

Since criminal law in Switzerland was a matter for the cantons before 1942, Irniger could only be convicted in St. Gallen for the crimes committed in that canton. In the trial for the murder in Baar, Irniger was also sentenced to death in the canton of Zug. He withdrew his appeal to the higher court itself and waived a petition for clemency so that the judgment in the first instance became final. Irniger was then executed on 25 August 1939 in the prison in Zug using the guillotine borrowed from Lucerne.

== Aftermath ==
On 9 June 1983, at the request of Irniger's son, the federal court forbade the broadcasting of a radio documentary on the Irniger case with reference to the protection of the privacy of his immediate relatives, which would be much more impaired by spreading the case on the radio than by other forms of publication.

The canton of Zug received letters of application from 186 volunteers who volunteered to be executioners. The psychiatrist Boris Pritzker conducted extensive interviews with 115 of them. The anonymous executioner selected from these volunteers, known as Arthur X., later fell ill with paranoid schizophrenia and died in 1960 in the Burghölzli psychiatric clinic. Pritzker's conversations with the executioner candidates were first published in 1993. On the basis of the letters of application and Pritzker's interviews, the play "The Last Executioner" was performed in Zug in 1998.
