= 1967 Swiss real estate referendum =

Referendum in Switzerland

2 July 1967
- Referendum against land speculation

Results
Choice	Votes	%
Yes	192,991	32.69%
No	397,303	67.31%
Valid votes	590,294	97.65%
Invalid or blank votes	14,178	2.35%
Total votes	604,472	100.00%
Registered voters/turnout	1,591,621	37.98%

A referendum on real estate was held in Switzerland on 2 July 1967. Voters were asked whether they approved of a popular initiative against real estate speculation. The proposal was rejected by a majority of voters and cantons.

== Background ==
The referendum was a popular initiative, which required a double majority; a majority of the popular vote and majority of the cantons. The decision of each canton was based on the vote in that canton. Full cantons counted as one vote, whilst half cantons counted as half.

== Results ==
Choice	Popular vote		Cantons		
Choice	Votes	%	Full	Half	Total
For	192,991	32.7	1	0	1
Against	397,303	67.3	18	6	21
Blank votes	13,062	–	–	–	–
Invalid votes	1,116	–	–	–	–
Total	604,472	100	19	6	22
Registered voters/turnout	1,591,621	38.0	–	–	–
Source: Nohlen & Stöver
