= 1961 Swiss referendums =

Four referendums were held in Switzerland in 1961. The first two were held on 5 March on an amendment to the constitution regarding oil pipelines and a fuel tax to fund national roads. The constitutional amendment was approved, but the fuel tax rejected. The third referendum was held on 22 October on a popular initiative on using popular initiatives for federal-level laws, and was rejected by voters. The fourth referendum was on a federal resolution on the clock industry, and was approved by two-thirds of voters.

== Results ==
=== March: Constitutional amendment ===
Choice	Popular vote		Cantons		
Choice	Votes	%	Full	Half	Total
For	644,797	71.4	19	6	22
Against	257,847	28.6	0	0	0
Blank votes	35,198	–	–	–	–
Invalid votes	2,097	–	–	–	–
Total	939,939	100	19	6	22
Registered voters/turnout	1,496,380	62.8	–	–	–
Source: Nohlen & Stöver

=== March: Fuel tax ===
Choice	Votes	%
For	434,245	46.6
Against	498,602	53.4
Blank votes	11,649	–
Invalid votes	2,095	–
Total	946,591	100
Registered voters/turnout	1,496,380	63.3
Source: Nohlen & Stöver

=== October: Popular initiative ===
Choice	Popular vote		Cantons		
Choice	Votes	%	Full	Half	Total
For	170,842	29.4	0	0	0
Against	409,445	70.6	19	6	22
Blank votes	21,082	–	–	–	–
Invalid votes	1,148	–	–	–	–
Total	602,517	100	19	6	22
Registered voters/turnout	1,502,509	40.1	–	–	–
Source: Nohlen & Stöver

=== December: Clock industry ===
Choice	Votes	%
For	443,483	66.7
Against	221,379	33.3
Blank votes	24,253	–
Invalid votes	1,239	–
Total	690,624	100
Registered voters/turnout	1,505,074	45.9
Source: Nohlen & Stöver
