= 1929 Swiss referendums =

Five referendums

Five referendums were held in Switzerland during 1929. The first three were held on 3 March on the issues of grain supply (a proposal and counter-proposal) and a federal law on tariffs. The counter-proposal to the grain supply question and the tariffs law were both approved. The fourth and fifth referendums were held on 12 May on popular initiatives on road traffic and banning spirits. Both were rejected by voters.

== Background ==
The grain supply, road traffic and spirits referendums were popular initiatives, which required a double majority; a majority of the popular vote and majority of the cantons. The decision of each canton was based on the vote in that canton. Full cantons counted as one vote, whilst half cantons counted as half. The tariffs law question was an optional referendum, requiring only a majority of voters in favour.

== Results ==
=== Grain supply ===
Choice	Popular vote		Cantons		
Choice	Votes	%	Full	Half	Total
For	18,487	2.7	0	0	0
Against	672,004	97.3	19	6	22
Blank votes	15,926	–	–	–	–
Invalid votes	9,446	–	–	–	–
Total	720,983	100	19	6	22
Registered voters/turnout	1,071,934	67.3	–	–	–
Source: Nohlen & Stöver

=== Grain supply counterproposal ===
Choice	Popular vote		Cantons		
Choice	Votes	%	Full	Half	Total
For	461,176	66.8	18	6	21
Against	228,357	33.1	1	0	1
No answer	958	0.1	–	–	–
Blank votes	15,926	–	–	–	–
Invalid votes	9,446	–	–	–	–
Total	715,863	100	19	6	22
Registered voters/turnout	1,071,934	66.8	–	–	–
Source: Direct Democracy

=== Tariffs law ===
Choice	Votes	%
For	454,535	66.4
Against	229,801	33.6
Blank votes	34,359	–
Invalid votes	2,288	–
Total	720,983	100
Registered voters/turnout	1,071,934	67.3
Source: Nohlen & Stöver

=== Road traffic initiative ===
Choice	Popular vote		Cantons		
Choice	Votes	%	Full	Half	Total
For	248,350	37.2	2	2	3
Against	420,082	62.8	17	4	19
Blank votes	29,684	–	–	–	–
Invalid votes	2,163	–	–	–	–
Total	700,279	100	19	6	22
Registered voters/turnout	1,075,950	65.1	–	–	–
Source: Nohlen & Stöver

=== Spirits ban ===
Choice	Popular vote		Cantons		
Choice	Votes	%	Full	Half	Total
For	226,794	32.7	0	1	0.5
Against	467,724	67.3	19	5	21.5
Blank votes	18,274	–	–	–	–
Invalid votes	1,718	–	–	–	–
Total	714,510	100	19	6	22
Registered voters/turnout	1,075,950	66.4	–	–	–
Source: Nohlen & Stöver
