= 1976 Swiss referendums =

Ten referendums were held in Switzerland in 1976. The first two were held on 21 March on popular initiatives "for employees' participation" (with a counter-proposal; both were rejected), and "for taxation reform" (also rejected). The next three were held on 13 June on a federal law on spatial planning (rejected), a CHF 200 million loan to the International Development Association (rejected), and renewing unemployment insurance (approved).

Two referendums were held on 26 September on an amendment to the Swiss Federal Constitution on broadcasting (rejected) and a popular initiative "for liability insurance by the union for motor vehicles and bicycless" (rejected). The final three referendums were held on 5 December on monetary policy (approved), price monitoring (approved) and a popular initiative to introduce a 40-hour working week (rejected).

== Results ==
=== March: Employees' participation ===
Choice	Popular initiative					Counterproposal				
Choice	Popular vote		Cantons			Popular vote		Cantons		
Choice	Votes	%	Full	Half	Total	Votes	%	Full	Half	Total
For	472,094	32.4	0	0	0	431,690	29.6	0	0	0
Against	966,140	66.3	19	6	22	974,695	66.9	0	0	0
No answer	19,725	1.4	–	–	–	51,574	3.5	–	–	–
Blank votes	15,198	–	–	–	–	15,198	–	–	–	–
Invalid votes	6,248	–	–	–	–	6,248	–	–	–	–
Total	1,479,405	100	19	6	22	1,479,405	100	19	6	22
Registered voters/turnout	3,750,162	39.4	–	–	–	3,750,162	39.4	–	–	–
Source: Direct Democracy

=== March: Taxation reform ===
Choice	Votes	%
For	599,053	42.2
Against	819,830	57.8
Blank votes	53,291	–
Invalid votes	1,911	–
Total	1,474,085	100
Registered voters/turnout	3,750,162	39.3
Source: Nohlen & Stöver

=== June: Spatial planning ===
Choice	Votes	%
For	626,134	48.9
Against	654,233	51.1
Blank votes	17,061	–
Invalid votes	1,237	–
Total	1,298,665	100
Registered voters/turnout	3,756,474	34.6
Source: Nohlen & Stöver

=== June: General tariff ===
Choice	Votes	%
For	646,687	48.2
Against	694,252	51.8
Blank votes	26,004	–
Invalid votes	1,589	–
Total	1,368,532	100
Registered voters/turnout	3,756,474	34.5
Source: Nohlen & Stöver

=== June: Unemployment insurance ===
Choice	Popular vote		Cantons		
Choice	Votes	%	Full	Half	Total
For	866,211	68.3	18	6	21
Against	402,550	31.7	1	0	1
Blank votes	26,901	–	–	–	–
Invalid votes	1,312	–	–	–	–
Total	1,296,974	100	19	6	22
Registered voters/turnout	3,756,474	34.5	–	–	–
Source: Nohlen & Stöver

=== September: Constitutional amendment on broadcasting ===
Choice	Popular vote		Cantons		
Choice	Votes	%	Full	Half	Total
For	531,328	43.3	3	1	3.5
Against	696,039	56.7	16	5	18.5
Blank votes	33,027	–	–	–	–
Invalid votes	1,586	–	–	–	–
Total	1,261,980	100	19	6	22
Registered voters/turnout	3,766,161	33.5	–	–	–
Source: Nohlen & Stöver

=== September: Liability insurance ===
Choice	Popular vote		Cantons		
Choice	Votes	%	Full	Half	Total
For	301,587	24.3	0	0	0
Against	939,713	75.7	19	6	22
Blank votes	20,543	–	–	–	–
Invalid votes	1,355	–	–	–	–
Total	1,263,198	100	19	6	22
Registered voters/turnout	3,766,161	33.5	–	–	–
Source: Nohlen & Stöver

=== December: Monetary policy ===
Choice	Popular vote		Cantons		
Choice	Votes	%	Full	Half	Total
For	1,108,413	70.3	19	6	22
Against	467,253	29.7	0	0	0
Blank votes	112,847	–	–	–	–
Invalid votes	2,998	–	–	–	–
Total	1,691,511	100	19	6	22
Registered voters/turnout	3,772,466	44.8	–	–	–
Source: Nohlen & Stöver

=== December: Price monitoring ===
Choice	Popular vote		Cantons		
Choice	Votes	%	Full	Half	Total
For	1,365,788	82.0	19	6	22
Against	299,367	18.0	0	0	0
Blank votes	32,177	–	–	–	–
Invalid votes	2,286	–	–	–	–
Total	1,699,618	100	19	6	22
Registered voters/turnout	3,772,466	45.1	–	–	–
Source: Nohlen & Stöver

=== December: 40-hour working week ===
Choice	Popular vote		Cantons		
Choice	Votes	%	Full	Half	Total
For	370,228	22.0	0	0	0
Against	1,315,822	78.0	19	6	22
Blank votes	15,309	–	–	–	–
Invalid votes	2,140	–	–	–	–
Total	1,703,499	100	19	6	22
Registered voters/turnout	3,772,466	45.2	–	–	–
Source: Nohlen & Stöver
