= 1925 Swiss referendums =

Three referendums were held in Switzerland during 1925. The first was held on 24 May on a popular initiative calling for insurance for invalidity, old age and bereavement, and was rejected by voters. The second was held on 25 October on a federal resolution on the settlement and residence of foreigners, and was approved by a majority of voters and cantons. The third was held on 6 December on a federal resolution on insurance for invalidity, old age and bereavement, and was also approved by a majority of voters and cantons.

== Background ==
The May referendum was a popular initiative, which required a double majority; a majority of the popular vote and majority of the cantons. The decision of each canton was based on the vote in that canton. Full cantons counted as one vote, whilst half cantons counted as half. The October and December referendums were both "obligatory" referendums, which also required a double majority.

== Results ==
=== May referendum ===
Choice	Popular vote		Cantons		
Choice	Votes	%	Full	Half	Total
For	282,527	42.0	5	2	6
Against	390,129	58.0	14	4	16
Blank votes	13,577	–	–	–	–
Invalid votes	2,169	–	–	–	–
Total	688,402	100	19	6	22
Registered voters/turnout	1,008,865	68.2	–	–	–
Source: Nohlen & Stöver

=== October referendum ===
This was the 100th national referendum in the Swiss Confederation since 1848.

Choice	Popular vote		Cantons		
Choice	Votes	%	Full	Half	Total
For	382,381	62.2	16	5	18.5
Against	232,272	37.8	3	1	3.5
Blank votes	71,838	–	–	–	–
Invalid votes	5,053	–	–	–	–
Total	691,544	100	19	6	22
Registered voters/turnout	1,017,692	68.0	–	–	–
Source: Nohlen & Stöver

=== December referendum ===
Choice	Popular vote		Cantons		
Choice	Votes	%	Full	Half	Total
For	410,988	65.4	15	3	16.5
Against	217,483	34.6	4	3	5.5
Blank votes	12,809	–	–	–	–
Invalid votes	1,786	–	–	–	–
Total	643,066	100	19	6	22
Registered voters/turnout	1,019,522	63.1	–	–	–
Source: Nohlen & Stöver
