= 1993 Swiss referendums =

Sixteen referendums were held in Switzerland in 1993.

== History ==
The first three were held on 7 March on a federal law to raise fuel taxes (approved), a federal resolution on lifting the ban on gambling establishments (approved) and a popular initiative on banning animal testing (rejected). The next two were held on 6 June on two popular initiatives; "40 military training areas are enough–environment projection at military" and "for a Switzerland without new warplanes". Both were rejected by voters.

The next set of five referendums was held on 26 September on a federal resolution on the misuse of weaponry (approved), whether Laufen should be part of the Basel-Landschaft canton (approved), a popular initiative on creating a new Swiss National Day on 1 August (approved), a federal resolution on a temporary halt to increase in the cost of health insurance (approved) and a federal resolution on unemployment insurance (approved).

The final set of six referendums was held on 28 November on federal resolutions on the financial order (approved), recovering money owed to the federal government (approved), measures for preserving social insurance (approved) and special excise taxes (approved), as well as popular initiatives "on the reduction of alcohol problems" and "on the reduction of tobacco problems", both of which were rejected.

== Results ==
Month	Question	For		Against		Blank/invalid		Total	Registered voters	Turnout	Cantons for		Cantons against	
Month	Question	Votes	%	Votes	%	Blank	Invalid	Total	Registered voters	Turnout	Full	Half	Full	Half
March	Raising fuel taxes	1,259,373	54.5	1,051,067	45.5	19,307	4,086	2,333,833	4,551,493	51.3				
March	Abolishing the ban on gambling establishments	1,665,454	72.5	632,998	27.5	29,343	4,707	2,332,502	4,551,493	51.2	20	6	0	0
March	Banning animal testing	634,758	27.8	1,651,333	72.2	40,830	4,832	2,331,753	4,551,493	51.2	0	0	20	6
June	Environmental protection	1,124,893	44.7	1,390,812	55.3	14,715	3,584	2,534,004	4,559,258	55.6	6	2	14	4
June	Ban on new warplanes	1,074,661	42.8	1,435,744	57.2	20,077	3,738	2,534,220	4,559,258	55.6	3	2	17	4
September	Federal resolution on weaponry	1,539,782	86.3	245,026	13.7	27,262	2,593	1,814,663	4,553,754	39.8	20	6	0	0
September	Laufen and Basel-Landschaft	1,188,941	75.2	392,893	24.8	209,883	6,830	1,798,547	4,553,754	39.5	20	6	0	0
September	Swiss National Day	1,492,285	83.8	289,122	16.2	32,226	2,795	1,816,428	4,553,754	39.9	20	6	0	0
September	Health insurance costs	1,416,209	80.5	342,002	19.5	50,400	2,971	1,811,582	4,553,754	39.8				
September	Unemployment insurance	1,225,069	70.4	515,113	29.6	66,321	3,245	1,809,748	4,553,754	39.7				
November	Financial order	1,347,400	66.7	674,031	33.3	48,433	3,330	2,073,194	4,565,751	45.4	19	6	1	0
November	Recovering money owed to the federal government	1,163,887	57.7	852,439	42.3	52,257	3,369	2,071,952	4,565,751	45.4	15	6	5	0
November	Protecting social insurance	1,258,782	62.6	752,472	37.4	57,503	3,526	2,072,283	4,565,751	45.4	19	6	1	0
November	Excise taxes	1,212,002	60.6	786,396	39.4	70,176	3,634	2,072,208	4,565,751	45.4	17	6	3	0
November	Reduction of alcohol problems	516,054	25.3	1,527,165	74.7	30,516	3,073	2,076,808	4,565,751	45.5	0	0	20	6
November	Reduction of tobacco problems	521,433	25.5	1,521,885	74.5	30,999	2,988	2,077,305	4,565,751	45.5	0	0	20	6
Source: Nohlen
