= 1879 Swiss referendums =

Two referendums were held in Switzerland in January and May 1879. A federal law on subsidies for railways in the Alps was passed by 70.7% of voters on 19 January, whilst a referendum on abolishing the constitutional ban on the death penalty on 18 May was passed by 52.5% of voters and a majority of cantons. Following the vote, ten of the 26 cantons reintroduced the death penalty during the 1880s and 1890s and nine executions occurred before its nationwide abolition in 1938, when a new criminal code (which overrode cantonal penal codes) was approved in a referendum.

== Background ==
The January referendum on rail subsidies was classed as an optional referendum, which meant that only a majority of the public vote was required for the proposals to be approved. The referendum on the death penalty involved amending article 65 of the federal constitution, and was a mandatory referendum, which required both a majority of voters and cantons to approve the proposals.

== Results ==
=== Federal law on rail subsidies ===
Choice	Votes	%
For	278,731	70.7
Against	115,571	29.3
Invalid/blank votes		–
Total	394,302	100
Registered voters/turnout	636,996	
Source: Nohlen & Stöver

=== Constitutional amendment on the death penalty ===
Choice	Popular vote		Cantons		
Choice	Votes	%	Full	Half	Total
For	200,485	52.5	13	4	15
Against	181,588	47.5	6	2	7
Invalid/blank votes		–	–	–	–
Total	351,606	100	19	6	22
Registered voters/turnout	633,138		–	–	–
Source: Nohlen & Stöver
