= 1941 Swiss alcohol referendum =

Referendum in Switzerland

9 March 1941
- Reorganization of the alcohol industry

Results
Choice	Votes	%
Yes	304,867	40.23%
No	452,873	59.77%
Valid votes	757,740	97.79%
Invalid or blank votes	17,103	2.21%
Total votes	774,843	100.00%
Registered voters/turnout	1,261,361	61.43%

A referendum on alcohol was held in Switzerland on 9 March 1941. Voters were asked whether they approved of a popular initiative for changing the alcohol order. The proposal was rejected by 59.8% of voters.

== Background ==
The referendum was a "process initiating decision", which required only a majority of the public vote, rather than both a majority of the public votes and a majority of cantons in favour.

== Results ==
Choice	Votes	%
For	304,867	40.2
Against	452,873	59.8
Blank votes	14,681	–
Invalid votes	2,422	–
Total	774,843	100
Registered voters/turnout	1,261,361	61.4
Source: Nohlen & Stöver
