= 1937 Swiss freemasonry referendum =

Popular initiative vote in Switzerland

28 November 1937
- Prohibition of Freemasonry

Results
Choice	Votes	%
Yes	234,980	31.32%
No	515,327	68.68%
Valid votes	750,307	95.81%
Invalid or blank votes	32,809	4.19%
Total votes	783,116	100.00%
Registered voters/turnout	1,187,637	65.94%

A referendum on freemasonry was held in Switzerland on 28 November 1937. Voters were asked whether they approved of a popular initiative that would ban the practice. The proposal was rejected by a majority of voters and cantons.

== Background ==
The referendum was a popular initiative, which required a double majority; a majority of the popular vote and majority of the cantons. The decision of each canton was based on the vote in that canton. Full cantons counted as one vote, whilst half cantons counted as half.

== Results ==
Choice	Popular vote		Cantons		
Choice	Votes	%	Full	Half	Total
For	234,980	31.3	1	0	1
Against	515,327	68.7	18	6	21
Blank votes	30,578	–	–	–	–
Invalid votes	2,231	–	–	–	–
Total	783,116	100	19	6	22
Registered voters/turnout	1,187,637	65.9	–	–	–
Source: Nohlen & Stöver
