= 1893 Swiss animal protection referendum =

Referendum in Switzerland

20 August 1893
- Federal popular initiative 'for a ban on slaughter without prior stunning'

Results
Choice	Votes	%
Yes	191,527	60.11%
No	127,101	39.89%
Valid votes	318,628	96.85%
Invalid or blank votes	10,355	3.15%
Total votes	328,983	100.00%
Registered voters/turnout	668,913	49.18%

A referendum on animal protection was held in Switzerland on 20 August 1893. Voters were asked whether they approved of prohibiting butchering without the animals being anaesthetised. The proposal was approved by 60.1% of voters and a narrow majority of cantons.

== Background ==
The referendum was a popular initiative, forced by the collection of 100,000 signatures. As it involved changing the constitution, a double majority of both votes and cantons was required for the proposal to pass.

== Results ==
Choice	Popular vote		Cantons		
Choice	Votes	%	Full	Half	Total
For	191,527	60.1	10	3	11.5
Against	127,101	39.9	9	3	10.5
Blank votes	8,600	–	–	–	–
Invalid votes	1,755	–	–	–	–
Total	328,983	100	19	6	22
Registered voters/turnout	668,913	49.2	–	–	–
Source: Nohlen & Stöver
