= Hans Vollenweider =

Swiss criminal (1908–1940)

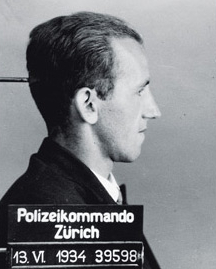
- Hans Vollenweider's mugshot
- Born: February 11, 1908; Zurich, Switzerland
- Died: October 18, 1940 (aged 32); Sarnen, Switzerland
- Status: Executed by guillotine
- Convictions: Murder (3 counts); Bank robbery
- Penalty: Death

Details
- Victims: 3
- Date: June 1940
- Country: Switzerland

Hans Vollenweider (11 February 1908 – 18 October 1940) was a Swiss criminal. He was the last person to be sentenced to death and executed by a civilian court in Switzerland.

Vollenweider was born in Zurich. In 1936, he committed a bank robbery and was sentenced to 2.5 years in prison. He remained incarcerated after his sentence was over, because he was considered dangerous. One day he was able to escape and after nine days he was captured on 23 June 1939. During these nine days, he fatally shot the driver Hermann Zwyssig, the postman Emil Stoll, and the policeman Alois von Moos. After being held in several prisons in different cantons, the cantonal court of Obwalden sentenced him to death on 19 September 1940. Appeal and a request for clemency were rejected. As the death penalty in Switzerland was already scheduled to be abolished on 1 January 1942, the judgment was controversial.

One month later, on the morning of 18 October 1940, Hans Vollenweider was executed in Sarnen in the workshop of the prison with a guillotine borrowed from Lucerne. The offender refused last words and last meal as well as spiritual support.

He was the last person to be executed using a guillotine in Switzerland.
