= 1938 Swiss referendums =

Six referendums were held in Switzerland during 1938. The first four were held on 20 February; the first on amending articles 107 and 116 of the constitution to make Romansch an official language, which was approved by over 90% of voters and all cantons. The second was on a popular initiative "on urgent federal resolutions and the protection of people's rights" and was rejected by 85% of voters. The third was on a popular initiative on the private arms industry, and was also rejected by a wide margin, whilst the fourth was on a counter-proposal to the arms industry question, and was approved by voters. The fifth referendum was held on 3 July on the penal code, and was approved. The sixth and final referendum of the year was held on 27 November on a federal resolution on the transient order of the federal budget, and was approved by 72% of voters.

== Background ==
The referendums on making Romansch an official language and the federal budget were both "obligatory" referendums, requiring a double majority; a majority of the popular vote and majority of the cantons. The decision of each canton was based on the vote in that canton. Full cantons counted as one vote, whilst half cantons counted as half. The popular initiatives on federal resolutions and the arms industry also required a double majority, as did the counter proposal to the arms industry question. The referendum on the penal code was an "optional referendum", which required only a majority of voters in favour. Most notably, it abolished the death penalty in times of peace and legalized consensual same-sex acts.

== Results ==
=== February: Romansch as an official language ===
Choice	Popular vote		Cantons		
Choice	Votes	%	Full	Half	Total
For	574,991	91.6	19	6	22
Against	52,827	8.4	0	0	0
Blank votes	24,692	–	–	–	–
Invalid votes	8,512	–	–	–	–
Total	661,022	100	19	6	22
Registered voters/turnout	1,216,756	54.3	–	–	–
Source: Nohlen & Stöver

=== February: popular initiative on federal resolutions ===
Choice	Popular vote		Cantons		
Choice	Votes	%	Full	Half	Total
For	87,638	15.2	0	0	0
Against	488,195	84.8	19	6	22
Blank votes	63,433	–	–	–	–
Invalid votes	21,756	–	–	–	–
Total	661,022	100	19	6	22
Registered voters/turnout	1,216,756	54.3	–	–	–
Source: Nohlen & Stöver

=== February: popular initiative on the private arms industry ===
Choice	Popular vote		Cantons		
Choice	Votes	%	Full	Half	Total
For	65,938	11.5	0	0	0
Against	419,013	73.2	19	6	22
No answer	87,630	15.3	–	–	–
Blank votes	52,896	–	–	–	–
Invalid votes	35,542	–	–	–	–
Total	661,022	100	19	6	22
Registered voters/turnout	1,216,756	54.3	–	–	–
Source: Direct Democracy

=== February: Counter-proposal on the private arms industry ===
Choice	Popular vote		Cantons		
Choice	Votes	%	Full	Half	Total
For	394,052	68.8	19	6	22
Against	149,025	26.0	0	0	0
No answer	29,504	15.3	–	–	–
Blank votes	52,896	–	–	–	–
Invalid votes	35,542	–	–	–	–
Total	661,022	100	19	6	22
Registered voters/turnout	1,216,756	54.3	–	–	–
Source: Direct Democracy

=== July: Penal code ===
Choice	Votes	%
For	358,438	53.5
Against	312,030	46.5
Blank votes	23,455	–
Invalid votes	2,016	–
Total	695,939	100
Registered voters/turnout	1,219,755	57.1
Source: Nohlen & Stöver

=== November: Federal budget ===
Choice	Popular vote		Cantons		
Choice	Votes	%	Full	Half	Total
For	509,387	72.3	18	6	21
Against	195,538	27.7	1	0	1
Blank votes	30,951	–	–	–	–
Invalid votes	2,431	–	–	–	–
Total	738,307	100	19	6	22
Registered voters/turnout	1,223,336	60.4	–	–	–
Source: Nohlen & Stöver
