= 1874 Swiss constitutional referendum =

19 April 1874
- Total revision of the Constitution

Results
Choice	Votes	%
Yes	340,199	63.21%
No	198,013	36.79%
Valid votes	538,212	100.00%
Invalid or blank votes	0	0.00%
Total votes	538,212	100.00%

A constitutional referendum was held in Switzerland on 19 April 1874. The new constitution was approved by 63.2% of voters and a majority of cantons. It gave more responsibilities and powers to the federal government.

== Background ==
In order to pass, any amendments to the constitution needed a double majority; a majority of the popular vote and majority of the cantons. The decision of each canton was based on the vote in that canton. Full cantons counted as one vote, whilst half cantons counted as half.

== Results ==
Choice	Popular vote		Cantons		
Choice	Votes	%	Full	Half	Total
For	340,199	63.2	12	3	13.5
Against	190,013	36.8	7	3	8.5
Invalid/blank votes		–	–	–	–
Total	538,212	100	19	6	22
Source: Nohlen & Stöver
