= Federal popular initiative =

Instrument of direct democracy in Switzerland

The federal popular initiative (German: Eidgenössische Volksinitiative, French: Initiative populaire fédérale, Italian: Iniziativa popolare federale, Romansh: Iniziativa federala dal pievel), is a Swiss civic right enabling 100,000 citizens with voting rights to propose a total or partial amendment to the Federal Constitution and submit it to a popular vote. The citizens behind the initiative, grouped together in an initiative committee, have 18 months in which to gather the approval of 100,000 citizens. To do this, the 100,000 citizens must affix their handwritten signatures to a signature list, including the text and title of the popular initiative. If 100,000 signatures are collected within 18 months, the initiative is put to the vote. If this is not the case, the initiative is declared "unsuccessful" and the procedure is terminated. The right of initiative also has its counterpart at cantonal and communal level; the procedure, including the number of signatures required and the deadline for collecting them, varies from one sovereign Swiss canton to another.

First used in 1893, the federal popular initiative has gradually developed over time to become one of the main means of expression for political parties or groups, used to bring about constitutional change without having to consult or obtain the approval of the federal authorities. From its inception to 2018, 215 such votes were held, an average of 1.69 per year. Although unlikely to be successful (around 10% of popular initiatives put to the vote are accepted), the federal popular initiative makes it possible to provoke public debate on issues that are not always addressed in traditional parliamentary debates. In addition, the federal parliament may oppose the initiative with a direct or indirect counter-proposal, which may or may not take up part of the initiative's demands.

From time to time, the advantages and disadvantages of the federal popular initiative are debated: public awareness of certain issues and the possibility of making demands that go beyond the priorities set by the authorities are set against the risk of this tool being used by demagogic and well-organized groups, and the considerable financial resources required for the popular vote campaign.

== Definition ==
Federal popular initiatives since 1891 As of 3 April 2025
Popular initiatives launched (539)
| Successful | 370 |
| Unsuccessful | 153 |
| At the signature gathering stage | 16 |
Successful popular initiatives (370)
| Voted on | 235 |
| Withdrawn | 108 |
| Classified | 2 |
| Declared null and void | 4 |
| Pending (Federal Council, Parliament or ready for vote) | 20 |
Voted on (235)
| Accepted by the people and cantons | 26 |

The most widely used form of federal popular initiative is a procedure whereby 100,000 Swiss citizens can draft a new constitutional article, or amend an existing one, and submit this constitutional amendment to a vote of the people and the cantons. The initiative is presented in the form of a draft bill. The popular initiative also exists in other forms, but these are rarely used in practice (initiative requesting a total revision of the Constitution, and initiative presented in the form of a general draft). It is formally defined in Articles 138 and 139 of the Federal Constitution. In practical terms, a federal popular initiative can therefore take three different forms:

- A request for a complete revision of the Constitution, which, if accepted by a simple majority of the people, leads to the re-election of Parliament, which is then tasked with drafting a new Federal Constitution.
- The popular initiative presented in the form of a general project: the initiative's request, formulated in general terms, is examined by the Federal Assembly, which can decide to approve or reject it. If it approves, the Federal Assembly drafts the constitutional amendment in line with the initiative's request, and submits it to the vote of the people and the cantons. If it rejects the initiative's request, it submits it to the vote of the people, who decide whether to act on it. In the event of acceptance by the people, the Federal Assembly draws up a constitutional amendment in line with the initiative's request.
- A popular initiative in the form of a draft proposal: instead of a request conceived in general terms, which must then be put into practice by Parliament, this type of initiative is a proposal for constitutional amendment drafted directly by the initiative committee. The text of the initiative cannot be modified by either Parliament or the Federal Council. In order to be accepted, an initiative of this type requires a double majority of the people and the cantons; in this case, the new text is incorporated directly into the Constitution.

The federal popular initiative is a tool specifically designed to propose amendments to the Federal Constitution. It does not have the power to directly modify federal laws or lower-level regulations. However, a successful popular initiative that alters or introduces a constitutional article may necessitate subsequent legal changes. This is true if the newly approved article includes provisions that are not self-executing (i.e., do not directly take effect without further legislation). In such cases, the popular initiative indirectly prompts amendments to federal laws, as these amendments would be required to implement the new constitutional article.

In the vast majority of cases, federal popular initiatives are presented in the form of a draft proposal. Of the 150 or so federal popular initiatives put to the vote before the end of the 20th century, only two were accepted by Parliament in the form of a general draft, and four (out of a total of 11 proposals) were put to the vote (for the revision of the alcohol regime in 1937, for a new business tax in 1951, for the fight against alcoholism in 1963 and for tax reform in 1974). Requests for complete revision are even less frequent: three attempts were unsuccessful (in 1851, 1866 and 2003), while the fourth was rejected by the people on 8 September, 1935.

=== General popular initiative ===
A fourth type of initiative has existed for only a few years, but has never been used. When the Constitution was revised in 1999, a new form of initiative was defined, called the "general popular initiative", which allows "the adoption, modification or repeal of constitutional or legislative provisions", but only in the form of a proposal conceived in general terms. The aim of introducing this new type of popular initiative was to offer citizens the possibility of amending federal laws without having to go through a constitutional amendment. The initiative was created following the vote of 9 February, 2003; however, it was withdrawn on 27 September 2009, only six years after its creation, without having been used.

=== Complementary initiative ===
At the end of 2019, the municipality of Sion in southwestern Switzerland launched an experiment in participatory democracy, based on the model of the Citizens' Initiative Review already tested in the US state of Oregon. The main aim of this initiative was to encourage democratic debate. Twenty participants were randomly selected from Sion's electorate on the basis of gender, age, political orientation, level of education and history of electoral participation, to be representative of the population. This panel of 20 people met over two weekends to debate, inform themselves and exchange views with experts, supporters and opponents of a federal project to be put to the vote. At the end of their work, they produced a one-page report summarizing the issues, the main arguments for and against, and their conclusions. The aim was to explain the subject of the vote "in a comprehensible and complete manner, without falling into simplification", to "respond to the current crisis of democracy by involving citizens".

=== Differences with petitions ===
The right of initiative is often confused with the right of petition. However, these two rights differ in at least four fundamental respects:

- An initiative is a proposal made by the people in their sovereign capacity, whereas a petition is a request to the authorities.
- An initiative must be supported by a defined number of citizens, whereas a petition can be submitted by a single person, who does not even have political rights.
- An initiative necessarily deals with a constitutional amendment (creation, modification or deletion of a constitutional article), whereas a petition can concern any subject.
- The Federal Assembly cannot choose whether or not to consider an initiative; it must do so, unlike a petition.

At the beginning of the 20th century, these differences prompted a number of political scientists to call for the universal right of petition, while at the same time limiting the right of popular initiative, which "does not have the same status" because it represents a danger if used by "extreme parties".

== History ==
=== Before 1848 ===
The first form of popular initiative in Switzerland dates back to the time of the French occupation, when it was introduced by the Constitution of Year I, 24 June 1793. (Note: The text is available on wikisource) However, it was only codified between 1831 and 1838, following the massive use of petitions that were to force the Regeneration, in the cantons of Aargau, Basel-Landschaft, Thurgau, Schaffhausen, Lucerne and St. Gallen, in the form of a request for total constitutional revision. The canton of Vaud was the first to introduce the popular legislative initiative, in 1845, when 8,000 citizens were given the opportunity to submit "any proposal" to the people.

=== From 1848 to 1891 ===
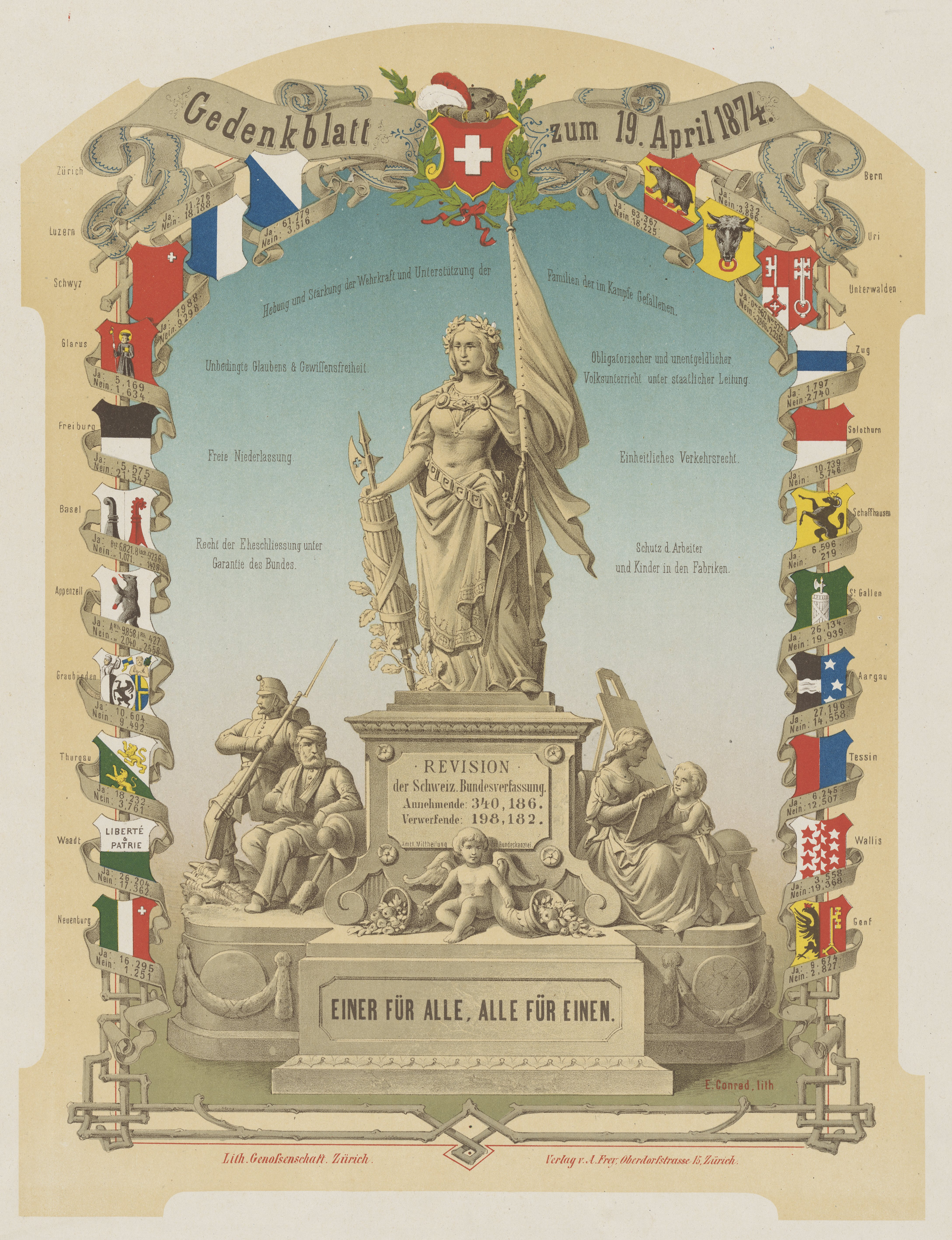
Cover page of the 1874 Constitution.

The Constitution establishing the federal state of 1848 did indeed provide for a right of popular initiative, but limited to a request, made by at least 50,000 citizens, for a revision of the constitution; the text did not specify, however, whether this revision should be total or partial; during the debates preceding approval of this text, a request for clarification along these lines was tabled by several cantons, but rejected as "superfluous" by the majority, who considered that both forms of revision were included.

In the 1860s, a few years after the one that had led to the 1848 Constitution, a new democratic upsurge took place in several cantons; directed against the nature and duration of political mandates, deemed excessive, it resulted in a sharp increase in cantonal democratic rights including, in addition to the appointment of authorities and control of the administration, popular and legislative initiative, as well as the lowering of the number of signatures and financial limits required and the end of counting abstentions as positive votes. This impetus was also to be found, albeit to a lesser extent, at federal level: the proposed Constitution of 1872, prompted in part by a popular initiative to recast the Constitution which failed to gather the necessary 50,000 signatures, provided for the rights of referendum and legislative initiative. This proposal, adopted by the Federal Assembly on 6 March 1872, was nonetheless deemed too centralizing, and was rejected by popular vote on 12 May 1872.

Once this revision had been rejected, federal parliamentarians went back to work to propose a new version of the Constitution in the summer of 1873: abandoning the legislative initiative and lowering the referendum threshold to 30,000 signatures were among the changes made to this new draft, which made no change to the right of federal popular initiative, and was still solely dedicated to the demand for a complete constitutional revision; the Radical Party tenors of the time, Emil Welti and Alfred Escher, preferred to focus their attacks on the referendum rather than calling into question the popular initiative. This new version was accepted by popular vote on 19 April, 1874, by 63.2% of voters and fourteen and a half cantons, against seven cantons and a half.

Demands for the extension of popular rights continued unabated after this change: a petition submitted in 1879 called for the introduction of the popular initiative at federal level. This was followed, the following year, by a federal initiative to amend article 39 of the Constitution on the issue of banknotes, justified by article 120 of the Constitution, which provides for the possibility of requesting a complete amendment of the Constitution by means of an initiative. In its message to the Federal Chambers of 18 August 1880, the Federal Council expressed its perplexity at this request, which it initially treated as a simple petition and recommended that it should ultimately be considered as a request for a complete revision of the Constitution; presented as such to the popular vote, it was rejected by a majority of almost 70% of voters.

Following the rejection of the right of initiative for a partial revision of the Constitution, coupled with the demand for a banknote monopoly in 1880: the right of federal legislative initiative, compulsory legislative referendum and even election of the Federal Council by the people were called for successively by Conservative Party deputies in a motion in 1884, and by the Grütli Association in a petition in 1889.

=== Voting in 1891 ===
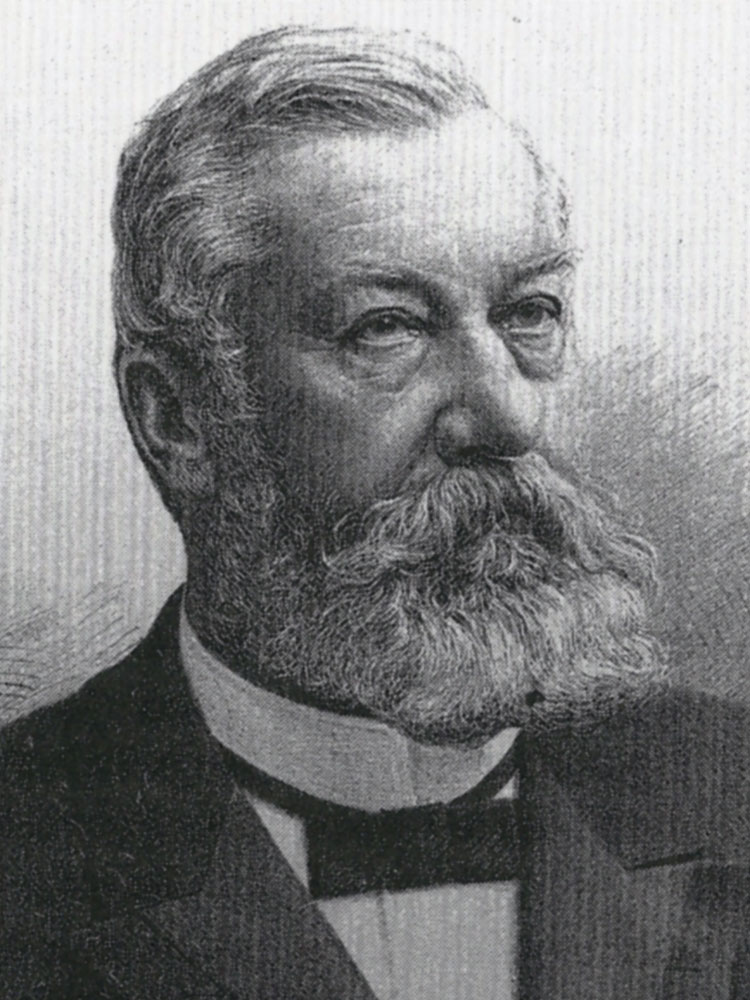
Portrait of Federal Councillor Joseph Zemp, main initiator of the 1891 law

Faced with these repeated requests, the National Council decided to clarify the situation and drew up a proposal based on a motion, allowing 50,000 citizens to request a partial revision of the Constitution, but only in general terms and presented by three conservative deputies: future Lucerne Federal Councillor Joseph Zemp and State Councillors Johann Joseph Keel of St. Gallen and Martino Pedrazzini of Ticino.

This first proposal, drafted by Karl Schenk and published on 13 June 1890, was not presented as a concession to political minorities: it was merely intended to respond to a practical problem in the functioning of federal institutions, and not to a demand for fundamental modification of the political principles put in place by the radical majority a few years earlier. It was accepted despite strong opposition from certain personalities, including in particular former Federal Councillor Jakob Dubs, who saw in it the ideal conditions for unleashing a "legal putsch".

Presented to the Council of States, the draft was amended to add the possibility of a drafted initiative which, if accepted, would pass directly into the Constitution; the chamber of cantons also provided for the possibility of the federal authorities presenting a counter-proposal to this drafted initiative. Back in the National Council, the new version of the draft was accepted by a narrow majority of 71 votes to 63, made up of conservatives and socialists, and thus put to a popular vote.

On 5 July 1891, the introduction of articles 121, 122 and 123 into the Federal Constitution defining the right of popular initiative was accepted by the electorate with a majority of 60%, but a turnout of less than 50%. According to Irène Muntwyler, this relatively low turnout for the time, and particularly for a subject of such importance, was due to the length and complexity of the debates, as well as the lack of clarity in the voting instructions issued by the various political movements; the low turnout was noted in particular in the Revue vaudoise, the quasi-official organ of the Radical Party, which noted that while "Switzerland is embarking [...] in a new direction", it "does so without enthusiasm", even in "indifference".

Although this innovation was largely based on tried-and-tested practices in the cantons, it was not going to please everyone. In 1893, Numa Droz, a federal councillor from Neuchâtel and an outspoken opponent of the popular initiative, wrote the following, which has gone down in history: "The contemporary history of Switzerland can be divided into three periods: that of parliamentarianism, from 1848 to 1874; that of democracy, following the federal revision of 1874, which established the optional referendum; and that of demagogy, which began two years ago with the introduction of the right of initiative for partial revision of the Constitution"; two days after the vote, the Neue Zürcher Zeitung drew an alarmist picture of the future: "Agitation, holding public and secret assemblies, collecting signatures, keeping [. of the people in continual agitation".

=== From 1891 to 1999 ===
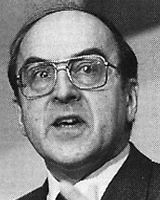
Portrait of Federal Councillor Kurt Furgler, the main initiator of changes to the right of initiative in the 1970s.

In the period following the enactment of the federal law on popular initiatives on 27 January 1892 and the beginning of the 21st century, the concept remained virtually unchanged, despite a few requests for material limitations in response to specific events. The modifications that did occur were confined to two specific areas: the number of signatures required to trigger an initiative and the timeframe allocated for federal authorities to process them.

==== Number of signatures required ====
Initially set at 50,000, the number of signatures required for a federal popular initiative came under regular attack from 1922 onwards: no fewer than five interpellations or postulates were tabled calling for an increase until 1972, when the Federal Department of Justice and Police organized a consultation on the subject; the results of this consultation were mixed: while the majority of cantons and major organizations were in favor of increasing the number of signatures, all the political parties in the center and on the left rejected the idea, advocating the status quo. Among the arguments most frequently put forward in favor of increasing the number of signatures were the introduction of women's suffrage (which, coupled with other extensions of the right to vote, reduced the 50,000 signature requirement from 7.6% of the electorate in 1891 to around 1.6% in 1970), the ever-increasing number of federal popular initiatives tabled, and initiatives against foreign overpopulation that some members of parliament deemed "inhumane".

It took several more parliamentary interventions before, in 1975, the government finally submitted a proposal doubling the number of signatures required for both the initiative and the referendum. In its message accompanying the proposal, the Federal Council noted that this amendment "consists merely of a pure and simple adaptation to conditions which have changed since 1874 and 1891 in terms of society and law" and "is not motivated by the desire to resolve the many problems posed [...] by the initiative and the referendum".

Slightly modified by Parliament (which reduced the number of signatures required to launch a referendum from 60,000 to 50,000), the bill was accepted by popular vote on 25 September, 1977 by 19 cantons and 56.7% of voters in the case of the initiative. However, it had no effect on the number of cases in which the federal popular initiative was used in subsequent years.

A new proposal by the Federal Council to increase the number of signatures required to 150,000 was rejected by the Federal Assembly during the 1999 revision of the Constitution.

==== Processing time ====
The period allowed for the authorities to process an initiative was initially set at one year by the law of 27 January 1892; in 1950, it was increased to three years from the date of submission of the initiative, following the opinion expressed by the Federal Council that the processing procedure required more time.

In 1962, the Law on Relations between the Councils came into force. This law set new deadlines of two years for the Federal Council (with the option of adding an extra year if necessary), and one year for the Federal Assembly. An additional optional year was also granted to the Federal Assembly on 14 March, 1974, should it decide to present a counter-proposal. In 1976, the optional year granted on request to the Federal Council became fixed, thus increasing the total ordinary processing time from three to four years. On 20 June, 1986, the distribution of deadlines within the four-year period was revised, with the Federal Council having two years to prepare its message (30 months in the event of a counter-proposal), the remainder being devolved to Parliament.

In 1989, an initiative "against delaying tactics in the processing of popular initiatives" called for the total time limit to be reduced to two years; however, the initiative failed to obtain the necessary number of signatures to succeed. A new popular initiative "for faster direct democracy" was launched in 1997 by the Denner distribution company, despite the fact that, following a new amendment to the law on 21 June, 1996, the overall deadline had been reduced to thirty months, with one year reserved for the Federal Council. Denouncing the fact that "all too often, for political and tactical reasons, popular initiatives lie dormant in drawers", the committee launched this initiative to "put an end to all the hanky-panky surrounding popular initiatives"; however, it was rejected in the vote on 12 March, 2000 by 70% of voters and all the cantons.

=== From 1999 to the present day ===
On 18 April, 1999, a majority of almost 60% of voters accepted a new Federal Constitution; this essentially cosmetic revision ruled out any far-reaching changes to constitutional structures, which were to be dealt with at a later date by means of partial amendments. However, in its 1997 message presenting the draft revision, the Federal Council also proposed an overhaul of popular rights: extending the initiative and referendum to internal acts and international treaties, while increasing the number of signatures required to 100,000 for the referendum and 150,000 for the initiative; Parliament refused to go ahead with this proposal, which it considered to be rather incoherent. However, the Council of States instructed its Political Institutions Committee to take from the proposal those ideas "likely to win a majority of votes in favor", with the aim of "eliminating the shortcomings of the current system" and "not facilitating or complicating the exercise of popular rights".

In 2001, the commission's work resulted in a report that retained a number of measures (the general popular initiative and the reduction of the signature-gathering period from 18 to 12 months), rejected others (increasing the number of signatures or the referendum on administrative acts) and proposed new ones (the possibility of accepting both the initiative and the counter-project). After both chambers had debated the report, the Federal Council reacted by proposing compromises on certain points, in particular the number of signatures required for a referendum. In the end, a modest proposal was put to the vote: the introduction of a general popular initiative, the possibility of appealing to the Federal Court in the event of disagreement over the wording of the initiative's texts, and a revision of the calculation of votes in the event of a "double-yes" to the initiative and its counter-proposal were among the main innovations representing the "lowest common denominator" between the two chambers.

Presented to the vote in the form of a single decree, the package of measures was accepted by a majority of 70.4% of voters and all the cantons on 9 February, 2003. However, and despite the rule that "constitutional amendments come into force as soon as they have been approved by the people and the cantons", it will still be several years before these various measures are actually applied, as they require the revision of several laws (on political rights, on Parliament or on the organization of the judiciary), a revision which can itself be challenged by referendum.

== Criticism and proposals for change ==
Since its implementation at federal level, the popular initiative has been the subject of much criticism, some of it diametrically opposed. While few changes have been made to its application, numerous proposals have been made over time to address these criticisms, with little success.

=== Number of initiatives ===
The multiplication of popular consultations over the last 30–40 years, particularly on identical subjects that recur periodically, has been seen as one reason for the gradual increase in the abstention rate, with voter turnout dropping from almost 70% at the beginning of the 20th century to less than 30% a century later. To solve this problem, and in response to a number of parliamentary interventions on the subject tabled mainly by Radical Party MPs, Fabio Pontiggia proposed in 1990 either to introduce a waiting period prohibiting the tabling of a federal popular initiative for a certain period of time, or to extend the period allowed to the federal authorities for an initiative dealing with an identical subject to that of a previous initiative, thus respecting what the journalist calls "the will of the majority".

In the exact opposite direction, a federal popular initiative entitled "for popular initiatives to be put to the vote within six months, and the Federal Council and the Federal Assembly to be barred from voting" (French: pour que les initiatives populaires soient soumises au vote dans les six mois et que le Conseil fédéral et l'Assemblée fédérale soient forclos), nicknamed the "muzzle initiative", (Note: Another federal popular initiative, tabled in 2004 and rejected in the vote on 1 June, 2008, has also been dubbed the "muzzle initiative". This initiative, on the same theme as the previous one, differs only in that the Federal Council is prohibited from issuing an opinion on the proposal put to the vote.) was launched in 1999 with the aim of abolishing all limits on the right of initiative (including the number of signatures and the time limit for collecting them) and obliging the authorities to put it to the vote within six months of its tabling. This proposal was intended to introduce a system equivalent to that used in the State of California, where a popular initiative can be constitutional or legislative, where the authorities have virtually no power or influence over them and where the validity of a given initiative is confirmed after it has been voted on by the courts. However, this initiative failed to gather the necessary signatures to succeed.

For its part, the Federal Council also voiced strong criticism of the federal popular initiative in its 1995 constitutional revision proposal: the obligation placed on the federal authorities to deal with these requests, which escape the traditional filter system ensuring one of the requests in the political system, could be seen as weakening these same authorities. In addition, the multiplication of these requests would contribute to putting the federal system "under stress" by diverting it from its priority tasks. However, the government's proposal to increase the number of signatures required, already mentioned earlier in this article, was not taken up.

Again in 2013, several voices, including those of the think tank Avenir Suisse and former Secretary of state Jean-Daniel Gerber (in an interview with the Neue Zürcher Zeitung), called for a reduction in the number of popular initiatives put to the vote. Gerber proposes three options: increasing the number of signatures to 200,000, shortening the deadline for collecting signatures to 9 months, or establishing a quorum in the Federal Assembly requiring a certain number of "sponsorships" from MPs before a popular initiative can be put to the vote.

At both federal and cantonal level, a number of studies have been carried out to determine whether the use of the Internet by the authorities could increase the participation rate, often below 50%, of citizens in various votes; this use could be in political communication, in electronic voting, or in the collection of electronic signatures. In a 1998 study on the subject, e-government and e-democracy specialist Christine Poupa did not believe "that the overall participation rate would be significantly altered by the possible introduction of new tools", tools which in any case, in her view, would not be acceptable at federal level for many years to come.

In terms of the content of federal popular initiatives, a number of criticisms have also been voiced. This is particularly true of the risk of "emotionalizing politics", as Karl Schumann puts it, noting that the popular initiative enables the people to take a concrete (constitutional) decision, even though public law stipulates that any concrete decision must derive from a law. On the same theme, French philosopher and political scientist Denis Collin denounces the idea of popular initiative referendums because of the excessive risk of demagoguery, and explicitly cites Switzerland as an example. As a solution, Schumann points out that the popular initiative is a tool that the people can use to take a concrete (constitutional) decision, even though public law stipulates that any concrete decision must derive from a law. As a solution, Schumann proposes, for example, to transform the initiative into a simple request to Parliament, which should only deal with it if it is supported by a certain percentage of MPs. These risks of populist excesses or the imposition of an almost "tyrannical" will of a majority on a minority (to use Professor José Woehrling's expression) were highlighted in the study carried out by the Canadian authorities in 2002, following the proposal made by the Minister for the Reform of Democratic Institutions, Jean-Pierre Charbonneau, to introduce this right into the national constitution.

=== Initiative titles ===
In 2020 and 2021, the question of initiative titles was discussed. Liberal-Radical National Councillor Damien Cottier from Neuchâtel proposed that the Federal Chancellery should fix the name of the initiative or give it a chronological number, in view of the "marketing" titles of certain popular initiatives, such as the one officially called "Halt overpopulation – Yes to the sustainable preservation of natural resources".

== Proposal ==
The various stages in the process of a federal popular initiative are strictly described in the law: in short, the text of the initiative, which concerns a more or less broadly defined constitutional object, is submitted by an initiative committee to the Federal Chancellery, which carries out a formal check of it; the same initiative committee then has a certain period in which to collect the necessary signatures and submit them, while generally being entitled to withdraw the initiative. Depending on whether the initiative is drafted or general, it will be handled differently by the federal authorities; however, its validity is always subject to both formal and material conditions. Finally, the initiative is put to the vote, with or without a counter-proposal presented by the federal authorities.

=== Composition of the initiative committee ===
Since the adoption of the Federal Law on Political Rights in 1976, all initiatives must be supported by an initiative committee; previously, only those with a withdrawal clause had to follow this rule. The legislative amendment of 21 June, 1996 specifies that this committee must comprise a minimum of seven and a maximum of 27 persons (the first odd number allowing for one representative per canton) with full civic rights (thus excluding minors and foreigners).

The names and addresses of the committee members must appear on all the initiative's signature lists, so that citizens know exactly who is behind and supports the initiative. These members are responsible for preparing the signature lists, having them filled in and forwarding them to the Federal Chancellery; (Note: These skills are not described in law, but are taken for granted. See Grisel, op.cit, p. 166) they are also formally authorized to appeal to the Federal Court against Chancellery decisions. The members of the initiative committee are the only persons entitled to decide on the withdrawal of the initiative by an absolute majority of committee members. Withdrawal may take place at any point in the process, and may be either definitive or conditional on the adoption of a federal law (which generally takes up some of the initiative's demands).

=== Feasibility check ===
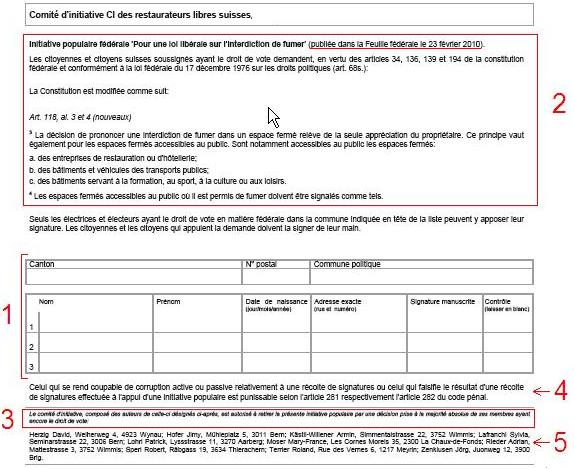
Example of a signature sheet for a federal popular initiative, showing the five mandatory elements listed opposite.

A committee wishing to launch a federal popular initiative must submit the initiative's signature lists to the Federal Chancellery, which, in accordance with article 68 of the Political Rights Act will check that the following details are present:

1. The canton and political commune where the signatory of the initiative has the right to vote, to facilitate the task of checking the validity of the signatures.
2. The title and full text of the initiative, as well as the date of publication in the Federal Gazette, to prevent signatures being collected in advance.
3. The compulsory initiative withdrawal clause, as defined in article 73 of the same law.
4. The exhaustive mention of articles 281 and 282 of the Swiss Penal Code, informing of the offences of electoral fraud or corruption
5. The name and address of the initiative's authors, so that signatories know who is behind the initiative and who is authorized to withdraw it.

In addition to the elements of article 68 listed above, the Chancellery also validates the title of the federal popular initiative, which must not be misleading, contain advertising elements or lead to confusion. In any of these cases, it is the Chancellery's duty to modify the title of the initiative, as provided for in Article 69 of the Political Rights Act; this modification decision may be challenged by the initiative committee before the Federal Supreme Court.

Finally, the Chancellery translates the initiative into the three official languages (Romansh is optional and, unlike the other three language versions, has no legal force), based on one of the versions designated by the initiative committee as the authentic version. Translations carried out by the Federal Chancellery are not subject to appeal. On the other hand, the Federal Chancellery does not carry out any checks on the content of the initiative, nor on its validity. Once the check has been completed, the Federal Chancellery publishes the title and text of the initiative in all three official languages in the Federal Gazette (the Romansh version, if available, is published alongside the German version), together with the names and addresses of the authors, thus enabling the collection of signatures to begin.

This preliminary check by the Chancellery, previously optional, was made compulsory with the entry into force of the Political Rights Act on 1 July, 1978, to prevent a federal popular initiative from being invalidated on the grounds of non-compliance with the signature lists.

=== Collecting, depositing and validating signatures ===
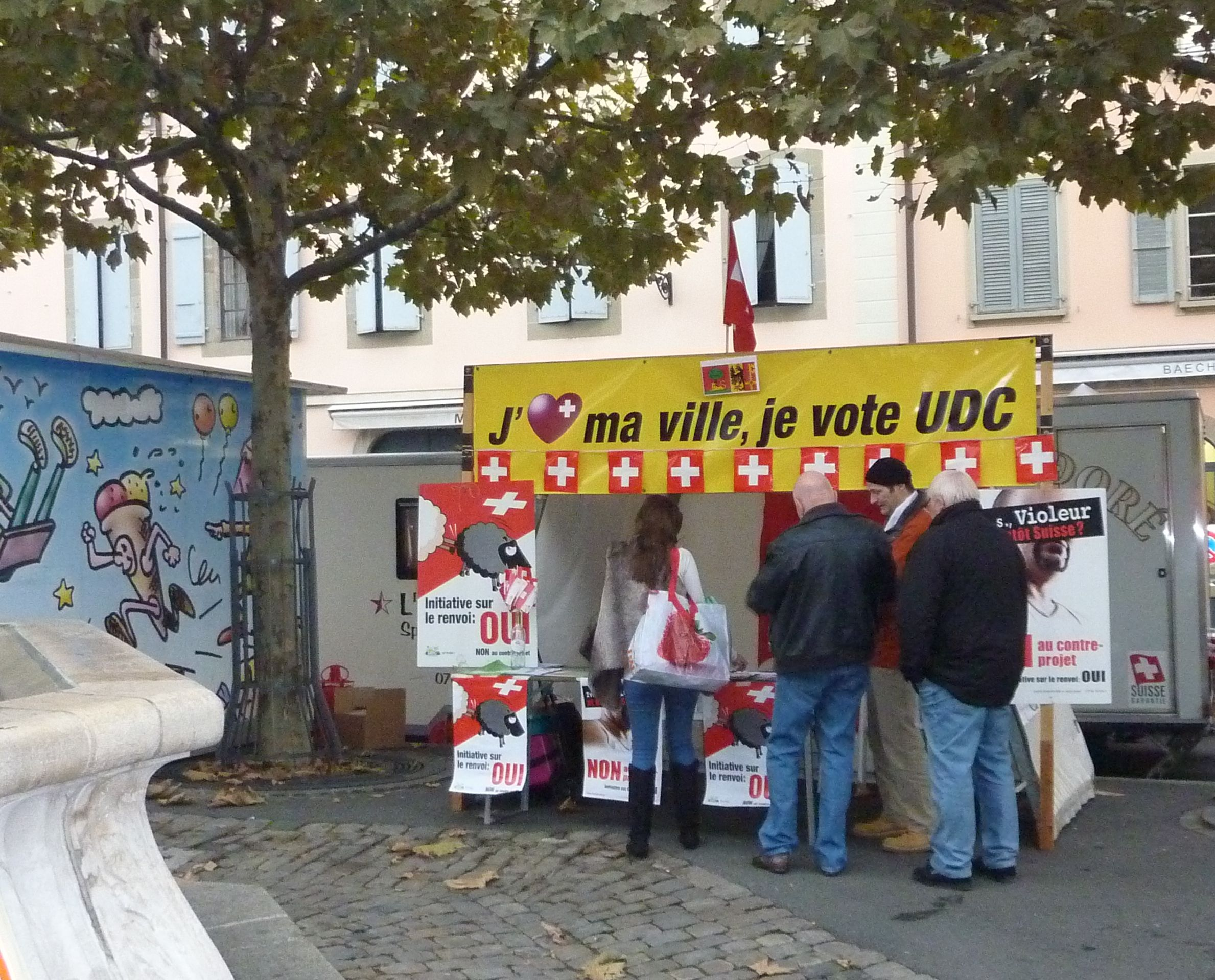
Stand to collect signatures for a federal popular initiative.

Within 18 months of publication in the Federal Gazette, the initiative committee must collect 100,000 signatures on the lists provided for this purpose, which may take many forms. These lists must be submitted to the Federal Chancellery at the same time, failing which the Federal Chancellery simply declares the Federal People's Initiative unsuccessful and publishes this fact in the Federal Gazette; the initiative is then declared null and void and the signatures already collected are lost. (Note: There is no obligation for the initiative committee to submit the signature lists at the end of the 18-month period, even if sufficient support has been gathered.)

In many cases, the collection of signatures represents an important stage for the committee, which not only counts the 100,000 initials required, but also takes advantage of the campaign to inform the public about the reasons for the initiative and what is at stake. This is usually the first opportunity to inform the general public about the federal popular initiative. The means used to collect signatures are left to the choice of the initiative committee, which has extensive rights to ensure the success of the initiative, while respecting public order and the freedom of others. Frequently used means include press advertisements, mailings, door-to-door collections or meetings; since the early 2000s, the practice of paying people to collect signatures seems to have developed. This practice, unlike that of paying people to sign the initiative, is not illegal.

As we have already seen, the number of signatures doubled following popular acceptance of the draft revision on 25 September, 1977. The collection period, on the other hand, was introduced following the creation of the law on political rights, accepted by popular vote on 4 December, 1977 by 59.4% of voters. This limitation, originally intended to reduce the number of initiatives submitted, was also justified by the risks incurred by an initiative left in abeyance for too long and, potentially, no longer fulfilling the wishes of its creators after a certain time. In 2001, a proposal by the Political Institutions Committee of the Council of States aimed to reduce the collection period to 12 months; this proposal, supported by the Federal Council, was however rejected by the plenary of the Council.

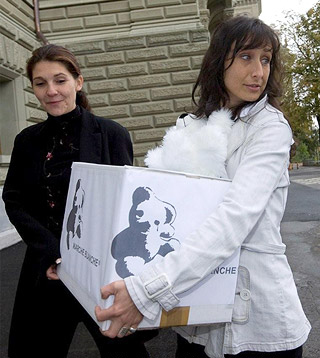
Signatures for the popular initiative "Pour l'imprescriptibilité des actes de pornographie enfantine" deposited by members of the initiative committee.

Once the signature lists have been submitted, the Chancellery counts the number of valid signatures to verify that the federal popular initiative has been successful, i.e. that the necessary signatures have been collected within the allotted time. Signatures may be declared invalid for three different reasons:

- either because they appear on a list that does not meet the criteria of article 68 of the law on political rights
- or because the list was submitted after the 18-month deadline (Note: Although the deadline for submission is 18 months, signatures can be cancelled if they are submitted too late for validation by the communes.)
- or because the person signing the list does not enjoy political rights at federal level.

Verification of the latter reason is the responsibility of each political commune, which is responsible for certifying that the signatory is an active citizen of that commune. This verification is then confirmed by the Chancellery, which cancels all signatures that have not been attested or have been attested falsely, or when the same citizen subscribes more than once to the same federal popular initiative.

In all cases, the Chancellery publishes the number of valid and invalid signatures in the Federal Gazette, together with its decision on the outcome, which may be:

- a declaration of success if more than 100,000 signatures have been validated
- a statement that the deadline has expired and the initiative has failed if less than half the necessary signatures have been validated
- a statement that the initiative has been unsuccessful, in the form of a decision to the contrary.

The first two decisions are not open to challenge. On the other hand, the third decision may be appealed to the Swiss Federal Supreme Court.

As a rule, the Chancellery's review only removes a small number of signatures. The first case in which such a decision would have had this effect concerned the popular initiative "Introduction of the 40-hour week": a first series of signatures had been collected on lists containing only the German text; subsequently, a second series of lists was published with the French and Italian texts as well; the Chancellery then refused to validate the 11,613 signatures of the first series, thus preventing the initiative from succeeding. However, this decision was overturned by the Swiss Federal Supreme Court, which declared the initiative to be valid. In 2012, a second case arose. With regard to the popular initiative "Stop bureaucracy!", the Federal Chancellery noted that "of the 100,649 signatures deposited in time at the Federal Chancellery, at most and assuming that all doubtful cases would be counted as valid, 97,537 are valid".

=== Consultation and opinion of the Federal Council ===
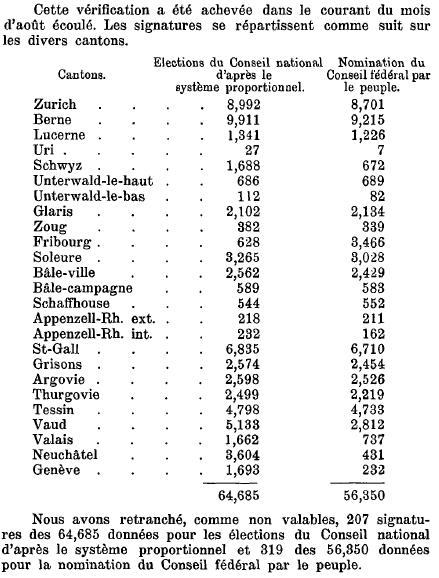
Extract from the 1899 Federal Gazette showing the Federal Chancellery's report on the outcome of two initiatives.

Once a federal popular initiative has been officially approved, it is forwarded to the Federal Council for a decision on its validity and appropriateness. As is generally the case when drafting legislation, the Federal Council organizes a consultation procedure with the cantons, the main representative organizations, political parties and other interested parties. This procedure, which is compulsory for preparatory work on a constitutional amendment, an international treaty subject to referendum, or "projects of major political, financial, economic, ecological, social or cultural significance, or whose execution will be entrusted in large part to bodies outside the federal administration", is not legally required for the government's position on a federal popular initiative, or on whether or not to propose a counter-proposal to it. This method, whether or not coupled with an external study carried out by a commission of experts specifically mandated for this purpose, is nevertheless frequently used by the government, particularly when it has to give an opinion other than a negative one. (Note: See, for example, the popular initiative "pour la participation des travailleurs" (submitted in 1971), where the government ordered a preliminary study on the subject in the absence of available data; the popular initiative "Jeunesse sans drogue" (1991), where the Federal Council judged that it "contained some good proposals", preferring to organize a wide-ranging consultation before issuing its opinion; or the Swiss federal popular initiative for UN membership (2000), where the government organized a consultation before recommending acceptance of the initiative.)

Whatever the procedure followed, the Federal Council must, within one year of the submission of the federal popular initiative to the Federal Chancellery, issue an opinion to the Federal Chambers; this opinion consists of a draft federal decree accompanied by a message in which the government examines both the validity of the initiative and its appropriateness; the government has no formal decision to take, however, and can only issue a recommendation to Parliament.

Such an opinion has existed practically since the inception of the federal popular initiative: the first mention of a position statement by the Federal Council concerns the popular initiative "Election of the National Council based on the population of Swiss nationality" of 1902, for which the Federal Chambers requested the government's opinion before taking a decision, whereas previously the government was content to notify the initiative's outcome. In the early years, the collection of the Federal Council's opinion was included in the one-year period available to the Federal Assembly to deal with the initiative; however, as the years went by, this deadline became increasingly difficult to meet, particularly during the two world wars (Note: During the First World War, only one initiative in six was processed on time. This percentage fell to five out of 12 between 1935 and 1948.) by the government's own admission; a 1948 proposal by the government not to set a precise deadline, but to specify that "the Federal Chambers shall decide without delay, taking into account the circumstances" was rejected by Parliament, which amended the law in 1950 to give the Federal Council two years to submit its report. This two-year period was halved when the Federal Law on Political Rights and the Law on Relations between Councils were amended on 21 June 1996.

In a few cases, mainly dictated by a certain political urgency, the government delivers its opinion very quickly; this was particularly the case for the first of the "Schwarzenbach Initiatives" (named after their principal author) of 1969, for which the Federal Council took no more than four months to deliver its report, or for the 1972 initiative against arms exports, for which the government proposed a counter-proposal in just five months. In both cases, the Federal Council wanted to show its awareness of a problem (the presence of too many foreigners in the first case, and the scandal surrounding the sale of Oerlikon-Buehrle arms to Nigeria in the second), while also avoiding too long a debate on a subject deemed sensitive.

In most cases, however, the Federal Council uses the entire period allotted to it to issue its opinion; while this is sometimes justified by the need to await the finalization of legislation currently being drafted on the subject (as was the case, for example, with the initiatives to reduce working hours or to protect water resources in 1984), this tendency is also used politically to attenuate the effects that led to the submission of the federal popular initiative and, therefore, to minimize its importance to the public, as in the case of the popular initiative "for effective tenant protection", submitted in 1973 during a major housing crisis; the Federal Council waited until 1976, a year in which the economic situation was favorable for tenants, with low inflation and a fall in mortgage rates, before issuing its report, in which it noted "the important role played by the close relationship between rent trends and the economic situation".

=== Processing in Parliament ===
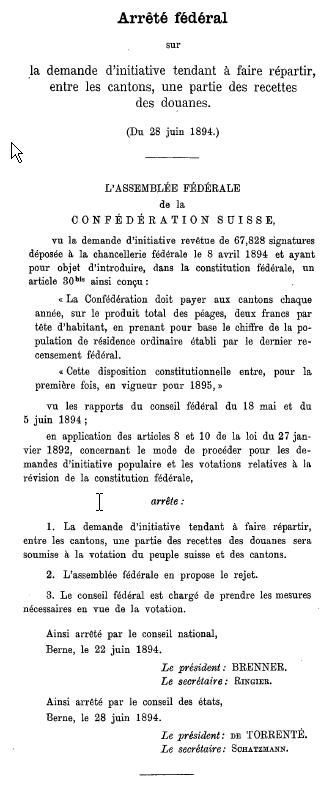
Federal decree and official parliamentary position on the popular initiative "tendant à faire répartir, entre les cantons, une partie des recettes des douanes" in 1894.

N.B. This and the following paragraphs deal with requests for partial revision of the constitution. The process for requests for total revision is completely different, and is therefore dealt with in a separate paragraph.

Based on the opinion of the Federal Council (which may be fully followed, partially followed or totally revised), the two federal chambers first decide on the validity of the federal popular initiative, which can only be overturned on points of law (see next paragraph for details); the rest of the process depends on the form of the federal popular initiative, depending on whether it is conceived in general or drafted terms.

==== Initiative presented in general terms ====
In the case of an initiative presented in general terms, Parliament may decide to reject the initiative, which is then submitted, on the basis of a report by the Federal Council, as presented, to a popular vote (by a simple majority, not required from the cantons) within two years of its decision: in the event of rejection, the procedure is terminated and closed, as has happened four times in history. If the initiative is approved by Parliament, or if it is accepted by the people, the Assembly must draft a constitutional amendment along the lines requested by the text of the Federal People's Initiative Act. This amendment is then put to the vote within thirty months of its drafting, where it must obtain a double majority of the people and the cantons to be accepted.

If the two chambers fail to reach agreement on whether to accept or reject the initiative, or after a period of two years has elapsed since the initiative was submitted, it is automatically deemed to have been rejected, and is therefore put to the vote. These deadlines, which have not always been respected in the past, have been respected since a legislative amendment specifying that Parliament can no longer either approve the initiative or recommend its rejection during the vote. In the case of an approved initiative, if the two chambers are unable to agree on a proposed text, both proposals are put to the vote; however, this has never happened in practice.

There are only two cases in which a constitutional amendment has been put to the vote following a federal popular initiative presented in general terms: the popular initiative "for school coordination" of 1969 and the popular initiative "for the creation of a civil service" of 1972; in both cases, Parliament accepted the initiative. In both cases, however, problems arose during the drafting of the text as to its adequacy with the wishes expressed by the initiative committee: in the first case, the text presented encompassed a broader subject than the simple standardization of the start of school age and the duration of schooling called for by the federal popular initiative, which were not even dealt with in the proposal presented by Parliament. In the second case, differences of opinion arose among the MPs as to whether the final text should be limited to the proposed text, or whether the intentions of the initiators, as presented in public statements, should also be taken into account.

==== Initiative drafted from scratch ====
In the case of an initiative drafted from scratch, Parliament is obliged to submit the text reproduced on the signature lists without the slightest alteration to the double majority of the people and the cantons; however, it has several methods at its disposal for giving its opinion and making it known to the population.

Parliament may first decide to approve the initiative; this decision, which is very rare, has only occurred formally on two occasions, with the initiatives "Pour un jour de la fête nationale férié" (For a national holiday) in 1990 and "Pour l'adhésion à l'ONU" (For UN membership) in 2000; in both cases, the initiatives were subsequently accepted by popular vote.

If Parliament rejects the initiative, it can choose to oppose it with a counter-proposal (direct or indirect) or to formulate a voting recommendation. While the first option is only used in around 15% of cases, the second is the rule; in some rare cases, the Federal Assembly has not issued any voting instructions: the initiative on the solution of deadlines, passed in 1977, for which the two chambers "were unable to agree on a recommendation to be addressed to the people and the cantons", the initiative "against imports of fodder products", withdrawn in 1983 due to an indirect counter-proposal, which Parliament asked the Federal Council to put to the vote "without recommendation", the federal popular initiative against abusive remuneration, for which no concordant decision between the Federal Chambers concerning the voting recommendation has been found, are examples of this.

Since 1 July, 1978, the Parliament Act has set a maximum period of thirty months for Parliament to deal with a drafted federal popular initiative, with the option of extending this period by a maximum of one year if either of the two chambers decides to oppose it with a counter-proposal. These thirty months include the period set aside for the Federal Council to express an opinion on the initiative's validity and appropriateness. Finally, the Federal Council is obliged to organize the popular vote within ten months of the initiative being processed by Parliament. This limitation was put in place to avoid cases, common at certain times, where more than five years elapsed between the submission of a federal popular initiative and the holding of the vote. For example, the popular initiative "against the limitation of the right to vote when concluding treaties with foreign countries" was submitted to the Federal Chancellery on 20 March, 1973; the Federal Council issued its report a year and a half later, on 23 October, 1974; in the first instance, the Council of States decided to declare the initiative null and void; this decision was rejected by the National Council, which instead proposed a counter-proposal on the text of which the two chambers would battle. In all, it took more than two years, until 17 December, 1976, for the parliamentary decree to be finally published, and a few months more to organize the vote, which finally took place on 13 March, 1977.

=== Counter-project ===
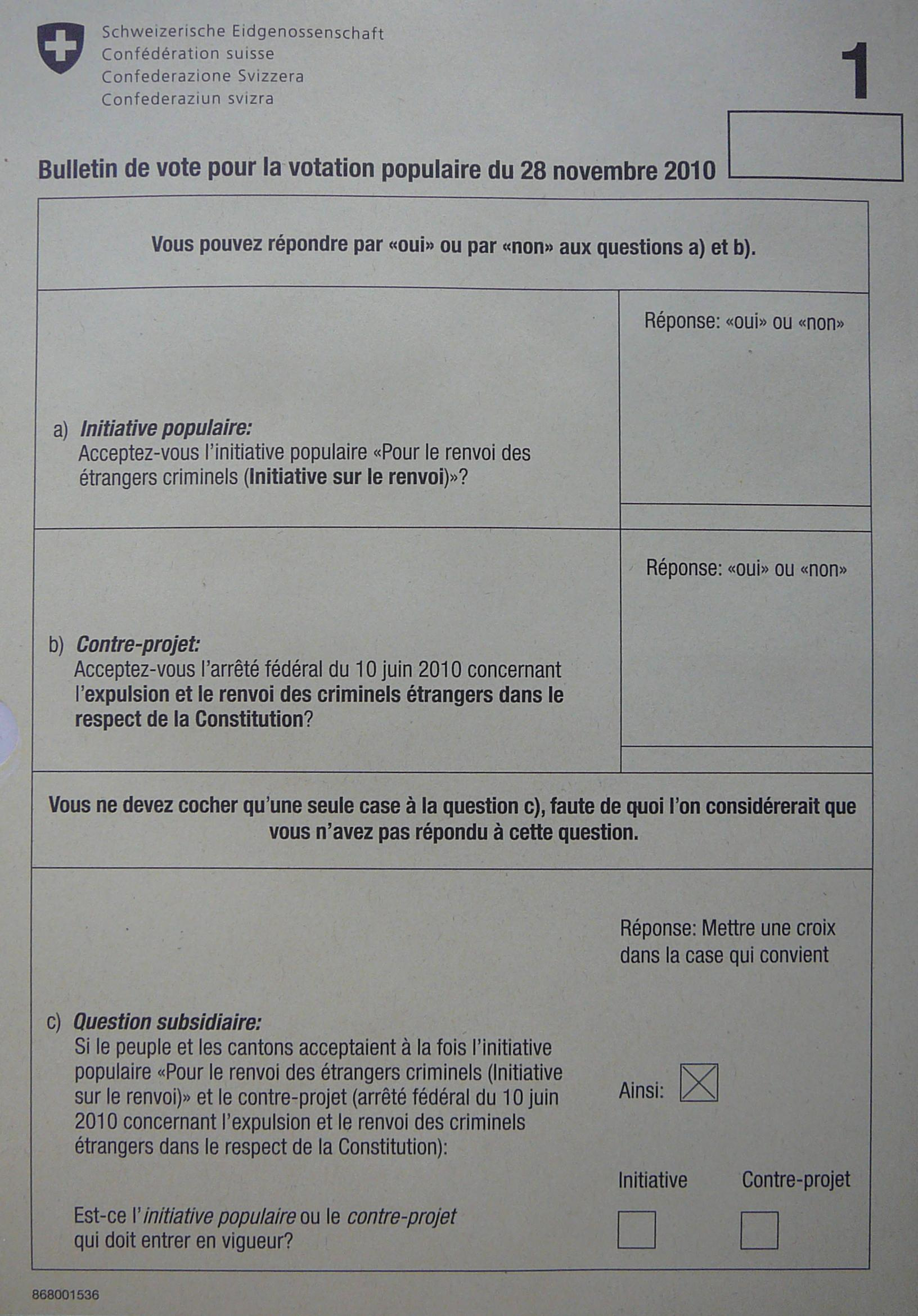
28 November 2010 ballot for a federal initiative with direct counter-proposal. Subsidiary question at the bottom of the ballot.

As mentioned above, Parliament is authorized to submit a counter-proposal to a federal popular initiative.

This possibility was created in 1891 for a dual purpose: firstly, to offer an opportunity to correct a poorly drafted text by an inexperienced committee, but also to offer Parliament the possibility of conveying a more nuanced option than a simple rejection of the initiative, particularly in cases where it accepts (even partially) the principle while rejecting the form. Over time, two additional uses for the counter-proposal have emerged: that of favouring the status quo by "diluting" voters' votes between the federal popular initiative and the counter-proposal, and that of expressing the initiators' ideas in a more balanced way, thereby increasing the chances of success in the event of a vote. However, since 2003, when the possibility of voting for both the initiative and the counter-proposal – also known as the "double yes" system was accepted by popular vote, it has no longer been possible to "dilute" the votes of those opposed to the status quo between the popular initiative and the counter-proposal. The desire to take up certain demands of the initiative in a more balanced way is illustrated, for example, by the counter-proposal proposed by the Federal Council to the popular initiative "Utilisation des forces hydrauliques", tabled in 1906 and which "really gives too few indications for the subsequent implementing legislation": while the principle expressed in the initiative is approved, its wording "appeared to us to be unacceptable", according to the Federal Council's report, which presents a new formulation along the same lines.

Of the 16 cases of this type recorded between 1891 and 2018, there were 6 counter-projects adopted against 3 accepted initial initiatives, and 7 rejections of both proposals.

There are in fact two forms of counter-proposal: the direct counter-proposal, or properly so-called, and the indirect counter-proposal, or improperly so-called.

==== Direct counter-proposal ====
A direct counter-proposal is a proposal for constitutional amendment submitted by the Federal Assembly that meets two criteria: a formal criterion, in that the proposal must be voted on simultaneously, and a substantive criterion, in that the two texts must relate to "the same constitutional matter". In concrete terms, the two texts must address the same issue, but may provide different answers or cover a different field.

In fact, between 1891 and 1992, 26 of the 184 successful initiatives were opposed by a counter-proposal; in half of these cases, the initiators withdrew their initiative in favor of the counter-proposal, while the remaining 13 cases were put to the vote: in six cases, the counter-proposal was accepted and not the initiative, and in five cases neither the counter-proposal nor the initiative was accepted. In the last two cases, the initiative was accepted but not the counter-proposal.

==== Indirect counter-proposal ====
Under Article 97 of the Parliament Act (8), the Federal Assembly may submit as a counter-proposal a "closely related draft act" to a federal popular initiative, without however submitting it to a simultaneous vote; this act is then called an "indirect counter-proposal". One of the advantages of the indirect counter-proposal lies in the fact that it can take the form of a simple law rather than a constitutional amendment, thus avoiding overloading the Constitution with too many details.

Although the indirect counter-proposal is not put to the vote at the same time as the federal popular initiative it opposes, the link between the two proposals can be accentuated, in particular by making the entry into force of the counter-proposal conditional on the rejection or withdrawal of the initiative. The legislation proposed as an indirect counter-proposal can, of course, be challenged by a referendum; should the latter be successful, the Federal Council may submit the initiative and counter-proposal simultaneously to the vote, but is not obliged to do so: this distinction represents the main difference between a direct and an indirect counter-proposal.

Between 1945 and 1997, for example, 19 federal popular initiatives were withdrawn by their authors following the presentation of an indirect counter-proposal by Parliament. In the majority of cases, the counter-projects only partially met the demands of the initiatives; however, for the period cited there are four examples where the initiative was withdrawn as fully realized by an act of law: the initiative "for a return to direct democracy" withdrawn on 24 January 1951, two initiatives in favor of disability insurance, withdrawn on 5 December and 8, 1959, and finally the initiative "against the supersonic boom of civil aircraft", withdrawn on 15 May, 1972.

=== Votation ===
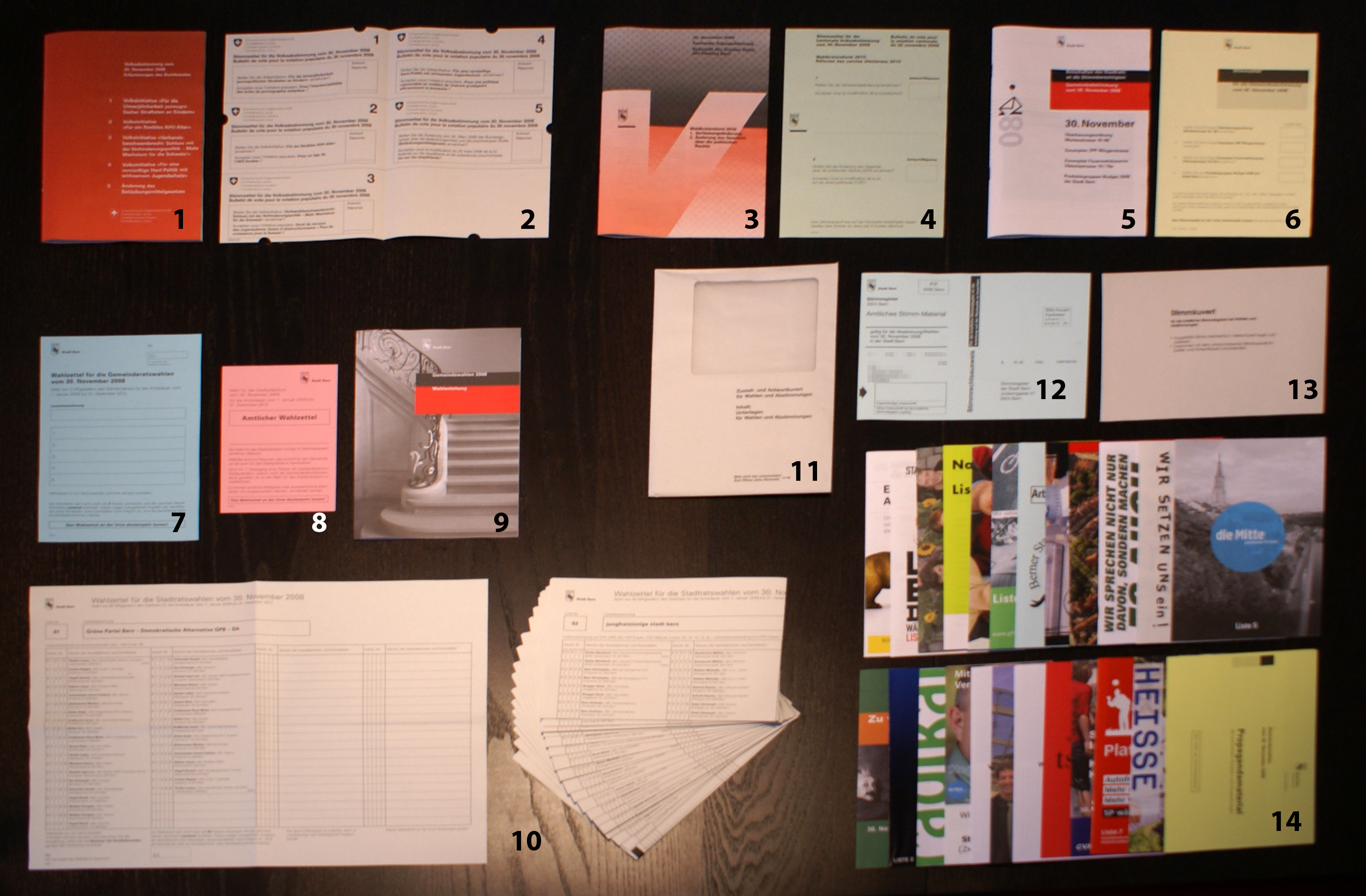
Voting material sent to citizens (November 2008).

Once the Federal Assembly has completed its work on a federal popular initiative, the Federal Council has ten months in which to submit it (and any direct counter-proposal) to a popular vote. It uses one of the dates set by the Federal Chancellery to do this, and must then inform the electorate about the initiative, while respecting "the principles of completeness, objectivity, transparency and proportionality" and only advocating the voting recommendations of the Federal Assembly.

The text put to the vote is the one appearing strictly on the signature sheets, and the vote is on this proposal, not on the parliamentary resolution. In addition to this text, each citizen receives at home, "at the earliest four weeks before the day of the vote, but at the latest three weeks before this date", the voting material, the text submitted to the vote, as well as objective explanations from the Federal Council, enabling voters to familiarize themselves with the subject; these explanations must include the arguments put forward by the initiative committee and those of the Federal Assembly, as well as the latter's voting instructions.

A federal popular initiative is approved if it obtains a majority of voters in the case of a proposal in general terms, and if it obtains a double majority of cantons and voters in the case of a draft proposal. If Parliament opposes a counter-proposal to a federal popular initiative, the process is slightly different: the two proposals are presented simultaneously, and voters are asked to answer three questions: whether they prefer the initiative to the current situation, whether they prefer the counter-proposal to the current situation, and finally, in the event of double approval, whether they prefer the initiative or the counter-proposal. The third question is used only if both texts are approved, and defines which of the two proposals will be applied; in the very specific case where both proposals are accepted, and the majority of the people vote for one of the texts and the majority of the cantons for the other in the third question, the law stipulates that the text that comes into force is the one "that has recorded the highest sum of the percentages of the votes of the voters and the votes of the cantons".

This procedure came into force in 1988, a year after it had been approved in a popular vote on 5 April, 1987 by 63.3% of voters. It replaces the previous procedure, introduced in 1892, under which only two mutually exclusive questions were put ("Do you accept the initiative" or "Do you accept the referendum"); voters were then given the choice of rejecting both proposals or accepting just one, with a double-yes vote counted as a no vote, and a blank vote as a no vote. This procedure was widely criticized, in particular for favoring the status quo too much, or preventing voters from expressing a sufficiently nuanced vote in the event that their first choice was not followed.

=== Withdrawal and cancellation ===
From the moment a federal popular initiative is deposited with the Federal Chancellery until ten days before the Federal Council sets the voting date, a majority of the members of the initiative committee may request, in writing, that the initiative be withdrawn; this decision is then published in the Federal Gazette and the case is closed.

This possibility of withdrawal has been compulsory since the 1976 Political Rights Act; previously, this provision was optional. Historically, five initiatives have been explicitly excluded from the right of withdrawal: these were the initiatives "for a ban on atomic weapons" in 1959, "on the fight against alcoholism" in 1963, "against foreign domination" in 1969, "against foreign domination and overpopulation of Switzerland" in 1972, and "against limiting voting rights when concluding treaties with foreign countries" in 1973; this rejection of the possibility of withdrawal can be explained either by the assertion of a desire to see the procedure through to the end (as in the case of the first initiative on foreign domination), or (in the case of the initiative against atomic weapons, for example) because a compromise is not conceivable in the minds of the initiators.

Apart from these few specific cases, the withdrawal clause is widely used: almost a third of successful federal popular initiatives are withdrawn by their initiators. There are many reasons for such withdrawals: the initiative may have lost its purpose (following a legal amendment or a change in circumstances), or a proposed counter-proposal may seem more appropriate to the initiators, who agree to withdraw their text in favor of the counter-proposal.

There is another way of halting the process of a federal popular initiative: Parliament may, when considering the proposal, declare it invalid and cancel it. The grounds for annulment are as follows:

- failure to respect the unity of form (the federal popular initiative can only be conceived in general terms or drafted)
- failure to respect the unity of subject matter (an "intrinsic relationship" must exist between the different parts of an initiative)
- serious infringement of a peremptory norm of international law (the initiative is contrary to international jus cogens)
- initiative deemed unrealistic (this rule was deemed "so obvious" by the Federal Council that it was not strictly written into law).

Political scientist Étienne Grisel defines a fifth ground for annulment, namely failure to respect the unity of rank (the text must only concern a constitutional amendment); however, according to jurist Jean-François Aubert, practice does not seem to have retained this ground in practice.

It is the criterion of unity of subject matter that is the trickiest to manage and lends itself to the most discussion. According to Jean-François Aubert's definition, a federal popular initiative violates this criterion when "it contains at least two points, and a citizen can want one without wanting the other, and want the other without wanting the first"; the same author estimates the number of initiatives falling under this definition at around fifteen. Parliament has a different interpretation of this criterion, going so far as to split a federal popular initiative proposing both a change in the naturalization procedure and in that dealing with the expulsion of foreigners "jeopardizing the security of the country", and to organize two votes, each on half of the text. Historically, the Federal Assembly has always been fairly broad in its interpretation of the "unity of subject matter".

From the inception of the federal popular initiative to the beginning of the 21st century, four proposals have been annulled by Parliament:

1. The popular initiative "for the temporary reduction of military expenditure", declared null and void in 1955 as "objectively unenforceable" according to the Federal Council's message
2. The popular initiative "against high living costs and inflation", declared null and void in 1977 because it did not respect the principle of unity of subject matter
3. The popular initiative "for less military spending and more peace policy", declared null and void for the same reason in 1995
4. The popular initiative "pour une politique d'asile raisonnable" (for a reasonable asylum policy), declared null and void for failing to respect human rights in 1996

=== Special case of the initiative for a total revision of the constitution ===
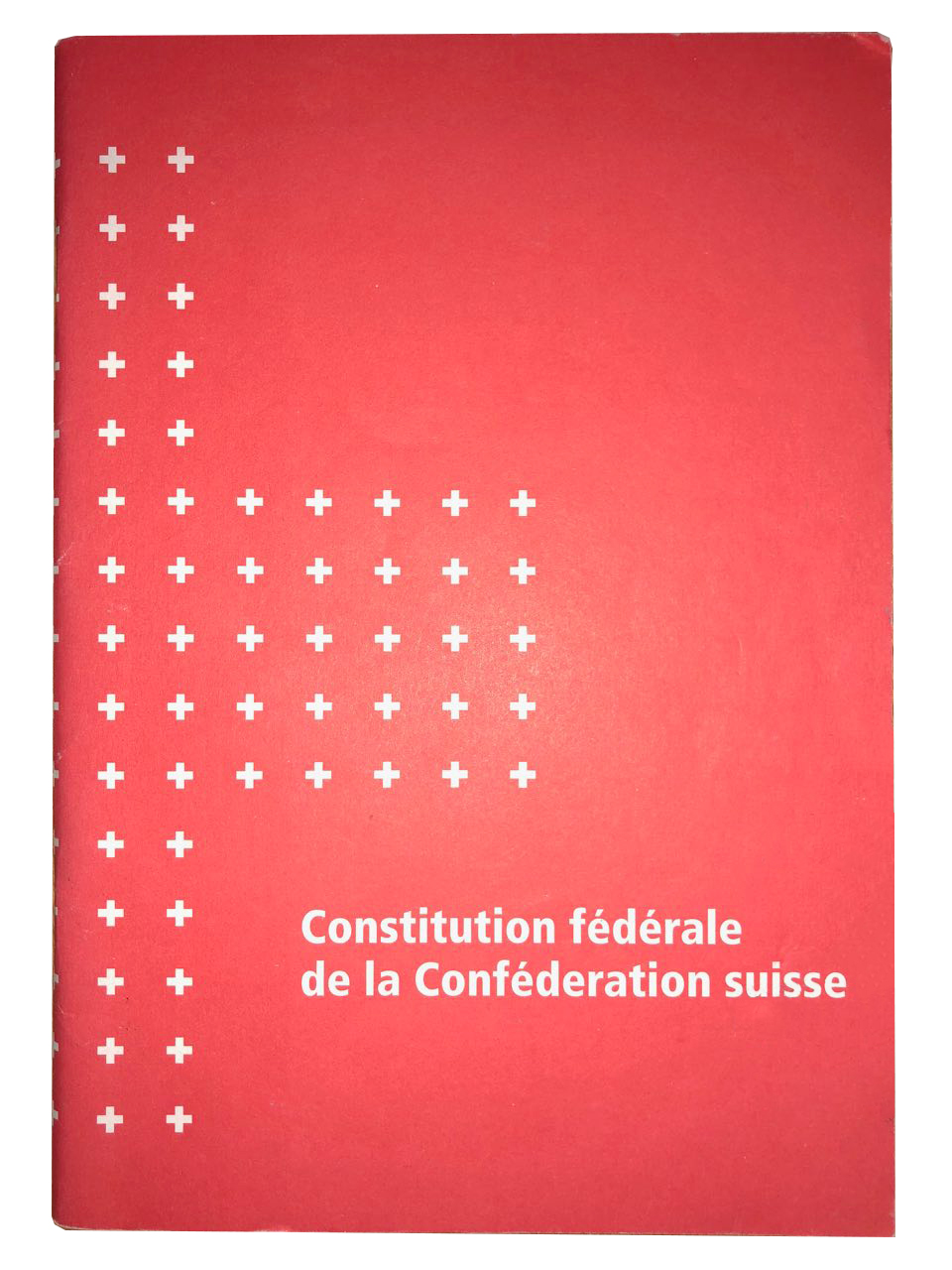
Requests for total revision of the constitution are very rare.

Although also grouped under the name of federal popular initiative, the request for a complete revision of the constitution is totally distinct from the first two cases dealt with in the preceding paragraphs. This request, which can be made at any time, expresses the popular will to modify the national fundamental law as a whole, without however implying a modification of all the articles of which it is composed.

The commonly accepted view is that, while the promoters of this type of initiative are of course entitled to explain the reasons for their request, the text of the initiative calling for a complete revision must be as simple as possible (Note: The text of the so-called "Spring Initiative" of 1999, for example, read as follows: "We demand the complete revision of the Federal Constitution by the new Parliament, in accordance with Art. 193, paras. 2 and 3 of the Constitution".) and may under no circumstances contain a written project as to the content of the future constitution or the desired modifications. However, this is disputed by some political scientists, who argue that this limitation is not specified in article 139 of the 2003 constitution and that, therefore, a drafted initiative that would have an impact on a significant part of the constitution should be treated as a request for total revision.

When such a request is formally granted, the Federal Council is obliged to organize, in the short term, a first vote which only deals with the question of principle calling for a complete revision. Since the 2001 revision of the Parliament Act, and following a proposal by the National Council's Political Institutions Committee, the Federal Assembly has been authorized to take a position on the substance of this request, which must be approved by a simple majority of the people to be validated. If the initiative is rejected, it is shelved; this was the case for the federal popular initiative launched in 1934 by various far-right parties, which was rejected by 72.3% of the votes cast.

In the -as yet theoretical- event of this initiative being accepted in a referendum, the Federal Chambers are automatically dissolved and general elections are held, following which the Federal Council is re-elected. The newly-elected deputies must then work on a new version of the constitution, which must still be approved in a popular vote by a double majority of the people and the cantons; in the event of rejection, the old constitution is retained, while in the event of acceptance, it is replaced by the new version.

== Examples ==
=== Before the First World War ===
Between the implementation of the 1891 reform and the outbreak of the First World War, a dozen federal popular initiatives were tabled, of which only four (half of which were voted on after the end of the war) were accepted. The first of these called for a ban on the traditional slaughter of cattle for slaughter as practised by Jews, despite the negative opinion of Parliament, which felt that this proposal placed a limit on Jews' freedom of conscience and worship. Then it was the turn of the Swiss Socialist Party to launch its first two federal popular initiatives, calling respectively for the "right to work" and "free medical care for the sick"; the former was rejected by over 80% of voters, while the latter failed to obtain even the necessary number of signatures; these initial failures would, for some years, chill the opposition parties, who saw this popular right as a "war machine against the party in power".

However, these same opposition parties, the Socialists and the Catholic Conservatives, joined forces in 1899 to launch a new federal popular initiative calling for the introduction of proportional representation in the Federal Chambers, in place of the majority system that favored the ruling Radical Party; this demand followed a similar movement observed in several towns and cantons during the decade 1890–1899, and was coupled with another initiative proposing the direct election of Federal Councillors and an increase in their number to nine. While both proposals were largely rejected in the vote of 4 November 1900, the idea of reforming the voting system was taken up again ten years later and again rejected in the vote, but only by 52.5% of voters; (Note: Unprecedented in history, the initiative was accepted by a majority of the cantons. However, since a double majority was required, the initiative was rejected due to popular rejection.) a third attempt was finally accepted in the vote of 23 October 1918 in the particular context of preparations for the general strike that was called a month later.

=== Between the wars ===
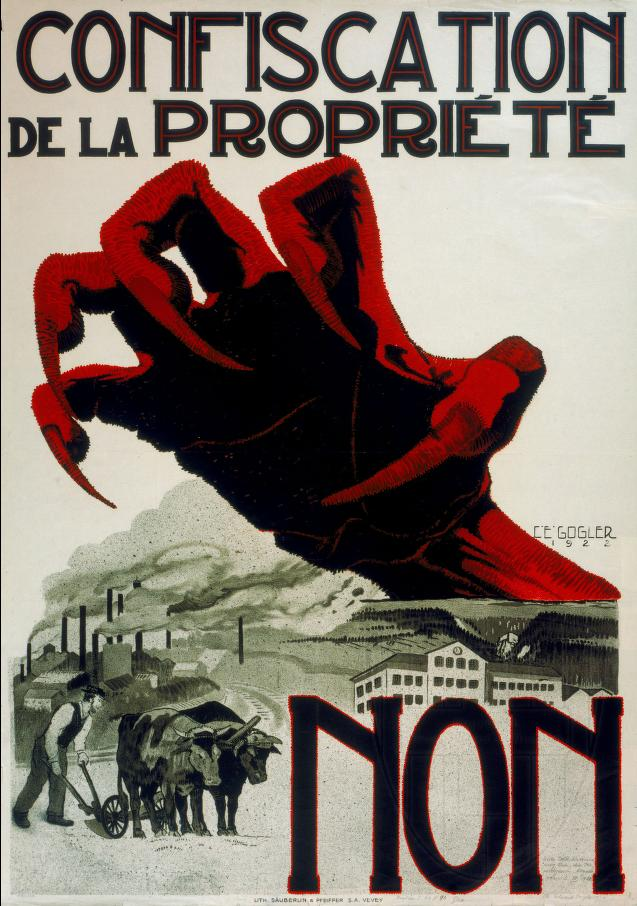
Poster calling for rejection of the federal popular initiative on a single tax.

After the end of the First World War and the general strike of 1918, fronts hardened between the left, representing the working class, and the bourgeoise right. This class struggle was also reflected in the federal popular initiatives put forward by the two camps in the interwar period: the Socialist Party's proposal to levy a single wealth tax to pay off war debts (rejected on 3 December 1922 by 87% of voters) was countered by a proposal to authorize the arrest of Swiss citizens who endangered the country's internal security, enabling the authorities to imprison citizens taking part in mass demonstrations (also rejected on 18 February, 1923 by 89% of voters). Throughout this period, the Socialist Party, ousted from power and faced with the bourgeois majority's refusal to grant it a seat on the Federal Council, stepped up the number of referendums and initiatives, which were then considered their main means of action in the political struggle at federal level. Among these demands, the "Rothenberger initiative", named after its principal author, called for the creation of an old-age insurance scheme; this proposal was rejected in a vote on 24 May, 1925 by 58% of voters, thus delaying the creation of the AVS until the end of the Second World War.

The 1930s saw the creation of several frontist and fascist groups in Switzerland, who launched two federal popular initiatives: the first, tabled by a group of conservative circles and fronts, called for a total revision of the Constitution; it was rejected by 72.3% of the vote on 8 September, 1935. The second, rejected on 28 November, 1937 by 68% of voters, called for a ban on Freemasonic lodges, as in Mussolini's Italy. Both initiatives were largely defeated, thanks in particular to the involvement of socialists and trade unionists in the campaign, alongside traditional right-wing parties; This attitude was all the more noteworthy given that these same right-wing parties had allied themselves with extreme right-wing groups to counter another initiative "to combat the economic crisis and its effects" tabled by the left and rejected, with a turnout of over 80% of voters, by just 57.2% of voters on 2 June 1935 at the end of an extremely tough campaign, during which the Federal Council denounced the initiators' desire to create, within Europe, a "small futuristic state of the socialist type". Although rejected, the initiative had several effects, not least the government's decision to devalue the Swiss franc by 30% to combat the economic crisis.

=== From the Second World War to 1970 ===
As part of its new "New Switzerland" program, adopted in 1942, the Socialist Party launched a number of federal popular initiatives at the end of the war, calling for the right to work, economic reform, guaranteed purchasing power and full employment. However, it was challenged by the Alliance of Independents, which also tabled a number of initiatives calling for the guarantee of full employment, a reorganization of the National Council to combat absenteeism in Parliament and the introduction of a 44-hour working week. The only initiative to be put to the vote during this period was the one officially entitled "Return to Direct Democracy", approved on 28 October 1949 against the advice of the Federal Council and Parliament, abolishing the "emergency clause" widely used by the federal government in the 1930s and 1940s to avoid the risk of a referendum; this initiative would be the last to be approved for the next thirty years.

During this period, in addition to initiatives linked to traditional left-wing ideas, two new themes emerged: the fight against nuclear power (military or civil) and environmental protection. The first theme would be tackled by two initiatives: one prohibiting the Swiss army from equipping itself with nuclear weapons, while the other, more nuanced, wanted to make the decision to equip the army with atomic weapons subject to a mandatory referendum; both proposals followed the report by a "study commission for atomic questions" commissioned by the Federal Council and recommending an atomic defense for the country. The second was to be defended with, in particular, an initiative demanding a popular vote for any concession granted for the use of hydraulic power, preceded by a request to prevent the construction of a run-of-river power plant in the Rheinau region. This federal popular initiative was the first whose validity was called into question by the Federal Council, which feared that its application would entail a breach of Switzerland's commitments to Germany; the decision ultimately taken was to declare the initiative valid and recommend its rejection, in particular on the grounds that it would entail a breach of Switzerland's international commitments.

=== From 1970 to the end of the 20th century ===
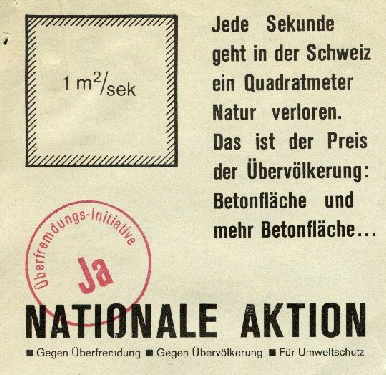
Poster calling for a vote in favor of the first initiative against foreign overpopulation.

The early 1970s marked the beginning of a series of initiatives against foreign overpopulation, and particularly the second, the so-called "Schwarzenbach Initiative", named after its main promoter James Schwarzenbach. These initiatives, associated with the anti-immigration movement ("anti-Überfremdung"), sought to impose limitations on the number of foreign residents within each canton. Despite repeated attempts, none of the six initiatives on this topic were ultimately successful in public votes. Notably, the first such initiative, held on 7 June 1970, received a relatively high level of public participation (almost 75% voter turnout) though it was ultimately rejected by 54% of voters.

From the mid-1970s onwards, several federal popular initiatives were launched, in particular by environmentalist Franz Weber, with the aim of reducing vehicle traffic. It included "against air pollution caused by motor vehicles" in 1974, "for twelve Sundays a year without motor vehicles or aircraft" the following year, and "for tolls for Alpine road tunnels" in 1982 (the latter initiative failed for lack of signatures); in the mid-1980s, the national road network became the target of environmental groups, who almost simultaneously launched five federal popular initiatives, successively to ban the construction of freeways in the canton of Jura (unsuccessful), between Murten and Yverdon, in the Knorau district, between Biel and Solothurn, and finally, more generally, for a moratorium on any further extension of the road network. None of these proposals was approved by popular vote, however, and it was not until ten years later, on 20 February, 1994, that the Alps Initiative, calling for a transfer from road to rail for crossing the Alps, was accepted by 51.9% of voters.

The 1970s witnessed a rise in a specific type of federal popular initiative. Journalist Fabio Pontiggia of Ticino refers to these as "photocopy initiatives." These initiatives, launched by minority groups or parties, were characterized by their thematic similarity to previously rejected proposals. This repetition, exemplified by initiatives against foreign overpopulation (launched six times), shorter working hours (four times), and nuclear energy (four times), coincided with a broader trend of increasing voter abstentionism observed throughout 20th-century Swiss politics.

=== 21st century ===
From 2001 to 2018, 66 initiatives were put to the vote, or 3.88 per year, compared with an average of 1.69 per year since 1893. The success rate was also higher from 2001 to 2018, reaching 15.15% compared with just over 10% since 1893. According to political scientist Antoine Chollet, the federal popular initiative "is essentially a way out of the parliamentary arena for parties that are represented there but in the minority".

Much of the inflation in the adoption of initiatives can be explained by the strategy of the Swiss People's Party. Even though the first federal popular initiative of the 21st century to be accepted in a referendum called for Switzerland to join the UN, the end of the 20th century and the beginning of the following century were marked by federal popular initiatives launched by the SVP: "against abuses in the right of asylum" or "for democratic naturalization", which tended to revive, particularly through polemical poster campaigns, the fear of foreigners and the promotion of Alleingang ("lonely way" in German). The judicious use of these initiatives, particularly before and during national elections, enabled the party to win a significant number of votes, becoming the leading Swiss party in terms of the number of voters in 1999, ahead of the Socialist Party and the center-right parties.

In 2019, the Federal Supreme Court annulled the vote on the initiative against the tax penalization of marriage, a first at federal level. (Note: The same thing has happened several times in cantonal and communal elections.) The Federal Council and the Chancellery were mistaken about the number of couples affected by the initiative, and the inaccuracy of the information coupled with the very close result (50.8% no vote) prompted the Federal Court to declare the outcome of the ballot to be in breach of the fundamental right to vote.

== Statistics and themes ==
=== Different themes ===
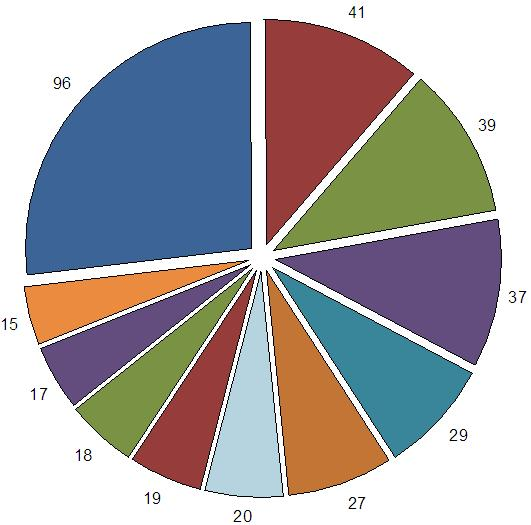
Themes covered by federal popular initiatives between 1890 and 2010: Transport (41), People's rights (39), Taxes (37), Insurance (except AHV)(29), Military (27), Foreigners (20), Society in general (19), AHV (18), Ecology (17), Labour (15), Other (96)

Theoretically, and provided the rules set out in Article 139 of the Constitution are respected, there is no limit to the themes addressed by federal popular initiatives. This thesis, consistently upheld by the federal authorities, is opposed by several political scientists who believe that the fundamental principles of Swiss politics (such as federalism, human rights, or democratic institutions) cannot be touched. However, as the Federal Constitution in no way restricts the right of federal popular initiative, initiators can propose the deletion of any constitutional section or the addition of any provision "however insignificant or far-fetched it may seem".

Certain themes, however, recur throughout the 20th century. The list below shows the ten themes that were the subject of the greatest number of federal popular initiatives between 1890 and 2010. (Note: As a federal popular initiative may concern several topics (e.g. transport and nature conservation, or taxes and social insurance), the totals do not correspond exactly to the total number of initiatives submitted.) In brackets, after the number of initiatives on the theme, is the number of successful initiatives on the same theme::=

- With 41 initiatives (of which only 14 were put to the vote), transport is the most frequently mentioned theme; by transport, we mean both public transport (particularly rail) and private transport (particularly road), as well as traffic restrictions or bans.
- The second most popular theme is popular rights, with 39 initiatives (and 21 votes): the composition and powers of federal authorities, women's representation and gender equality are the most popular subjects under this heading.
- Next on the list, with 37 proposals and 15 votes, is taxation, which includes not only the various forms of direct and indirect taxation, but also customs duties and the use of taxes.
- With 29 initiatives (and 9 votes), we then find the theme of social insurance, with the exception of old-age and survivors' insurance (AVS), which is dealt with separately: this category includes health insurance, disability insurance (AI), unemployment insurance (AC), as well as all other social assistance.
- Military issues and the Swiss army follow, with 27 initiatives (20 of which have been put to the vote). This category covers the rights and duties of the army, as well as issues relating to its budget and equipment.
- The topic of foreigners and their place in the country follows with 20 initiatives (of which 13 were put to the vote). In addition to various proposals aimed at limiting the foreign population, this theme also includes support for foreigners and the problems of integrating them.
- Next, in descending order, we find initiatives concerning social problems in general, with 19 proposals (13 votes), various requests and modifications to old-age and survivors' insurance (AVS) with 18 initiatives (11 votes), problems linked to the environment and nature conservation with 17 initiatives (6 votes) and finally problems and requests linked to the world of work with 15 initiatives (9 votes). The other, less significant themes (including foreign policy, education, energy and housing) accounted for the remaining 96 initiatives.

=== Different promoters of federal popular initiatives ===
It is possible to identify five main groups of promoters of federal popular initiatives:

- National political parties: by far the most important promoter of federal popular initiatives remains the Swiss Socialist Party, with 24 proposals put to the vote and at least as many others that failed to obtain the necessary number of signatures or were withdrawn; this activity can be seen both before the Socialists joined the Federal Council and since their participation in it from 1943. In addition to class struggle and the extension of people's rights, the party supported a wide range of issues, including ecology, culture, social insurance, armaments and energy. At the other end of the Swiss federal political spectrum, the Union démocratique du center (UDC) has also made use of the federal popular initiative, but only since the 1990s; of the four initiatives launched by this party, three concern foreigners and the right of asylum, while the last one concerns the allocation of the Swiss National Bank's surplus gold reserves to old-age and survivors' insurance (AHV). Around the same time, Les Verts also launched two popular initiatives; however, before the formation of a national ecologist party, several local movements had already launched various federal popular initiatives on nature conservation themes, but without much success in popular votes. Finally, the two center-right parties, the Radical-Democratic Party (now the Liberal-Radical Party) and the Christian-Democratic Party, have very rarely resorted to the federal popular initiative; Jean-Daniel Delley offers a simple explanation for this observation: the two parties combined, when they wish to pass a political project, are sufficiently represented in both houses of Parliament to be able to find a majority in favor of this project and thus avoid having to go through a federal popular initiative to get it implementedre.
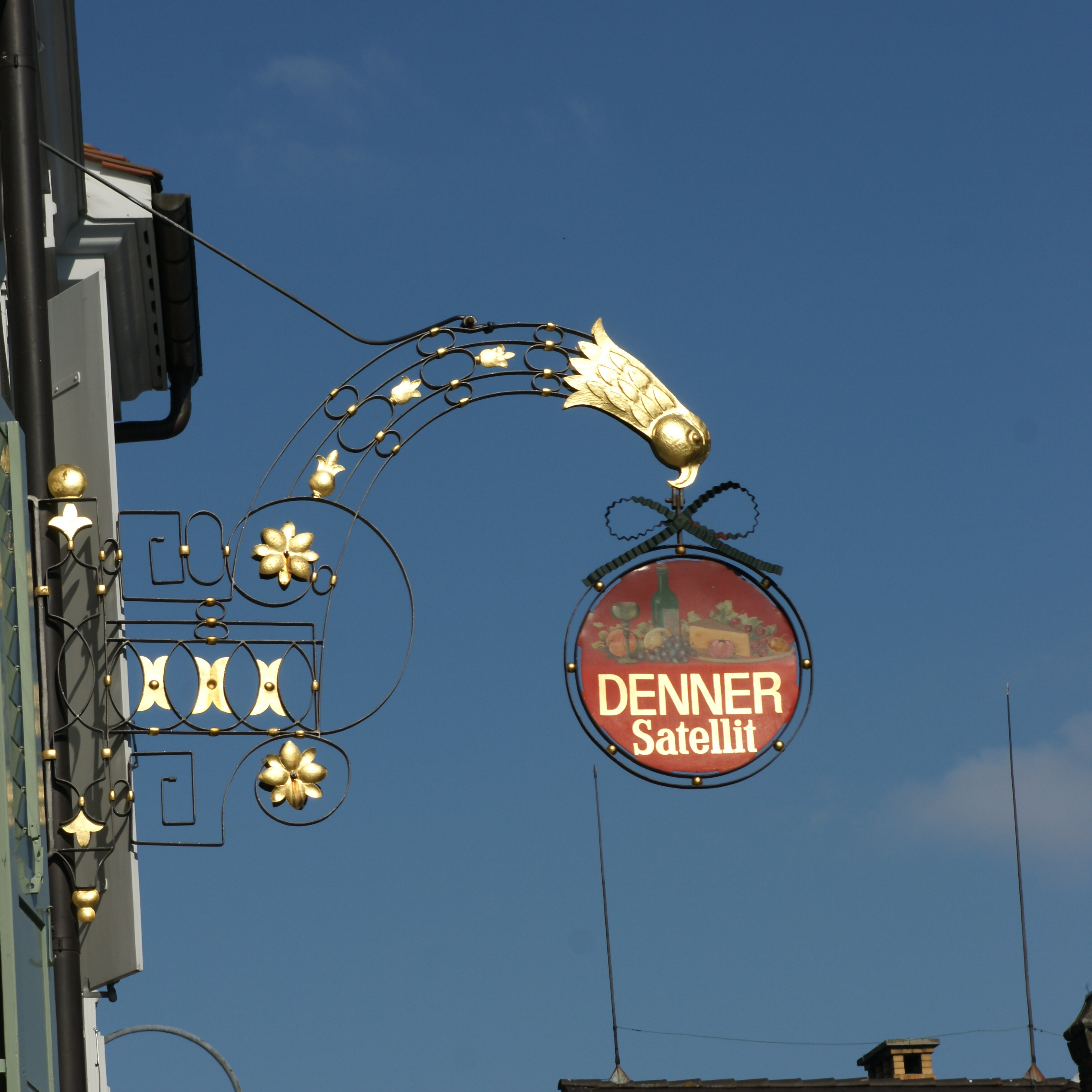
  In addition to the various political groups, other organizations such as Denner have also launched federal popular initiatives.
- Smaller political parties: in addition to the major national parties, smaller groups (either because of their size or their geographically limited presence) also make use of federal popular initiatives; their aim can be either ideological or political, whether to take advantage of the national visibility offered by this possibility or to unsettle the major parties by imposing a subject for debate. These groups include Action nationale (later renamed Swiss Democrats), Alliance des indépendants, Lega tessinoise, Ligue vaudoise, Mouvement populaire des familles, Mouvement républicain suisse, Swiss Freedom Party, Swiss Labor Party, Progressive Organizations of Switzerland and Union démocratique fédérale.
- Professional and trade union organizations: these organizations, which over time have come to occupy an important place in Swiss politics, are defined as groups of participants in economic life, either by sector of activity or by hierarchical function. While employers' organizations do not launch federal popular initiatives in their name, they are often involved in the initiative committeeve; conversely, the Swiss Trade Union Federation has been one of the most important players, either alone (13) or in tandem with the Socialist Party (3). The list of initiators also includes the Concordat des caisses-maladie suisses, the Confédération des syndicats chrétiens de la Suisse, the Fondation suisse pour l'énergie, the Fédération romande des consommateurs, the Swiss Farmers' Union, the Société suisse des employés de commerce and the Syndicat de la communication.
- interest groups: these groups or associations are not linked to the economic sector, but may defend political or ecological objectives, for example, and traditionally launch popular initiatives on themes close to their hearts. Examples include the Transport and Environment Association (also under its former name of Swiss Transport Association), the Swiss Pensioners' Association, the Swiss Tenants' Association, Campaign for an Independent and Neutral Switzerland, the Franz Weber Foundation (and its subsidiary Helvetia Nostra), the Swiss Pharmaceutical Society, the Touring Swiss Club, the Group for a Switzerland without an army, the WWF and also the mass retailer Denner.
- Ad-hoc committees account for the lion's share of cases, with more than half of all federal popular initiatives to their credit. While some of these committees were used as fronts for organizations that preferred to keep a low profile, mainly up until the end of the 1950s, the vast majority were made up of individuals who were determined to take action for a particular cause, but who did not claim to belong to a particular party or organization.

=== Statistics on the use of counter-proposals ===
Between 1891 and 1991, when faced with 184 successful popular initiatives, the Parliament issued a direct counter-proposal on 26 occasions (approximately 14.1%). In half of these cases (13), the initiators withdrew their proposal in favor of the parliamentary counter-proposal. These counter-proposals were subsequently approved by voters in 11 instances and rejected only twice. In the remaining cases where both the initiative and the counter-proposal were presented for a public vote, voters favored the initiative in two instances and the counter-proposal in six. In the remaining five cases, both the initiative and the counter-proposal were rejected. The use of the direct counter-proposal has shown limited variation over time. Excluding a peak of nine proposals during the 1971–1980 decade, the number of counter-proposals issued per decade typically ranges from one to three.

=== Number of initiatives submitted ===
Value in October 2010. Legend: Grey: initiatives pending, Green: initiatives put to the vote, Black: initiatives cancelled by Parliament, Blue: initiatives withdrawn by the initiative committee, Charcoal: initiatives not having obtained the required number of signatures

The graph opposite shows, by decade, the fate of federal popular initiatives submitted to the Federal Chancellery.

The history of the submission of federal popular initiatives can be divided into three distinct periods: the first began in 1891 and lasted until 1930 when fewer than one initiative was submitted per year; during the second period, from 1930 to 1970, the number more than doubled to around twenty per decade; and in the third period, from the end of the 1970s to the beginning of the 21st century, the number of initiatives submitted jumped by an average of four to six per year.

An analysis of the 217 federal popular initiatives registered with the Federal Chancellery between 1891 and 1991 (covering the first century of the instrument's existence) reveals that nearly half did not progress to a public vote. At least 31 initiatives failed to gather the necessary number of signatures. Due to limitations in record-keeping prior to the 1980s, the exact number of such failures in earlier decades cannot be definitively determined. Additionally, 66 initiatives were withdrawn by their proponents, two were declared invalid by the authorities, and two were rejected in public votes. Notably, only one initiative achieved approval by voters during this period.

=== Voting results ===
The graph opposite shows the results of successful federal popular initiatives by decade.

Value in October 2010. Legend: Grey: initiatives pending, Green: initiatives accepted, Red: initiatives rejected

Of the 115 initiatives put to the vote between 1891 and 1991, 103 were rejected by the people (one less by the cantons) and only twelve were approved, representing just 5.5% of all registered federal popular initiatives and 10.4% of all those put to the people. This 90% failure rate is regularly quoted in generic articles on federal popular initiatives. However, it does not take into account cases where the counter-proposal is accepted in place of the initiative, even though the political aims are comparable.

The table below shows the cumulative percentage of acceptance of federal popular initiatives by decade:

Cumulative percentage acceptance by decade

| Decade | N° of votes | N° yes | % |
|---|---|---|---|
| 1890s | 5 | 1 | 20,0 |
| 1900s | 8 | 2 | 25,0 |
| 1910s | 16 | 5 | 31,3 |
| 1920s | 23 | 6 | 26,1 |
| 1930 | 32 | 6 | 18,8 |
| 1940s | 40 | 7 | 17,5 |
| 1950s | 49 | 7 | 14,3 |
| 1960s | 57 | 7 | 12,3 |
| 1970s | 83 | 8 | 9,6 |
| 1980s | 115 | 11 | 9,6 |
| 1990s | 137 | 14 | 10,2 |
| 2000s | 151 | 17 | 11,3 |

=== Voter turnout trends ===
Voter turnout trends. The three highest turnouts (shown in red) were for the following initiatives: 1 "to combat the economic crisis and its effects" (84.38% – 1935) 2 "against foreign domination" (74.72% – 1970) 3 "against foreign domination and overpopulation of Switzerland" (70.33% – 1974). The three lowest votes (shown in green) were for the following initiatives: 1 "pour le contrôle renforcé des industries d'armement et pour l'interdiction d'exportation d'armes" (33.34% – 1972) 2 "Civil liability insurance for motor vehicles and bicycles" (33.54% – 1976) 3 "for the promotion of public transport" (31.23% – 1991)

At federal level, citizens over the age of 18 who are capable of discernment automatically join the electorate; no registration is necessary. They take part in around 4 to 5 votes a year.

Between 1890 and 2010, the turnout rate for votes on federal popular initiatives ranged from 31.23% (for the popular initiative "to promote public transport", voted on 3 March 1991) to 84.38% (for the popular initiative "to combat the economic crisis and its effects", voted on 2 June 1937), with an overall average of 48.3% of voters.

The average, maximum and minimum turnout values by decade are as follows:

Voter turnout by decade
| Decade | N° of votes | Average | Min. | Max. |
|---|---|---|---|---|
| 1890s | 5 | 59.24% | 49.18% | 71.88% |
| 1900s | 3 | 54.63% | 49.31% | 62.34% |
| 1910s | 8 | 57.93% | 45.59% | 68.23% |
| 1920s | 7 | 61.64% | 45.95% | 67.36% |
| 1930s | 9 | 62.47% | 54.33% | 84.38% |
| 1940s | 8 | 48.38% | 37.58% | 59.43% |
| 1950s | 9 | 52.39% | 40.09% | 61.85% |
| 1960s | 8 | 45.67% | 33.34% | 74.72% |
| 1970s | 26 | 44.10% | 32.91% | 70.33% |
| 1980s | 31 | 44.60% | 31.23% | 69.18% |
| 1990s | 44 | 45.36% | 35.23% | 58.26% |
| 2000s | 14 | 47.19% | 38.74% | 53.8% |

Turnout rose steadily until the 1930s, when it peaked, before dropping sharply below the average threshold of 50% in subsequent decades. Since the 1970s, when the rate was at its lowest, it has been rising slowly.

In her 1977 thesis, political scientist Thanh-Huyen Ballmer-Cao reviewed the socio-economic profile of political "non-participants", demonstrating that the majority of them are "individuals with a low level of education, in a low income bracket [...] young people, women [...]". She also explains the sharp rise in the non-participation rate in the 1970s, in particular, as a result of the introduction of women's suffrage at federal level in 1971: since women initially voted less than men on average, they were largely responsible for the drop in turnout observed during this period. Other specialists point to the multiplication of votes or the increasing complexity of issues to explain why Switzerland has the lowest turnout in Europe for federal votes. For example, in the final report of National Research Program No. 6, entitled Political decision-making in Switzerland: the genesis and implementation of legislation, political scientists Erich Gruner and Hans-Peter Hertig cite a lack of knowledge on the part of citizens as the reason for low voter turnout; they cite as an example the 15% of opponents to the 1979 atomic initiative who believed that, by voting no, they were opposing the construction of new atomic power plants.

A 2016 study by the University of Geneva shows that almost 90% of citizens vote regularly, but selectively. Depending on the study, between 10% and 20% of citizens are abstainers, 10–20% are regular voters and 60–80% are irregular voters.

== Bibliography ==
=== General book ===
- Nouvelle Histoire de la Suisse et des Suisses. Payot: Lausanne.
- Andrey, Georges (2007). Histoire de la Suisse pour les nuls. Paris.
- Aubert, Jean-François (1974). Petite histoire constitutionnelle de la Suisse. Francke: Bern.
- Aubert, Jean-François (1967). Traité de droit constitutionnel suisse. Neuchâtel: Ides et Calendes.

(2 volumes)

- Klöti; Knoepfel, Peter; Kriesi, Hanspeter; Linder, Wolf; Papadopoulos, Yannis; Sciarini, Pascal (2006). Manuel de la politique suisse. Verlag Neue Zürcher Zeitung. ISBN 978-3-03823-267-4.
- Kriesi, Hanspeter; Trechsel, Alexander H. (2008). The Politics of Switzerland: Continuity and Change in a Consensus Democracy. Cambridge University Press. ISBN 978-0-521-60631-8.
- Linder, Wolf (1987). La décision politique en Suisse: genèse et mise en œuvre de la législation. Lausanne: Éditions Réalités sociales. ISBN 2-88146-024-0.

Final report of National Research Program no. 6

- Papadopoulos, Yannis (2000). Les processus de décision fédéraux en Suisse. Éditions L'Harmattan. ISBN 978-2-7384-5776-9.
- Skenderovic, Damir (2009). The radical right in Switzerland: continuity and change 1945-2000. New York: Berghahn Books. ISBN 978-1-84545-580-4.

=== Specialized books ===
- L'initiative populaire: une centenaire bien vivante. Bern: Federal Chancellery. 1991.
- Auer, Andreas (1996). Les origines de la démocratie directe. Helbing Lichtenhahn: Direct Democracy series. ISBN 3-7190-1462-2.

Proceedings of the colloquium organized on 27–29 April 1995 by the Faculty of Law and C2D

- Auer, Andreas (2001). Sans délais et sans limites, l'initiative populaire à la croisée des chemins. Helbing Lichtenhahn. ISBN 3-7190-1969-1.

Actes de la journée scientifique organisée le 26 mai 2000 par le Centre d'études et de documentation sur la démocratie directe

- Ballmer-Cao, Thanh-Huyen (1980). Analyse des niveaux de participation et non-participation politiques en Suisse. Bern: Peter Lang.

Thesis in economic and social sciences, Geneva, 1977

- Delley, Jean-Daniel (1978). L'initiative populaire en Suisse: mythe et réalité de la démocratie directe.
- Grisel, Étienne (2004). Initiative et référendum populaires, traité de la démocratie semi-directe en droit suisse.
- Fabio Pontiggia, Réformer ou non-la démocratie directe en Suisse ? : l'initiave [i.e. initiative] populaire entre us et abus, Biel, Éditions Libertas, 1990.
- Rouquet, Philippe (1994). De l'initiative populaire en Suisse fédérale. Lille: Atelier national de reproduction des thèses de l'Université de Lille III. ISSN 0294-1767.

=== Articles ===
- Auer, Andrea (1985). "Problèmes fondamentaux de la démocratie suisse". Revue de droit suisse. 1: 5–110.
- Report presented at the 118th annual meeting of the Swiss Society of Jurists. Crans-Montana. 1984.
- Darbellay, Jean (1963). ""Suisse: L'initiative populaire et les limites de la révision constitutionnelle"". Revue du droit public et de la science politique en France et à l'étranger. 8. Paris: Pichon et Durand-Auzias: 714–744.
- Dupraz, Louis (1956). "De l'initiative en révision de la constitution dans les Etats suisses, en particulier de l'initiative populaire". Actes de la société suisse des juristes. Basel: Helbing & Lichtenhahn: 264–590.

== See also ==
- Double majority
- Popular initiative
- Popular initiative in Switzerland
