= List of diplomatic missions of Switzerland =

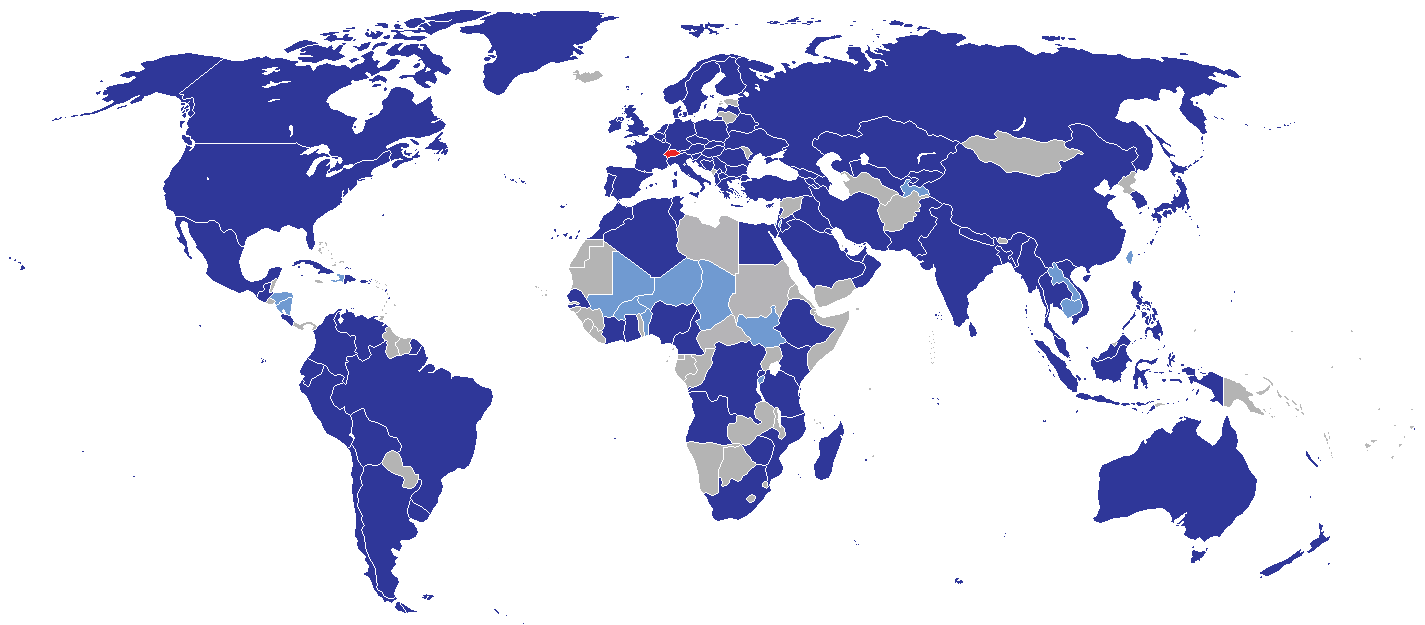
Countries hosting a Swiss diplomatic mission.

This is a list of diplomatic missions of Switzerland.

Switzerland is well known as a protecting power, having used its embassies abroad to represent the interests of states hostile to each other since the Franco-Prussian War. In the Second World War Switzerland served as protecting power for 35 countries on both sides—its embassy in Washington represented Germany, Italy, Japan, and Vichy France. In many post-war conflicts, including in the Democratic Republic of Congo, South Asia, the Middle East, Serbia, and Georgia, Switzerland has provided a continuity of representation after formal relations were severed between belligerents, facilitating the delivery of humanitarian aid and conflict resolution.

Since 1919, Switzerland has also represented the Principality of Liechtenstein in those countries wherein Liechtenstein itself does not maintain consular representation. Owing to its size and population, Liechtenstein maintains a very small network of diplomatic missions.

Honorary consulates are excluded from this listing.

== Current missions ==
=== Africa ===
Host country	Host city	Mission	Concurrent accreditation	Ref.
Algeria	Algiers	Embassy		
Angola	Luanda	Embassy	Countries: São Tomé and Príncipe	
Benin	Cotonou	Cooperation office & consular agency (Note: Subordinate to the Swiss embassy in Accra, Ghana.)		
Burkina Faso	Ouagadougou	Cooperation office & consular agency (Note: Subordinate to the Swiss embassy in Abidjan, Ivory Coast.)		
Burundi	Bujumbura	Cooperation office & consular agency (Note: Subordinate to the Swiss embassy in Nairobi, Kenya.)		
Cameroon	Yaoundé	Embassy	Countries: Central African Republic; Equatorial Guinea	
Chad	N'Djamena	Cooperation office & consular agency (Note: Subordinate to the Swiss embassy in Abuja, Nigeria.)		
Congo-Kinshasa	Kinshasa	Embassy	Countries: Congo-Brazzaville; Gabon	
Egypt	Cairo	Embassy (Note: Serves as protecting power for Iran.)		
Ethiopia	Addis Ababa	Embassy	Countries: Djibouti; South Sudan; International Organizations: African Union; Intergovernmental Authority on Development; United Nations Economic Commission for Africa	
Ghana	Accra	Embassy	Countries: Benin; Togo	
Ivory Coast	Abidjan	Embassy	Countries: Burkina Faso; Guinea; Liberia; Sierra Leone	
Kenya	Nairobi	Embassy	Countries: Eritrea; Somalia; Uganda; International Organizations: United Nations; United Nations Environment Programme; United Nations Human Settlements Programme	
Mali	Bamako	Cooperation office & consular agency (Note: Subordinate to the Swiss embassy in Dakar, Senegal.)		
Madagascar	Antananarivo	Embassy	Countries: Comoros; Seychelles	
Morocco	Rabat	Embassy		
Mozambique	Maputo	Embassy		
Niger	Niamey	Cooperation office & consular agency		
Nigeria	Abuja	Embassy	Countries: Chad; Niger	
Nigeria	Lagos	Consulate-General	Countries: Chad; Niger	
Rwanda	Kigali	Embassy		
Senegal	Dakar	Embassy	Countries: Cape Verde; Gambia; Guinea-Bissau; Mali; Mauritania	
South Africa	Pretoria	Embassy	Countries: Botswana; Eswatini; Lesotho; Mauritius; Namibia	
South Africa	Cape Town	Consulate-General	Countries: Botswana; Eswatini; Lesotho; Mauritius; Namibia	
South Sudan	Juba	Cooperation office & consular agency (Note: Subordinate to the Swiss embassy in Addis Ababa, Ethiopia.)		
Tanzania	Dar es Salaam	Embassy	Countries: Burundi	
Tunisia	Tunis	Embassy	Countries: Libya	
Zimbabwe	Harare	Embassy	Countries: Malawi; Zambia	

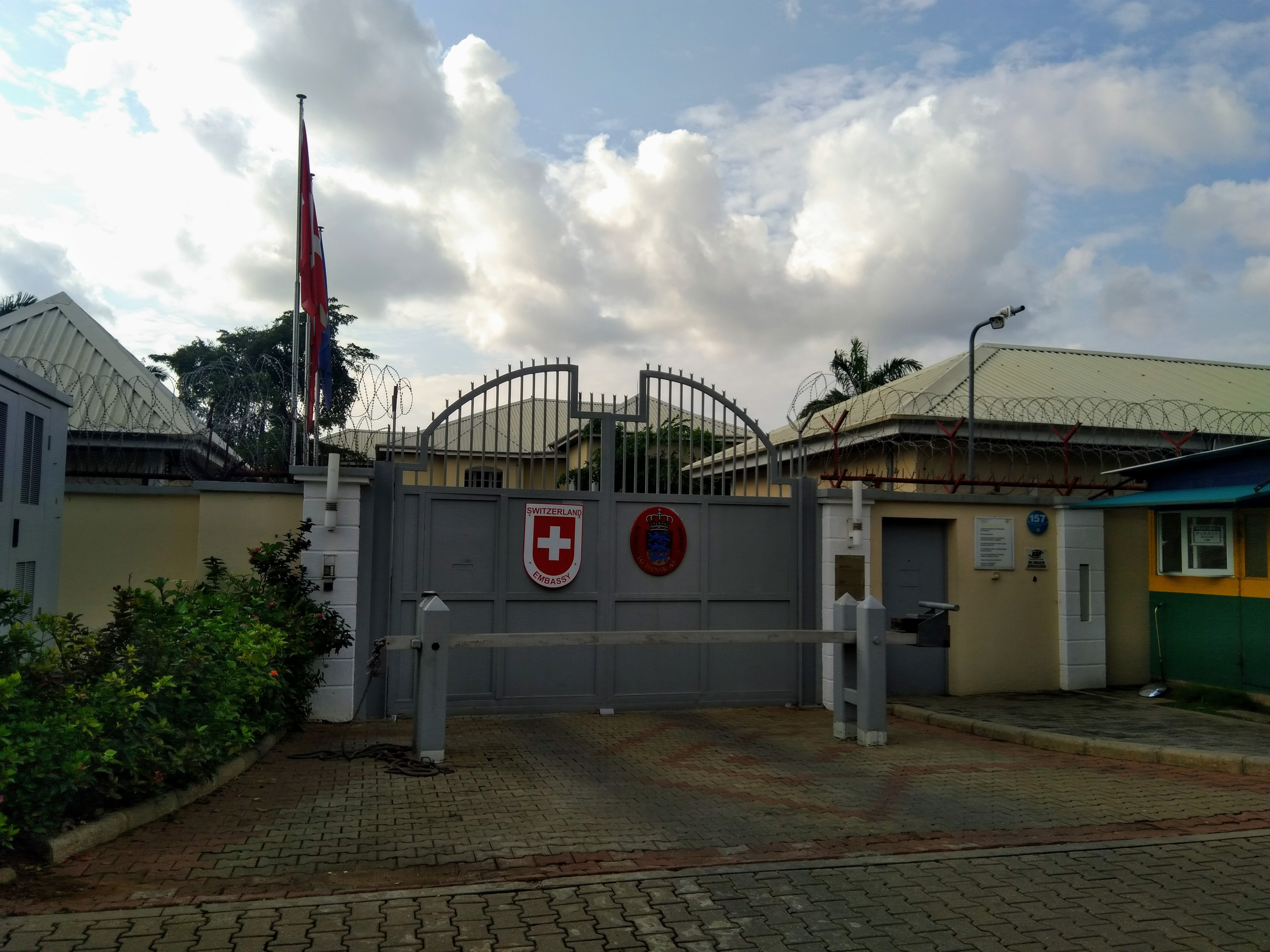
Embassy in Abuja

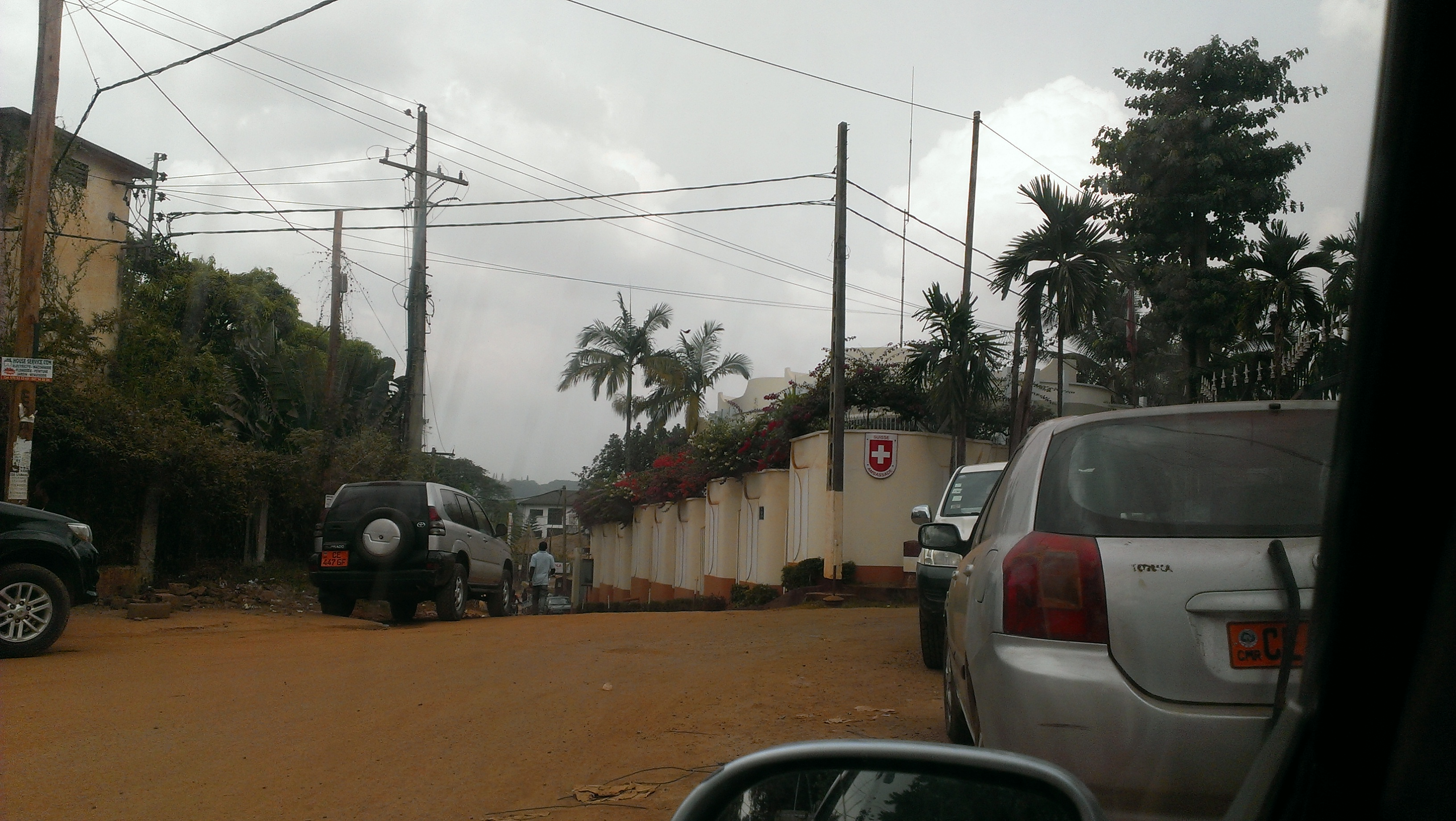
Embassy in Yaoundé

=== Americas ===
Host country	Host city	Mission	Concurrent accreditation	Ref.
Argentina	Buenos Aires	Embassy		
Bolivia	La Paz	Embassy		
Brazil	Brasília	Embassy		
Brazil	Rio de Janeiro	Consulate-General		
Brazil	São Paulo	Consulate-General		
Canada	Ottawa	Embassy	Countries: Bahamas	
Canada	Montreal	Consulate-General	Countries: Bahamas	
Canada	Vancouver	Consulate-General	Countries: Bahamas	
Chile	Santiago de Chile	Embassy		
Colombia	Bogotá	Embassy		
Costa Rica	San José	Embassy	Countries: El Salvador; Nicaragua; Panama	
Cuba	Havana	Embassy	Countries: Jamaica	
Dominican Republic	Santo Domingo	Embassy	Countries: Antigua and Barbuda; Dominica; Haiti; Saint Kitts and Nevis	
Ecuador	Quito	Embassy (Note: Serves as protecting power for Mexico.)		
Guatemala	Guatemala City	Embassy	Countries: Honduras	
Haiti	Port-au-Prince	Cooperation office		
Honduras	Tegucigalpa	Cooperation office & consular agency (Note: Subordinate to the Swiss embassy in San José, Costa Rica.)		
Mexico	Mexico City	Embassy (Note: Serves as protecting power for Ecuador.)	Countries: Belize	
Nicaragua	Managua	Cooperation office & consular agency		
Peru	Lima	Embassy		
United States	Washington, D.C.	Embassy	International Organizations: Organization of American States (Note: Accredited as an observer mission.)	
United States	Atlanta	Consulate-General	International Organizations: Organization of American States	
United States	Chicago	Consulate-General	International Organizations: Organization of American States	
United States	New York City	Consulate-General	International Organizations: Organization of American States	
United States	San Francisco	Consulate-General	International Organizations: Organization of American States	
United States	Boston	Consulate	International Organizations: Organization of American States	
Uruguay	Montevideo	Embassy	Countries: Paraguay	
Venezuela	Caracas	Embassy	Countries: Barbados; Grenada; Guyana; Saint Vincent and the Grenadines; Saint Lucia; Suriname; Trinidad and Tobago	

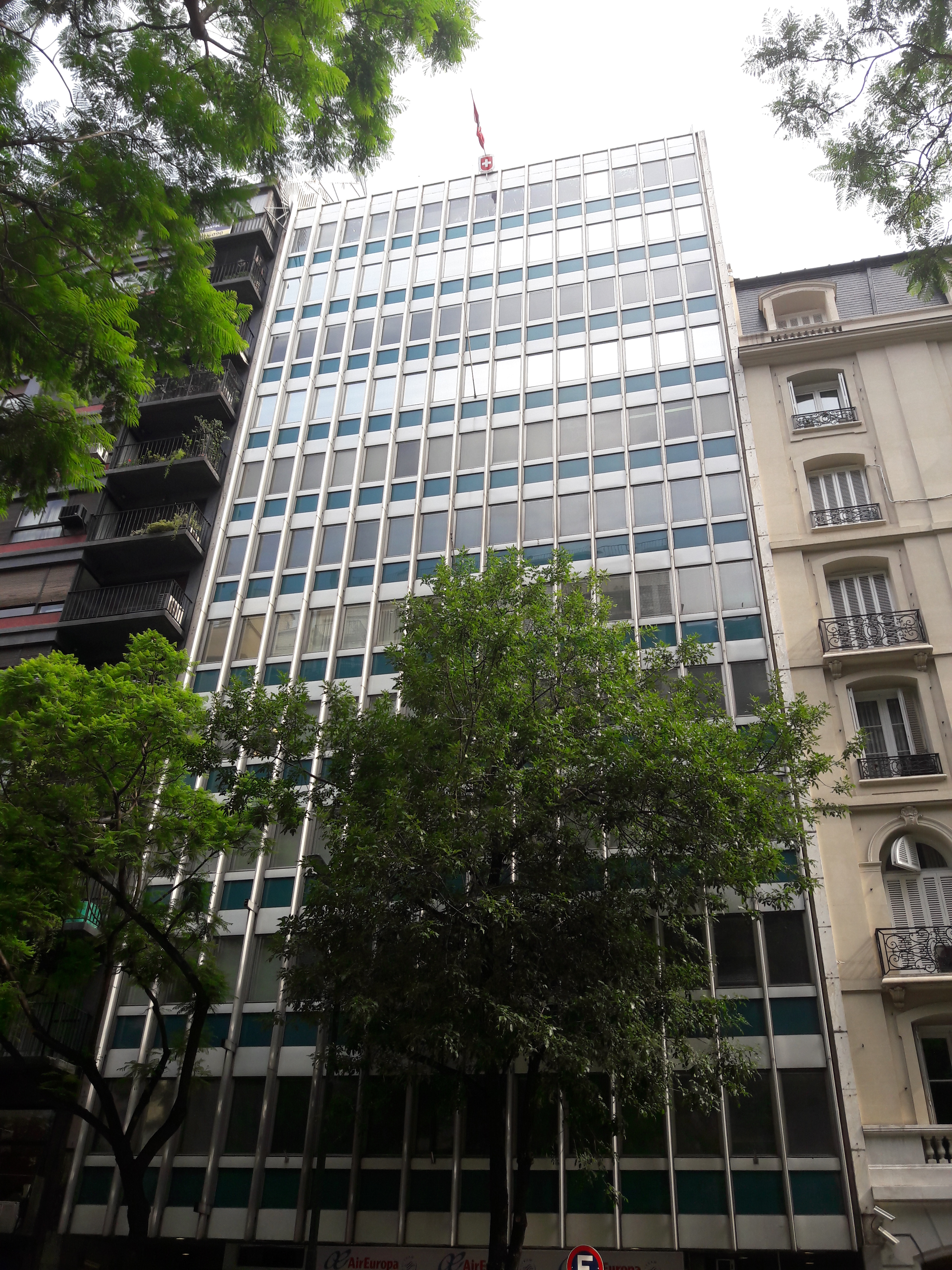
Embassy in Buenos Aires

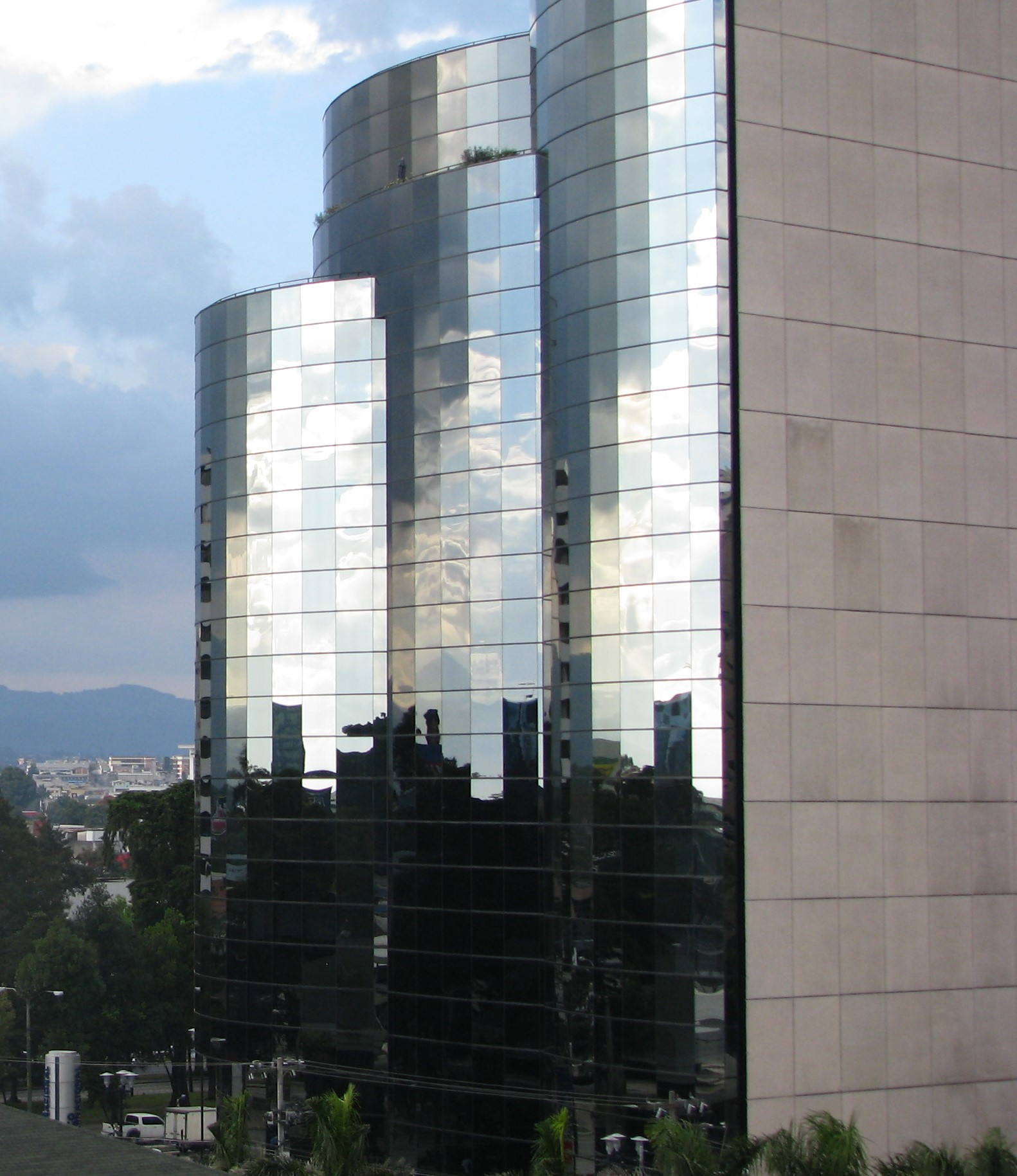
Building hosting the Embassy in Guatemala City

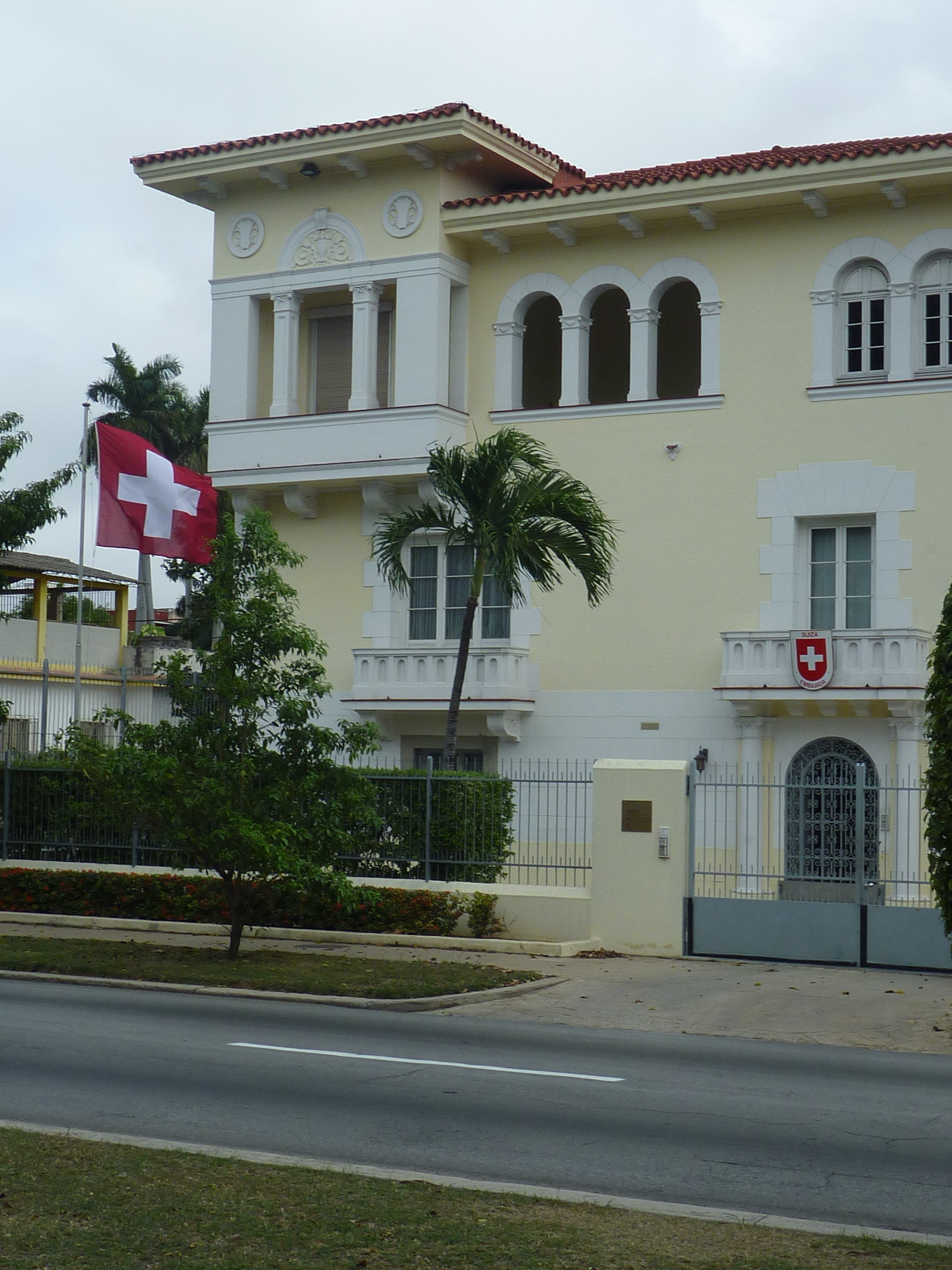
Embassy in Havana

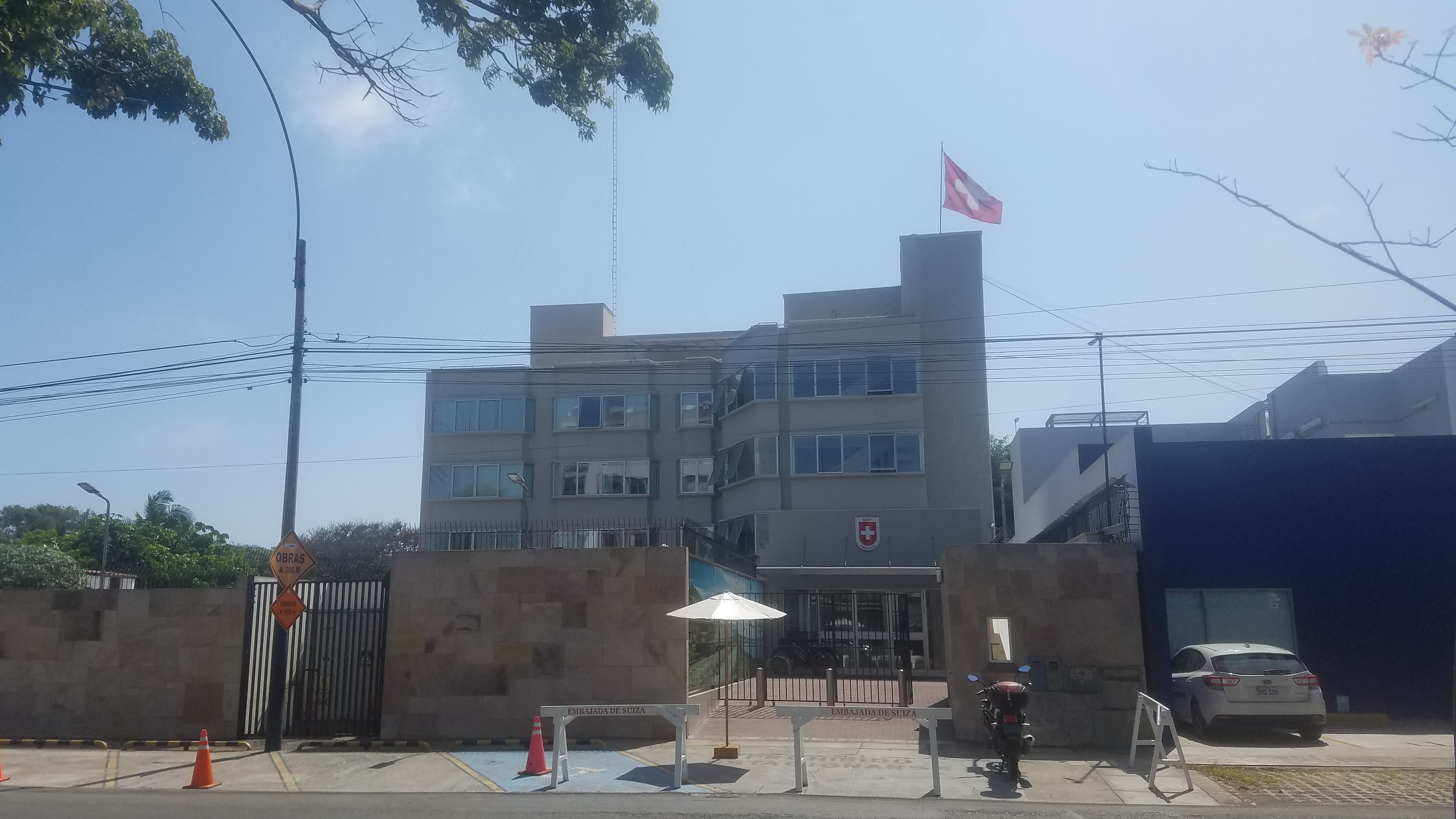
Embassy in Lima

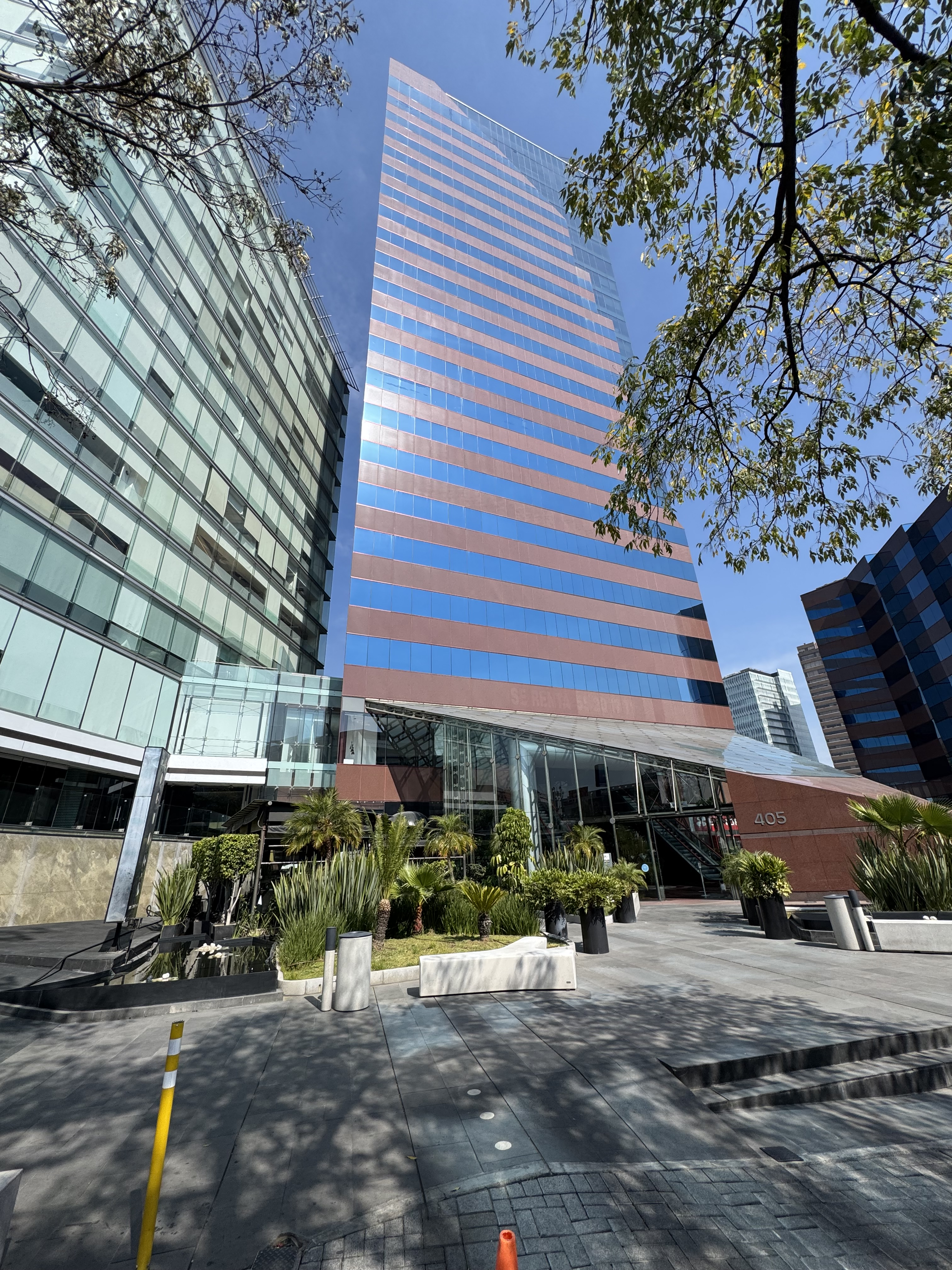
Building hosting the Embassy in Mexico City

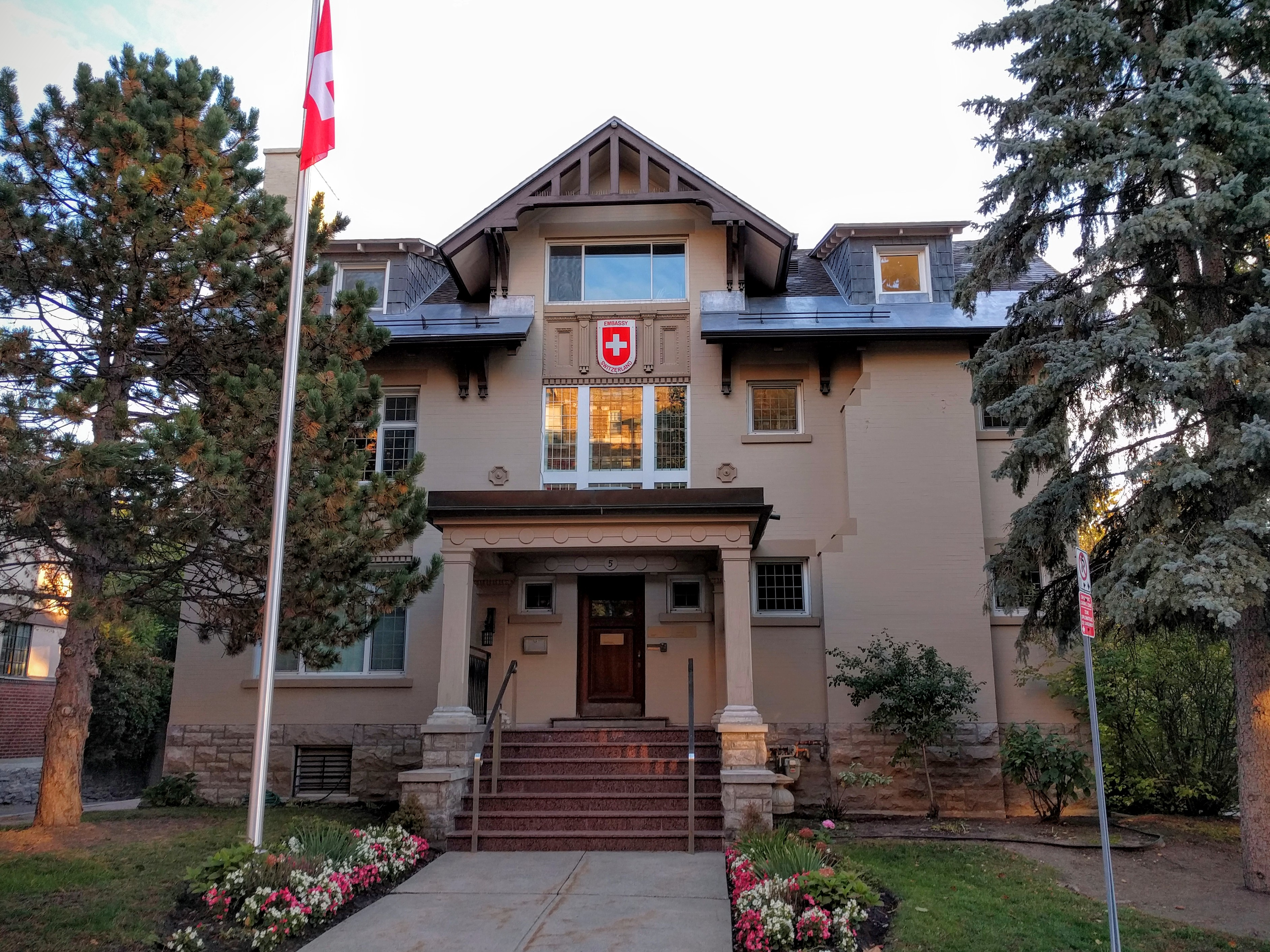
Embassy in Ottawa

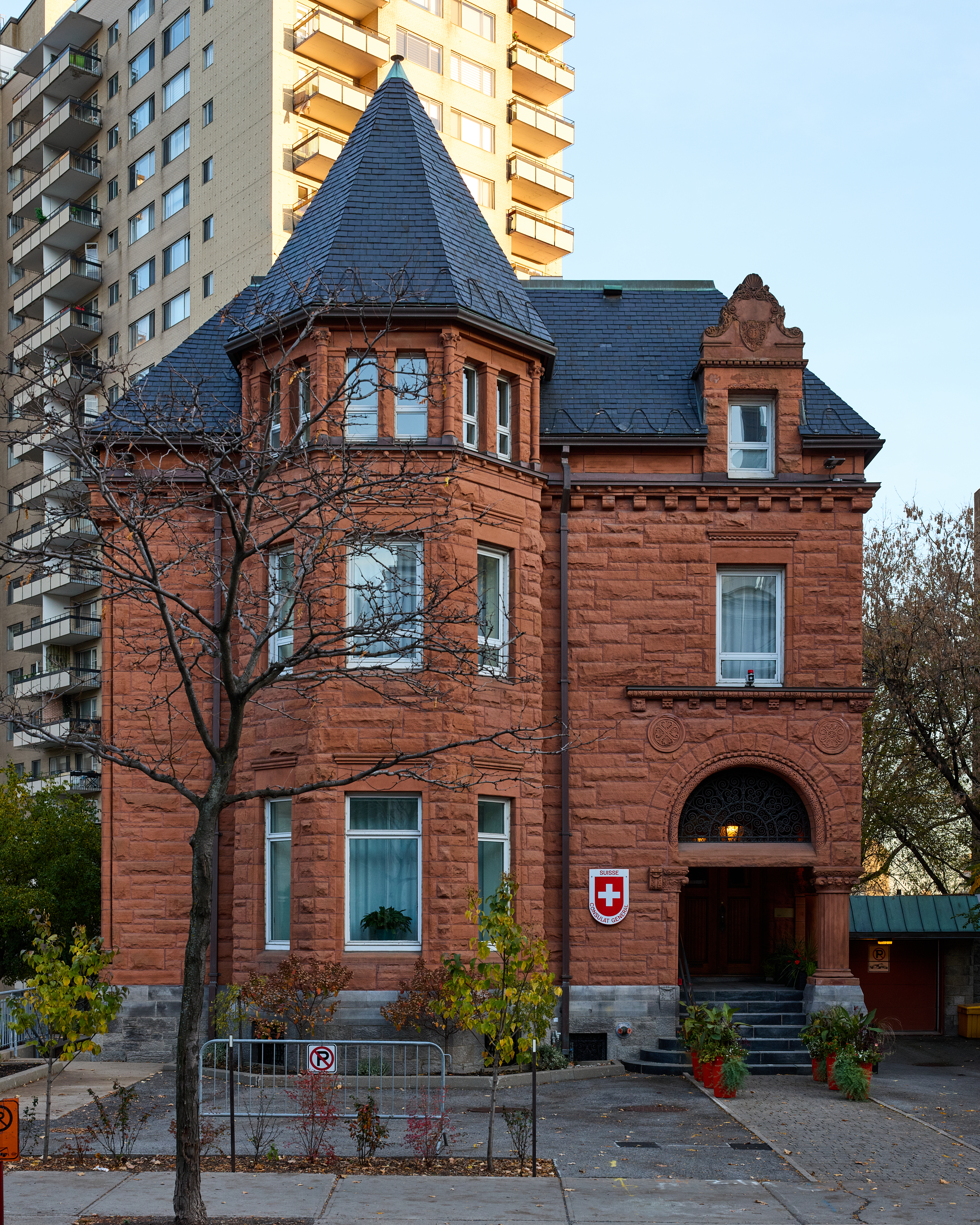
Consulate-General in Montreal

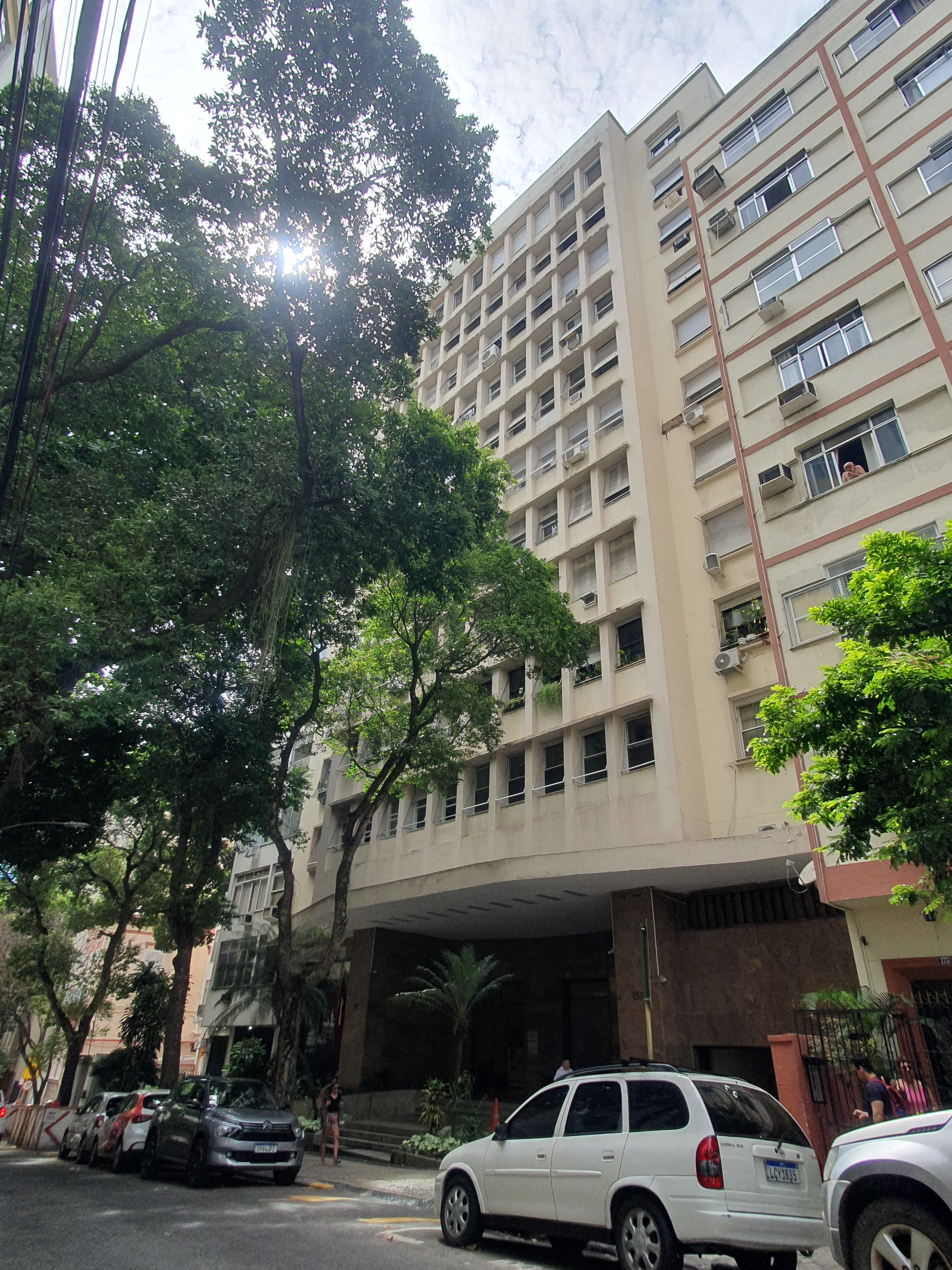
Building hosting the Consulate-General in Rio de Janeiro

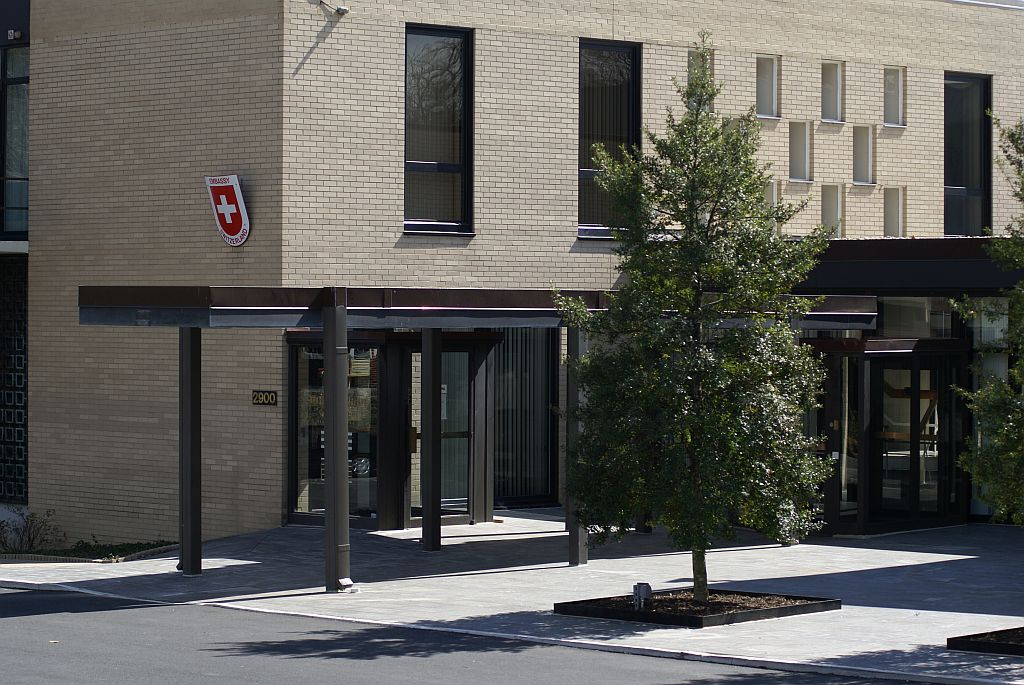
Embassy in Washington, D.C.

Consulate-General in San Francisco

=== Asia ===
Host country	Host city	Mission	Concurrent accreditation	Ref.
Armenia	Yerevan	Embassy		
Azerbaijan	Baku	Embassy	Countries: Turkmenistan	
Bangladesh	Dhaka	Embassy		
Cambodia	Phnom Penh	Cooperation office & consular agency (Note: Subordinate to the Swiss embassy in Bangkok, Thailand.)		
China	Beijing	Embassy	Countries: Mongolia; North Korea	
China	Guangzhou	Consulate-General	Countries: Mongolia; North Korea	
China	Hong Kong	Consulate-General	Countries: Mongolia; North Korea	
China	Shanghai	Consulate-General	Countries: Mongolia; North Korea	
Georgia	Tbilisi	Embassy (Note: Serves as protecting power for Russia.)		
India	New Delhi	Embassy	Countries: Bhutan	
India	Bangalore	Consulate-General	Countries: Bhutan	
India	Mumbai	Consulate-General	Countries: Bhutan	
Indonesia	Jakarta	Embassy	Countries: Timor-Leste; International Organizations: Association of Southeast Asian Nations	
Iran	Tehran	Embassy		
Iraq	Baghdad	Embassy		
Israel	Tel Aviv	Embassy		
Japan	Tokyo	Embassy		
Japan	Osaka	Consulate		
Jordan	Amman	Embassy	Countries: Iraq	
Kazakhstan	Astana	Embassy	Countries: Tajikistan	
Kuwait	Kuwait City	Embassy		
Kyrgyzstan	Bishkek	Embassy		
Laos	Vientiane	Cooperation office & consular agency		
Lebanon	Beirut	Embassy	Countries: Syria	
Malaysia	Kuala Lumpur	Embassy		
Myanmar	Yangon	Embassy		
North Korea	Pyongyang	Diplomatic office		
Nepal	Kathmandu	Embassy		
Oman	Muscat	Embassy	Countries: Yemen	
Pakistan	Islamabad	Embassy	Countries: Afghanistan	
Palestine	Ramallah	Representative office		
Philippines	Manila	Embassy	Countries: Marshall Islands; Micronesia; Palau	
Qatar	Doha	Embassy		
Republic of China (Taiwan) (Note: Switzerland does not have formal relations with Taiwan, since the establishment of relations with the People's Republic of China in 1950. Nonetheless, its trade office in Taipei functions as a de facto embassy.)	Taipei	Trade office		
Saudi Arabia	Riyadh	Embassy		
Singapore	Singapore	Embassy	Countries: Brunei	
South Korea	Seoul	Embassy		
Sri Lanka	Colombo	Embassy	Countries: Maldives	
Tajikistan	Dushanbe	Cooperation office & consular agency (Note: Subordinate to the Swiss embassy in Astana, Kazakhstan.)		
Thailand	Bangkok	Embassy	Countries: Cambodia; Laos; Multilateral Organizations: UNESCAP (Note: Accredited as an observer mission.)	
Turkey	Ankara	Embassy		
Turkey	Istanbul	Consulate-General		
Uzbekistan	Tashkent	Embassy		
United Arab Emirates	Abu Dhabi	Embassy	Countries: Bahrain	
United Arab Emirates	Dubai	Consulate-General	Countries: Bahrain	
Vietnam	Hanoi	Embassy		
Vietnam	Ho Chi Minh City	Consulate-General		

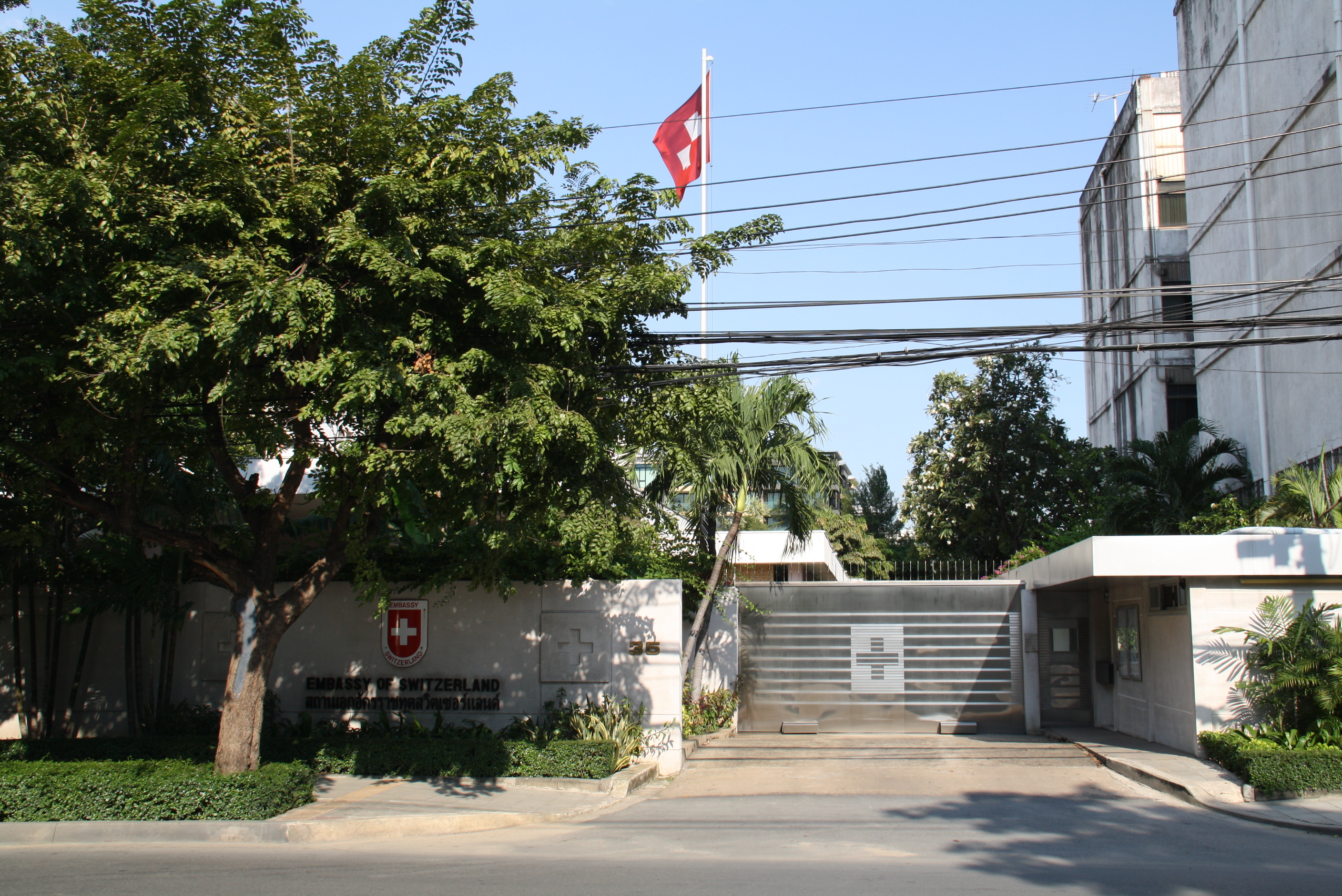
Embassy in Bangkok

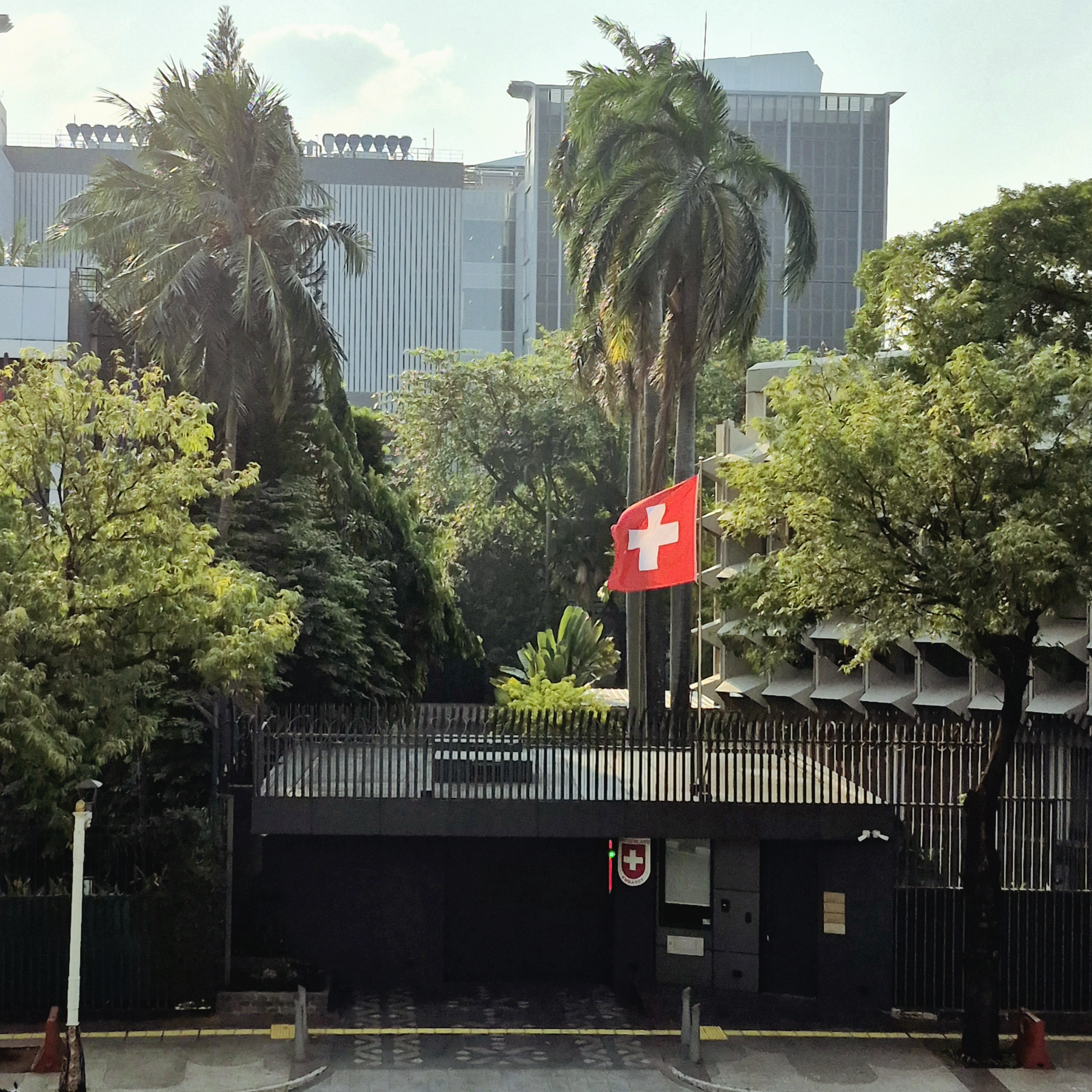
Embassy in Jakarta

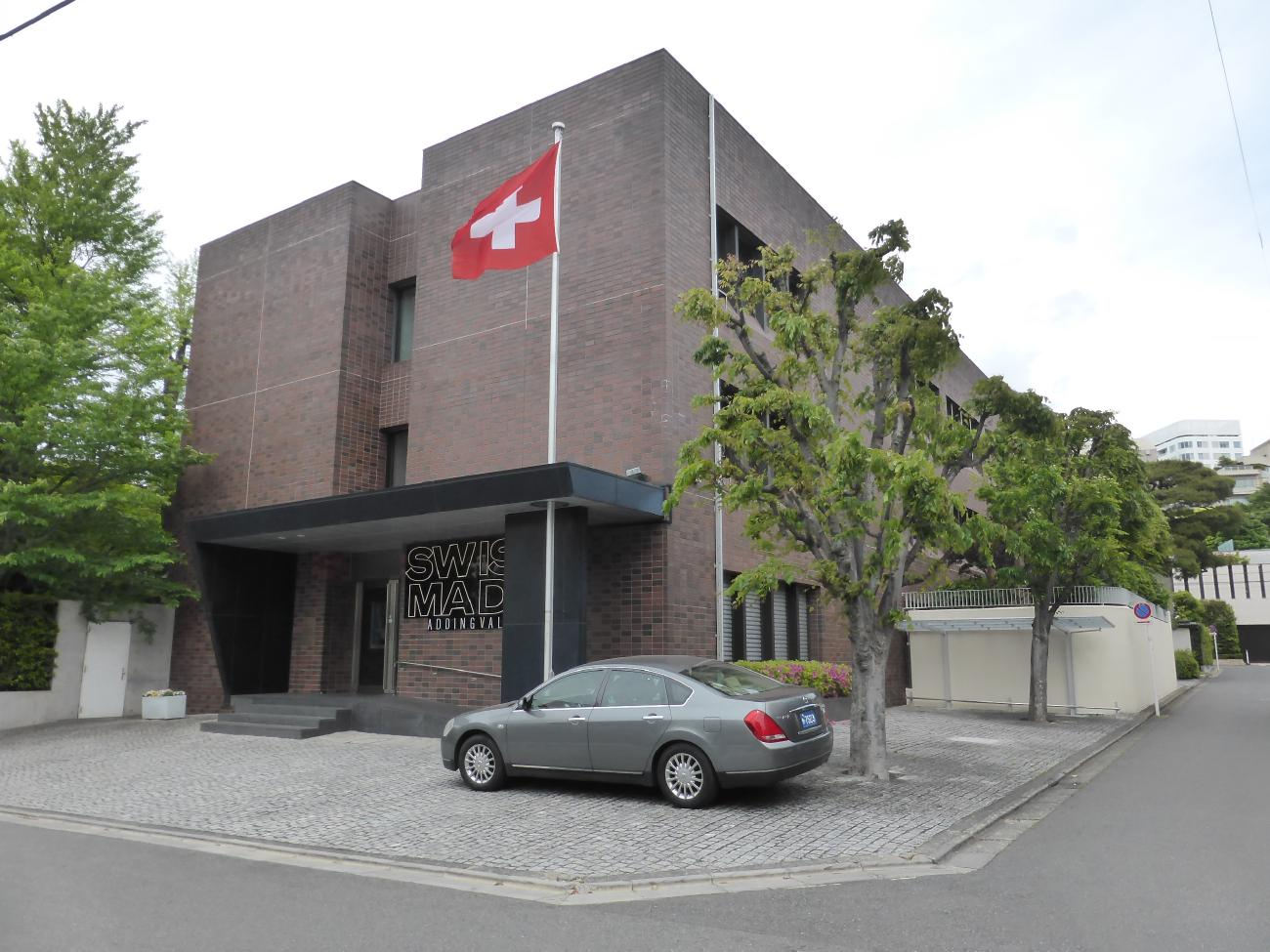
Embassy in Tokyo

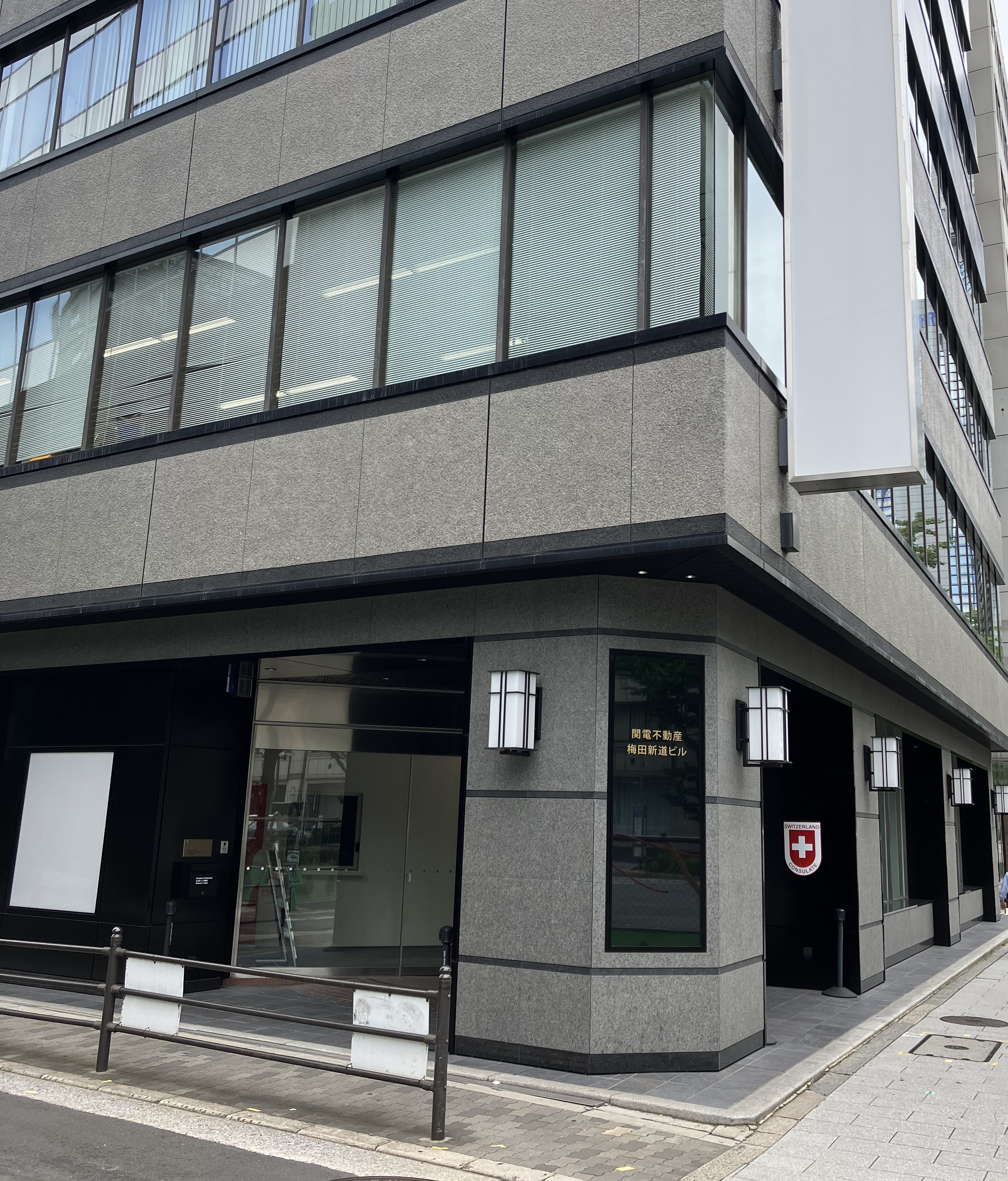
Consulate in Osaka

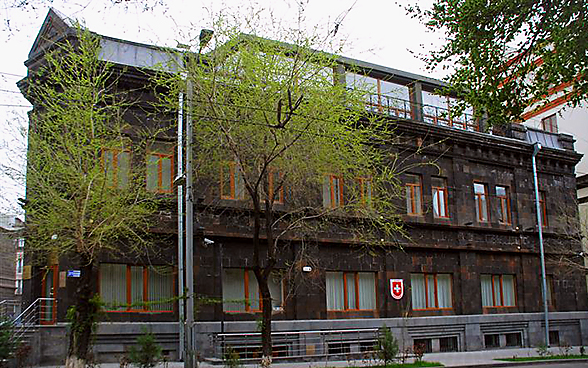
Embassy in Yerevan

=== Europe ===
Host country	Host city	Mission	Concurrent accreditation	Ref.
Albania	Tirana	Embassy		
Austria	Vienna	Embassy		
Belarus	Minsk	Embassy		
Belgium	Brussels	Embassy		
Bosnia and Herzegovina	Sarajevo	Embassy		
Bulgaria	Sofia	Embassy		
Croatia	Zagreb	Embassy		
Cyprus	Nicosia	Embassy		
Czech Republic	Prague	Embassy		
Denmark	Copenhagen	Embassy		
Finland	Helsinki	Embassy		
France	Paris	Embassy	Countries: Monaco	
France	Lyon	Consulate-General	Countries: Monaco	
France	Marseille	Consulate-General	Countries: Monaco	
France	Strasbourg	Consulate-General	Countries: Monaco	
Germany	Berlin	Embassy		
Germany	Frankfurt	Consulate-General		
Germany	Munich	Consulate-General		
Germany	Stuttgart	Consulate-General		
Greece	Athens	Embassy		
Holy See (Note: The Swiss Embassy to the Holy See is located outside Vatican territory in Rome.)	Rome	Embassy		
Hungary	Budapest	Embassy		
Ireland	Dublin	Embassy		
Italy	Rome	Embassy	Countries: Malta; San Marino	
Italy	Milan	Consulate-General	Countries: Malta; San Marino	
Kosovo	Pristina	Embassy		
Latvia	Riga	Embassy	Countries: Estonia; Lithuania	
Luxembourg	Luxembourg City	Embassy		
Netherlands	The Hague	Embassy		
North Macedonia	Skopje	Embassy		
Norway	Oslo	Embassy	Countries: Iceland	
Poland	Warsaw	Embassy		
Portugal	Lisbon	Embassy		
Romania	Bucharest	Embassy		
Russia	Moscow (Note: Serves as protecting power for Georgia.)	Embassy		
Russia	Saint Petersburg	Consulate-General		
Serbia	Belgrade	Embassy	Countries: Montenegro	
Slovakia	Bratislava	Embassy		
Slovenia	Ljubljana	Embassy		
Spain	Madrid	Embassy	Countries: Andorra	
Spain	Barcelona	Consulate-General	Countries: Andorra	
Sweden	Stockholm	Embassy		
Ukraine	Kyiv	Embassy	Countries: Moldova	
United Kingdom	London	Embassy		

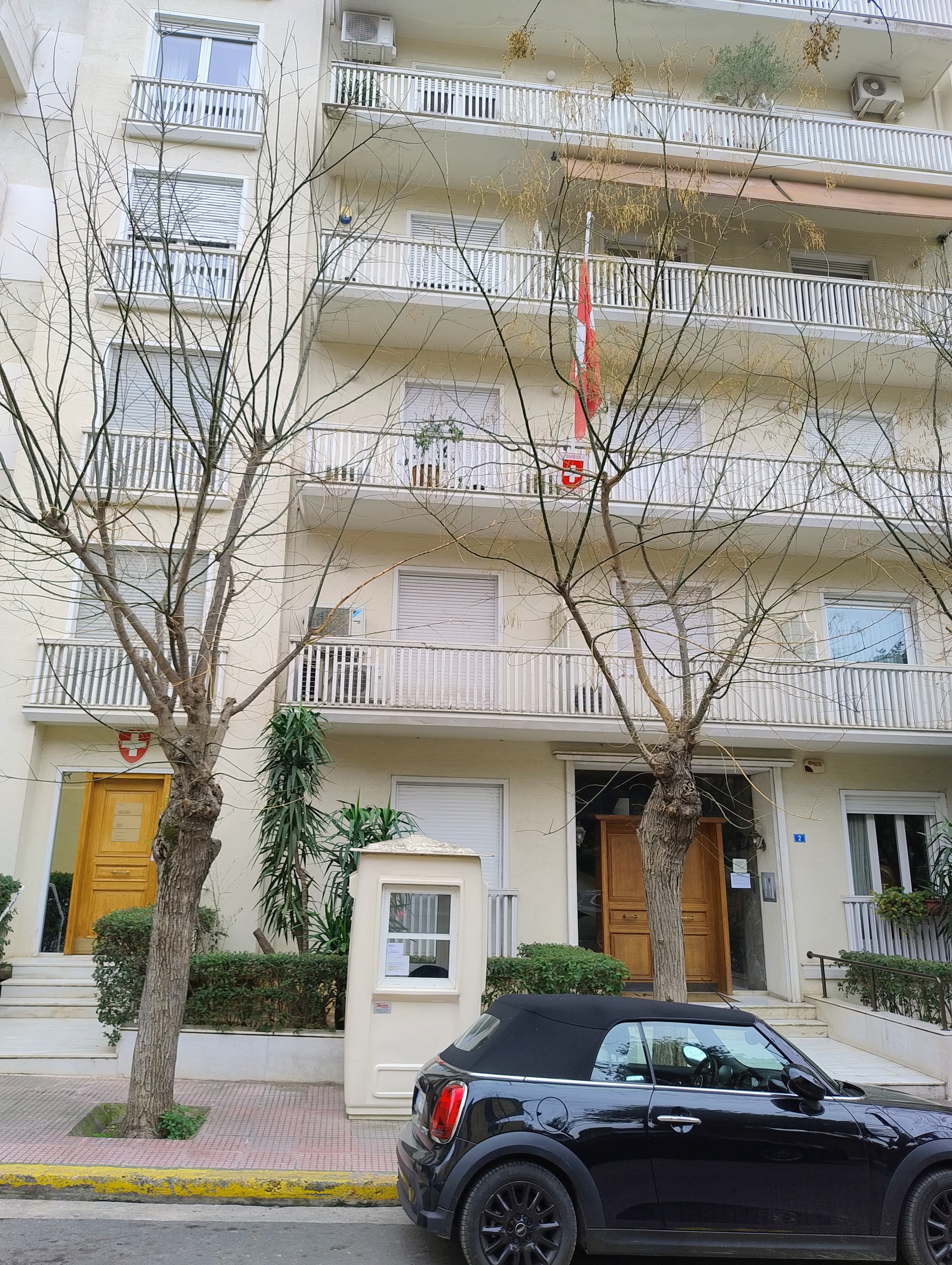
Embassy in Athens

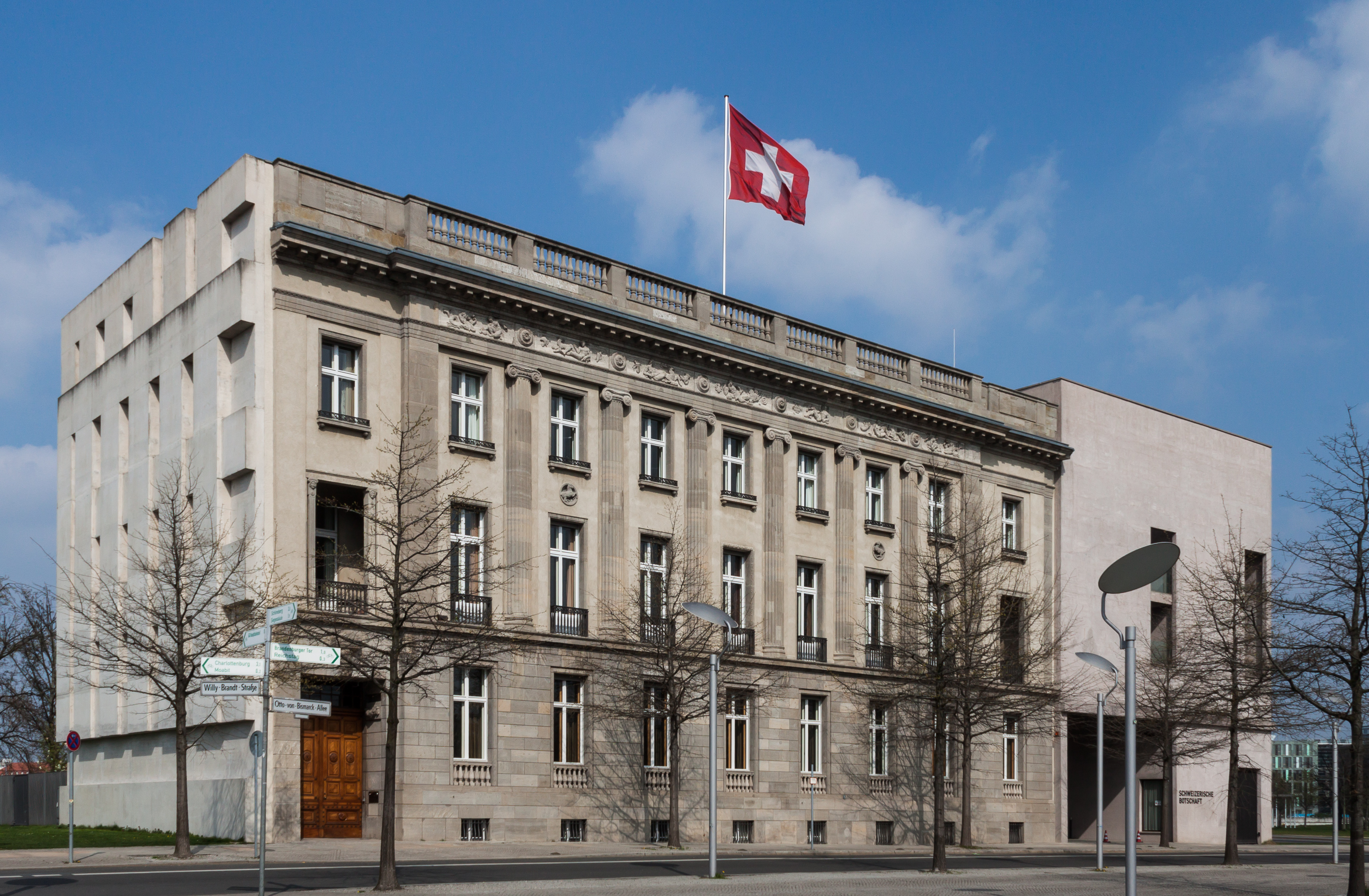
Embassy in Berlin

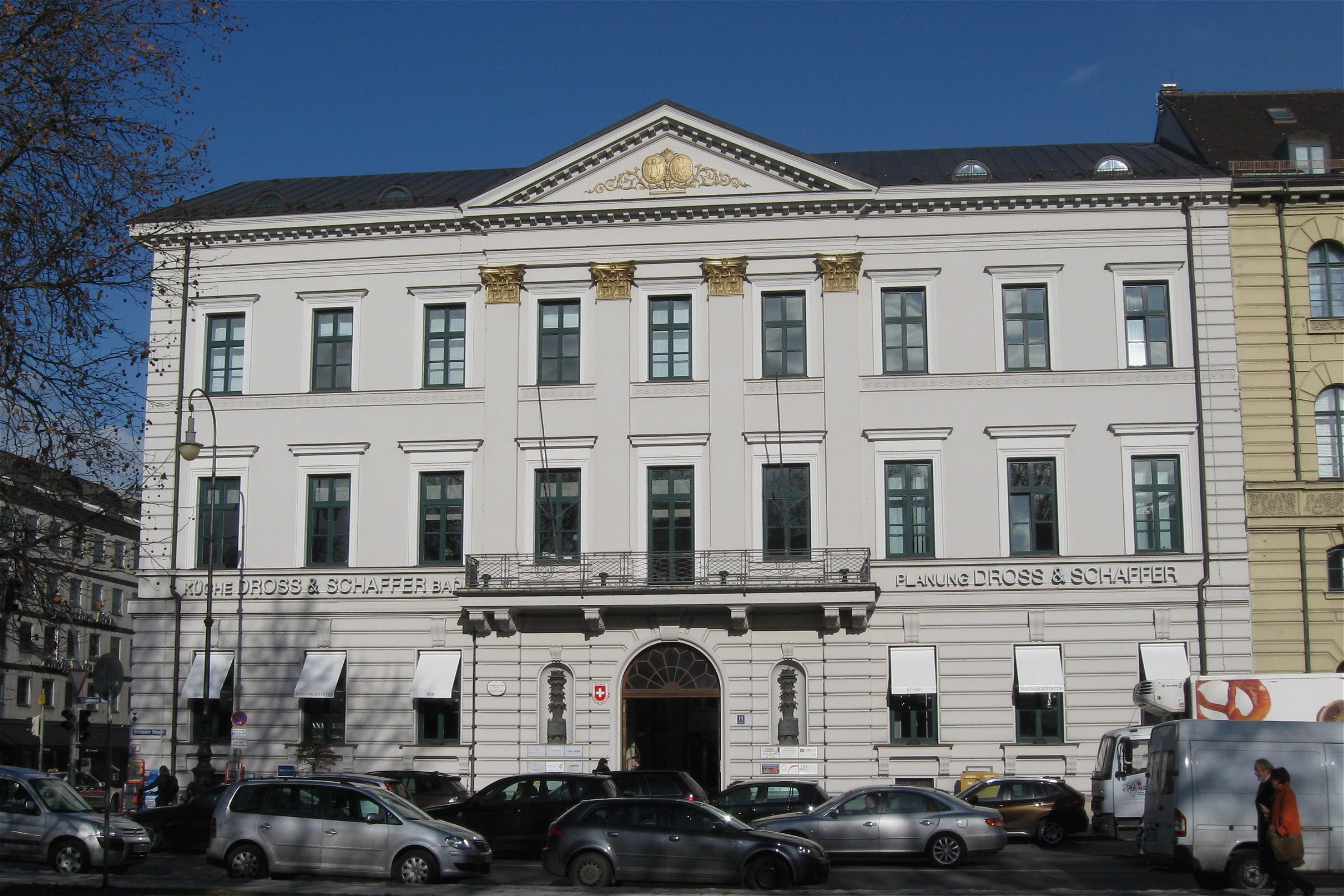
Consulate-General in Munich

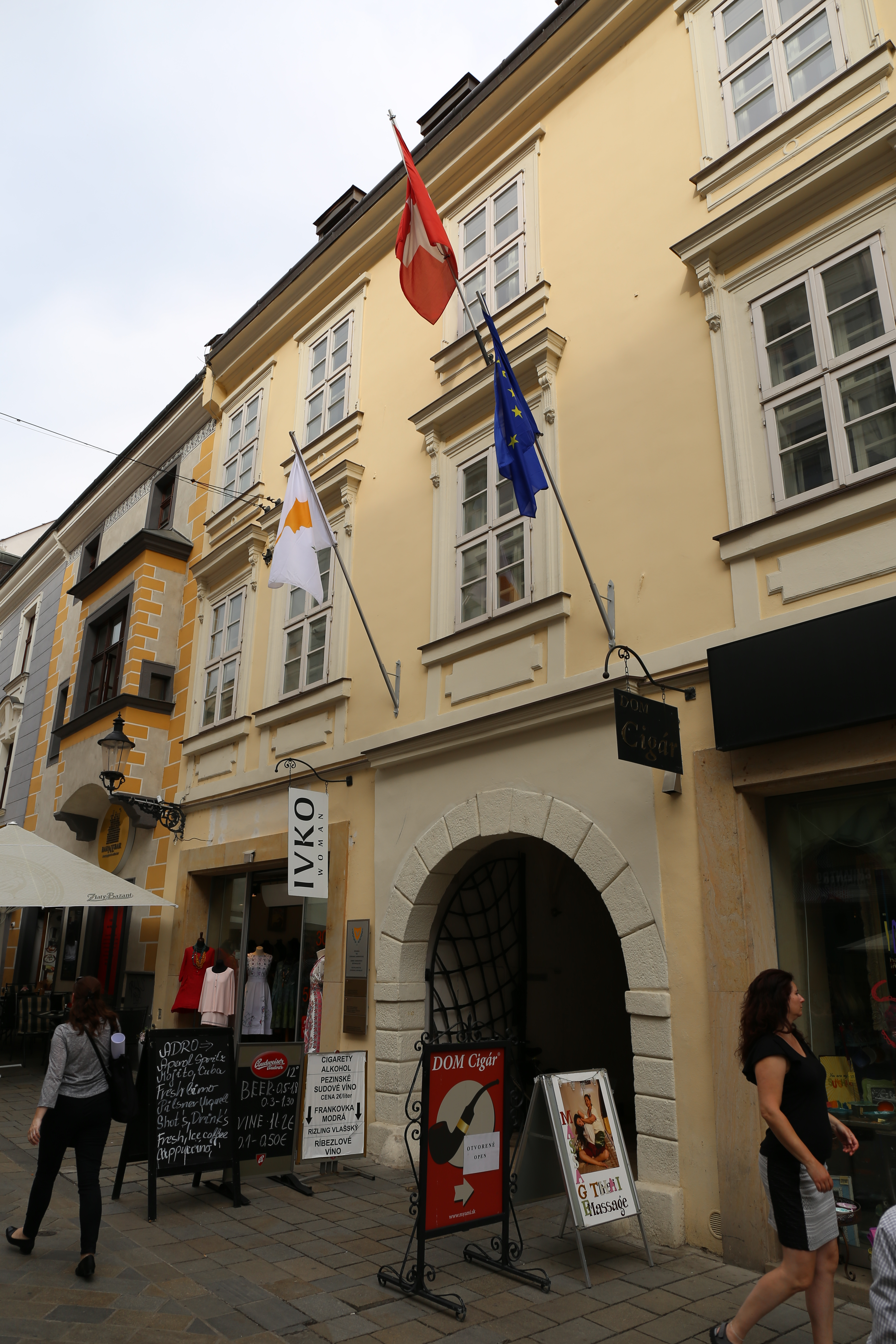
Embassy in Bratislava

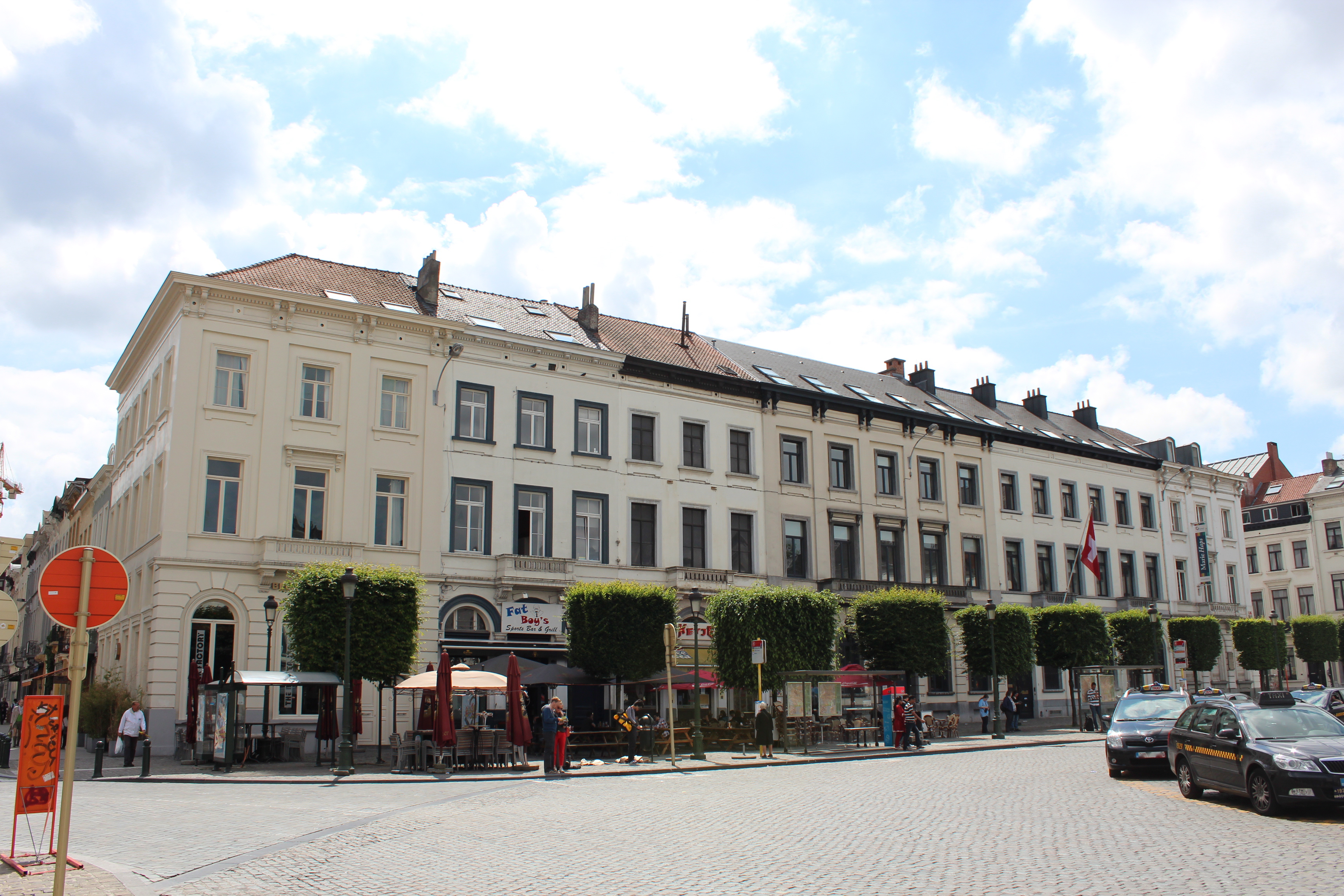
Embassy in Brussels

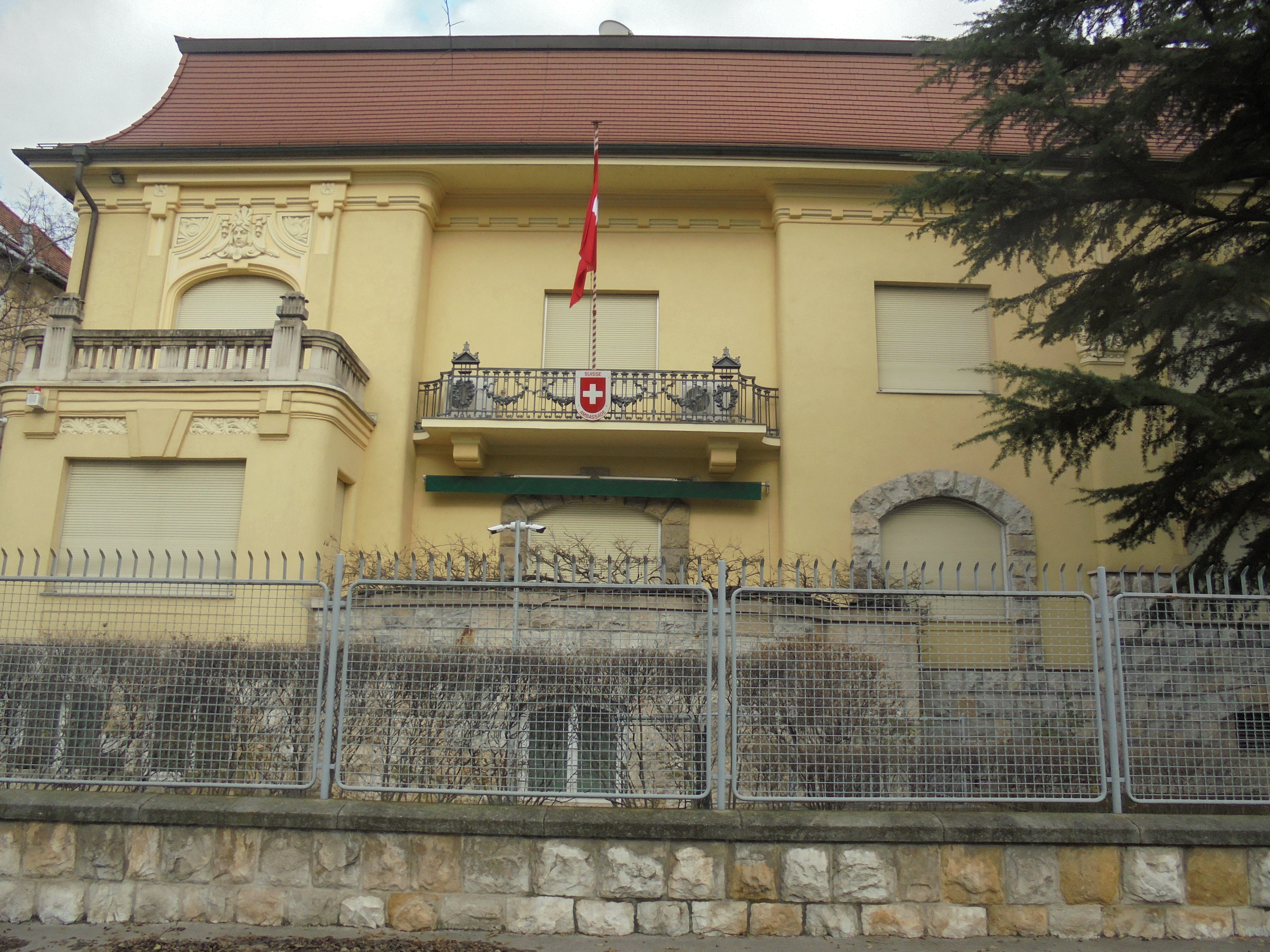
Embassy in Budapest

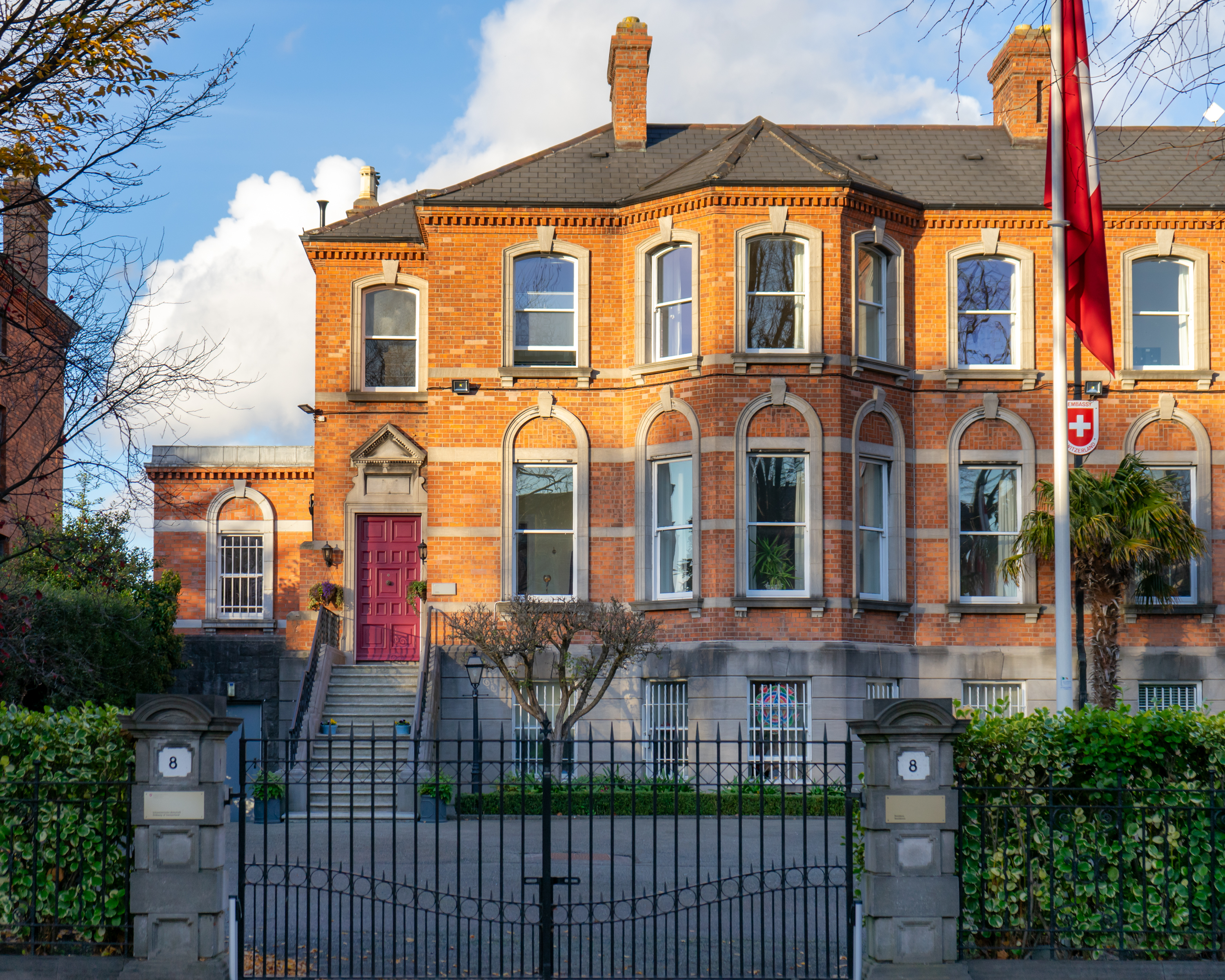
Embassy in Dublin

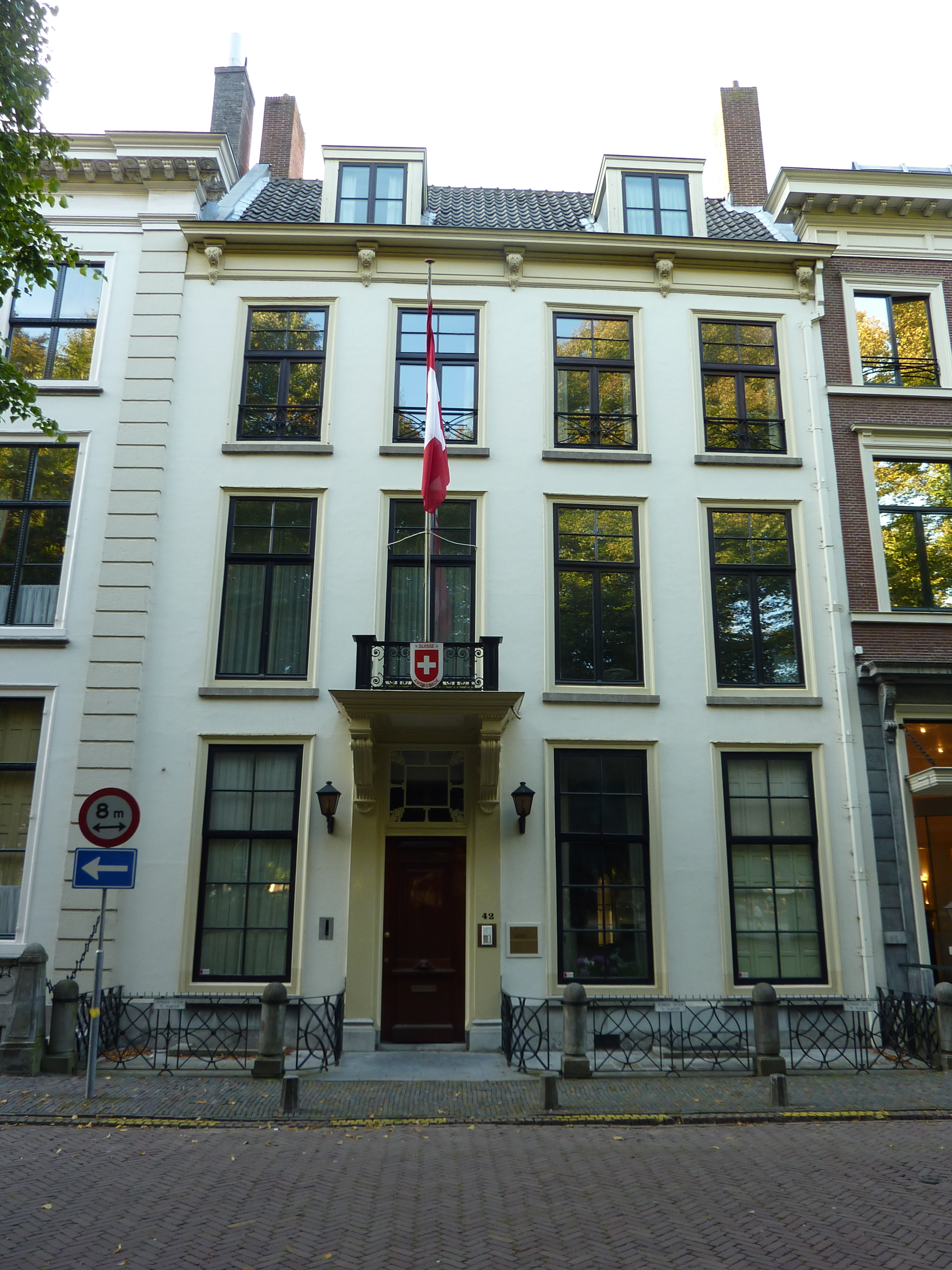
Embassy in The Hague

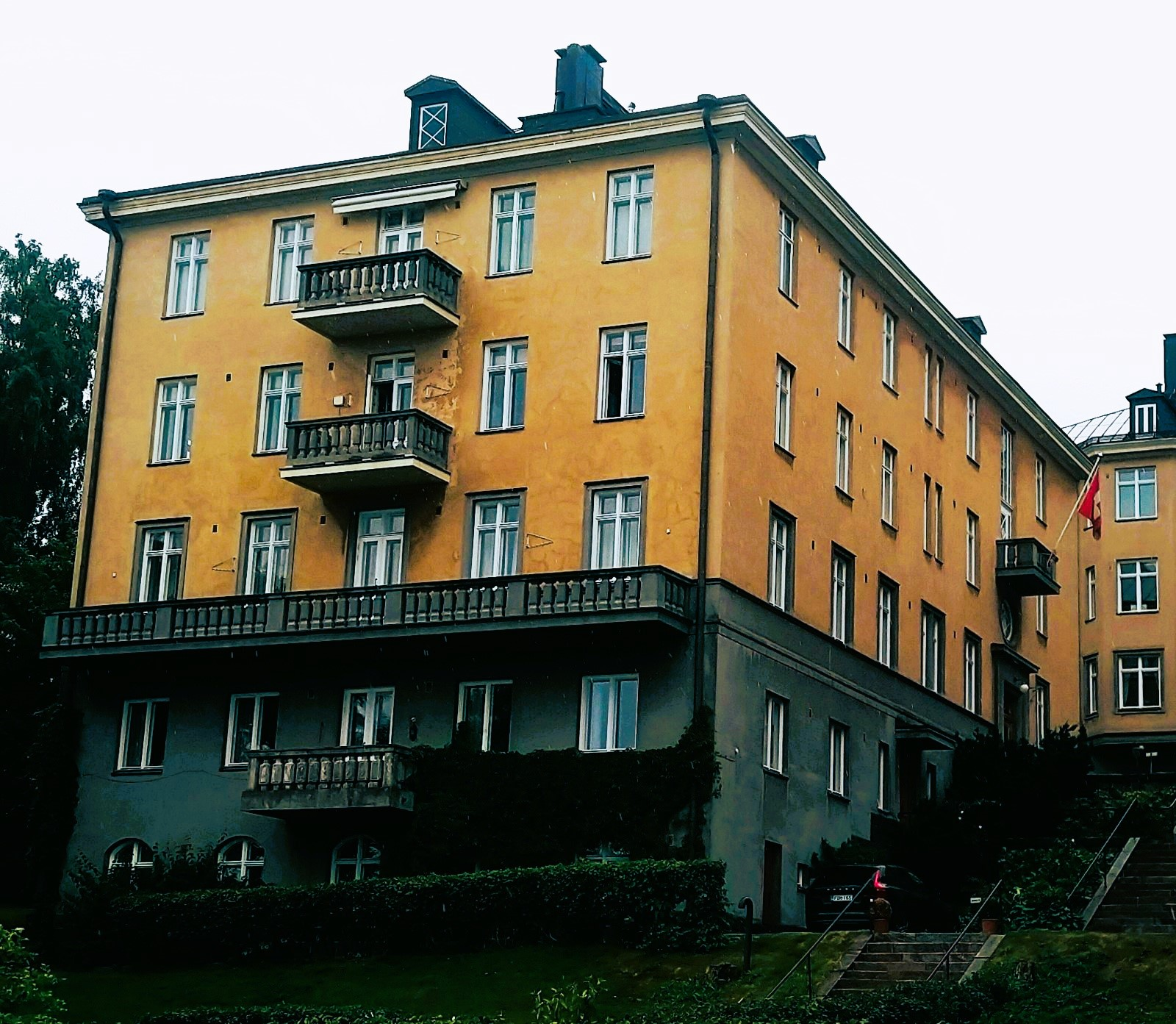
Embassy in Helsinki

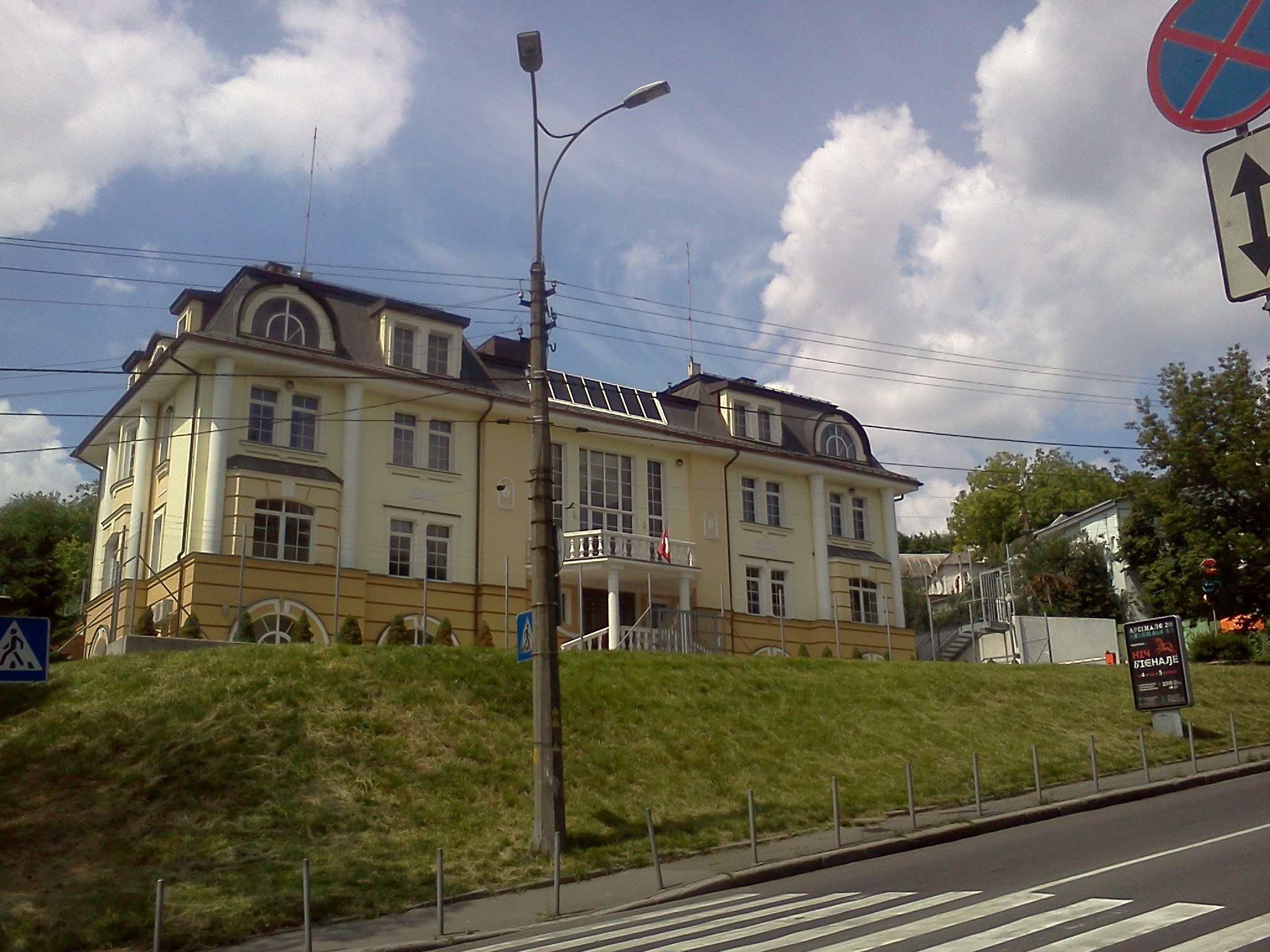
Embassy in Kyiv

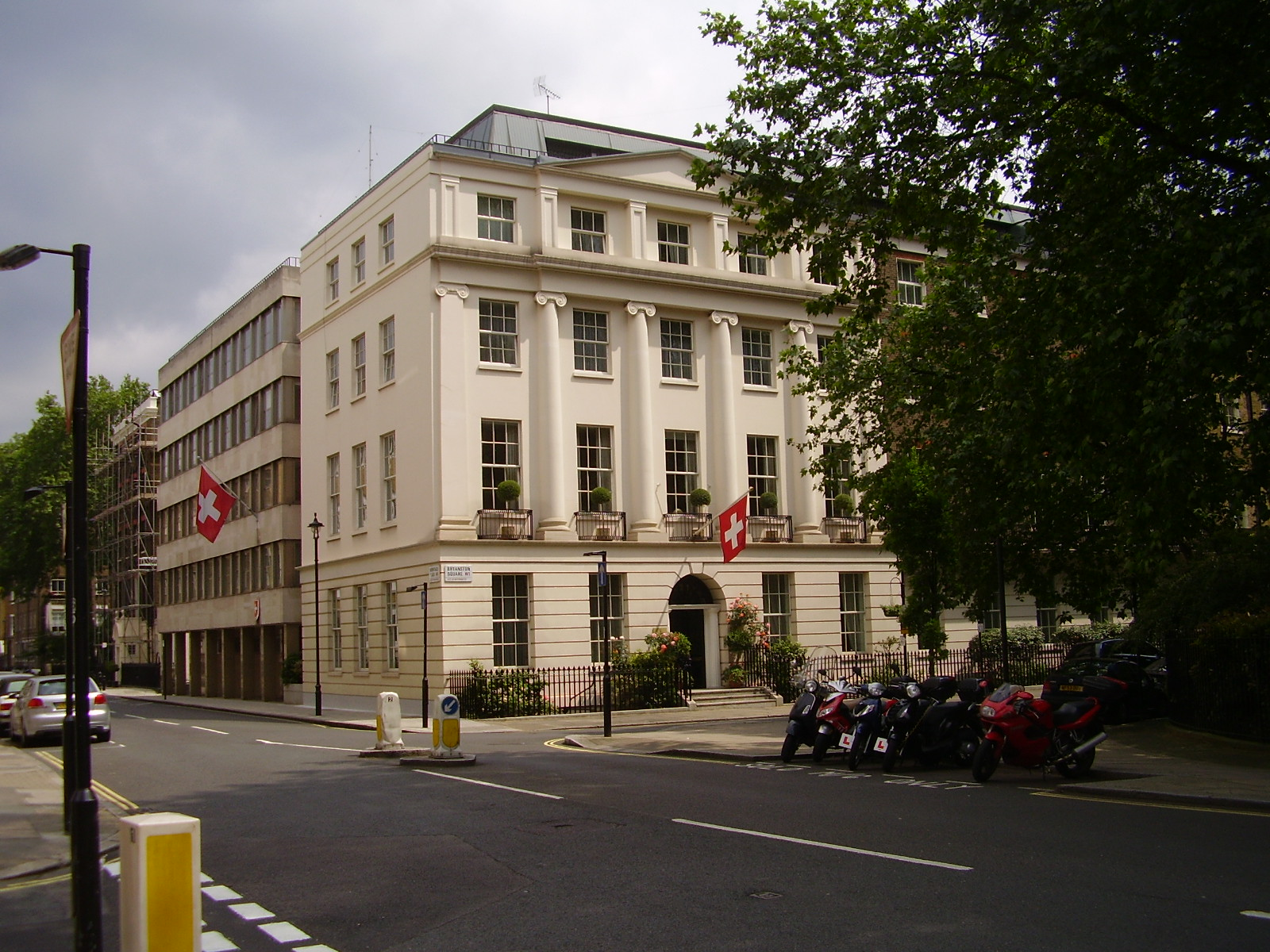
Embassy in London

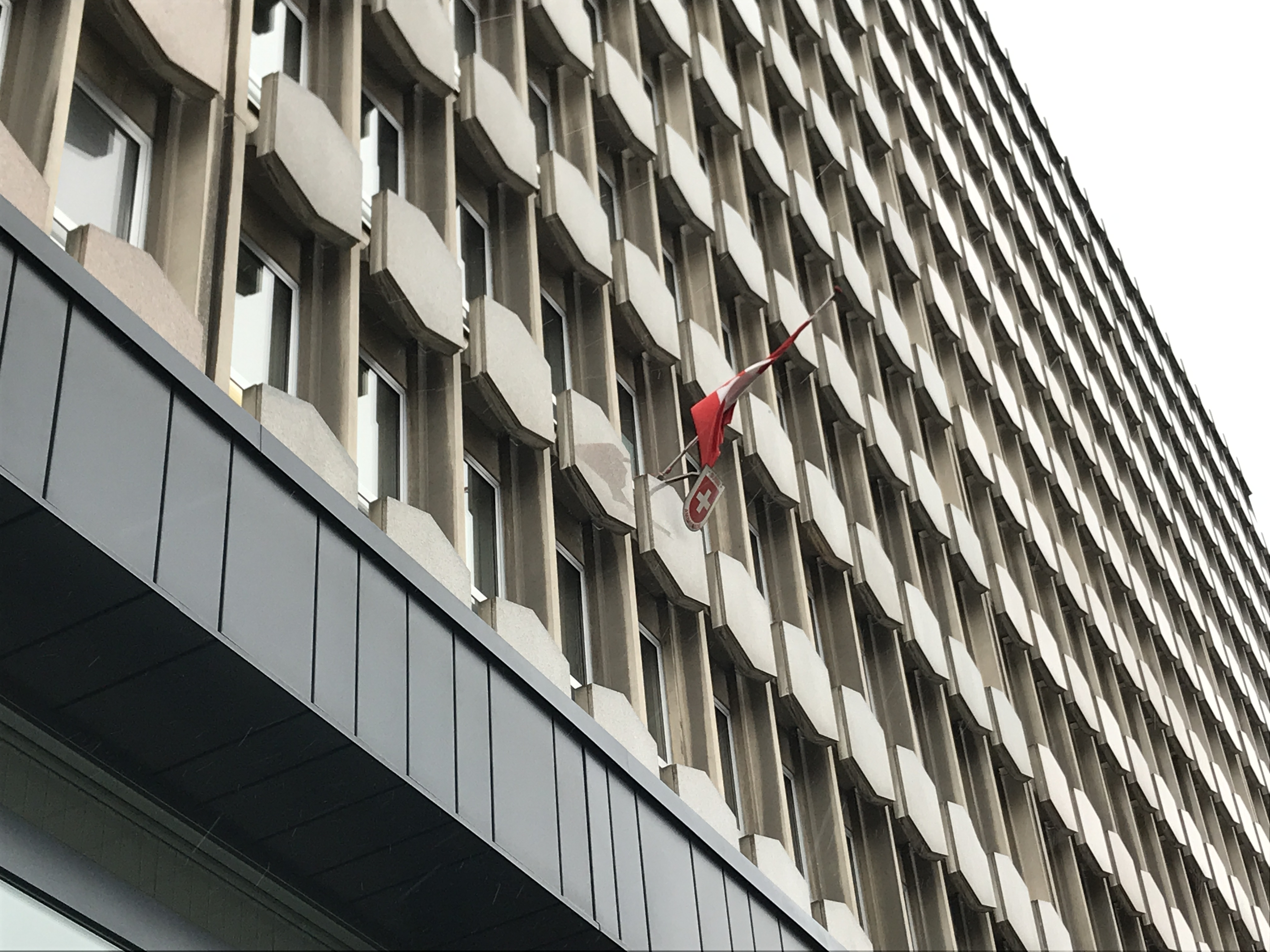
Embassy in Luxembourg City

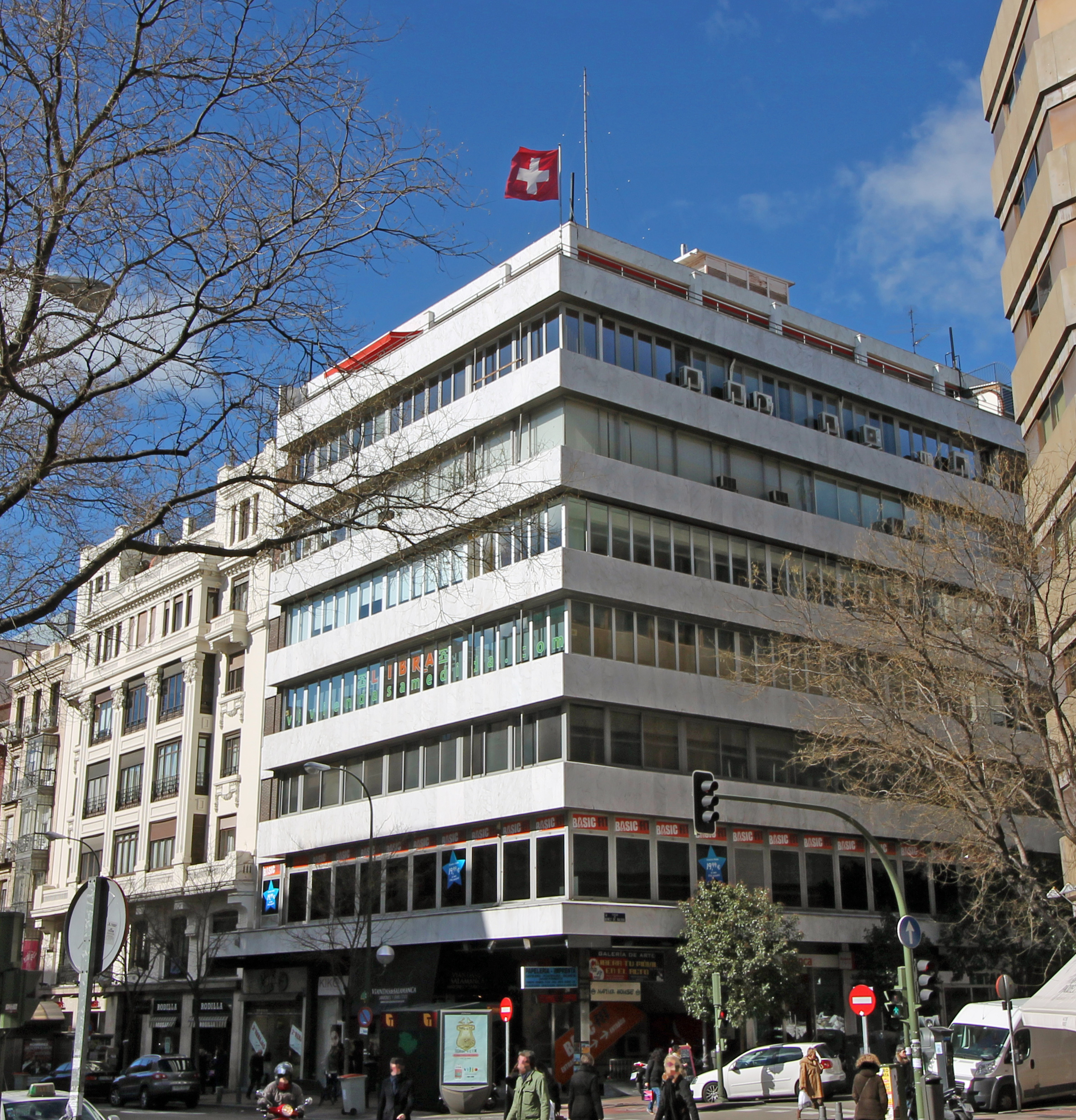
Embassy in Madrid

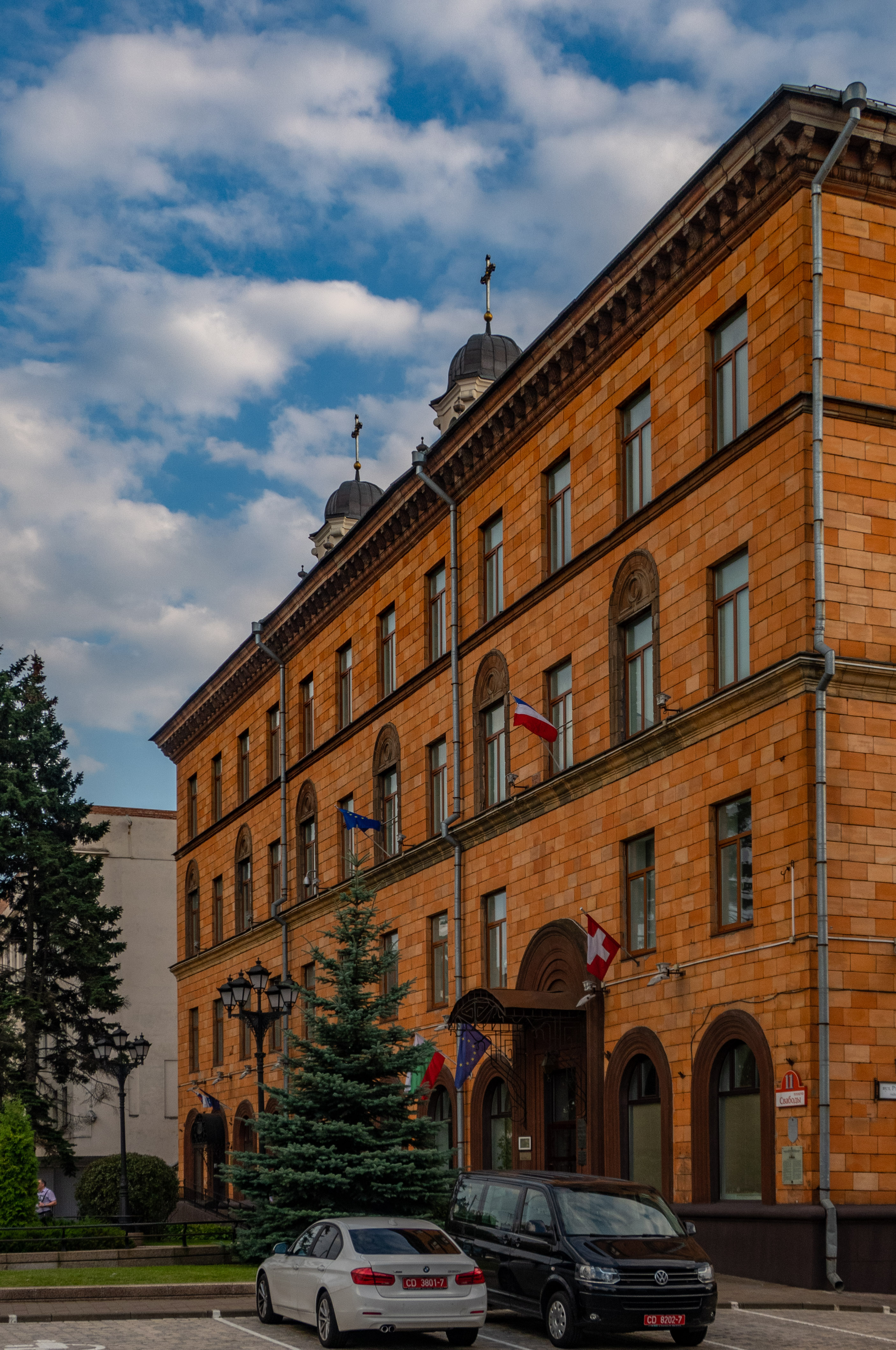
Embassy in Minsk

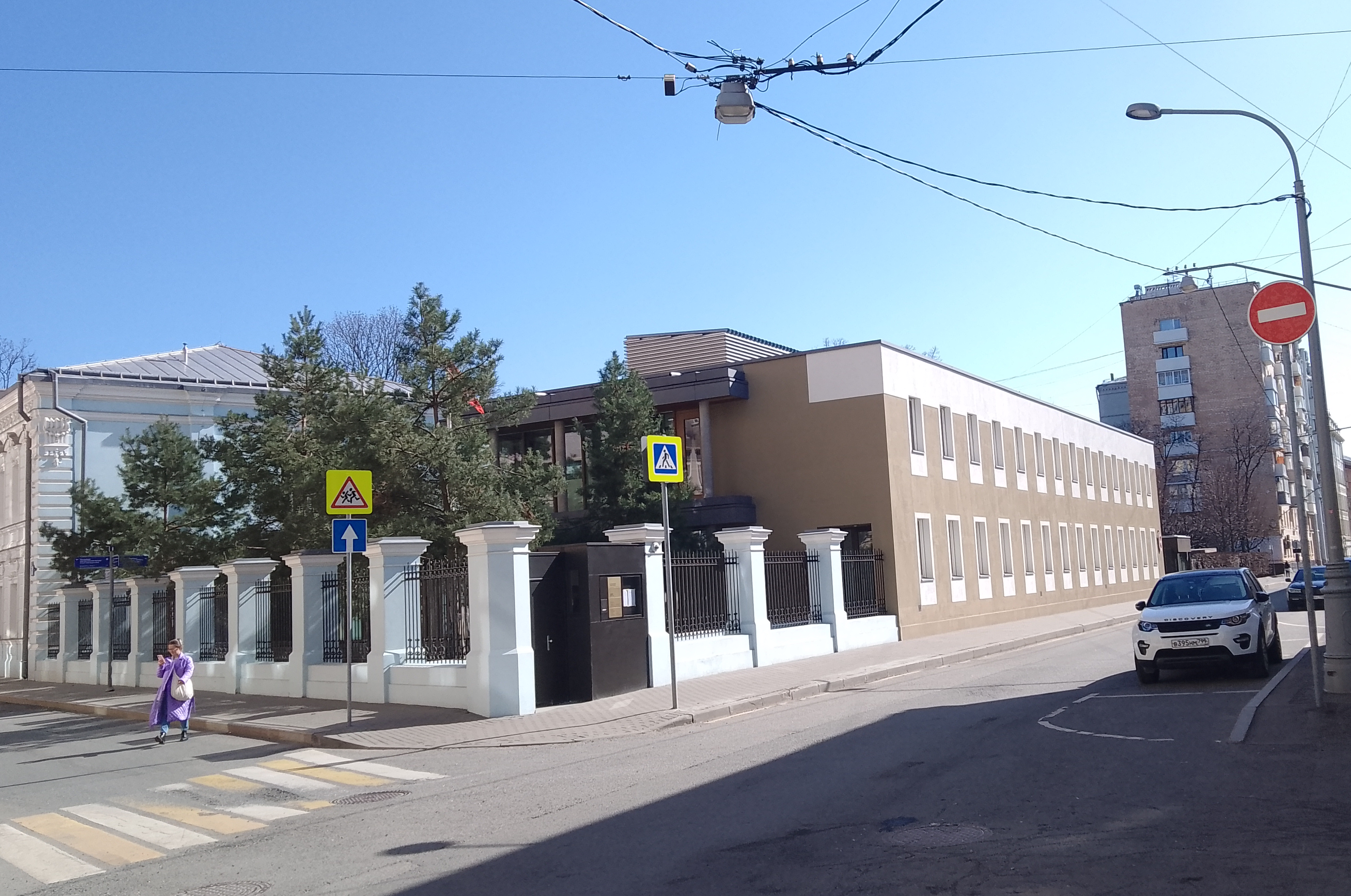
Embassy in Moscow

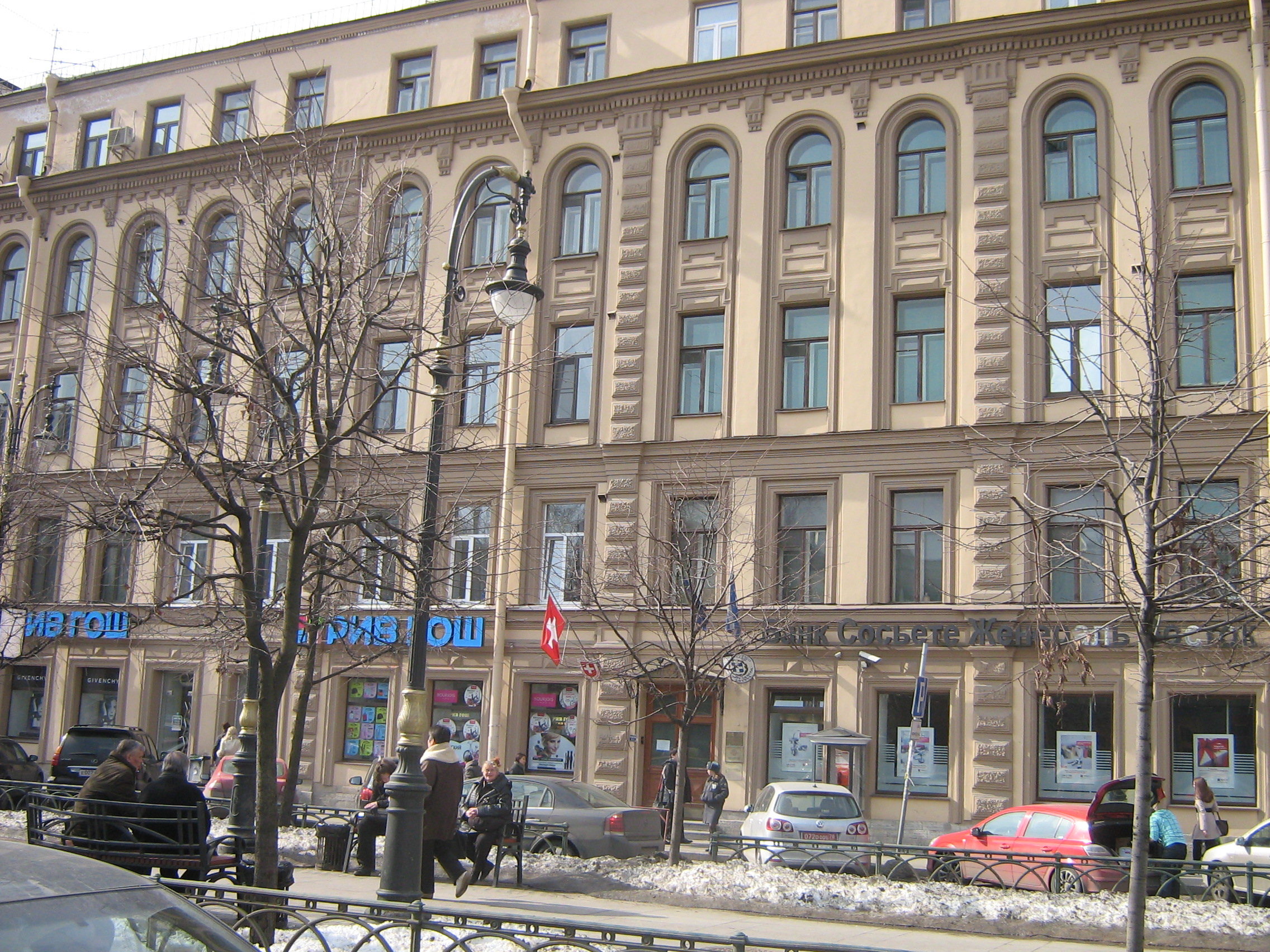
Consulate-General in Saint Petersburg

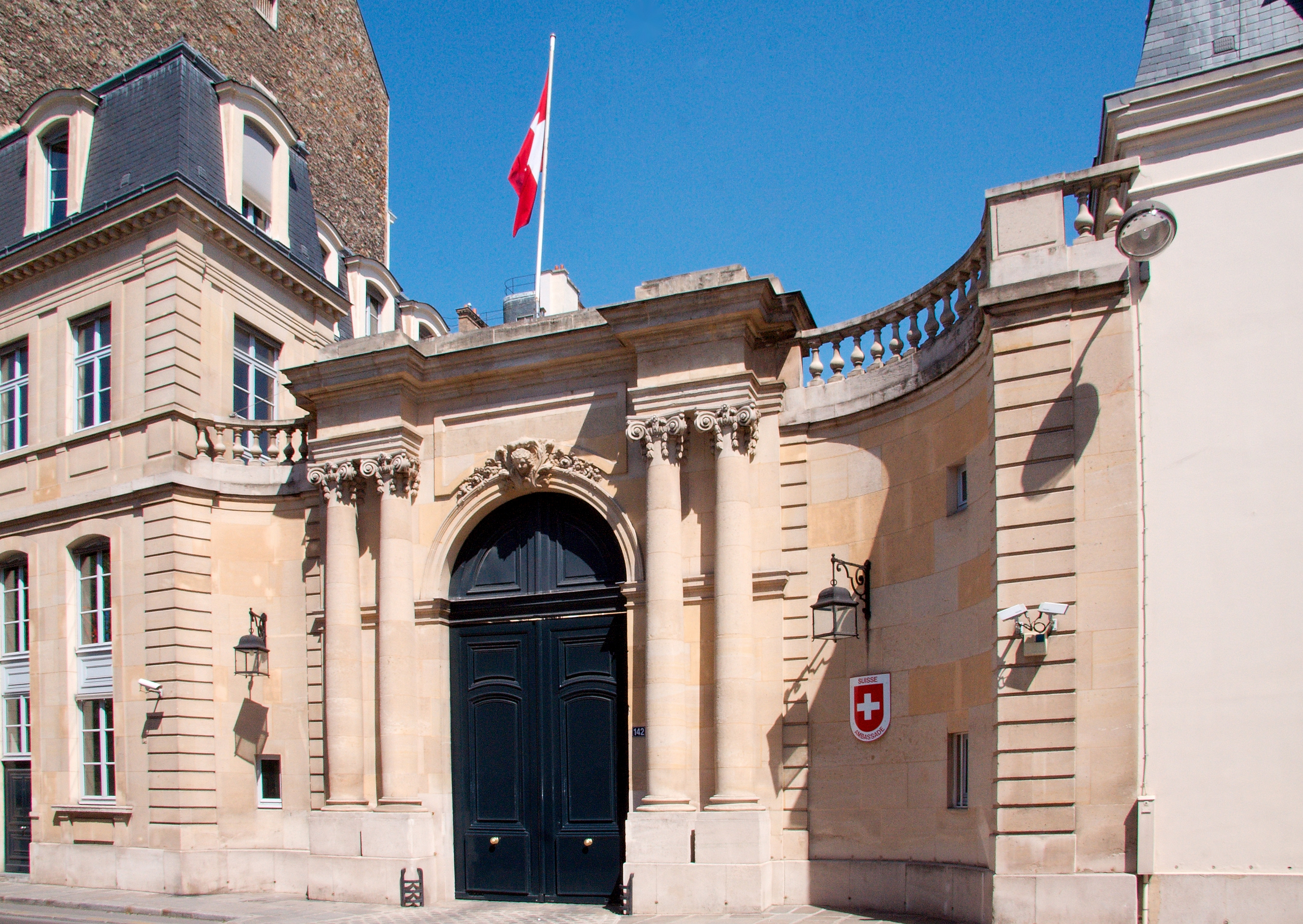
Embassy in Paris

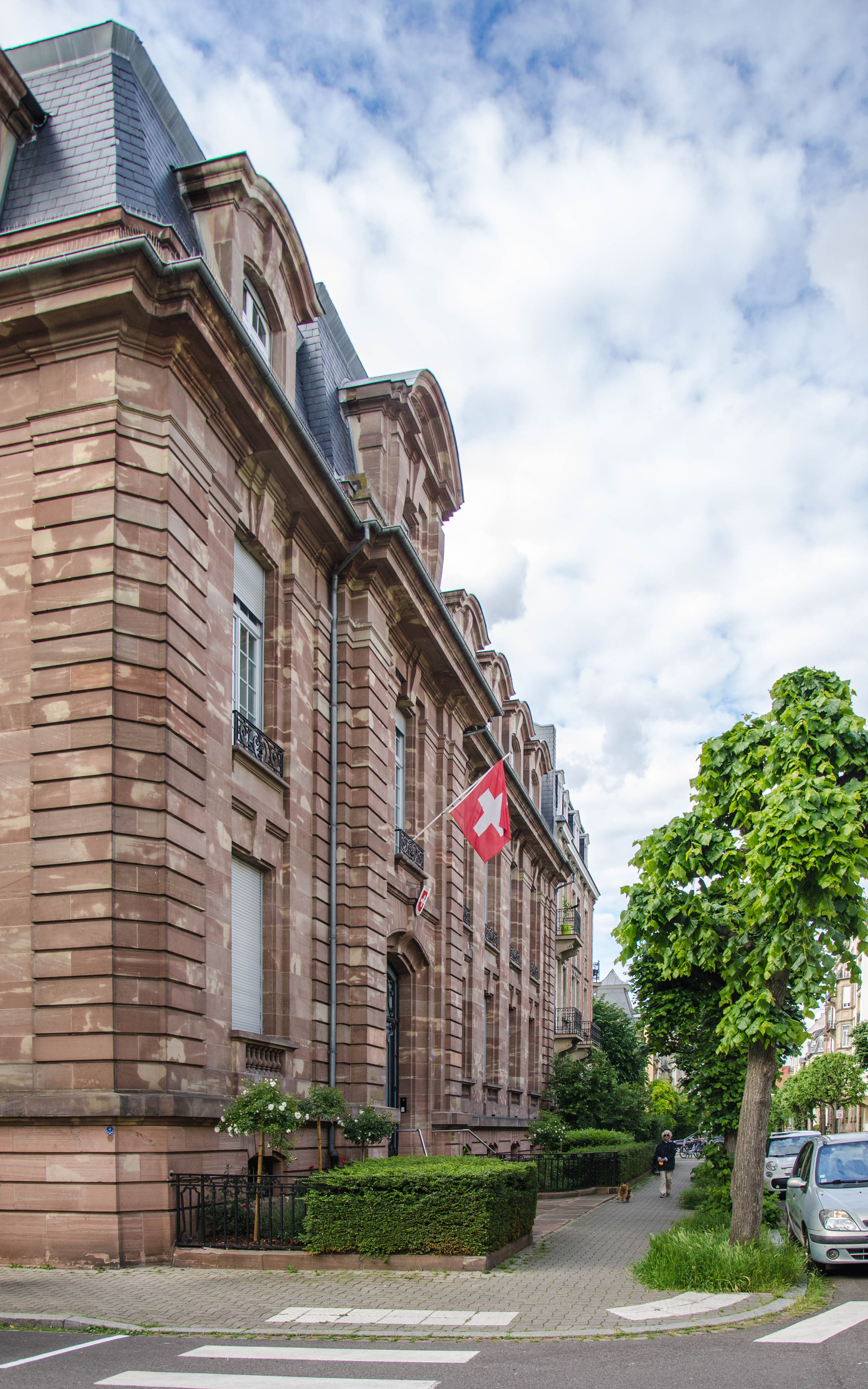
Consulate-General in Strasbourg

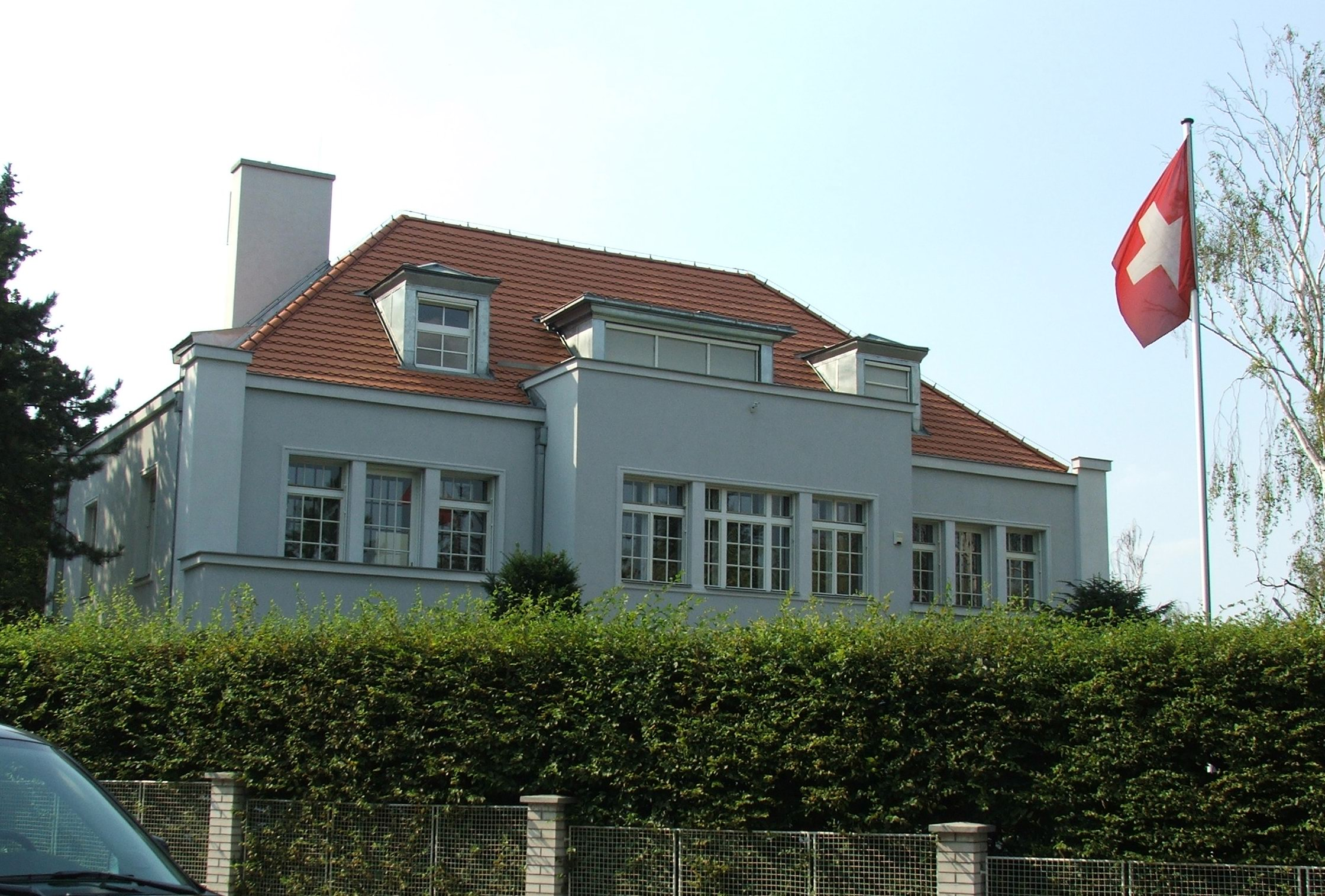
Embassy in Prague

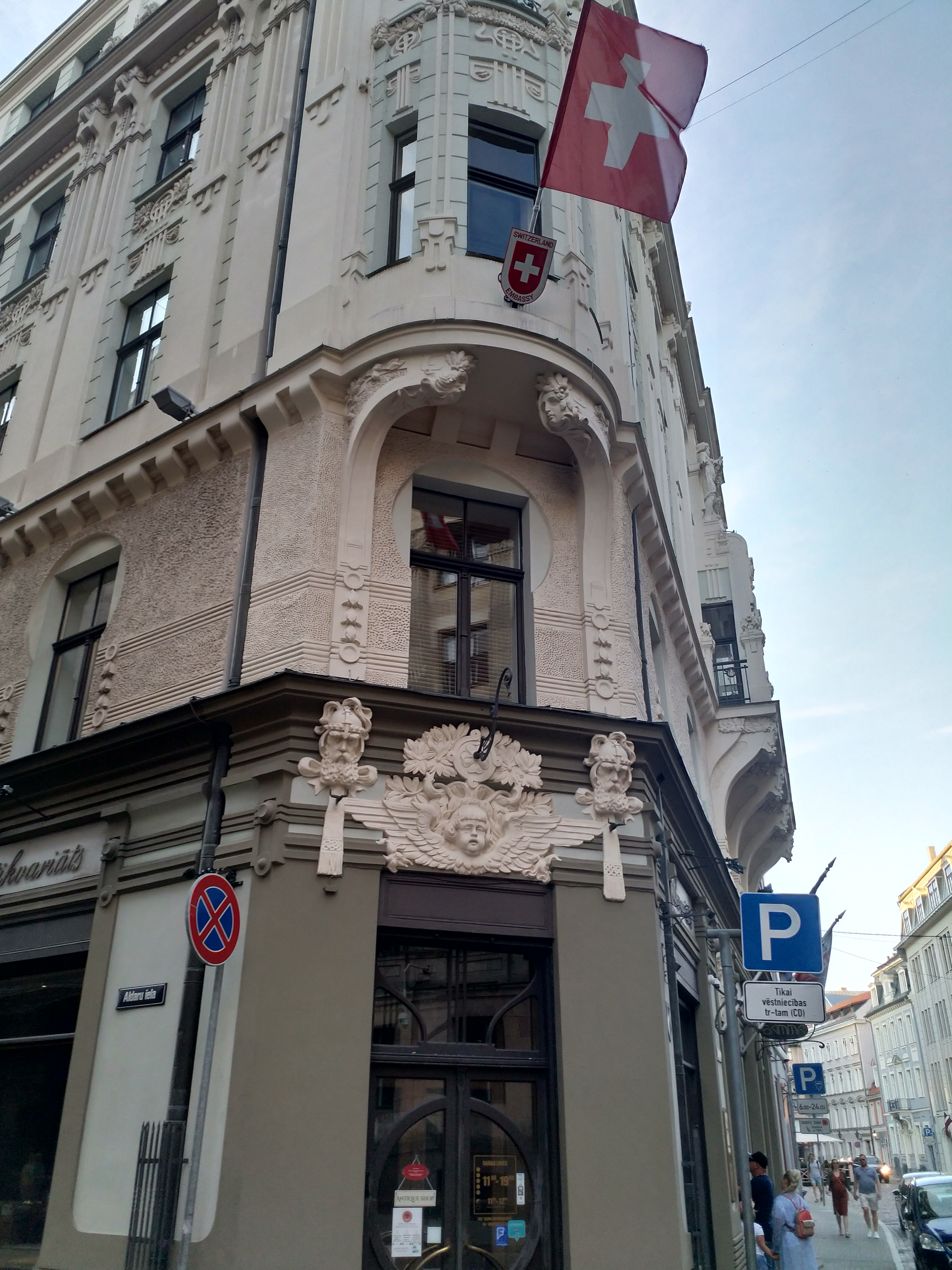
Embassy in Riga

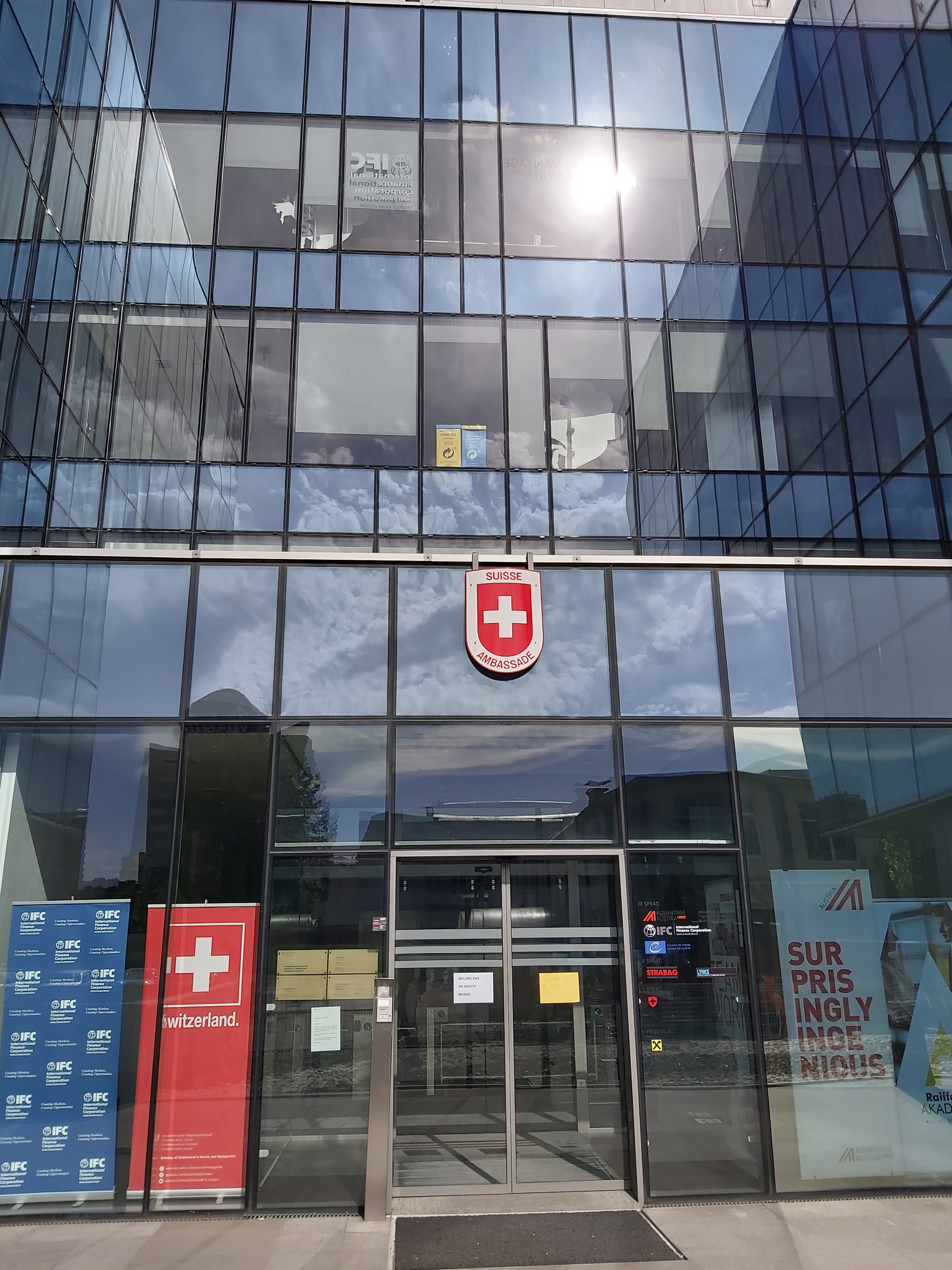
Embassy in Sarajevo

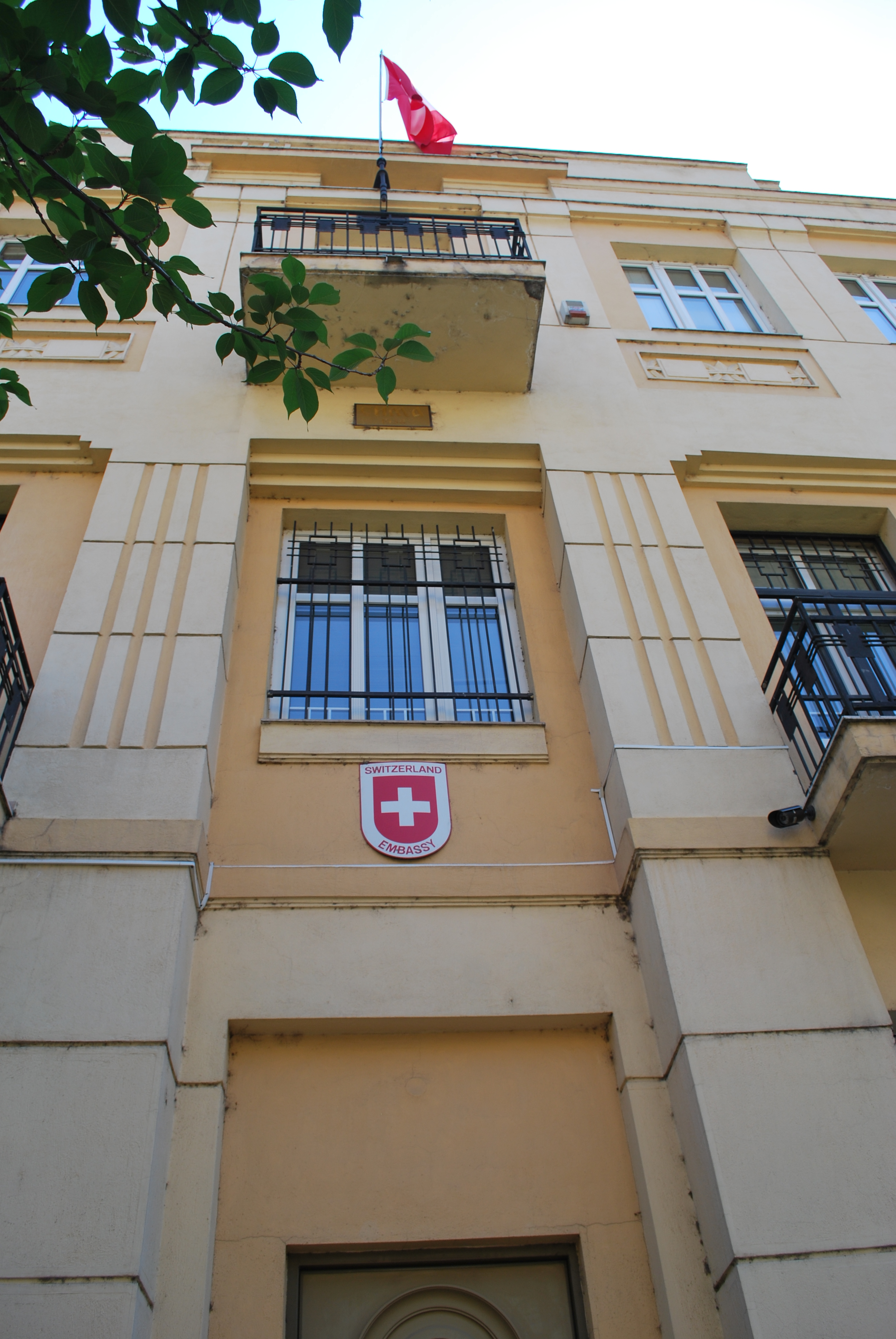
Embassy in Skopje

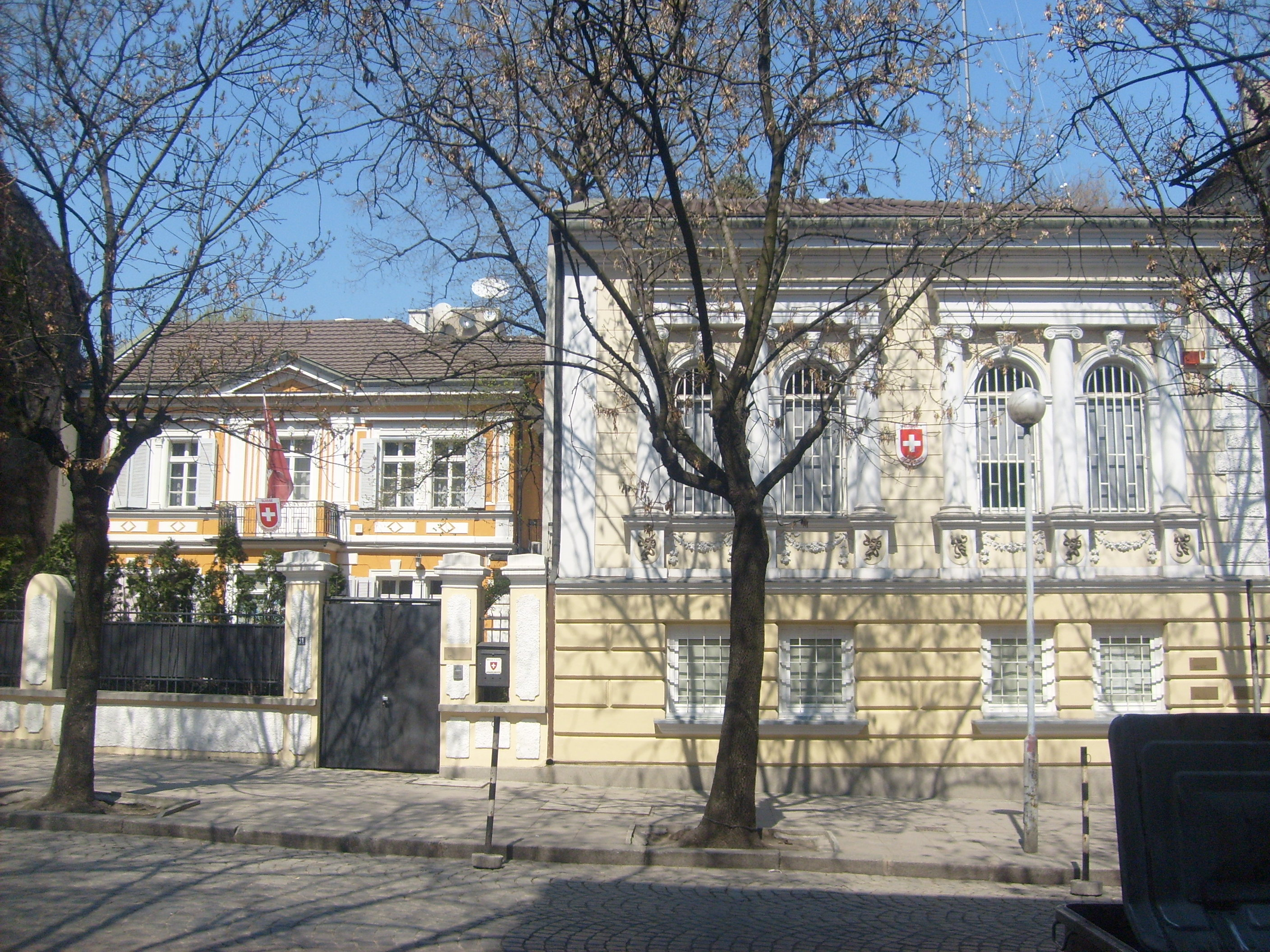
Embassy in Sofia

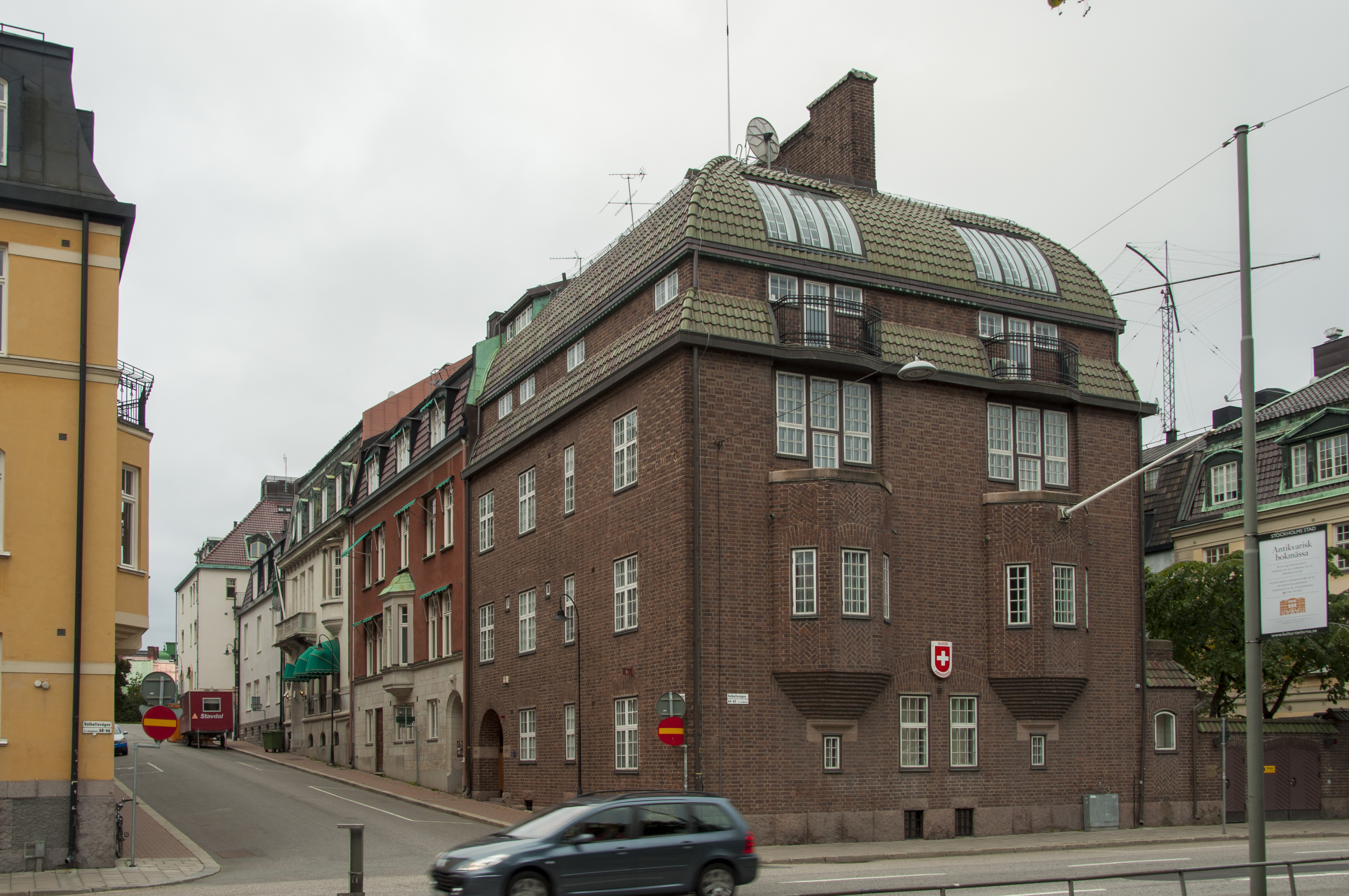
Embassy in Stockholm

Embassy in Tirana

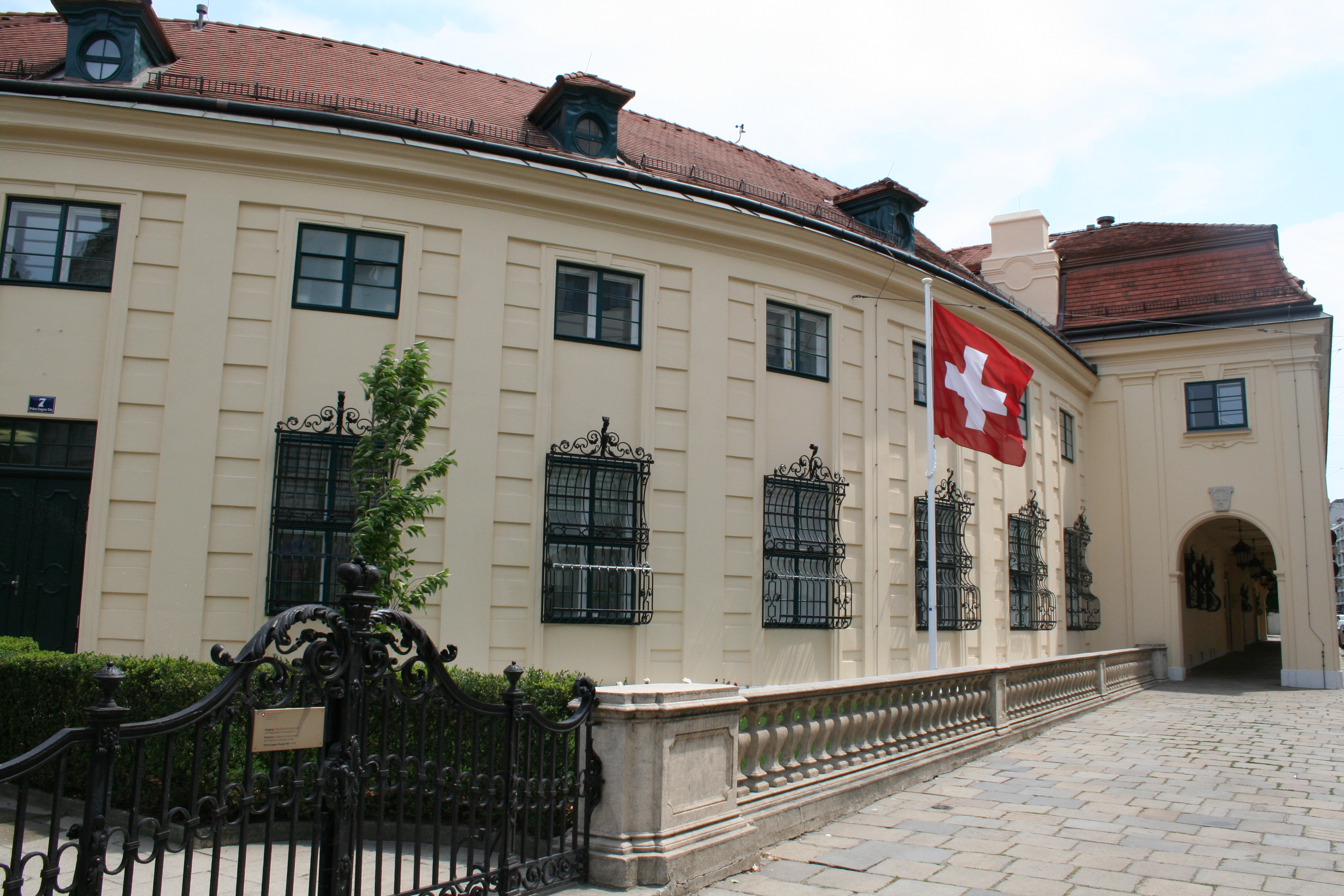
Embassy in Vienna

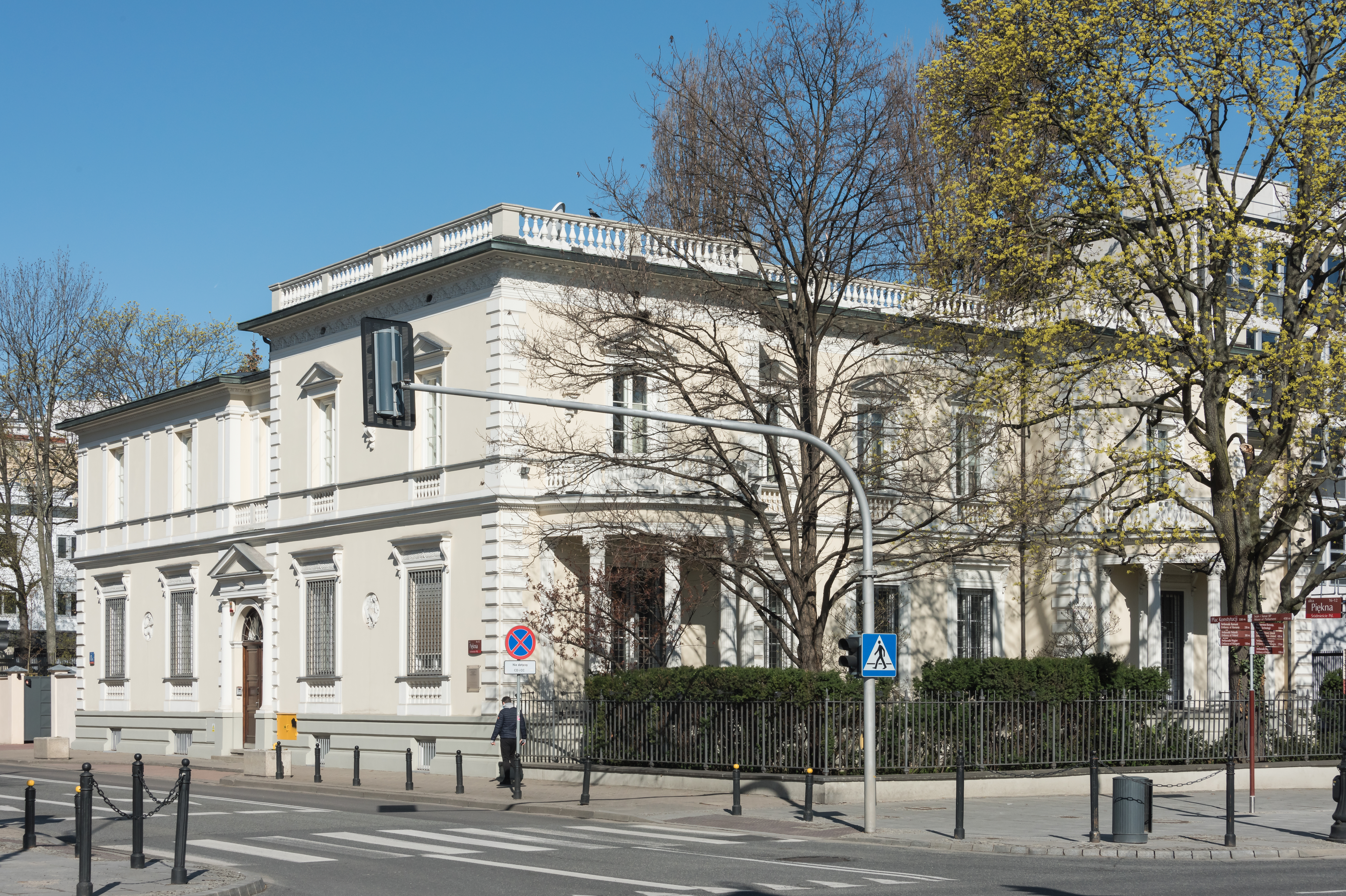
Embassy in Warsaw

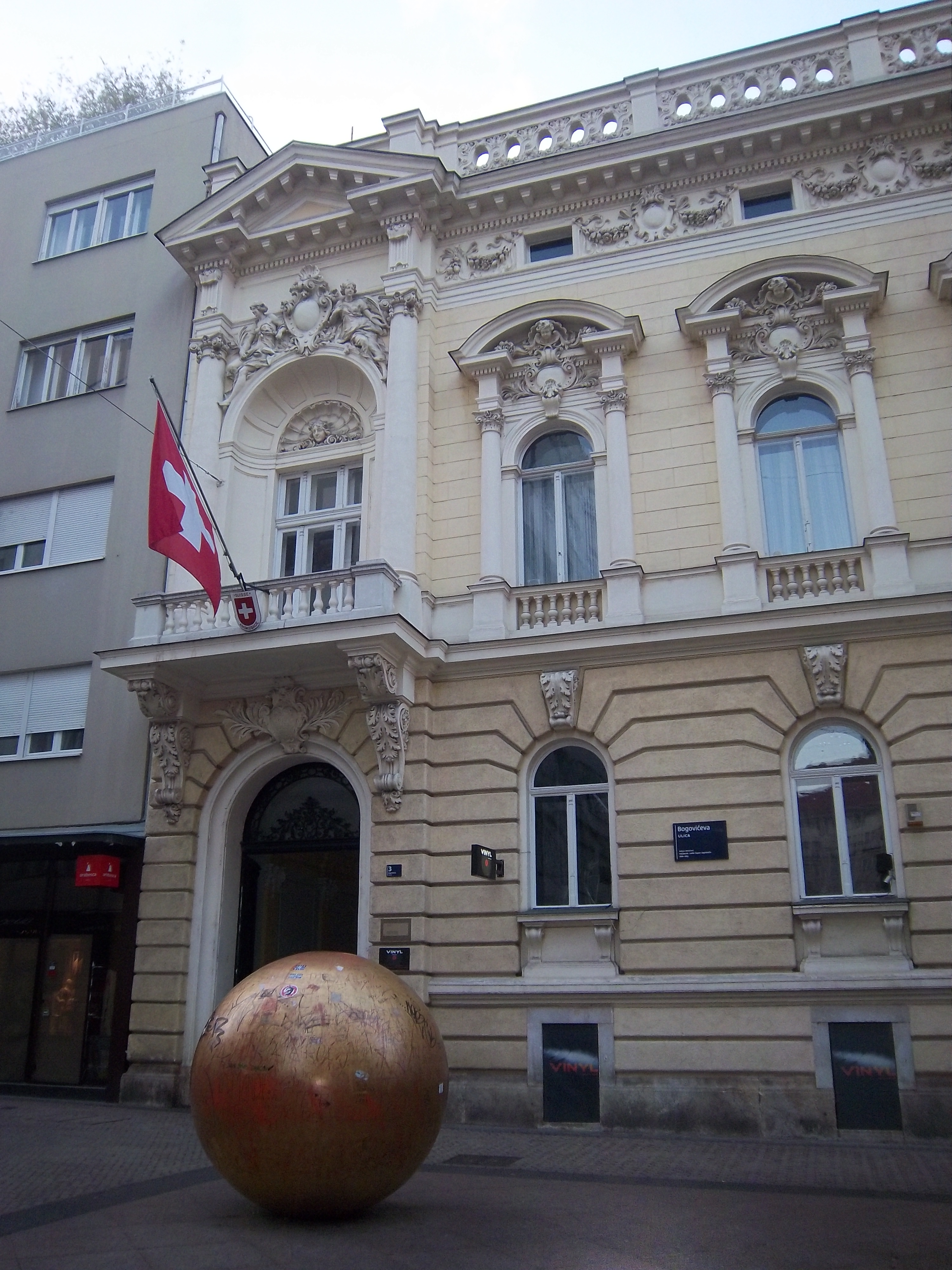
Embassy in Zagreb

=== Oceania ===
Host country	Host city	Mission	Concurrent accreditation	Ref.
Australia	Canberra	Embassy	Countries: Kiribati; Nauru; Papua New Guinea; Solomon Islands; Vanuatu	
Australia	Sydney	Consulate-General	Countries: Kiribati; Nauru; Papua New Guinea; Solomon Islands; Vanuatu	
New Zealand	Wellington	Embassy	Countries: Fiji; Samoa; Tonga; Tuvalu	

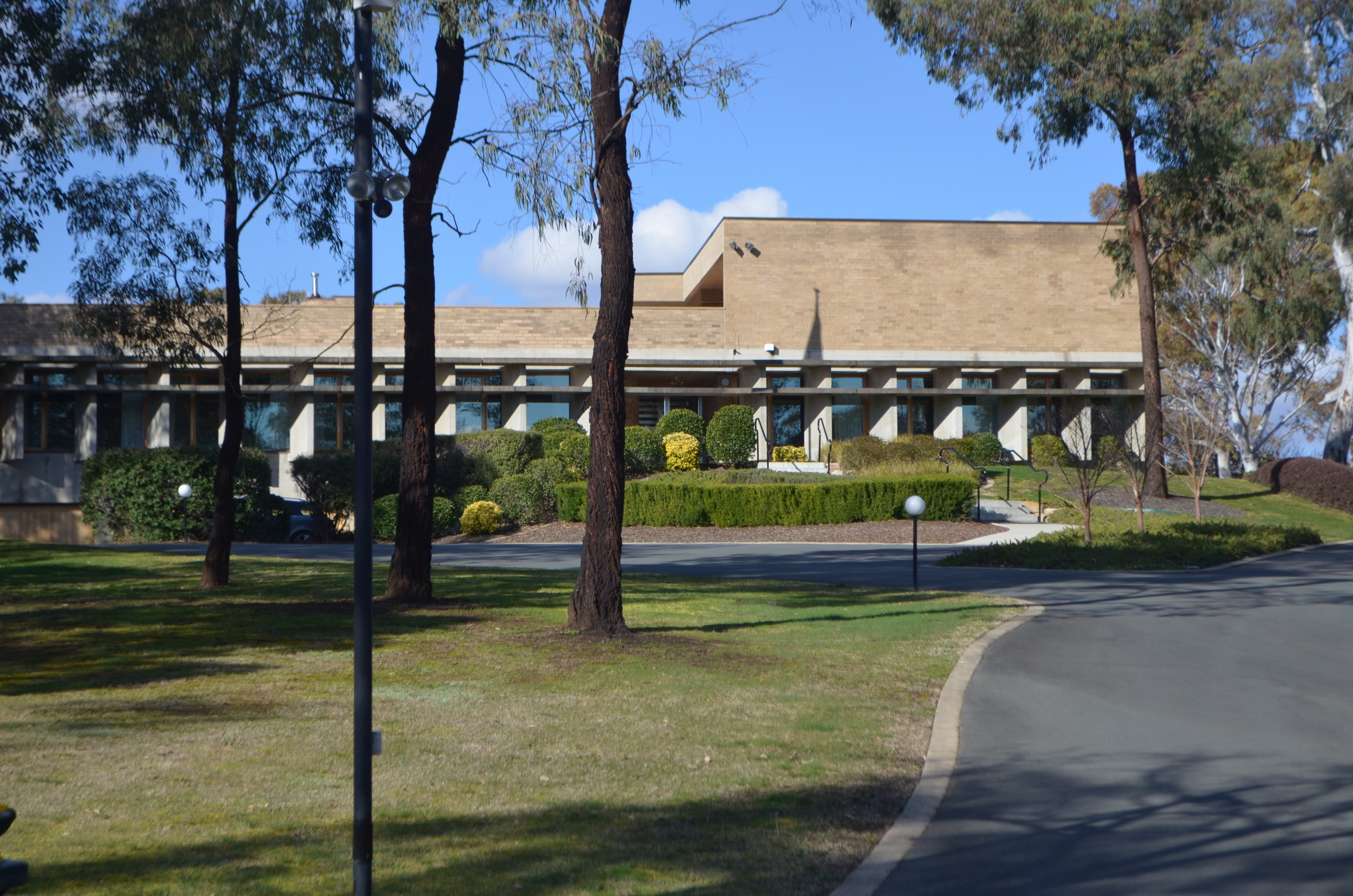
Embassy in Canberra

=== Multilateral organizations ===
Organization	Host city	Host country	Mission	Concurrent accreditation	Ref.
Council of Europe	Strasbourg	France	Permanent Representation		
European Union	Brussels	Belgium	Mission		
Food and Agriculture Organization	Rome	Italy	Permanent Representation	International Organizations: International Fund for Agricultural Development; World Food Programme	
NATO	Brussels	Belgium	Permanent Representation		
OECD	Paris	France	Permanent Delegation		
OSCE	Vienna	Austria	Delegation		
United Nations	New York City	United States	Permanent Mission		
United Nations	Geneva	Switzerland	Permanent Mission	International Organizations: Conference on Disarmament; International Organization for Migration; World Health Organization; World Meteorological Organization	
United Nations	Vienna	Austria	Permanent Mission	International Organizations: United Nations Industrial Development Organization (UNIDO); United Nations Office for Outer Space Affairs (UNOOSA); United Nations Office on Drugs and Crime (UNODC)	
UNESCO	Paris	France	Permanent Delegation		
World Trade Organization	Geneva	Switzerland	Permanent Mission	International Organizations: European Free Trade Association	

== Closed missions ==
=== Africa ===
Host country	Host city	Mission	Year closed	Ref.
Guinea	Conakry	Embassy	1992	
Libya	Tripoli	Embassy	2014	
Liberia	Monrovia	Embassy	1992	
Liberia	Monrovia	Cooperation office & consular agency	2016	
Morocco	Tangier	Consulate	1968	
Namibia	Windhoek	Consulate-General	1996	
Sudan	Khartoum	Embassy	2023	

=== Americas ===
Host country	Host city	Mission	Year closed	Ref.
El Salvador	San Salvador	Embassy	1979	
Panama	Panama City	Embassy	1995	
Paraguay	Asunción	Embassy	2016	
United States	Houston	Consulate-General	2006	
United States	Los Angeles	Consulate-General	2018	

=== Asia ===
Host country	Host city	Mission	Year closed	Ref.
Afghanistan	Kabul	Cooperation office & consular agency	2021	
Mongolia	Ulaanbaatar	Cooperation office & consular agency	2024	
Pakistan	Karachi	Consulate-General	2018	
Syria	Damascus	Embassy	2012	

=== Europe ===
Host country	Host city	Mission	Year closed	Ref.
East Germany	East Berlin	Embassy	1990	
France	Bordeaux	Consulate-General	2008	
France	Dijon	Consulate	1995	
Germany	Hamburg	Consulate-General	2009	
Italy	Genoa	Consulate-General	2011	
Italy	Naples	Consulate-General	2007	
Netherlands	Amsterdam	Consulate-General	2005	
Spain	Málaga	Consulate	1998	
Spain	Las Palmas de Gran Canaria	Consulate	2012	
United Kingdom	Edinburgh	Consulate-General	2011	

== See also ==
- Foreign relations of Switzerland
- List of diplomatic missions in Switzerland
- Protecting power
