= Foreign relations of Switzerland =

The foreign relations of Switzerland are the primary responsibility of the Federal Department of Foreign Affairs (FDFA). Some international relations of Switzerland are handled by other departments of the federal administration of Switzerland.

== History ==
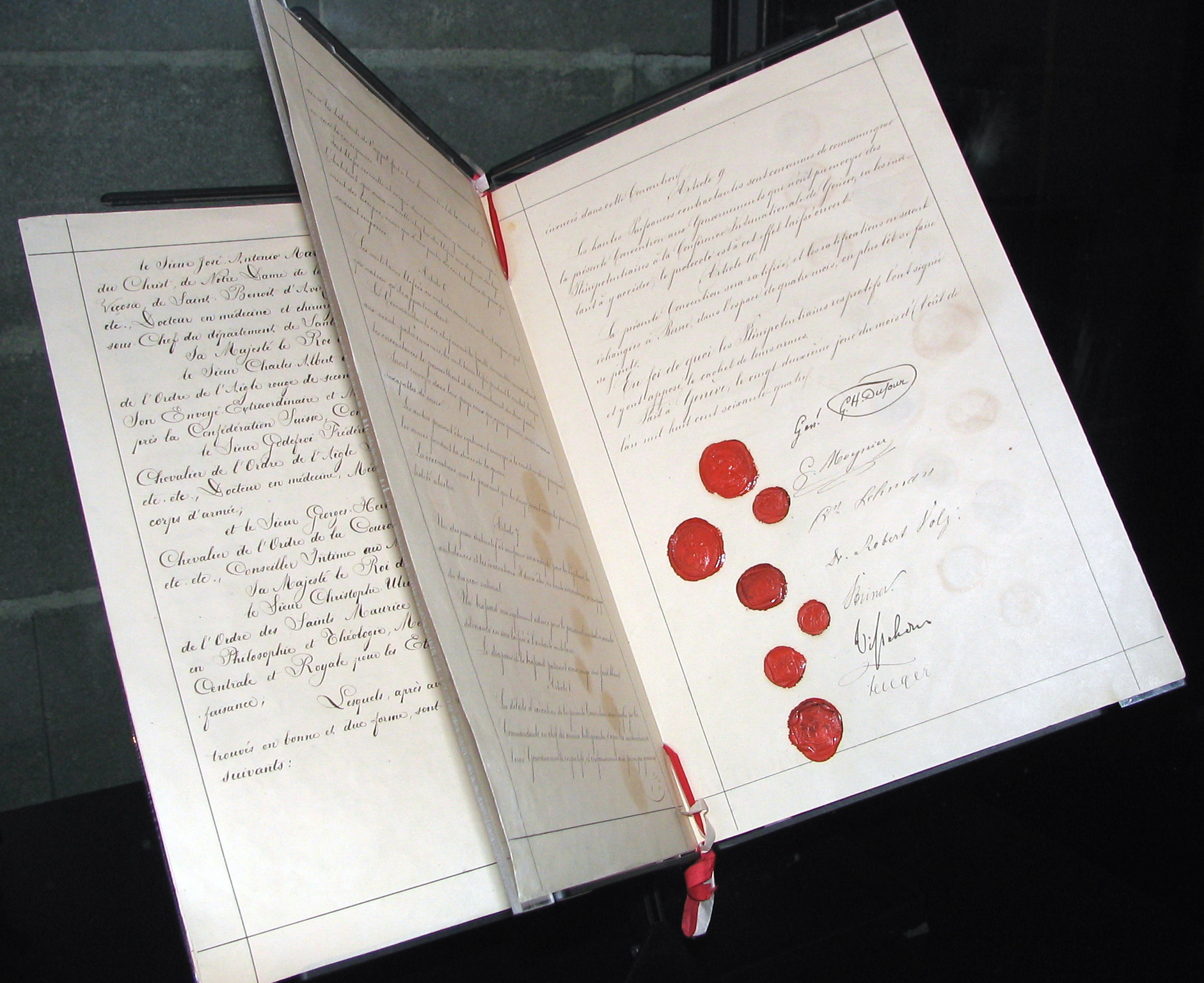
The First Geneva Convention (1864). Geneva is the city that hosts the highest number of international organisations in the world.

Article 54 of the Swiss Constitution of 1999 declares the safeguarding of Switzerland's independence and welfare as the principal objective of Swiss foreign policy. Below this overarching goal, the Constitution specifies these foreign policy objectives:

- alleviate need and poverty in the world;
- promote respect for human rights and democracy;
- promote the peaceful coexistence of peoples;
- promote preservation of natural resources.

These objectives reflect the Swiss moral obligation to undertake social, economic, and humanitarian activities that contribute to world peace and prosperity. This is manifested by Swiss bilateral and multilateral diplomatic activity, assistance to developing countries, and support for the extension of international law, particularly humanitarian law.

Traditionally, Switzerland has avoided alliances that might entail military, political, or direct economic action. Only in recent years have the Swiss broadened the scope of activities in which they feel able to participate without compromising their neutrality. Switzerland is not a member of the European Union and joined the United Nations very late compared to its European neighbours.

Switzerland maintains diplomatic relations with almost all countries and historically has served as a neutral intermediary and host to major international treaty conferences. The country has no major dispute in its bilateral relations.

Switzerland (mainly Geneva) is home to many international governmental and nongovernmental organisations, including the International Olympic Committee, the International Committee of the Red Cross and the European Broadcasting Union. One of the first international organisations, the Universal Postal Union, is located in Bern.

=== United Nations ===
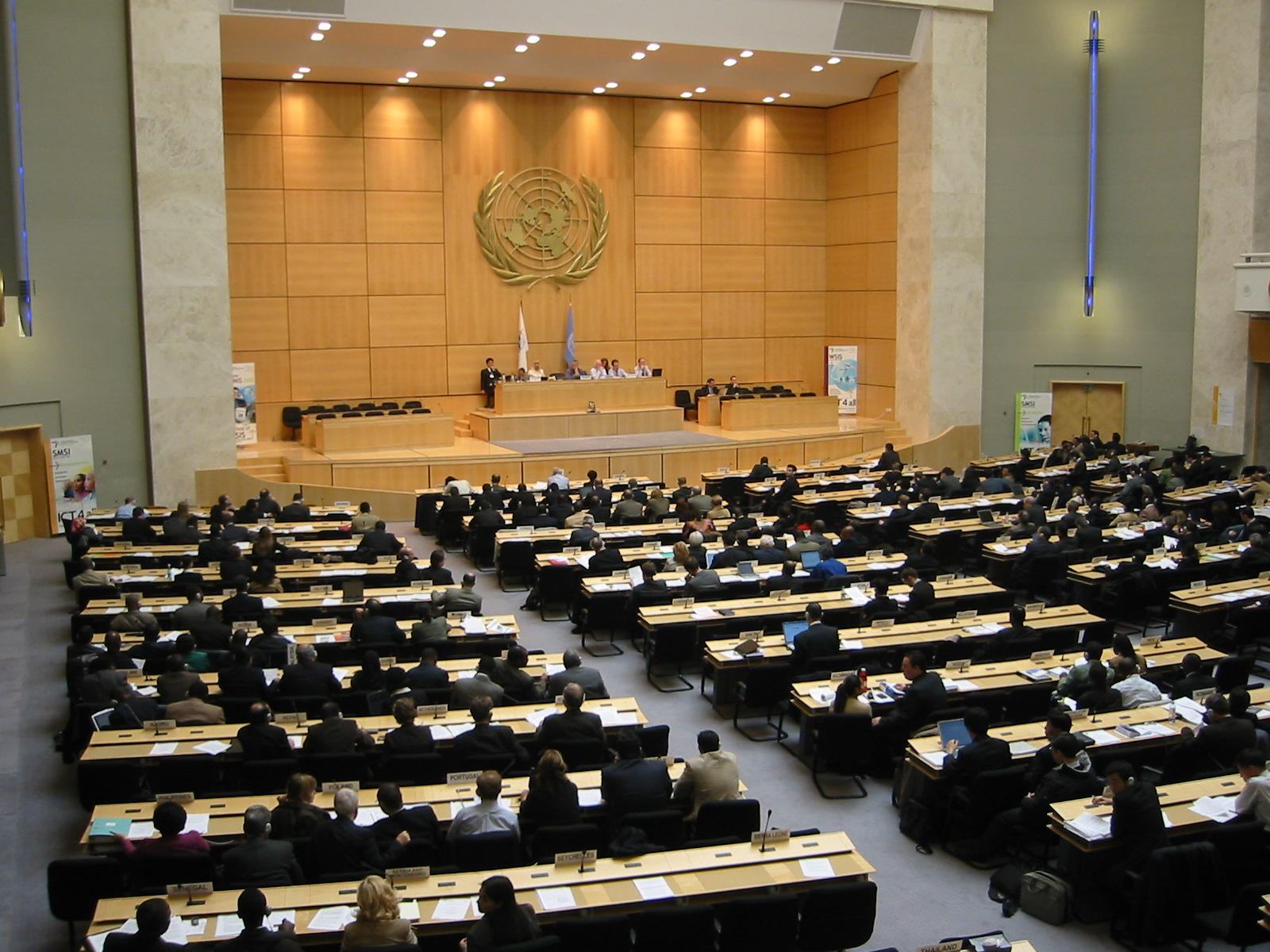
Session in the Palace of Nations in Geneva

Switzerland, fearing that its status as a neutral country would be damaged, did not join the United Nations when it was created in 1945. On 10 September 2002, Switzerland became a full member of the United Nations, after a referendum supporting full membership won in a close vote six months earlier; Swiss voters had rejected membership by a 3-to-1 margin in 1986. The 2002 vote made Switzerland the first and only country to join based on a popular vote. Conversely, on 17 May 1992, Swiss voters approved by a healthy margin (55 percent in favour) the decision to join the IMF and the World Bank. Less than two weeks later, but a full two years after the initial application, Switzerland finally became a member of the IMF on 29 May of that same year.

Prior to its formal accession to the United Nations, Switzerland had maintained an observer role at the UN's General Assembly and its Economic and Social Council. Prior to full membership it had no right to a seat as one of the elected members of the UN Security Council. Switzerland was elected as a member of the United Nations Security Council for the period 2023–2024 on 9 June 2022. Switzerland says it intends to play its role as a "bridge builder". Other stated priorities are peace building, supporting women into the political process, minorities rights and human rights and more transparency from the Security Council.

Switzerland has fully participated within many of the UN's specialised institutions, including the Economic Commission for Europe, United Nations Environment Programme, the UN High Commissioner for Refugees, UN Educational, Scientific and Cultural Organization, UN Conference on Trade and Development, UN Industrial Development Organization, and the Universal Postal Union. Switzerland has also furnished military observers and medical teams to several UN operations.

Switzerland is a party to the Statute of the International Court of Justice.

==== Support of UN sanctions ====
The Swiss government on 25 June 2003, eased most of the sanctions against the Republic of Iraq in accord with UN Security Council Resolution (UNSCR) 1483. The government lifted the trade embargo, flight restrictions, and financial sanctions in place since August 1990. The weapons embargo and the asset freeze, the scope of which was extended, remain in force, and restrictions on the trade in Iraqi cultural goods were newly imposed. Though not a member at the time, Switzerland had joined UN sanctions against Iraq after the invasion of Kuwait.

Switzerland also has joined UN economic sanctions imposed on Libya, Sierra Leone, UNITA (Angola), Liberia, and Serbia/Montenegro. On 15 October 2003, the Federal Council ended the import restrictions on raw diamonds from Sierra Leone and lifted sanctions against Libya.

Switzerland in October 2000 implemented an ordinance to enforce UN sanctions against the Taliban (UNSCR 1267), which it subsequently amended in April 2001 in accord with tighter UN regulations (UNSCR 1333). On 2 May 2002, the Swiss Government eased the sanctions regime in accord with UNSCR 1388 and 1390, lifting the ban on the sale of acetic acid (used in drug production), Afghan airlines, and Afghan diplomatic representations. The weapons embargo, travel restrictions, and financial sanctions remain in force.

The Swiss Government in November 2001 issued an ordinance declaring illegal the terrorist organisation Al-Qaeda as well as possible successor or supporting organisations. More than 200 individuals or companies linked to international terrorism have been blacklisted to have their assets frozen. Thus far, Swiss authorities have blocked about 72 accounts totalling U.S.$22.6 million.

Switzerland is a member of many international organizations, including the World Trade Organization, Organisation for Economic Co-operation and Development, European Free Trade Association, Council of Europe, Organization for Security and Cooperation in Europe, International Atomic Energy Agency, and International Telecommunications Satellite Organization. Its central bank is a member of the Bank for International Settlements, based in Basel.

Switzerland is an active participant in the Organization for Security and Co-operation in Europe, its foreign minister serving as Chairman-in-Office for 1996. Switzerland also is an active participant in the major nonproliferation and export control regimes.

Although it is surrounded by member nations, Switzerland is not a member nation of the European Union. In 1992 Swiss voters approved membership in the International Monetary Fund and the World Bank, but later that year rejected the European Economic Area agreement, which the government viewed as a first step toward European Union membership. The Swiss instead take part in the European single market and Schengen through bilateral treaties.

=== Participation in peacekeeping ===
While the Swiss electorate did reject a government proposition to directly deploy Swiss troops as UN peacekeepers (the Blue Helmets) in 1994, a total of 23 Swiss personnel including police and military observers (the Blue Berets) have served or are now serving for the United Nations. These dispositions are impartial, clearly defined and cover a number of UN projects around the globe.

In 1996 Switzerland joined NATO's Partnership for Peace, the Euro-Atlantic Partnership Council in 1997, and deployed Yellow Berets to support the OSCE in Bosnia. In June 2001, Swiss voters approved new legislation providing for the deployment of armed Swiss troops for international peacekeeping missions under UN or OSCE auspices as well as closer international cooperation in military training.

Since 1999, the Swiss army is participating through SWISSCOY in the peace keeping mission of the Kosovo Force (KFOR) based on UN-resolution 1244, with prolonged presence until 2014, after approval by the Swiss federal assembly in Spring 2011. Main duties include the supervision of civilian reconstruction efforts, monitoring and protection of patrimonial sites, military police and medical assistance.

=== Representation of foreign entities and in foreign disputes ===
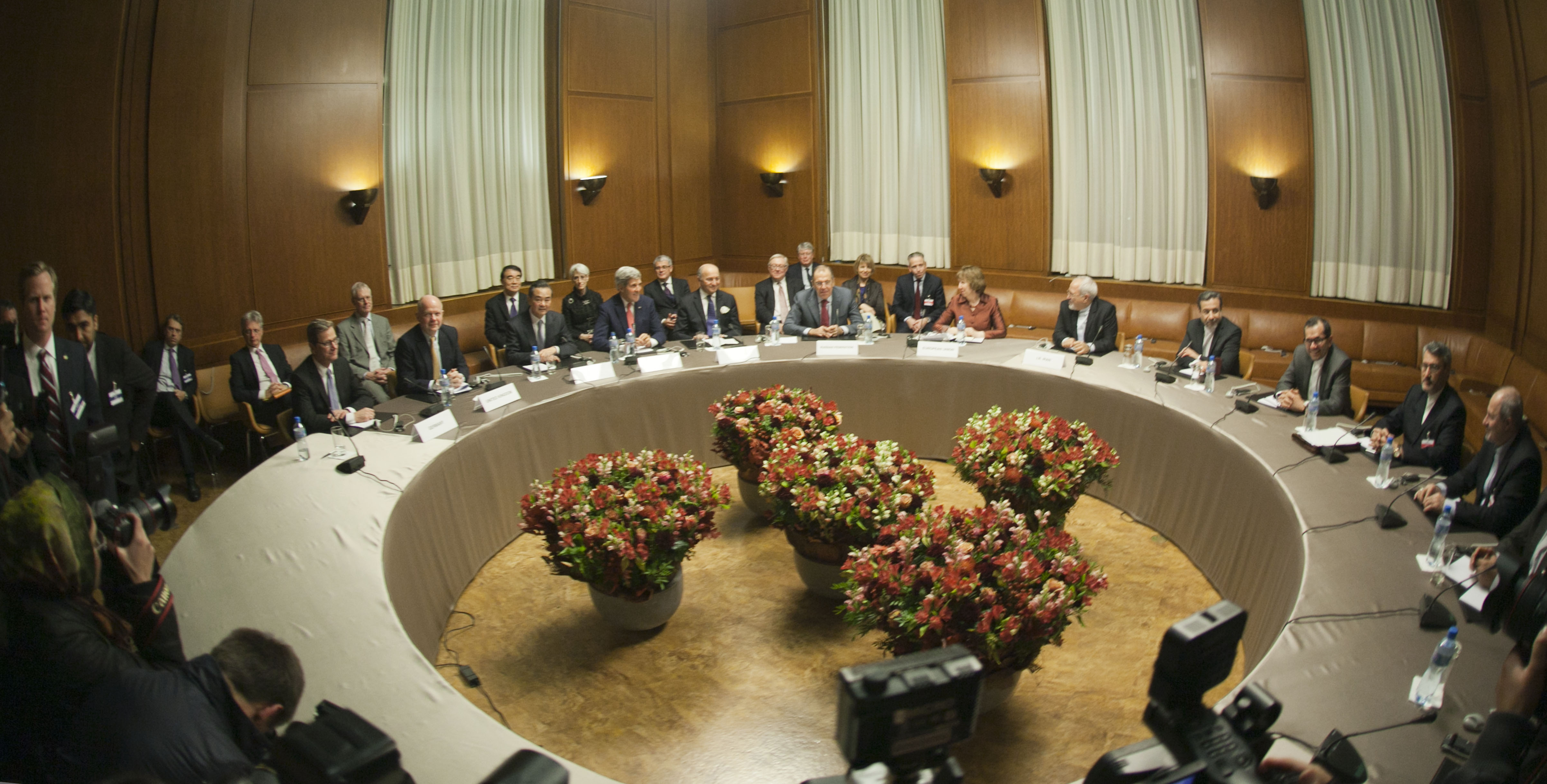
The ministers of foreign affairs of Germany, the United Kingdom, China, the United States, France, Russia, the European Union and Iran meeting in Geneva for the interim agreement on the Iranian nuclear programme (2013).

Under a series of treaties concluded after the First World War, Switzerland assumed responsibility for the diplomatic and consular representation of Liechtenstein, the protection of its borders, and the regulation of its customs.

Due to its long-standing neutrality, Switzerland has served as the protecting power for many countries, that did not have diplomatic relations with each other. This reached an apex during the Second World War, when Switzerland formally undertook 219 mandates for 35 states, and represented another eight states unofficially. After the Second World War, Switzerland served an additional 67 mandates for various countries, including those between Cuba and other nations in the Western Hemisphere after the 1959 Cuban Revolution, between Middle Eastern nations following the outbreak of the Yom Kippur War in 1973, and between India and Pakistan prior to the formalization of relations in 1976.

Switzerland also represented Cuba in the United States between 1991 and 2015. Today, Switzerland has seven protecting power mandates:

- United States interests in both Cuba (until 2015) and Iran
- Cuban interest in the United States (until 2015)
- Iranian interests in both Canada and Egypt
- Saudi Arabian and Iranian interests with each other (Iran and Saudi Arabia have direct diplomatic relations since August 2023)
- Georgian and Russian interests with each other

Switzerland played a key role in brokering a truce agreement between the Sudanese Government and Sudan People's Liberation Army for the Nuba Mountains region, signed after a week's negotiations taking place near Lucerne in January 2002. Switzerland has also sent services to allied troops in the War in Afghanistan.

Switzerland is also playing a major role in Palestinian politics, trying to act as a mediator between Fatah and Hamas regarding the integration of employees in Gaza. The Swiss diplomatic efforts lead to an agreement called "the Swiss Document" which initially was approved by both Palestinian parties.

Following the 2022 Russian invasion of Ukraine, Switzerland decided to adopt all EU sanctions against Russia. According to the Swiss President Ignazio Cassis, the measures were "unprecedented but consistent with Swiss neutrality". The administration also confirmed that Switzerland would continue to offer its services to find a peaceful solution in the conflict. Switzerland only participates in humanitarian missions and provides relief supplies to the Ukrainian population and neighbouring countries. In August 2022, Russia rejected a proposed Swiss mandate to represent Ukrainian interests in Russia, considering that Switzerland had lost its neutral status.

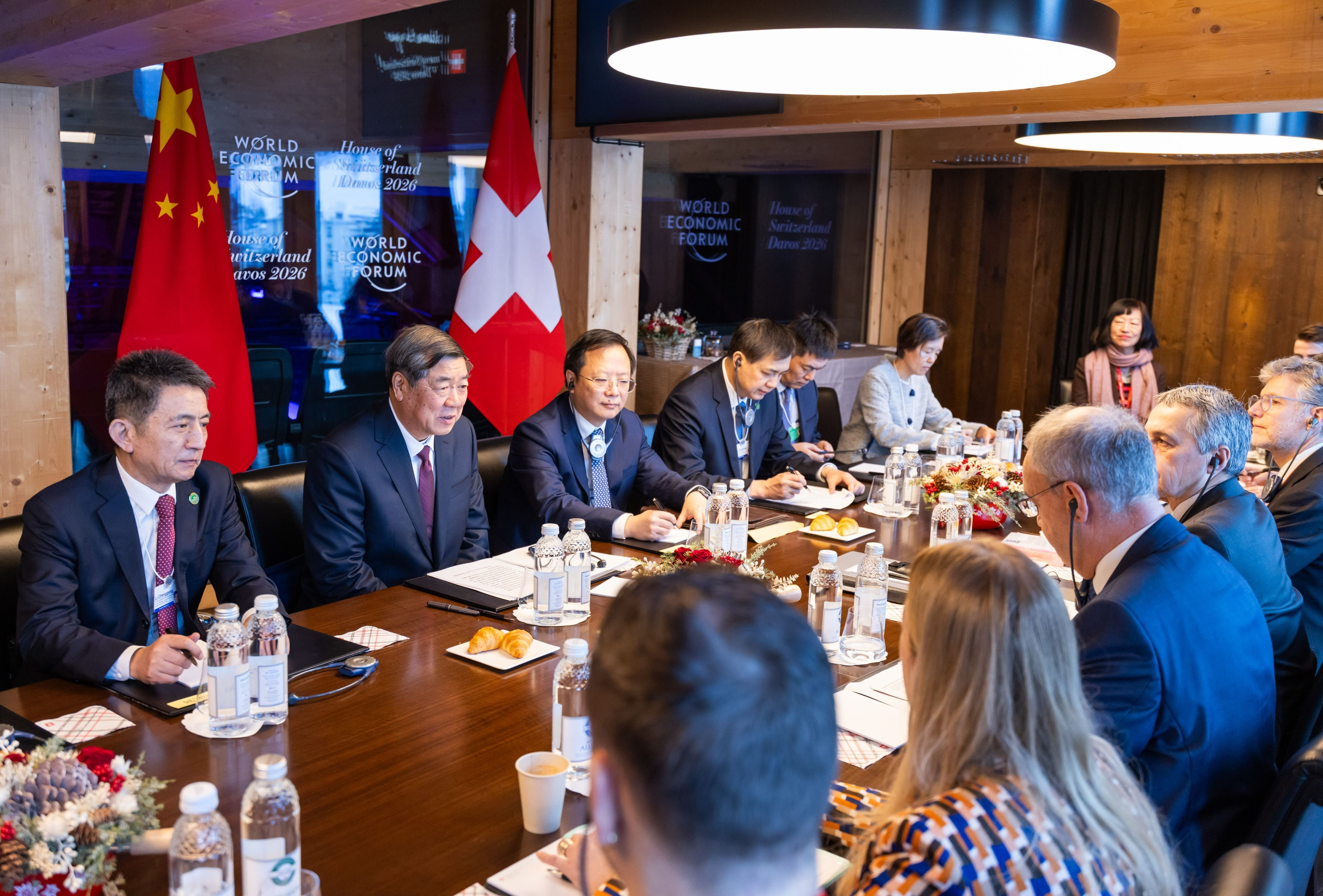
Swiss President Guy Parmelin with Chinese Vice Premier He Lifeng at the 56th World Economic Forum in Davos on 20 January 2026

On 18 April 2023, Federal Councilor Alain Berset paid an official visit to Berlin, Germany at the invitation of Chancellor Olaf Scholz. At the center of the discussions was the refusal by Switzerland to allow the re-exporting of ammunition and arms to the crisis region in Ukraine. While the talks took place in a friendly atmosphere, Alain Berset insisted on the traditional application of Swiss neutrality towards the sale of military hardware to Germany for use in that conflict. A number of parliamentary efforts by Swiss lawmakers to allow such sales were already rejected previously.

On 1 May 2023, Saudi Minister of Industry and Mineral Resources Bandar Al-Khorayef made an official visit to the Swiss Confederation, meeting with Swiss State Secretary for Economic Affairs, Helene Budliger Artieda, and Chairwoman of the Board at Swiss Export Risk Insurance (SERV), Barbara Hayoz. The talks were mainly addressing export cooperation between the two nations, and the Saudi minister also held a talk at the meeting of the World Economic Forum in January 2023. Switzerland also represented Saudi interests in Iran before diplomatic relations were restored in April 2023. Even though the country has a policy of neutrality, its parliament voted in December 2024 to outlaw both Hamas and Hezbollah.

=== Good offices ===
Switzerland is well-known for its "good offices" practices; either acting as mediator directly or supporting negotiations and the mediation of other states or international and regional organisations.

== Diplomatic representations ==
- Diplomatic representations of Switzerland: Official list
- Diplomatic representations in Switzerland: Official list

== Diplomatic relations ==
List of countries which Switzerland maintains diplomatic relations with:

#	Country	Date
1	France	29 November 1516
—	Holy See	17 August 1586
2	Netherlands	31 January 1814
3	Russia	6 March 1814
4	Belgium	30 September 1845
5	United States	29 June 1853
6	Brazil	31 January 1857
7	Italy	27 March 1861
8	Japan	6 February 1864
9	Portugal	5 November 1872
10	Venezuela	10 April 1878
11	Ecuador	22 June 1888
12	Argentina	12 September 1891
13	United Kingdom	1891
14	Uruguay	8 April 1892
15	Paraguay	27 June 1892
16	Peru	7 March 1893
17	Cuba	18 June 1902
18	Panama	6 April 1904
19	Norway	22 January 1906
20	Guatemala	14 December 1906
21	Colombia	14 March 1908
22	Romania	9 May 1911
23	Sweden	3 September 1915
24	Bulgaria	31 October 1915
25	Serbia	10 December 1916
26	Greece	8 October 1917
27	Luxembourg	24 November 1917
28	Chile	31 May 1918
29	Denmark	26 October 1918
30	Hungary	February 1919
31	Iran	4 March 1919
32	Poland	12 March 1919
33	Liechtenstein	March 1919
34	Czech Republic	21 June 1919
35	Turkey	23 March 1925
36	Austria	18 April 1925
37	Finland	26 January 1926
38	Afghanistan	20 April 1928
39	Thailand	28 May 1931
40	Egypt	11 March 1935
41	Spain	14 February 1939
42	Ireland	16 October 1939
43	Haiti	29 September 1941
44	Canada	24 June 1945
45	Mexico	22 December 1945
46	Lebanon	27 February 1946
47	Bolivia	5 March 1946
48	Iraq	1 May 1946
49	Syria	7 May 1946
50	Iceland	15 July 1947
51	India	14 August 1948
52	Jordan	26 March 1949
53	Pakistan	13 May 1949
54	China	14 September 1950
55	Israel	25 June 1951
56	Indonesia	2 November 1951
57	South Africa	11 March 1952
58	Ethiopia	2 May 1952
59	Germany	6 May 1952
60	Myanmar	19 September 1956
61	Sri Lanka	5 October 1956
62	Tunisia	30 October 1956
63	Nepal	9 November 1956
64	Morocco	28 November 1956
65	Saudi Arabia	29 November 1956
66	Costa Rica	18 June 1957
67	Dominican Republic	8 August 1957
68	Honduras	12 August 1957
69	Philippines	30 August 1957
70	Laos	3 September 1957
71	Nicaragua	30 October 1958
72	Monaco	27 May 1959
73	Somalia	5 July 1960
74	Ghana	19 July 1960
75	Guinea	19 July 1960
76	Liberia	19 July 1960
77	Togo	19 July 1960
78	El Salvador	22 August 1960
79	Nigeria	1 October 1960
80	Sudan	27 December 1960
81	Senegal	11 April 1961
82	Mali	26 May 1961
83	Mauritania	26 May 1961
84	Niger	26 May 1961
85	Ivory Coast	1 June 1961
86	Madagascar	13 June 1961
87	Australia	5 September 1961
88	Libya	5 September 1961
89	Burkina Faso	17 October 1961
90	Cameroon	9 November 1961
91	Benin	21 November 1961
92	Sierra Leone	25 May 1962
93	Democratic Republic of the Congo	12 October 1962
94	Algeria	13 November 1962
95	New Zealand	4 December 1962
96	Jamaica	12 December 1962
97	Malaysia	3 January 1963
98	South Korea	11 February 1963
99	Cambodia	26 March 1963
100	Trinidad and Tobago	12 July 1963
101	Rwanda	12 November 1963
102	Cyprus	3 December 1963
103	Chad	16 December 1963
104	Burundi	13 January 1964
105	Central African Republic	11 February 1964
106	Gabon	11 February 1964
107	Kenya	28 February 1964
108	Uganda	1 March 1964
109	Republic of the Congo	21 April 1964
110	Tanzania	26 April 1964
111	Mongolia	22 May 1964
112	Kuwait	21 February 1966
113	Malta	25 March 1966
114	Gambia	30 March 1966
115	Zambia	10 June 1966
116	Malawi	19 May 1966
117	Singapore	11 October 1967
118	Botswana	22 August 1967
119	Lesotho	22 August 1967
120	Equatorial Guinea	4 November 1968
121	Mauritius	11 March 1969
122	Eswatini	6 August 1969
123	Albania	20 July 1970
124	Vietnam	11 October 1971
125	Yemen	23 February 1972
126	Bangladesh	14 June 1972
127	Bahrain	12 September 1973
128	Oman	12 September 1973
129	Qatar	12 September 1973
130	United Arab Emirates	12 September 1973
131	Bahamas	5 June 1974
132	North Korea	20 December 1974
133	Mozambique	12 April 1976
134	Papua New Guinea	2 June 1976
135	Angola	30 September 1976
136	Comoros	1 March 1977
137	Guyana	24 May 1977
138	Suriname	11 July 1979
139	Saint Vincent and the Grenadines	1979
140	Barbados	4 March 1980
141	Cape Verde	25 June 1980
142	Zimbabwe	2 July 1980
143	Seychelles	10 March 1981
144	Maldives	23 June 1981
145	Samoa	1 August 1981
146	Grenada	1981
147	Vanuatu	5 May 1982
148	Djibouti	23 December 1982
149	Guinea-Bissau	22 February 1983
150	Antigua and Barbuda	14 December 1983
151	Brunei	November 1984
152	São Tomé and Príncipe	28 February 1985
153	Tonga	13 September 1985
154	Bhutan	16 September 1985
155	Belize	July 1989
156	Fiji	1989
157	Namibia	24 March 1990
158	Estonia	4 September 1991
159	Latvia	5 September 1991
160	Lithuania	5 September 1991
161	Azerbaijan	21 January 1992
162	Croatia	30 January 1992
163	Slovenia	31 January 1992
164	Ukraine	6 February 1992
165	Belarus	10 February 1992
166	Kyrgyzstan	14 February 1992
167	Armenia	30 April 1992
168	Uzbekistan	7 May 1992
169	Kazakhstan	1 June 1992
170	Georgia	10 June 1992
171	Turkmenistan	13 July 1992
172	Moldova	2 September 1992
173	Saint Kitts and Nevis	17 November 1992
174	Tajikistan	9 December 1992
175	Slovakia	1 January 1993
176	Bosnia and Herzegovina	3 February 1993
177	North Macedonia	31 January 1994
178	Eritrea	22 March 1994
179	San Marino	10 July 1995
180	Andorra	6 September 1995
181	Palau	31 August 2001
182	Timor-Leste	16 September 2002
183	Marshall Islands	22 January 2003
184	Federated States of Micronesia	22 April 2003
185	Nauru	2003
186	Kiribati	1 June 2004
187	Tuvalu	4 November 2005
188	Dominica	2005
189	Saint Lucia	10 June 2006
190	Montenegro	5 July 2006
191	Solomon Islands	20 December 2007
—	Kosovo	28 March 2008
—	Cook Islands	7 March 2011
192	South Sudan	23 May 2012
—	Niue	9 August 2023

=== Multilateral ===
Organization	Formal Relations Began	Notes
European Union	1972	See Switzerland–European Union relations: Switzerland is not a member of the European Union.
NATO		See Switzerland–NATO relations: Switzerland is not a member of NATO.; Switzerland joined the NATO Partnership for Peace on 11 December 1996.

== Bilateral relations ==
=== Africa ===
Country	Formal relations began	Notes
Chad	16 December 1963	Both countries established diplomatic relations on 16 December 1963 when appointed first Ambassador of Switzerland to Chad (resident in Lagos) Mr. Giovanni Enrico Bucher: Chad has an embassy in Geneva.; Switzerland has a Cooperation Office in N'Djamena.
Egypt	11 March 1935	See Egypt–Switzerland relations Both countries established diplomatic relations on 11 March 1935 when Mr. Henri Martin, first Minister of Switzerland to Egypt, presented his letters of credentials.: Egypt has an embassy in Bern.; Switzerland has an embassy in Cairo.
Kenya	28 February 1964	See Kenya–Switzerland relations Both countries established diplomatic relations on 28 February 1964 when appointed first Ambassador of Switzerland to Kenya (resident in Addis Ababa) Mr. Roger Dürr: Kenya has an embassy in Bern.; Switzerland has an embassy in Nairobi.
South Africa	11 March 1952	See South Africa–Switzerland relations: South Africa has an embassy in Bern.; Switzerland has an embassy in Pretoria and a general consulate in Cape Town.; South African Department of Foreign Affairs about relations with Switzerland; Swiss Federal Department of Foreign Affairs about relations with South Africa

=== Americas ===
Country	Formal relations began	Notes
Argentina	12 September 1891	See Argentina–Switzerland relations: Argentina has an embassy in Bern.; Switzerland has an embassy in Buenos Aires.; List of Treaties ruling relations Argentina and Switzerland (Argentine Foreign Ministry, in Spanish); Swiss Federal Department of Foreign Affairs about relations with Argentina
Canada	1945	See Canada–Switzerland relations: Canada has an embassy in Bern and a consulate in Geneva.; Switzerland has an embassy in Ottawa and consulates-general in Montreal, Toronto and Vancouver.
Colombia		See Colombia–Switzerland relations: Colombia has an embassy in Bern.; Switzerland has an embassy in Bogotá.
Dominican Republic	1936	See Dominican Republic-Switzerland relations: Dominican Republic has an embassy in Bern and a consulate in Zürich; Switzerland has an embassy in Santo Domingo; The DR is home to the largest Swiss community in the Caribbean
Mexico	1827	See Mexico–Switzerland relations: Mexico has an embassy in Bern.; Switzerland has an embassy in Mexico City.; Both countries are members of the Organisation for Economic Co-operation and Development.
Peru		Main article: Peru–Switzerland relations: Peru has an embassy in Bern.; Switzerland has an embassy in Lima
United States	1853	See Switzerland–United States relations The first official U.S.–Swiss consular relations were established in the late 1820s. Diplomatic relations were established in 1853 by the U.S. and in 1868 by Switzerland. The U.S. ambassador to Switzerland is also accredited to the Principality of Liechtenstein.: Switzerland has an embassy in Washington, D.C., and consulates-general in Atlanta, Boston, Chicago, Los Angeles, New York City and San Francisco.; United States has an embassy in Bern and maintains consular agencies in Geneva and Zürich.
Uruguay	1828	See Switzerland–Uruguay relations Both countries share a long history of mutual economic relations, and they established diplomatic relations in 1828. Uruguay became a popular destination for Swiss migrants starting in the 1860s. In 1931 Uruguay called for a Swiss style parliamentary system. In the twentieth century, Uruguay has looked to Switzerland as a model for government, historical and cultural ties go back to at least the nineteenth century. There are 956 people with Swiss passports residing in Uruguay in 2009. Uruguay was described as the "Switzerland of the Americas" in a 1951 The New York Times article for its popularity as a haven for capital fleeing Europe at the time and its adoption of Swiss-inspired banking laws. Thomas J. Knight also wrote that "Uruguay has for most of its history been the 'Switzerland' of South America.": Switzerland has an embassy in Montevideo.; Uruguay has an embassy in Bern.

=== Asia ===
Country	Formal relations began	Notes
Armenia		See Armenia–Switzerland relations Switzerland recognized Armenia as an independent state on 23 December 1991. The two countries have maintained diplomatic relations ever since.: Armenia has an embassy in Geneva.; Switzerland has an embassy in Yerevan.
Azerbaijan	21 January 1992	See Azerbaijan–Switzerland relations: Azerbaijan has an embassy in Bern; Switzerland has an embassy in Baku.
China		See China–Switzerland relations: China has an embassy in Bern and a consulate in Zürich.; Switzerland has an embassy in Beijing and consulates-general in Guangzhou, Hong Kong and Shanghai.
India	1948	See India–Switzerland relations: India has an embassy in Bern and consulates in Geneva and Zürich.; Switzerland has an embassy in New Delhi and a consulate in Bangalore and Mumbai.; India is one of Switzerland's most important partners in Asia. Bilateral and political contacts are constantly developing, and trade and scientific cooperation between the two countries are flourishing. Switzerland was the first country in the World to sign a Friendship treaty with India in 1947.
Indonesia	2 November 1951	See Indonesia–Switzerland relations: In 2010, the heads of state of the two countries agreed to launch negotiations on a Comprehensive Economic Partnership Agreement.; Switzerland has named Indonesia as one of seven priority countries for economic development co-operation.; Indonesia has an embassy in Bern, while Switzerland has an embassy in Jakarta, also accredited for East Timor and ASEAN.; On 6 December 1973, the Indonesian and Swiss governments signed an agreement to establish Polytechnic for Mechanics within the Bandung Institute of Technology at Bandung. Today, the Swiss Mechanics Polytechnic has transformed into Bandung State Polytechnic for Manufacture.
Iran	4 March 1919	See Iran–Switzerland relations: Iran has an embassy in Bern.; Switzerland has an embassy in Tehran.; On 11 March 2026, Switzerland temporarily closed its embassy in Tehran due to the Middle East war.
Iraq	1 May 1946	See Iraq–Switzerland relations In November 2000 Switzerland opened a diplomatic liaison office in Baghdad to safeguard its interests. Bilateral relations became closer after the Iraq War in 2003.: Iraq has an embassy in Bern.; Switzerland is accredited to Iraq from its embassy in Amman, Jordan.
Israel		See Israel–Switzerland relations Switzerland recognized Israel on 25 January 1949 and opened a consulate in Tel Aviv.: Israel has an embassy in Bern.; Switzerland has an embassy in Tel Aviv and an honorary consulate in Eilat.; See also History of the Jews in Switzerland; Israeli embassy in Bern (in French, German and Italian only); Swiss Department of Foreign Affairs about the relation with Israel
Kazakhstan		Kazakhstan has an embassy in Bern.; Switzerland has an embassy in Astana.
Malaysia	1963	See Malaysia–Switzerland relations: Malaysia has an embassy in Bern.; Switzerland has an embassy in Kuala Lumpur.
North Korea	December 1974	See North Korea–Switzerland relations: North Korea has an embassy in Bern.; Switzerland is accredited to North Korea from its embassy in Beijing, China.
Northern Cyprus		Northern Cyprus has a Representative Office in Geneva.
Pakistan		See Pakistan–Switzerland relations Switzerland recognised Pakistan's independence from Great Britain in 1947, and the two states established diplomatic relations in 1949. Switzerland ranks fifth in terms of foreign direct investment in Pakistan.: Pakistan has an embassy in Bern.; Switzerland has an embassy in Islamabad and a consulate-general in Karachi.
Palestine		See Palestine–Switzerland relations Switzerland has a representative office in Ramallah.: Palestine has an embassy in Bern.; Switzerland has a representative office in Ramallah.
Philippines	1957	See Philippines–Switzerland relations Bilateral ties between the Philippines and Switzerland dates back to the early 19th century when Swiss traders, missionaries and travelers went to Southeast Asia. A Swiss representation in the Philippines was proposed in 1851, which was realized with the opening of a Swiss honorary consulate in Manila in 1862. Formal relations was established between the two countries on 30 August 1957.: Philippines has an embassy in Bern.; Switzerland has an embassy in Manila.
Singapore		Singapore is accredited to Switzerland from its Ministry of Foreign Affairs based in Singapore.; Switzerland has an embassy in Singapore.; Bilateral relations Switzerland–Singapore
South Korea	11 February 1963	See South Korea–Switzerland relations The establishment of diplomatic relations between South Korea and the Switzerland began on 11 February 1963.: South Korea and Switzerland have had a close relationship since the Korean War.; South Korea has an embassy in Bern.; Switzerland has an embassy in Seoul.; Swiss Department of Foreign Affairs about the relation with the Republic of Korea (in German only); the MOFA of the Republic of Korea about the relation with Swiss Confederation (in Korean only)
Sri Lanka	7 November 1956	See Sri Lanka-Switzerland relations: Sri Lanka has an embassy in Bern, Switzerland.; Switzerland has an embassy in Colombo.
Thailand	28 May 1931	See Foreign relations of Thailand Both countries established diplomatic relations on 28 May 1931.: Thailand has an embassy in Bern.; Switzerland has an embassy in Bangkok.
Turkey		See Switzerland–Turkey relations: Switzerland has an embassy in Ankara and a consulate-general in Istanbul.; Turkey has an embassy in Bern and consulates-general in Geneva and Zürich.; Both countries are full members of the Council of Europe.
United Arab Emirates	12 September 1973	See Switzerland–United Arab Emirates relations: Switzerland has an embassy in Abu Dhabi and a consulate-general in Dubai.; The UAE has an embassy in Bern.

=== Europe ===
Country	Formal relations began	Notes
Austria	1687	See Austria–Switzerland relations: Austria has an embassy in Bern.; Switzerland has an embassy in Vienna.; Both countries are full members of the Council of Europe.
Belarus	1992	Switzerland recognized Belarus on 23 December 1991.; Belarus has an embassy in Bern.; Switzerland has an embassy in Minsk.; Swiss Federal Department of Foreign Affairs about relations with Belarus
Belgium	30 September 1845	Both countries established diplomatic relations on 30 September 1845 when Constantin Rodenbach has been appointed as first Belgian Charge d'Affaires to Switzerland.: Belgium has an embassy in Bern.; Switzerland has an embassy in Brussels.
Bulgaria	1905	Switzerland recognized Bulgaria on 28 November 1879.; Bulgaria has an embassy in Bern.; Switzerland has an embassy in Sofia.; Swiss Federal Department of Foreign Affairs about relations with Bulgaria
Croatia		See Croatia–Switzerland relations: Croatia has an embassy in Bern a general consulate in Zürich and 2 honorary consulates in Lugano and Massagno.; Switzerland has an embassy in Zagreb a consulate in Split and honorary consulate in Smoljanci.; More than 45,000 Croats live in Switzerland.; Croatian Ministry of Foreign Affairs and European Integration: list of bilateral treaties signed with Switzerland; Swiss Federal Department of Foreign Affairs about relations with Croatia
Denmark	1875	See Denmark–Switzerland relations: Denmark has an embassy in Bern.; Switzerland has an embassy in Copenhagen.
Finland		Finland has an embassy in Bern.; Switzerland has an embassy in Helsinki.
France	April 1521	See France–Switzerland relations: France has an embassy in Bern and consulates-general in Geneva and Zürich.; Switzerland has an embassy in Paris, at the Hôtel de Besenval, and consulates-general in Lyon, Marseille and Strasbourg.
Germany	1871	See Germany–Switzerland relations: Germany has an embassy in Bern.; Switzerland has an embassy in Berlin and consulates-general in Frankfurt, Munich and Stuttgart.
Greece	8 October 1917	See Greece–Switzerland relations: Greece has an embassy in Bern and consulates-general in Geneva.; Switzerland has an embassy in Athens.
Italy	12 February 1860	See Italy–Switzerland relations: Italy has an embassy in Bern and consulates-general in Geneva, Lugano and Zürich and a consulate in Basel.; Switzerland has an embassy in Rome and a consulate-general in Milan.
Kosovo		See Kosovo–Switzerland relations Switzerland recognized Kosovo on 27 February 2008. Switzerland has an embassy in Pristina since 28 March 2008. Kosovo will open an embassy in Bern. In September 2008, Swiss authorities initially expressed reservation for Designate Ambassador Naim Mala due to his double nationality but latter accepted him. Switzerland currently has 212 troops serving in Kosovo as peacekeepers in the NATO led Kosovo Force.
Liechtenstein		See Liechtenstein–Switzerland relations: Liechtenstein has an embassy in Bern.; Switzerland is accredited to Liechtenstein from its Federal Department of Foreign Affairs in Bern and maintains an honorary consulate in Vaduz.
Moldova	2 September 1992	See Moldova–Switzerland relations: Moldova has an embassy in Geneva.; Switzerland is accredited to Moldova from its embassy in Kyiv, Ukraine and maintains an honorary consulate in Chișinău.; Moldovan Ministry of Foreign Affairs and European Integration about relations with Switzerland; Switzerland Federal Department of Foreign Affairs about relations with Moldova
Netherlands		the Netherlands has an embassy in Bern.; Switzerland has an embassy in The Hague.
Poland		Poland has an embassy in Bern.; Switzerland has an embassy in Warsaw.
Romania		See Romania–Switzerland relations Since the 1990s, Switzerland has helped Romania financially, for a total sum of 140 million Swiss Francs between 1996 and 2006, and an additional 23 million Francs in 2006–2007. Switzerland has become the 12th largest foreign investor in Romania. In 2005, Romania exported goods to Switzerland for a total of 206 million Swiss Francs, with Switzerland exporting for 547 million Swiss Francs to Romania, making Romania the biggest partner of Switzerland in South-West Europe. By 2006, this had increased by 26% from Romania and 38% from Switzerland.: Romania has an embassy in Bern.; Switzerland has an embassy in Bucharest.
Russia	1816	See Russia–Switzerland relations Switzerland opened a consulate in Saint Petersburg in 1816, upgrading it to a legation 90 years later. The two countries broke off diplomatic relations in 1923, when Russia was going through a period of revolutionary turmoil – and they were not resumed until 1946.: Russia has an embassy in Bern and a consulate-general in Geneva.; Switzerland has an embassy in Moscow and a consulate-general in Saint Petersburg.
Serbia	1916	See Serbia–Switzerland relations: Serbia has an embassy in Bern and consulates-gernal in Geneva and Zürich.; Switzerland has an embassy in Belgrade.; There are around 186,000 people of Serbian descent living in Switzerland. The Serbs are the fourth largest foreign population in Switzerland.; Serbian Ministry of Foreign Affairs about the relation with Switzerland; Swiss Federal Department of Foreign Affairs about the relation with Serbia
Spain		See Spain–Switzerland relations: Spain has an embassy in Bern.; Switzerland has an embassy in Madrid.
Ukraine	1991	See Switzerland–Ukraine relations: Switzerland has an embassy in Kyiv.; Ukraine has an embassy in Bern.; Swiss Federal Department of Foreign Affairs about the relation with Ukraine
United Kingdom	1891	See Switzerland–United Kingdom relations British Prime Minister Rishi Sunak with Swiss President Viola Amherd at a Ukraine peace summit in Bürgenstock Resort, June 2024. Switzerland established diplomatic relations with the United Kingdom in 1891.: Switzerland maintains an embassy in London, an honorary consulate general in Edniburgh, and honorary consulates in Belfast, Bermuda, Cardiff, the Cayman Islands, Gibraltar, and Manchester.; The United Kingdom is accredited to Switzerland through its embassy in Bern.; Both countries share common membership of the Council of Europe, European Court of Human Rights, the International Criminal Court, OECD, OSCE, and the World Trade Organization. Bilaterally the two countries have the Berne Financial Services Agreement, a Double Taxation Convention, and a Trade Agreement. Both two countries are currently negotiating a Free Trade Agreement.

=== Oceania ===
Country	Formal relations began	Notes
Australia	1961	See Australia–Switzerland relations Switzerland opened a consulate in Sydney in 1855 and one in Melbourne in 1856. Both countries established diplomatic relations in 1961.: Australia has an embassy in Bern and a consulate-general in Geneva.; Switzerland has an embassy in Canberra and a consulate-general in Sydney.; Australian Department of Foreign Affairs and Trade about relations with Switzerland; Swiss Federal Department of Foreign Affairs about relations with Australia
New Zealand	1963	Switzerland opened a consulate in Auckland in 1912. Both countries established diplomatic relations in 1963.: New Zealand is accredited to Switzerland from its embassy in Berlin, Germany and maintains a consulate-general in Geneva.; Switzerland has an embassy in Wellington.; New Zealand Ministry of Foreign Affairs and Trade about relations with Switzerland; Swiss Federal Department of Foreign Affairs about relations with New Zealand

== See also ==
- Diplomatic Documents of Switzerland
- List of diplomatic missions in Switzerland
- List of diplomatic missions of Switzerland
- Politics of Switzerland
