= Switzerland–NATO relations =

- NATO: Switzerland

Map of Europe with countries in six different colors based on their affiliation with NATO as follows: Members of NATO Membership Action Plan / Enhanced Opportunity Partner Individual Partnership Action Plan Partnership for Peace; Note that Membership Action Plan and Individual Partnership Action Plan countries are also Partnership for Peace members. States acceding to NATO replace Partnership for Peace membership with formal entry into the Alliance.

Switzerland is a neutral European country, which is not a member of the North Atlantic Treaty Organization (NATO). Since 1996, Switzerland has participated in NATO's Partnership for Peace (PfP) programme. Switzerland is surrounded by the European Union but not an EU member itself, thereby also maintaining its neutrality with regard to EU membership and the EU mutual defence clause enshrined in Article 42.7 of the consolidated version of the Treaty on European Union, although the EU treaty also provides for neutral countries to maintain their neutrality.

NATO member In the process of accession Promised invitations Membership is not the goal Have not announced their membership intentions

NATO members and partners in Europe NATO members Membership Action Plan countries Intensified Dialogue countries Individual Partnership Action Plan countries Partnership for Peace members Aspiring Partnership for Peace members

== Background ==
=== Historical neutrality ===
Neutrality is one of the main principles of Switzerland's foreign policy which dictates that Switzerland is not to be involved in armed or political conflicts between other states. This policy is self-imposed and designed to ensure external security and promote peace.

Switzerland has the oldest policy of military neutrality in the world; it has not participated in a foreign war since its neutrality was established by the Treaty of Paris in 1815.

Although the European powers (Austria, France, the United Kingdom, Portugal, Prussia, Russia, Spain and Sweden) agreed at the Congress of Vienna in May 1815 that Switzerland should be neutral, final ratification was delayed until after Napoleon Bonaparte was defeated so that some coalition forces could invade France via Swiss territory.

The country has a history of armed neutrality going back to the Reformation; it has not been in a state of war internationally since 1815 and did not join the United Nations until 2002. It pursues an active foreign policy and is frequently involved in peace-building processes around the world.

According to Swiss president Ignazio Cassis in 2022 during a World Economic Forum speech, the laws of neutrality for Switzerland are based on The Hague agreement principles which include "no participation in wars; international cooperation but no membership in any military alliance; no provision of troops or weapons to warring parties and no granting of transition rights."

=== Relationship with the European Union ===
Switzerland applied to join the European Union (EU) in 1992; however the application was withdrawn due to public opposition. A referendum to join the European Economic Area was rejected in 1992.

Switzerland is at present associated with the EU through a series of bilateral treaties in which Switzerland has adopted various provisions of European Union law in order to participate in the Union's single market, without joining as a member state. All but one (the microstate Liechtenstein) of Switzerland's neighbouring countries are EU member states.

=== Russian invasion of Ukraine ===
Switzerland follows defined rules to remain neutral in military conflicts, it imposed sanctions for this "serious violation of the most fundamental norms of international law [...] within the scope of its political room for manoeuvre." Swiss law only allows for adoption of sanctions imposed by the United Nations Security Council, the EU or the OECD. Irrespective of the actual laws governing a neutral country, many media outlets still labelled this as a break with 500 years of Swiss neutrality.

In April 2022, the Federal Department of Economic Affairs vetoed Germany's request to re-export Swiss ammunition to Ukraine on the basis of Swiss neutrality. The defence ministry of Switzerland, initiated a report in May 2022 analyzing various military options, including increased cooperation and joint military exercises with NATO.

On 23 March 2023, Swiss Federal Councilor Viola Amherd made an official visit to NATO headquarters in Brussels to discuss the issue of re-exporting Swiss ammunition to Ukraine. This was the first visit of a Federal Councilor there, and while a diplomatic approach between the parties was successful, the Swiss side did not change its position in that regard. Jens Stoltenberg, Secretary General of NATO, said in an interview that he understood the standpoint of Swiss neutrality but could not comprehend why Switzerland would not allow the re-exporting of such arms for the defence of a nation. The Council of States would discuss the issue further in its 2023 June session.

In May the Swiss Federal Council voted in favor to export 25 out-of-service Leopard 2 battle tanks to Germany to replenish their armament but still resisted the demand by NATO to actively re-export military equipment to Ukraine.

In August 2023, the Russian hacker group Joker DPR released secret documents that several Swiss-made weapons systems were indeed to be delivered to the Ukrainian front. Among the possible shipments through Denmark and Baltic states, such as Latvia, are 22 Piranha-III armored vehicles manufactured by Mowag. This re-export was initially stopped by the Swiss government. The leaked documents show that such supply would happen through a middleman and trade with other goods despite ongoing measures by the Swiss to deny the re-export of military equipment to the conflict region. Business deals with 25 Swiss Leopard-2 combat tanks and Piranhas were also published by the Russian hacker group. The State Secretariat for Economic Affairs (SECO) was alarmed by these findings and attempted to safeguard the Swiss policy not to supply arms to the ongoing war.

In a referendum in September 2026, 70% of Swiss voters rejected a constitutional amendment to enshrine a more strict interpretation of its neutrality into the Swiss constitution. If approved, the constitution would have been amended to add clauses outlining that Swiss neutrality is permanent and armed, that it would not join any military alliances nor would it cooperate with any unless it was attacked or an attack was imminent, and that it would not participate in armed conflicts either militarily or through the use sanctions unless authorized by the UN. The referendum was held after a ballot initiative, which was initiated by former Swiss federal councilor Christoph Blocher and supported by the right-leaning Swiss People's Party (SVP), had collected sufficient signatures to be certified. Supporters had argued that economic sanctions, for example against Russia in 2022, had been a violation of Swiss neutrality.

== Opinion polling on Swiss NATO membership ==
Polls on Swiss membership of NATO
Dates conducted	Pollster	Client	Sample size	Support	Opposed	Neutral or DK	Lead	Ref.
7 March 2024	Sweden accedes to NATO							
4 April 2023	Finland accedes to NATO							
3–20 January 2023	LINK Marketing Services AG	ETH Zurich	1,238	31%	?	?	?	
May 2022	?	?	?	33%	?	?	?	
16 March 2022	Tamedia/20 minutes	?	12,437	27%	67%	6%	40%	
24 Feb 2022	Russia invades Ukraine							
2021	?	ETH Zurich	?	25%	?	?	?	
2020	?	ETH Zurich	?	20%	?	?	?	
2019	?	ETH Zurich	?	18%	?	?	?	
2018	?	ETH Zurich	?	19%	?	?	?	
2017	?	ETH Zurich	?	19%	?	?	?	
2016	?	ETH Zurich	?	19%	?	?	?	
2015	?	ETH Zurich	?	22%	?	?	?	
16 March 2014	?	ETH Zurich	?	Russia annexes Crimea	?	?	?	
2014	?	ETH Zurich	?	17%	?	?	?	
2013	?	ETH Zurich	?	19%	?	?	?	
2012	?	ETH Zurich	?	19%	?	?	?	
2011	?	ETH Zurich	?	21%	?	?	?	
2010	?	ETH Zurich	?	21%	?	?	?	
2009	?	ETH Zurich	?	21%	?	?	?	
2008	?	ETH Zurich	?	18%	?	?	?	
2007	?	ETH Zurich	?	21%	?	?	?	
2006	?	ETH Zurich	?	25%	?	?	?	
2005	?	ETH Zurich	?	22%	?	?	?	
2004	?	ETH Zurich	?	18%	?	?	?	
2003	?	ETH Zurich	?	15%	?	?	?	
2002	?	ETH Zurich	?	20%	?	?	?	
2001	?	ETH Zurich	?	28%	?	?	?	
2000	?	ETH Zurich	?	28%	?	?	?	
1999 (2nd)	?	ETH Zurich	?	30%	?	?	?	
1999 (1st)	?	ETH Zurich	?	25%	?	?	?	
1998	?	ETH Zurich	?	28%	?	?	?	
1997	?	ETH Zurich	?	23%	?	?	?	
1996	?	ETH Zurich	?	17%	?	?	?	
1995 (2nd)	?	ETH Zurich	?	19%	?	?	?	
1995 (1st)	?	ETH Zurich	?	29%	?	?	?	
1994	?	ETH Zurich	?	21%	?	?	?	
1993	?	ETH Zurich	?	18%	?	?	?	

In May 2022, another poll indicated 33% of Swiss supported NATO membership for Switzerland, and 56% supported increased ties with NATO.

== Switzerland's foreign relations with NATO member states ==
- Albania
- Belgium
- Bulgaria
- Canada
- Croatia
- Czech Republic
- Denmark
- Estonia
- Finland
- France
- Germany
- Greece
- Hungary
- Iceland
- Italy
- Latvia
- Lithuania
- Luxembourg
- Montenegro
- Netherlands
- North Macedonia
- Norway
- Poland
- Portugal
- Romania
- Slovakia
- Slovenia
- Spain
- Sweden
- Turkey
- United Kingdom
- United States

== See also ==
- Foreign relations of Switzerland
- Foreign relations of NATO
- Enlargement of NATO
- NATO open door policy
- Partnership for Peace
- Swiss neutrality
