= South Korea–Switzerland relations =

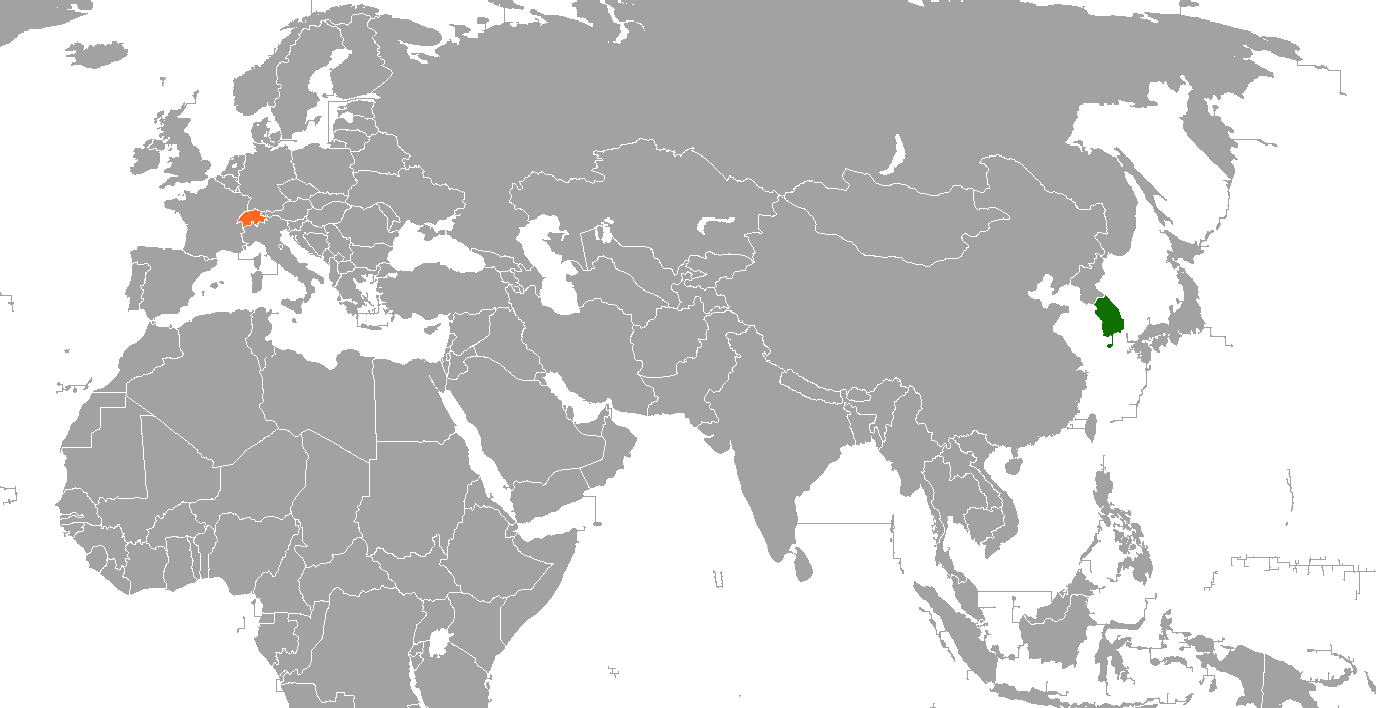
- South Korea: Switzerland

South Korea–Switzerland relations have been continuous since both countries established diplomatic relations around the end of 1962 and beginning of 1963. South Korea has an embassy in Bern and Switzerland has an embassy in Seoul.

== Resident diplomatic missions ==
- South Korea has an embassy in Bern.
- Switzerland has an embassy in Seoul.

== See also ==
- Foreign relations of South Korea
- Foreign relations of Switzerland
- North Korea–Switzerland relations
