= Embassy of Indonesia, Bern =

Embassy in Bern, Switzerland

Embassy of the Republic of Indonesia in Bern Kedutaan Besar Republik Indonesia di Bern Botschaft der Republik Indonesien in Bern

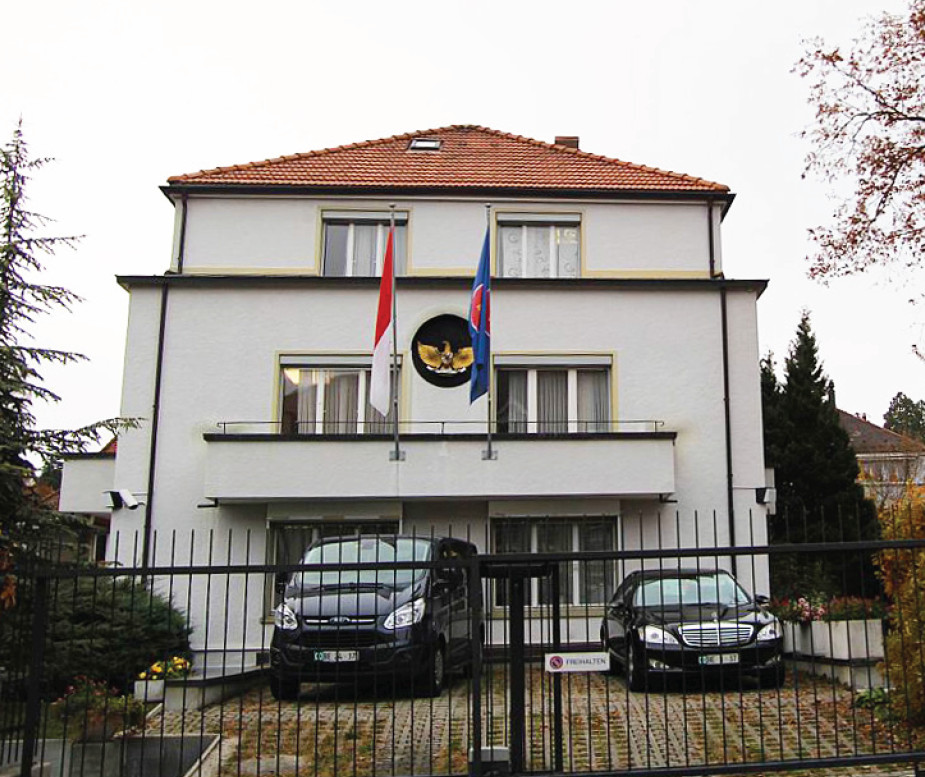
- Location: Bern, Switzerland
- Address: Elfenauweg 51; 3006 Bern, Switzerland
- Coordinates: 46.937174°N 7.466226°E
- Ambassador: Muliaman Darmansyah Hadad
- Jurisdiction: Switzerland; Liechtenstein
- Website: kemlu.go.id/bern/en/

The Embassy of the Republic of Indonesia in Bern (Indonesian: Kedutaan Besar Republik Indonesia di Bern; German: Botschaft der Republik Indonesien in Bern) is the diplomatic mission of the Republic of Indonesia to the Swiss Confederation. The embassy is concurrently accredited to the Principality of Liechtenstein. The permanent mission of the Republic of Indonesia to the United Nations, World Trade Organization and Other International Organizations is located in Geneva. The first Indonesian ambassador to Switzerland was Alfian Yusuf Helmi (1952–1955). The current ambassador, Muliaman Darmansyah Hadad, was appointed by President Joko Widodo on 20 February 2018.

== History ==
The Indonesian Embassy in Bern was opened in 1952. At that time, the embassy also represented Indonesia at the United Nations Office at Geneva and for the General Agreement on Tariffs and Trade (GATT). In 1967, a new permanent representative office for the United Nations in Geneva was established and the embassy no longer represented Indonesian interests in that organization. From 1954 to 1965, the embassy was concurrently accredited to the Holy See. In addition, from 1957 to 1967, the embassy was accredited to Spain. However, based on the history stated by the Indonesian Embassy in Madrid, diplomatic relations with Spain only started in 1976. The current accreditation to Liechtenstein started in 1998.

Initially, the office of the diplomatic mission was located at Hotel Bellevue Palace in Bern. Afterwards, a building located at Wiladingweg 10 was rented for the embassy offices. In 1956, the embassy moved again to Elfenstrasse 9. In 1972, the Indonesian government purchased a building at Elfenauweg 51 and the chancery has been at this location since then.

== See also ==
- Indonesia–Switzerland relations
- List of diplomatic missions of Indonesia
- List of diplomatic missions in Switzerland
