= Swiss neutrality =

Fundamental foreign policy of Switzerland

One of the main principles of Switzerland's foreign policy is that Switzerland is not to be involved in armed conflicts between other states. This policy is self-imposed and designed to ensure external security and promote peace.

Switzerland has the oldest policy of military neutrality in the world; it has not participated in a foreign war since its neutrality was established by the Treaty of Paris in 1815. However, the country did have a civil war in 1847.

Although the European powers (Austria, France, the United Kingdom, Portugal, Prussia, Russia, Spain and Sweden) agreed at the Congress of Vienna in May 1815 that Switzerland should be neutral, final ratification was delayed until after Napoleon Bonaparte was defeated so that some coalition forces could invade France via Swiss territory.

The country has a history of armed neutrality going back to the Reformation; it has not been in a state of war internationally since 1815, joining the League of Nations in 1920 and did not join the United Nations until 2002. It pursues an active foreign policy and is frequently involved in peace-building processes around the world.

On February 28, 2022, Switzerland imposed economic sanctions on Russia and froze a significant amount of assets held by Russian civilians and companies as "punishment" for the invasion of Ukraine. Some described this as "a sharp deviation from the country's traditional neutrality". According to Swiss president Ignazio Cassis in 2022 during a World Economic Forum speech, the laws of neutrality for Switzerland are based on The Hague agreement principles which include "no participation in wars; international cooperation but no membership in any military alliance; no provision of troops or weapons to warring parties and no granting of transition rights".

Swiss citizens rejected a constitutional amendment to enshrine a more strict interpretation of its neutrality into the constitution in a referendum on September 27, 2026.

== Origins ==
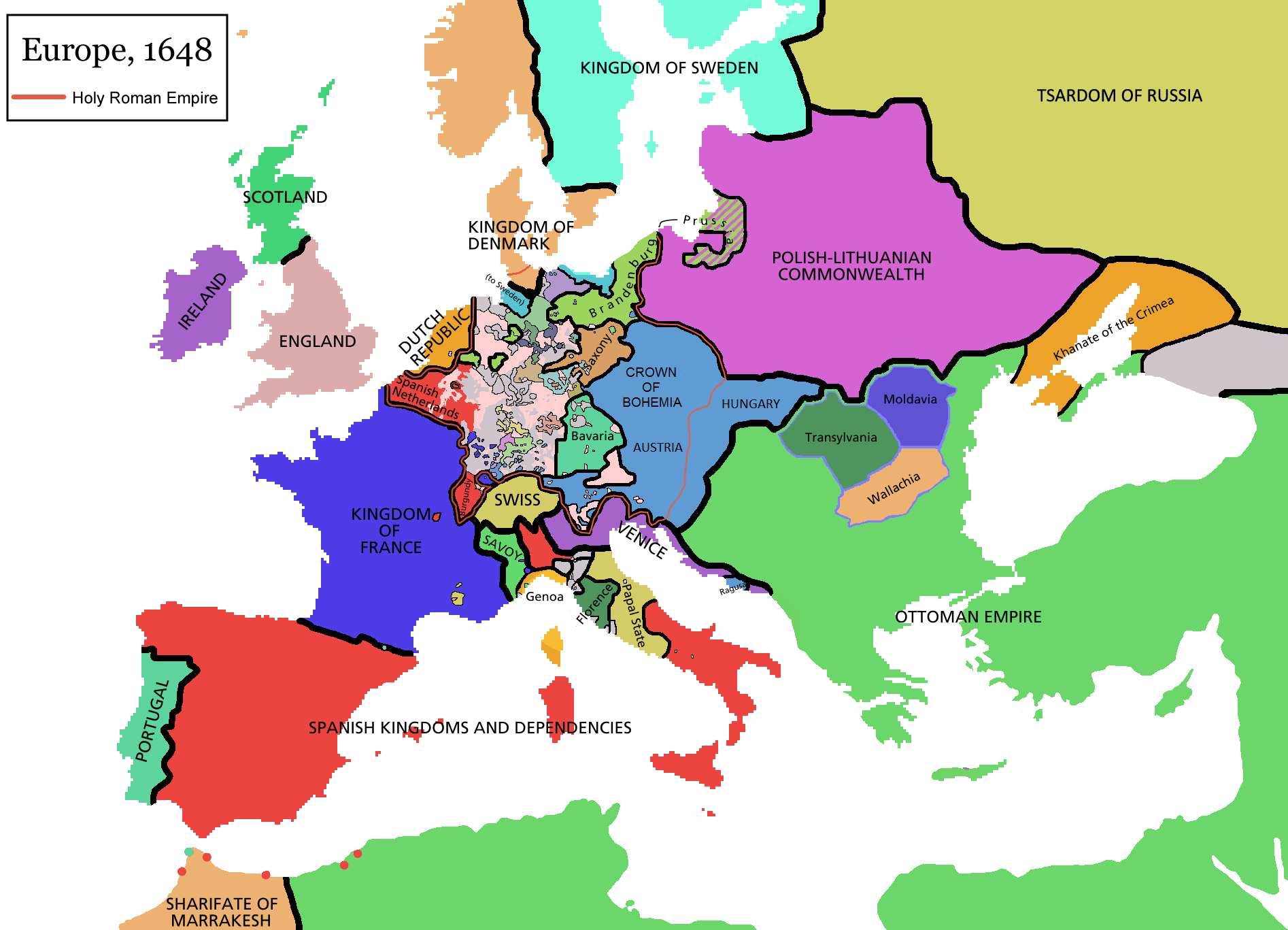
Switzerland after the Peace of Westphalia, 1648

The beginnings of Swiss neutrality can be dated back to the defeat of the Old Swiss Confederacy at the Battle of Marignano in September 1515 or the peace treaty the Swiss Confederacy signed with France on November 12, 1516. Prior to this, the Swiss Confederacy had an expansionist foreign policy.

The Peace of Westphalia in 1648 was another important step in the development of Switzerland's neutrality. Other countries were disallowed from passing through Swiss territory, and the Confederation became legally independent from the Holy Roman Empire, even though it had been independent from the Empire de facto since 1499.

The 1798 invasion of Switzerland by the French First Republic culminated in the creation of a satellite state called the Helvetic Republic. While the 1798 Swiss constitution and the 1803 Act of Mediation stated that France would protect Swiss independence and neutrality, these promises were not kept. With the latter act, Switzerland signed a defensive alliance treaty with France. During the Restoration, the Swiss Confederation's constitution and the Treaty of Paris's Act on the Neutrality of Switzerland in 1815 affirmed Swiss neutrality.

The dating of neutrality to 1516 is disputed by modern historians. Prior to 1895, no historian referenced the Battle of Marignano as the beginning of neutrality. The later backdating has to be seen in light of threats by several major powers in 1889 to rescind the neutrality granted to Switzerland in 1815. A publication by Paul Schweizer, titled Geschichte der schweizerischen Neutralität, attempted to show that Swiss neutrality was not granted by other nations, but a decision they took themselves and thus could not be rescinded by others. The later publication of the same name by Edgar Bonjour, published between 1946 and 1975, expanded on this thesis.

== The World Wars ==
=== World War I ===
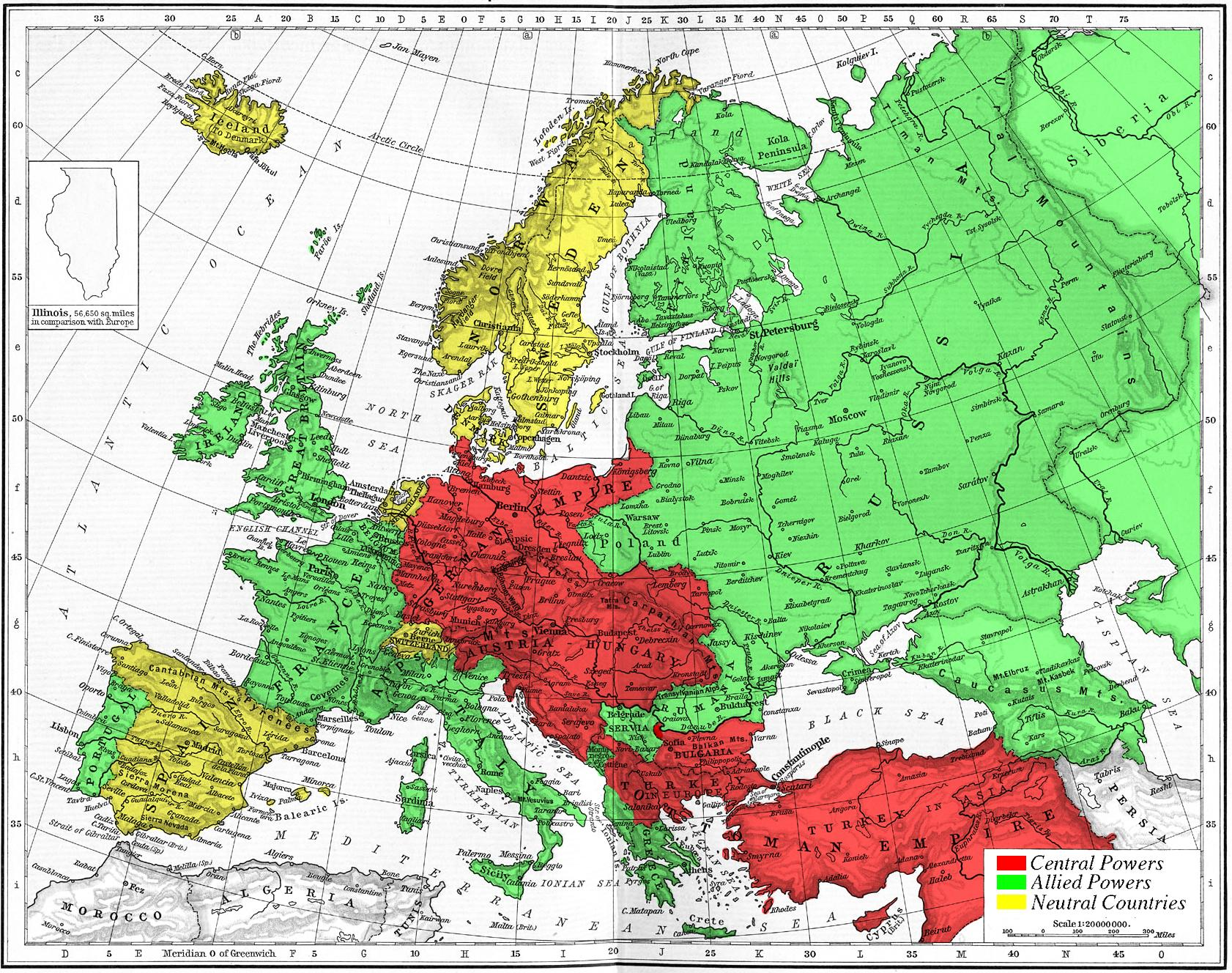
Europe in 1910 with World War I alliances highlighted. Switzerland (yellow) found itself surrounded by members of opposing alliances.

During the First World War, Switzerland sustained its policy of neutrality despite sharing land borders with two of the Central Powers (Germany and Austria-Hungary) and two of the Allied Powers (France and Italy). The German-speaking majority in Switzerland generally favoured the Central Powers whilst the French-speaking and Italian-speaking populations favoured the Allied Powers. This sparked internal tensions; however, the country was able to maintain its neutrality.

In 1917, the neutrality of Switzerland was brought into question by the Grimm-Hoffmann Affair. Robert Grimm, a Swiss socialist politician, visited Russia in an attempt to negotiate a separate peace agreement between Russia and Germany, in order to end the war on the Eastern Front in the interests of socialism. Grimm was supported by Arthur Hoffman, a Swiss Federal Councillor who was in charge of the Political Department and headed the Foreign Ministry. However, Hoffman had not consulted his fellow Councillors over this initiative, and when a telegram sent between Grimm and Hoffman was made public, the Allied Powers were outraged.

=== Interwar period ===
The League of Nations formally recognized Swiss neutrality on February 13, 1920. While the policy was not universally admired, it was respected by other countries. As a tribute, the world organization even chose Geneva as its headquarters. It also exempted Switzerland from military obligations. However, the country was forced to adopt the so-called "differential neutrality", which required Switzerland to participate in economic sanctions while preserving its military neutrality, a policy initially welcomed to establish the Swiss solidarity with international efforts to promote a peaceful world order. By March 1938, however, the Swiss government was increasingly becoming opposed to this type of neutrality and reverted to absolute neutrality. The shift was not only a case of the Swiss realizing the value of their traditional policies but was also attributed to the deteriorating European economic and political relations in a period preceding World War II.

=== World War II ===
Switzerland found itself completely surrounded by the Axis powers and Axis-controlled territory for most of World War II. Prior to Germany's invasion of France, Switzerland rejected an offer to join the allies, which may have contributed to this untenable geographic position. Nazi Germany planned an invasion of Switzerland, and Switzerland made preparations for such an occurrence. At one point, Switzerland mobilized 850,000 soldiers. Under the leadership of Henri Guisan, Switzerland developed its National Redoubt plan in case of an invasion. Although there were skirmishes in the air, resulting in heavy losses to the Luftwaffe, it never escalated to a full war.

Although Switzerland was criticized by many for its ambiguous stance during World War II, its neutrality has been appreciated on several occasions by both European and non-European leaders. The most common criticisms tend to be the profiteering of the Swiss banks and the rejection of Jewish refugees and the taxing of the Jewish community, specifically, in order to support these refugee camps.

Of all the neutrals, Switzerland has the greatest right to distinction ... What does it matter whether she has been able to give us the commercial advantages we desire or has given too many to the Germans ...? She has been a democratic state, standing for freedom in self-defence ... and largely on our side.

— Winston Churchill, Letter to Foreign Secretary Anthony Eden in 1944

From 1943 Switzerland stopped American and British aircraft, mainly bombers, overflying Switzerland during the Second World War. On numerous occasions during the war, Allied aircraft trespassed on Swiss airspace; mostly damaged Allied bombers returning from raids over Italy and Germany whose crews preferred internment by the Swiss to becoming prisoners of war. Over a hundred Allied aircraft crews were interned and placed in ski resorts which were left abandoned due to the lack of tourists after the outbreak of war. They were to be held in there until the war had ended. At least 940 American airmen attempted to escape into France after the invasion of Normandy, but Swiss authorities intercepted 183 internees. Over 160 of these airmen were incarcerated in a Swiss prison camp known as Wauwilermoos, which was located near Lucerne and commanded by André Béguin, a pro-Nazi Swiss officer. The American internees remained in Wauwilermoos until November 1944 when the U.S. State Department lodged protests against the Swiss government and eventually secured their release.

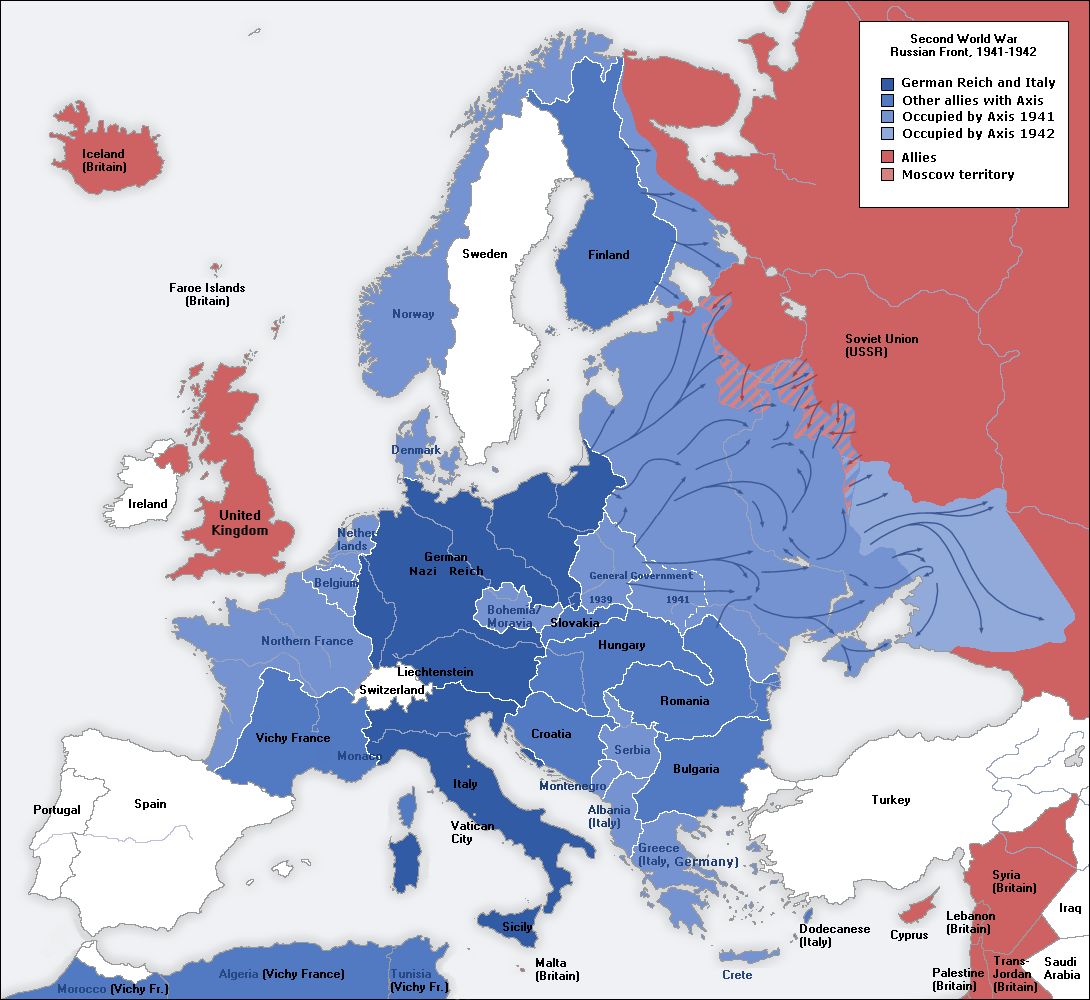
Switzerland was surrounded by territory controlled by the Axis powers from 1940 to 1944.

Switzerland was surrounded by Axis-controlled territory; this meant that they also suffered from Allied bombings during the war. An example of this was when Schaffhausen was accidentally bombed by American planes on April 1, 1944; the town was mistaken for Ludwigshafen am Rhein, a German town 284 kilometres away.

These bombing incidents tested the neutrality of Switzerland as it showed the leniency of the Swiss towards Allied airspace violations. The bombings persisted and eventually Switzerland declared a zero-tolerance policy for violation by either Axis or Allied aircraft and authorised attacks on American aircraft.

The Swiss, although somewhat skeptical, reacted by treating these violations of their neutrality as "accidents". The United States was warned that single aircraft would be forced down, and their crews would still be allowed to seek refuge, while bomber formations in violation of airspace would be intercepted. While American politicians and diplomats tried to minimise the political damage caused by these incidents, others took a more hostile view. Some senior commanders argued that as Switzerland was "full of German sympathisers", it deserved to be bombed. General Henry H. Arnold, Commanding General of the U.S. Army Air Forces, even suggested that it was the Germans themselves who were flying captured Allied planes over Switzerland in an attempt to gain a propaganda victory.

== 1945–present ==
Following World War II, Switzerland began taking a more active role in humanitarian activities.

It joined the United Nations after a March 2002 referendum. 10 years after Switzerland joined the UN, in recorded votes in the United Nations General Assembly, Switzerland occupied a middle position, siding from time to time with member states like the United States and Israel, but at other times with countries like China. In the United Nations Human Rights Council Switzerland sided much more with Western countries and against countries like China and Russia.

Switzerland participated in the development of the International Code of Conduct for Private Security Service Providers (ICoC), intended as an oversight mechanism of private security providers. In September 2015, a "Federal Act on Private Security Services provided Abroad" was introduced, in order to "[preserve] Swiss neutrality", as stated in its first article. It requires Switzerland-based private security companies to declare all operations conducted abroad, and to adhere to the ICoC. Moreover, it states that no physical or moral person falling under this law can participate directly—or indirectly through the offer of private security services—in any hostilities abroad. In 2016, the Section of Private Security Services (SPSS), an organ of the Federal Department of Foreign Affairs in charge of the procedures defined by the new law, has received 300 approval requests.

In 2011, Switzerland registered as a candidate for a seat on the United Nations Security Council in 2023–2024. In a 2015 report requested by parliament, the government stated that a Swiss seat on the Security Council would be "fully compatible with the principles of neutrality and with Switzerland’s neutrality policy". Opponents of the project such as former ambassador Paul Widmer consider that this seat would "put its [Switzerland] neutrality at risk".

In 2014 Switzerland did not adopt EU sanctions against Russia after the annexation of Crimea, but implemented rules that prevented bypassing the sanctions imposed by the European Union.

A 2018 survey found that 95% of Swiss were in favor of maintaining neutrality.

=== Sales of chemical warfare equipment to Iraq ===
Switzerland was involved in the Iraqi invasion of Iran, by providing dual use material and technology that allowed Iraq to target Iranian troops and civilians, leading to more than 100,000 casualties. Switzerland also sold chemical warfare defense equipment to Iran, and later joined a multinational team of specialists dispatched by the UN to Iran to investigate and confirm the casualties.

=== Conflicts in the Middle East ===
The Swiss Armed Forces participated in the U.S.-led War in Afghanistan as observers, in what the Swiss Broadcasting Corporation described as the nation's "first military deployment since 1815". During the 2003 invasion of Iraq, the United States was given permission to use Swiss airspace for surveillance missions over Iraq.

Switzerland sent weapons to Egypt, Bahrain, Saudi Arabia and the United Arab Emirates, some of which were involved in the Saudi Arabian–led intervention in Yemen.

=== Russian invasion of Ukraine ===
The Russian invasion of Ukraine sparked debate over the meaning and status of Swiss neutrality. In February 2022, Switzerland adopted sanctions imposed by the European Union against Russia in response to the invasion. While Switzerland follows defined rules to remain neutral in military conflicts, it imposed sanctions for this "serious violation of the most fundamental norms of international law ... within the scope of its political room for manoeuvre".

According to federal councilor Viola Amherd, Switzerland is only involved in humanitarian missions and will not allow direct shipments of arms to the war zone from or through its territory. Irrespective of the actual laws governing a neutral country, many media outlets still labelled this as a break with 500 years of Swiss neutrality. Russia perceived the sanctions in a similar way, as it rejected Switzerland's offer to mediate the conflict.

In February 2022, Switzerland further adopted the sanctioning of Russia by the European Union and froze many Russian bank accounts. Analysts said the move would affect the Swiss economy.

In April 2022, the Federal Department of Economic Affairs vetoed Germany's request to re-export Swiss ammunition to Ukraine on the basis of Swiss neutrality and the mandatory rejection criteria of the war material legislation. The defence ministry of Switzerland, initiated a report in May 2022 analyzing various military options, including increased cooperation and joint military exercises with NATO. However, NATO membership remains unpopular. A poll from March 2022 found that 27% of those surveyed supported Switzerland joining NATO, while 67% were opposed. Another from May 2022 indicated 33% of Swiss supported NATO membership for Switzerland, and 56% supported increased ties with NATO.

In September 2022 the Parliament of Switzerland voted against a revision of its law to impose independent sanctions. Therefore Switzerland can still only adopt sanctions imposed by the United Nations Security Council, the EU or the OECD.

In July 2023, Switzerland signed a declaration of intent to join the European Sky Shield Initiative (ESSI), to contribute to building a pan-European air and missile defense system, while also allowing the nation to train with and purchase military systems together with other European nations, newly raising questions about the future and practicalities of the policy of neutrality. In October 2024 Switzerland joined the ESSI.

In a referendum in September 2026, 70% of Swiss voters rejected a constitutional amendment to enshrine a more strict interpretation of its neutrality into the Swiss constitution. If approved, the constitution would have been amended to add clauses outlining that Swiss neutrality is permanent and armed, that it would not join any military alliances nor would it cooperate with any unless it was attacked or an attack was imminent, and that it would not participate in armed conflicts either militarily or through the use sanctions unless authorized by the UN. The referendum was held after a ballot initiative, which was initiated by former Swiss federal councilor Christoph Blocher and supported by the right-leaning Swiss People's Party (SVP), had collected sufficient signatures to be certified. Supporters had argued that economic sanctions, for example against Russia in 2022, had been a violation of Swiss neutrality.

== Criticism ==
Swiss neutrality has been questioned at times, notably regarding Switzerland's role during World War II and the ICRC, the looted Nazi gold (and later during Operation Gladio), its economic ties to the apartheid regime in South Africa, and more recently in the Crypto AG espionage case.

Swiss aid to Ukraine after Russia's invasion in February 2022 has led some to questioning whether Switzerland is fully neutral anymore. Some have called for changing the laws of neutrality.

== See also ==
- Neutral country
- Austrian neutrality
- Finlandization
- Irish neutrality
- Moldovan neutrality
- Neutral and Non-Aligned European States
- Non-interventionism
- Swedish neutrality
- Switzerland–NATO relations

== Bibliography ==
- Bonjour, Edgar (1978). "Swiss Neutrality During Two World Wars". In Luck, James Murray; Burckhardt, Lukas F.; Haug, Hans (eds.). Modern Switzerland. The Society for the Promotion of Science and Scholarship Inc. pp. 419–438. ISBN 0-930664-01-9.
- Buclin, Hadrien (Fall 2017). "Swiss Intellectuals and the Cold War: Anti-Communist Policies in a Neutral Country". Journal of Cold War Studies. 19 (4): 137–167. doi:10.1162/jcws_a_00767. S2CID 57565148.
- Thomas Quinn Marabello. "Challenges to Swiss Democracy: Neutrality, Napoleon, & Nationalism," Swiss American Historical Society Review, Jun. 2023, Vol. 59: No. 2. Available at: https://scholarsarchive.byu.edu/sahs_review/vol59/iss2/5
