= Palestine–Switzerland relations =

- Palestine: Switzerland

Palestine–Switzerland relations refer to foreign relations between Palestine and Switzerland. The Swiss government does not recognize the existence of a Palestinian state.

Switzerland has a representative office in Ramallah.

== History ==
Before 1948, Switzerland was represented in the British Mandate of Palestine by a consulate in Jerusalem and a consular agency in Jaffa, which was specifically opened in 1927. In 1975, the Palestine Liberation Organization opened an office in Geneva. The Palestinian President made an official visit in March 2015. He then met with the President of the Swiss Confederation, Simonetta Sommaruga to discuss the Palestinian reconciliation. In January 2022, Switzerland announced its abandonment of the Geneva Initiative and declared the need to redefine its Middle East strategy.

In 2020, Swiss national Philippe Lazzarini was appointed head of United Nations Relief and Works Agency (UNRWA).

In November 2023, Switzerland stopped funding 11 human rights organization in Israel and Palestine in response to Hamas's attack on Israel on 7 October. Ignazio Cassis, Minister of Foreign Affairs, announced the creation of a taskforce on the Middle East headed by Maya Tissafi. Switzerland previously maintained contact with Hamas and did not classify it as a terrorist organization. It also informs Israel of its ties with Hamas. Parts of Switzerland banned pro-Palestinian protests.

Following the Gaza war, Switzerland banned Hamas. It announced further bans on people supporting or funding Hamas would be enacted. Switzerland also announced the ending of funding for three NGOs under review but continued fundings for eight others. The Swiss parliament voted to stop funding to the United Nations Relief and Works Agency (UNRWA). It was passed by the lower house but blocked by the upper house.

== Recognition of a Palestinian state ==
As of early 2026, Switzerland does not formally recognize the State of Palestine as a sovereign state.

=== September 2025 Legal Memo ===
In an internal legal review published on 11 September 2025 by the Directorate for International Law of the Federal Department of Foreign Affairs (FDFA) (and revealed via Swiss Freedom of Information Act request made by Swiss newspaper Blick). Switzerland concluded that bilateral recognition would be, in principle, legally plausible under international law. The Directorate deemed this to be case, even though it recognized that the Palestinian Authority does not have full de facto control of governance of its territories. The review applied a three-elements doctrine (territory, people, and effective government) but classified Palestine as a special case. Citing an International Court of Justice 19 July 2024 advisory opinion as well as Hamas control over Gaza, the FDFA stated that respective criteria for territory and people are met, but the Palestinian Authority lacks complete control due to the Israeli occupation undermining effective Palestinian self-government. However, the report states that these factors by themselves do not block statehood, as no other state officially claims the territory, aside from annexed East Jerusalem (claimed by Israel). The division of authority is thus not permanent. Further, it is emphasized that Palestine has received multilateral recognition as a UN non-member observer state since 2012, a status that Switzerland has supported. The report emphasized that there is no legal requirement to recognize Palestine and that this decision remains a political choice. It compared this situation to Switzerland’s 2008 recognition of Kosovo, which occurred despite Kosovo's lack of full control over its declared territory at that time. Recognition would provide immunities to Palestinian representatives and create neutrality obligations during any armed conflict. However, these obligations would not have immediate effects since Switzerland currently does not export arms or provide military support to any party (including Israel and the Palestinian Authority).

=== Continued non-recognition ===
Despite the Foreign Affairs Department’s conclusion that recognition is plausible, the Swiss Federal Council has stuck to its position that unilateral recognition should only happen as part of a negotiated two-state solution. This requires concrete steps toward peace, a stable Palestinian government, and a political roadmap. Parliamentary proposals for immediate recognition were turned down by the upper house of Swiss parliament, the Council of States in September 2025. President Karin Keller-Sutter reiterated in November 2025 that the necessary conditions have not yet been met.

== See also ==
- Foreign relations of Palestine
- Foreign relations of Switzerland
