= Embassy of Switzerland, Singapore =

Embassy of Switzerland in Singapore
- Location: Singapore
- Address: 1 Swiss Club Link, 288162 Singapore
- Coordinates: 1.342539°N 103.789570°E
- Ambassador: H.E. Frank Grütter

The Embassy of Switzerland in Singapore represents Switzerland's diplomatic mission in Singapore. It is located at 1 Swiss Club Link in Singapore.

H.E. Frank Grütter serves as Ambassador (as of August 2022).

Switzerland operates Singapore and Brunei Darussalam consulate general offices in Singapore.

== History ==
Switzerland first established an honorary consulate in Singapore in March 1917 in response to issues faced by Swiss businesses in World War I due to trading restrictions that were compounded by a lacking diplomatic network, with one of its first tasks being to administer a community-raised fund to help impoverished Swiss citizens residing in or transiting Singapore. The consulate was first located in the Singapore offices of Diethlem & Co. (located on Collyer Quay before being moved in late 1917 to Market Street after the company's new building there was finished) before shifting to the second floor of Union Building in Tanjong Pagar in 1933, with employees of the company going on to serve as honorary consuls. During World War II, the consulate hosted refugees between February and March 1942. The mission was upgraded to a formal consulate in 1960 and to an embassy in 1967.

The current site was acquired from the Swiss Club in 1983, with 8,000 square meters of land being leased for ninety-nine years. Administrative and residence buildings were completed in 1985 while the main chancery was completed in 1987. The effects of the tropical climate necessitate its reconstruction, with a new complex planned in 2021 to be built, finished by 2023.

== See also ==
- Foreign relations of Switzerland
- List of diplomatic missions of Switzerland
