= Colombia–Switzerland relations =

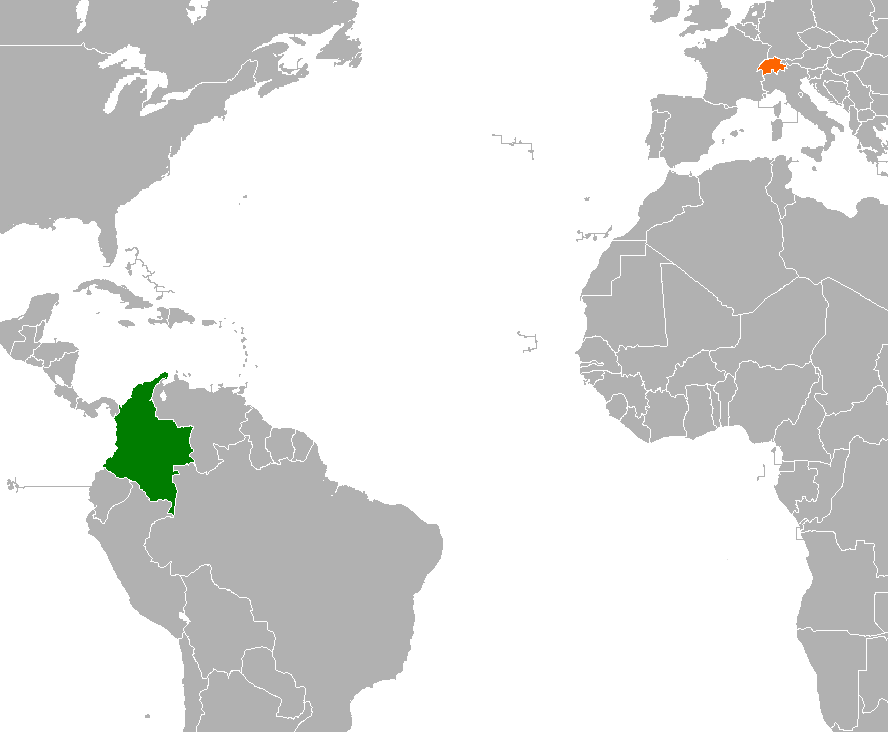
- Colombia: Switzerland

Diplomatic mission
- Embassy of Colombia in Bern: Embassy of Switzerland in Bogotá

Colombia–Switzerland relations are the diplomatic relations between the Republic of Colombia and the Swiss Confederation. Both governments have maintained a friendly relationship since the beginning of the 20th century.

== History ==
Both governments established diplomatic relations in 1908, when they signed the Treaty of Friendship and Commerce. Switzerland arbitrated the border conflict with Venezuela in 1922. In 1943, the Swiss embassy founded the Swiss Colombian Foundation.

== Bilateral agreements ==
Both nations have signed many bilateral agreements such as the Treaty of Friendship and Commerce between the Government of Colombia and the Government of Switzerland (1908); Treaty of Conciliation, Judicial Settlement and Arbitration (1927); Agreement on Military Service in the case of Dual Nationality (1959); Agreement on Technical and Scientific Cooperation (1967); Agreement on Regular Air Transport (1971); Memorandum of Understanding of 27 November 1979 between the Governments of Switzerland and Colombia (1979); Agreement on Swiss Government assistance to the affected area of the Department of Cauca (1983); Special Agreement regarding mixed credit guarantees for the Guavio Dam Hydroelectric Power Project (1986); Special Agreement on facilities granted to Swiss Volunteer Corps to help in disasters (1988); Agreement on the Mixed Financing Line (1990); Agreement for the Project to Promote teaching, research and extension in semen processing, animal improvement and forage analysis (1990); Agreement to strengthen the results obtained in the promotion of research into non-conventional sources of energy for small and medium-sized mining equipment (1990); Additional Loan Agreement for the granting of an additional mixed credit for the Guavio Hydroelectric Project (1992); Agreement on the grant for the mixed financing of the Modernisation of the Agustín Codazzi Cartographic Institute project, Bogotá (Phase II) (1994); Memorandum of understanding between the Swiss Government and the National Association of Industrialists, Corporation Entrepreneurship of the East, Proantioquia, Pontifical Bolivarian University, Mamonal Foundation, Ministry of the Environment and the Regional Autonomous Corporation of Rio Negro (1997); Special Agreement on Cooperation for the Transfer of Environmental Technology between the Government of the Swiss Confederation and the Ministry of the Environment of Colombia, regarding the establishment of the National Centre for Cleaner Production and Environmental Technologies in Colombia (1998); Special Agreement on Cooperation for the Transfer of Environmental Technology (1998); Agreement on the grant for the mixed financing of the project for Strengthening the National Environmental Network, with the Institute of Hydrology, Meteorology and Environmental Studies (IDEAM) (2002); Technical and scientific cooperation agreement on facilities granted to the Swiss humanitarian aid corps in the event of disasters (2003); Convention on the reciprocal promotion and protection of investments and its protocol (2006); Agreement to avoid double taxation in respect of income and wealth taxes (with Protocol) (2007); Agreement between the Ministry of Education of the Republic of Colombia and the Swiss Federal Council, acting on behalf of the cantons of Bern and Valais, regarding the Helvetia School in Bogotá (2008); Colombia-EFTA FTA (Iceland, Liechtenstein, Norway and Switzerland) (2008); Agreement on Agriculture (2010); Agreement concerning the importation and return of cultural goods (2010); Treaty on mutual legal assistance in criminal matters (2011) and an Exchange of diplomatic notes between Switzerland, represented by SECO, and the Republic of Colombia in the project to strengthen the environmental network (FORAC II) (2012).

== Trade relations ==
In 2023, Switzerland imported goods worth a total of CHF 418 million from Colombia, being related to precious stones and metals and agricultural products. Swiss exports to Colombia amounted to CHF 559 million and were mostly chemical and pharmaceutical products, machinery, watches and precision instruments. The Swiss–Colombian Chamber of Commerce has served as a bridge for the promotion of trade between both nations since 1974. Swiss direct investments in Colombia amounted to CHF 5.5 billion by late 2022. Swiss companies operating in the country employed 13,725 people.

== Peace and Human Rights ==
Colombia has been an important country for peace and human rights policy. Switzerland maintains Colombia's conflict resolution efforts and has contributed to multiple peace processes in Colombia. The current programme of the Peace and Human Rights Division (PHRD) centres on the promotion of human rights, civil society participation, handling with the past and transitional justice. The budget devoted for the period 2021–24 is CHF 4.4 million.

== Diplomatic representation ==
- Colombia has an embassy in Bern.
- Switzerland has an embassy in Bogotá.

== See also ==
- Foreign relations of Colombia
- Foreign relations of Switzerland
