= Azerbaijan–Switzerland relations =

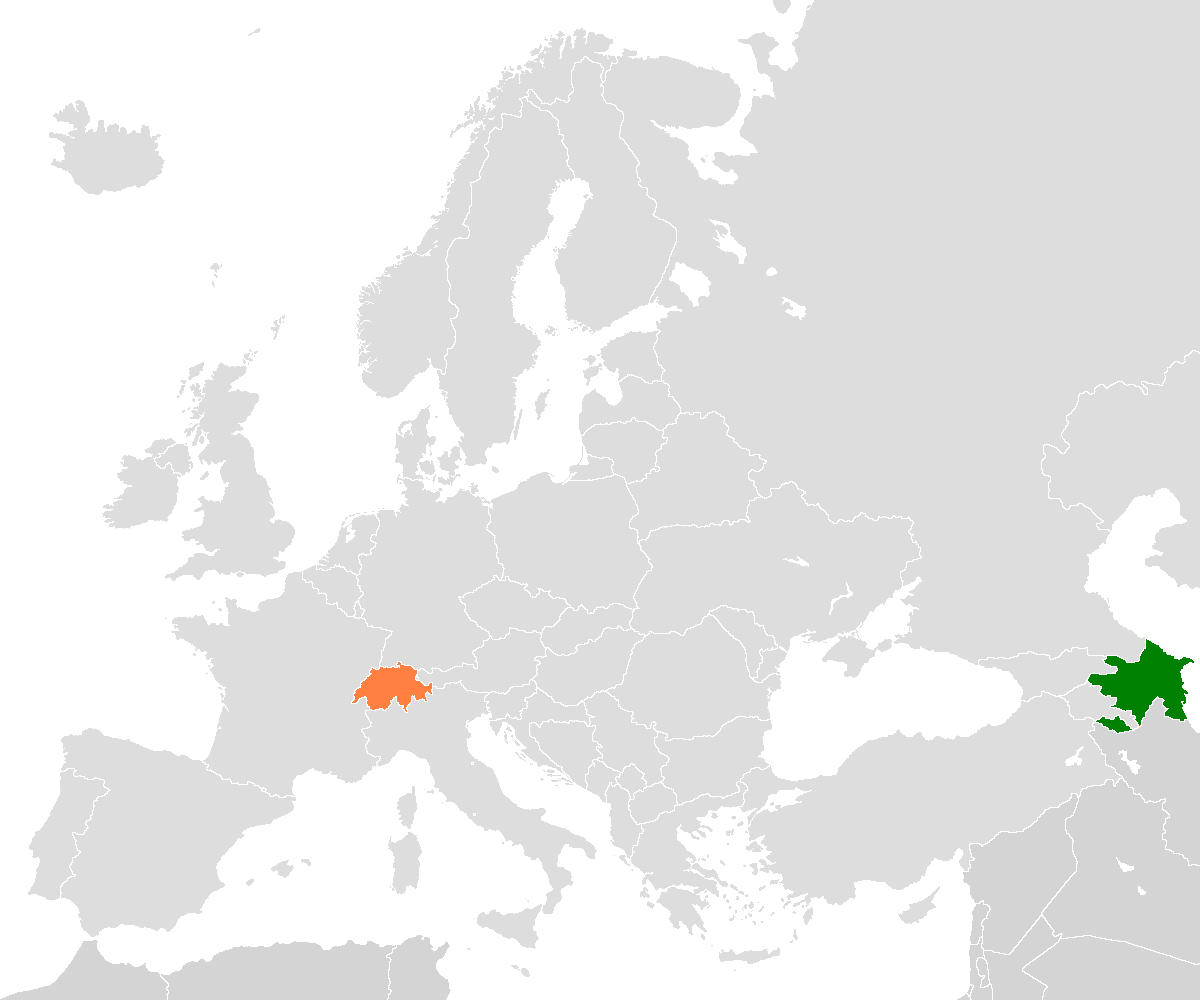

- Azerbaijan: Switzerland

Diplomatic mission
- Embassy of Azerbaijan, Bern: Embassy of Switzerland, Baku

Envoy
- Ambassador Fuad Isgandarov: Ambassador Thomas Stähli

Foreign relations exist between Azerbaijan and Switzerland. Azerbaijan has an embassy in Bern and Switzerland has one in Baku. Both countries are full members of the Council of Europe and the Organization for Security and Co-operation in Europe (OSCE).

== Economic cooperation ==
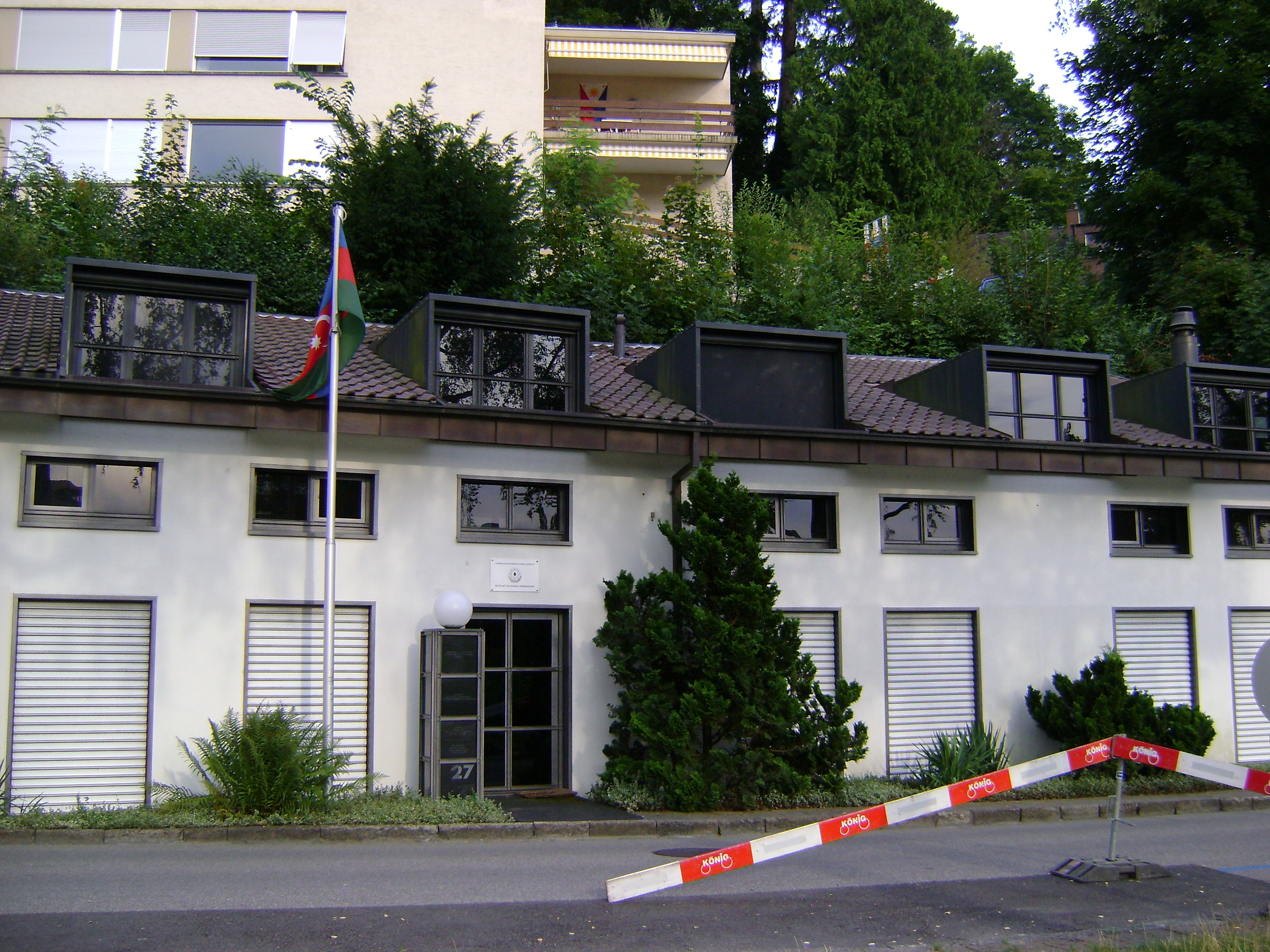
Embassy of Azerbaijan in Bern

In November 1998, delegates of the two countries met and agreed to expand economic relations and the Swiss Government agreed to give a $US 50 million credit to Azerbaijan.

Switzerland considers Azerbaijan an important country for economic development cooperation according to the Swiss State Secretariat for Economic Affairs The Azeri president has stressed the importance of the ties between the two nations. An intergovernmental agreement on trade and economic cooperation was signed in Baku in October 2000.

The Swiss Foreign Affairs minister met the Azeri President in February 2006, where the two stressed the importance of their relationship. During this visit, the focus was primarily on economic cooperation, however, the minister raised the issue of Azerbaijan's conflict with Armenia. This was followed by a visit by the Swiss Energy Minister in October 2007, after which an energy agreement was signed.

Further emphasis was placed on the relationship and further development made in a visit by the Swiss foreign affairs minister to Baku in May 2009, where his Azeri counterpart said his country placed "great importance to boosting cooperation with Switzerland" and expressed hopes of deepening the existing bilateral ties.

== European Union ==
Switzerland has had a role in developing relations between Azerbaijan and the European Union, with Swiss officials advocating closer ties between the EU and Azerbaijan in order to provide energy security for Europe. Switzerland has also provided 'neutral ground' for Azeri officials to meet with delegates of Western organisations and governments.

== Diplomacy ==
Republic of Azerbaijan

- Bern (Embassy)

Republic of Switzerland

- Baku (Embassy)

== See also ==
- Foreign relations of Azerbaijan
- Foreign relations of Switzerland
- Azerbaijanis in Switzerland
- Azerbaijanis in Europe
- Swisses in Azerbaijan
