= Switzerland–United Arab Emirates relations =

- Switzerland: United Arab Emirates

Switzerland and the United Arab Emirates established diplomatic relations on 12 September 1973.

== Trade ==
The UAE is a significant exporter of gold to Switzerland, having exported 316 tonnes from January to September 2025 at a value of CHF 27 billion. A large portion of this gold is illegally mined and smuggled from Africa to the UAE.

== Military relations ==
In 2009, Switzerland approved the sale of 25 Pilatus PC-21 aircraft to the UAE Armed Forces. Swiss arms exports to the UAE amounted to CHF 133 million in 2012; the UAE was Switzerland's second-largest arms export destination behind Germany.

== Diplomatic missions ==
- Switzerland has an embassy in Abu Dhabi and a consulate-general in Dubai.
- The UAE has an embassy in Bern.
