= Croatia–Switzerland relations =

- Croatia: Switzerland

Croatia–Switzerland relations are foreign relations between Croatia and Switzerland. Switzerland has an embassy established in Zagreb, while Croatia has an embassy established in Bern.

As of 2012, Croatia and Switzerland had signed over two dozen treaties together, relating to diplomatic relations and economic ties.

== History ==
In 1920, the first Swiss consulate was established in Zagreb, serving as the consulate general for the Kingdom of Yugoslavia, and later, the Socialist Federal Republic of Yugoslavia. At the time, approximately 200 Swiss people lived in Croatia.

During World War II, Switzerland refused to recognize the Independent State of Croatia, the Nazi puppet state controlled by the Ustaše. This was due both to Switzerland's policy of neutrality, as well as due to British diplomatic pressure. However, Switzerland maintained de jure economic relations with the Independent State of Croatia by allowing them to conduct limited consular activities within the Permanent Trade Delegation in Zurich. An additional agreement was signed in 1944. In 1945, the Federal Council of Switzerland voted to block Croatian trade.

Following Croatian independence in October 1991, formal relations were established in January 1992. They established an embassy the same year. During the Croatian War of Independence, Switzerland provided 52 million Swiss francs worth of humanitarian aid, and after the war, aided in the reconstruction efforts.

In 1995, Croatia established a consulate general in Zurich.

As of 2001, 384 Swiss people lived in Croatia, while 43,608 Croats lived in Switzerland. As of 2024, 1,841 Swiss people lived in Croatia.

== Economy ==
In 2000, bilateral trade between Croatia and Switzerland accounted for 130 million Swiss francs, which was primarily made up of Swiss exports to Croatia. Wood, furniture, textiles, and agricultural products made up the majority of the good exported.

In 2024, bilateral trade between Croatia and Switzerland accounted for 746 million Swiss francs, which entailed 398 in Swiss million exports to Croatia and 347 million in Croatian exports to Switzerland. Switzerland mainly exports pharmaceutical products and machinery, and mainly imports metal products, machinery, and agricultural and forestry products.

In 2025, Croatian nationals accounted for about 2% of immigration in European countries, with workers primarily employed in the fields of industry, health and social services, retail, and construction. Croatian labor plays a stable role in many sectors of the Swiss economy.

In 2017, Croatia and Switzerland signed the Agreement on the Free Movement of Persons, which regarded work visas. It set a permit quota for Croatian nationals. In November 2025, a transitional period was established, set to end on 31 December 2026. In January 2026, the permit quota was abolished for Croatian nationals, which was the first step to giving them full freedom of movement within the country.

== Resident diplomatic missions ==
- Croatia has an embassy in Bern and a consulate-general in Zurich.
- Switzerland has an embassy in Zagreb.

== See also ==
- Foreign relations of Croatia
- Foreign relations of Switzerland
- Croats in Switzerland
- Switzerland–Yugoslavia relations
