= Spain–Switzerland relations =

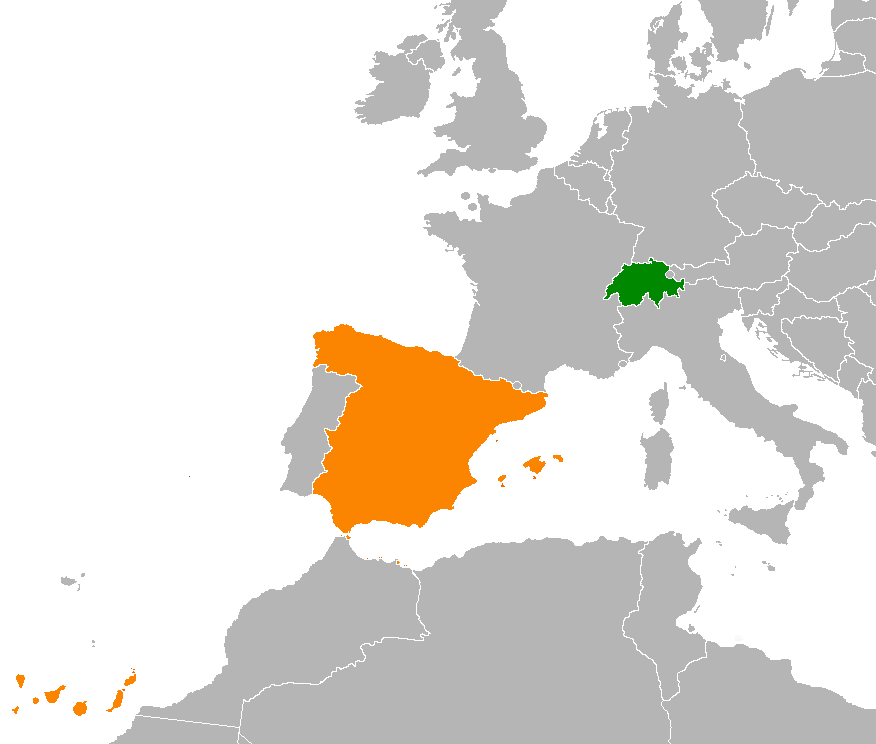
- Spain: Switzerland

Spain and Switzerland maintain bilateral and diplomatic relations, and both countries are members of the Council of Europe.

== Bilateral relations ==
Bilateral relations are excellent and there is no contentious dispute between the two countries but, on the contrary, a constructive political dialogue and good cooperation on issues of mutual interest.

Especially as a result of Spanish emigration to Switzerland of 1960s and 1970s and of a new rebound as of 2010, at the end of 2014, according to the census of nationals of the Consulates General of Spain in Switzerland 115,718 Spaniards (+4,096 compared to 2013), among which there are about 34,500 that, for personal and family reasons, they enjoy dual nationality in fact.

This large community is perfectly integrated in the country and, although inferior in number to that existing in Swiss territory in the 1970s (which reached 200,000 people), it is among the first 7 or 8 foreign minorities resident in the Confederation.

According to the official Swiss census, at the end of December 2014 there were 81,868 Spaniards in Switzerland (+3,711 compared to 2013), of which 26.5% were born in Switzerland. These figures do not include people with dual citizenship. Conversely, at the end of 2014 there were 24,474 (+232 compared to 2013) Swiss citizens in Spain, of whom 13,670 had dual citizenship.

In 2009, the political consultations held annually at the level of Minister of Foreign Affairs were institutionalized.

== Economic relations ==
Spain and Switzerland are partners of the first magnitude:

- From the Spanish point of view: Switzerland is our 10th customer (8th European) and our 25th worldwide supplier (11th European).
- From the Swiss perspective, Spain is its 10th worldwide customer (and 5th in Europe), absorbing 2.6% of total Swiss exports. On the other hand, Spain is the 10th largest supplier of Switzerland (8th European).

=== Trade balance ===
Trade between Spain and Switzerland, as recorded in the trade balance when it is drawn from the data of customs, which is unavoidable because neither the Bank of Spain nor the Swiss National Bank publish balance-of-payments data broken down by countries, traditionally reflecting an imbalance against Spain that materializes at a coverage rate of around 60%.

According to Spanish and European sources, in recent years the bilateral trade balance has evolved in a very positive way for Spain: from a deficit coverage index it has been passed to a trade balance with a surplus and in 2014 the coverage rate reached 126% Swiss sources place this rate at 100%.

== Resident diplomatic missions ==
- Spain has an embassy and consulate-general in Bern and consulates-general in Geneva and Zürich.
- Switzerland has an embassy in Madrid and a consulate-general in Barcelona.
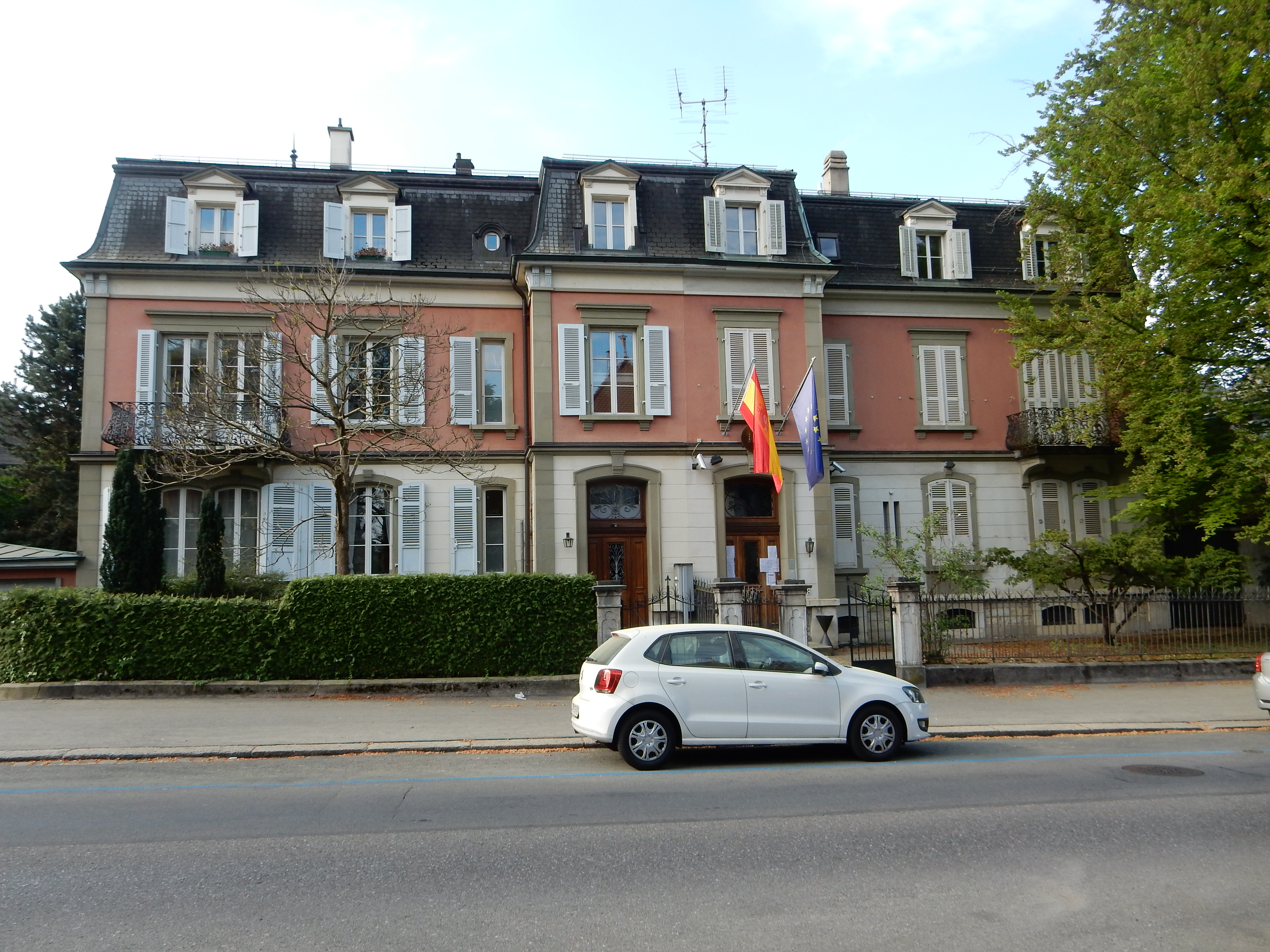
Consulate-General of Spain in Bern

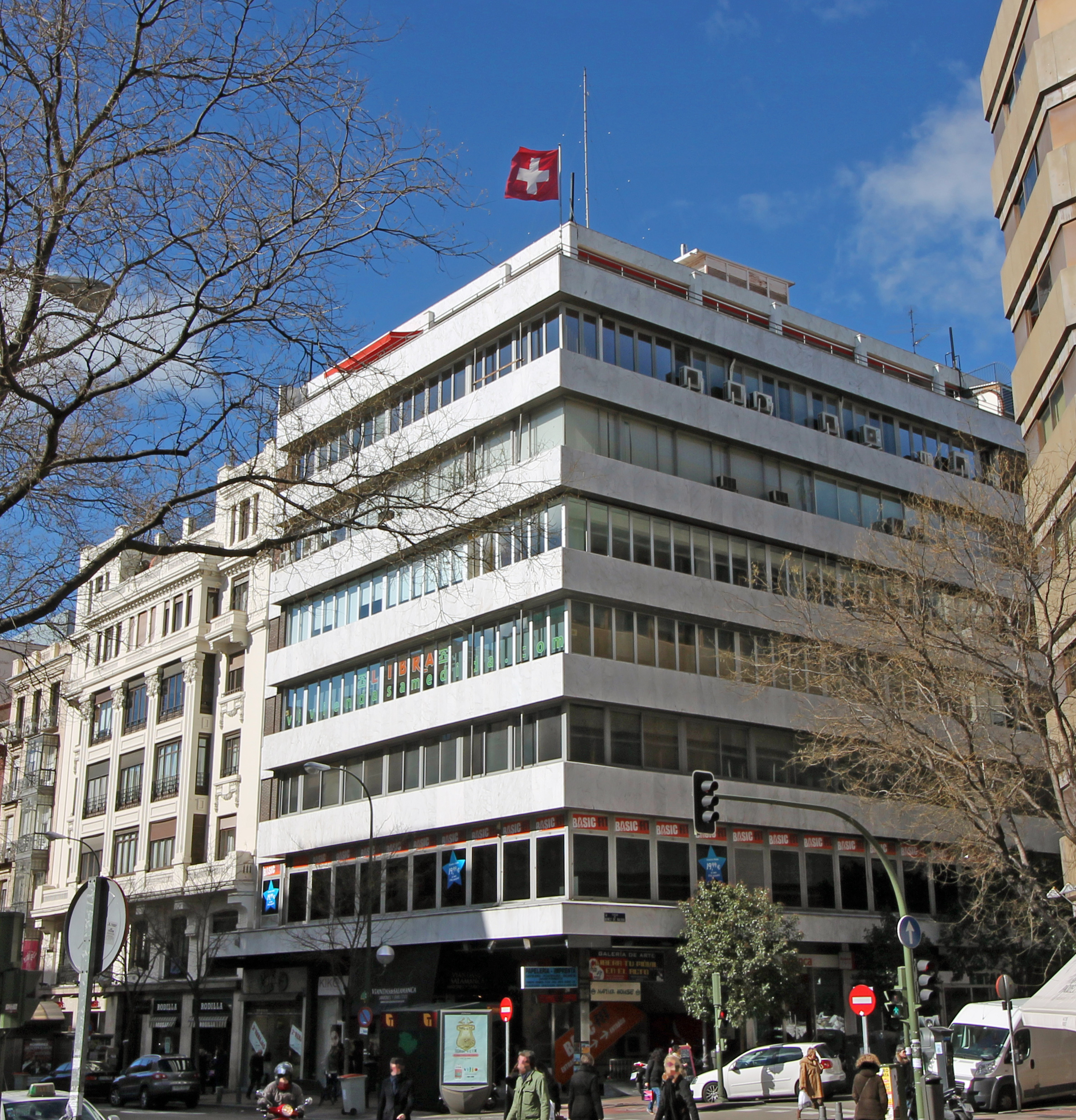
Embassy of Switzerland in Madrid

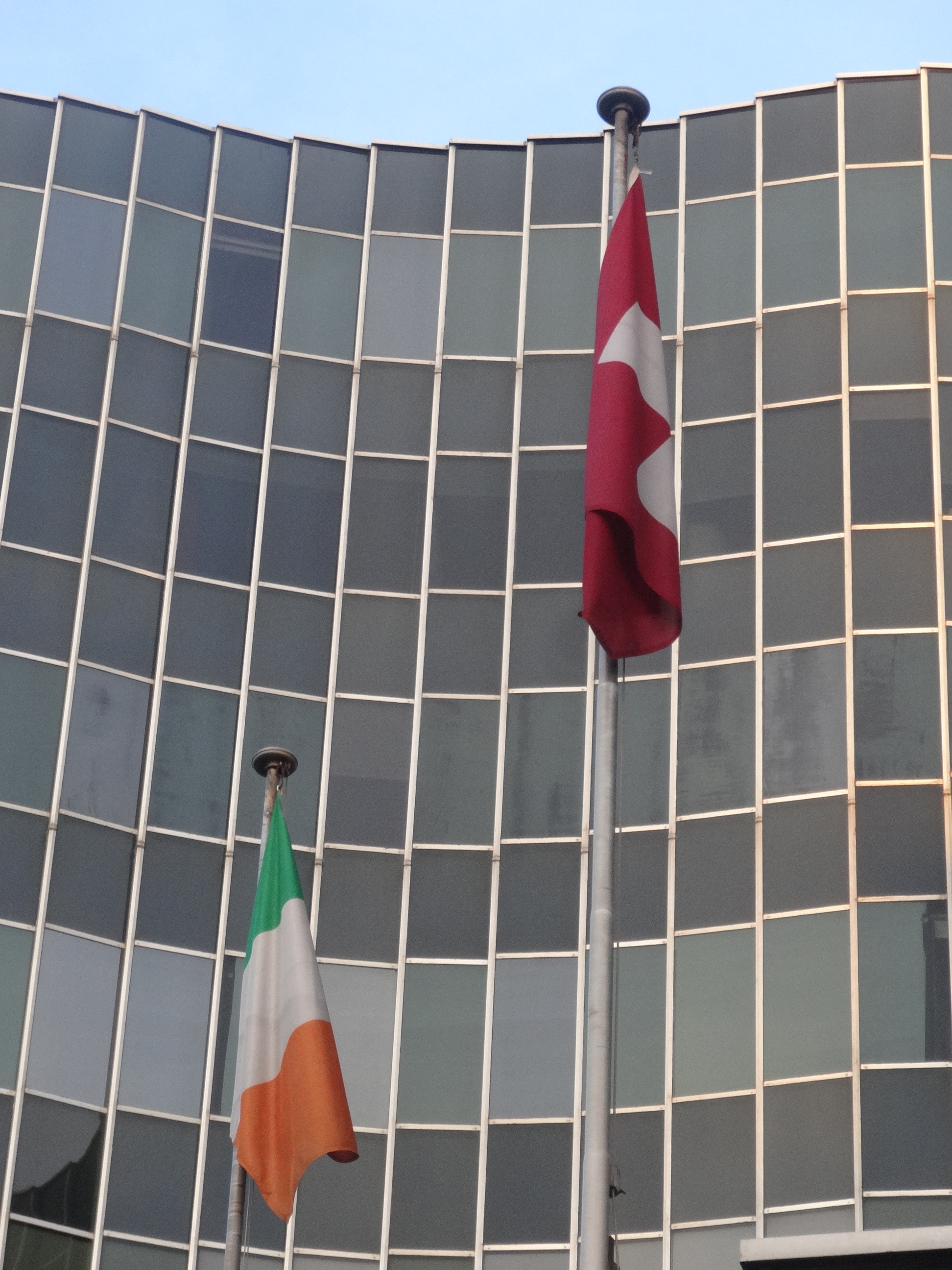
Building hosting the Consulate-General of Switzerland in Barcelona

== See also ==
- Foreign relations of Spain
- Foreign relations of Switzerland
- Switzerland–EU relations

== Bibliography ==
- RODRIGUEZ, Mari Carmen, 1936–1939 : La Suisse face aux " deux Espagnes ", un cas d’étude des relations internationales de la Suisse au XXe siècle (tesina inédita), Universidad de Lausana, 2001.
- PERRENOUD, Marc. Banques et diplomatie suisses à la fin de la Deuxième Guerre mondiale, politique de neutralité et relations financières internationales, Berna, Etudes et Sources 13–14, AFB, 1987/8, p. 13.
- Carta del BNS al DPF, 12 July 1943 en un informe del 22 January 1946, AFB, E 6100 A 25/2331. Véase PERRENOUD, Marc. Banques...op. cit., p. 14.
- VIÑAS, Ángel, VIÑUELA, J., EGUIDAZU, F., FERNÁNDEZ PULGAR, C., y FLORENSA, S., Política commercial exterior en España (1931–1975), Madrid, Banco Exterior de España, 1979.
- Véase reunión del Comité del IEME, Madrid, 14 March 1969, in ABE, IEME, Secretaría, caja 406.
