= Indonesia–Switzerland relations =

- Indonesia: Switzerland

Indonesia and Switzerland established diplomatic relations in 1951. In 2010, the heads of state of the two nations agreed to launch negotiations on a Comprehensive Economic Partnership Agreement (CEPA). Switzerland has named Indonesia as one of seven priority countries for economic development cooperation. Indonesia has an embassy in Bern, while Switzerland has an embassy in Jakarta, also accredited for East Timor and ASEAN.

== History ==
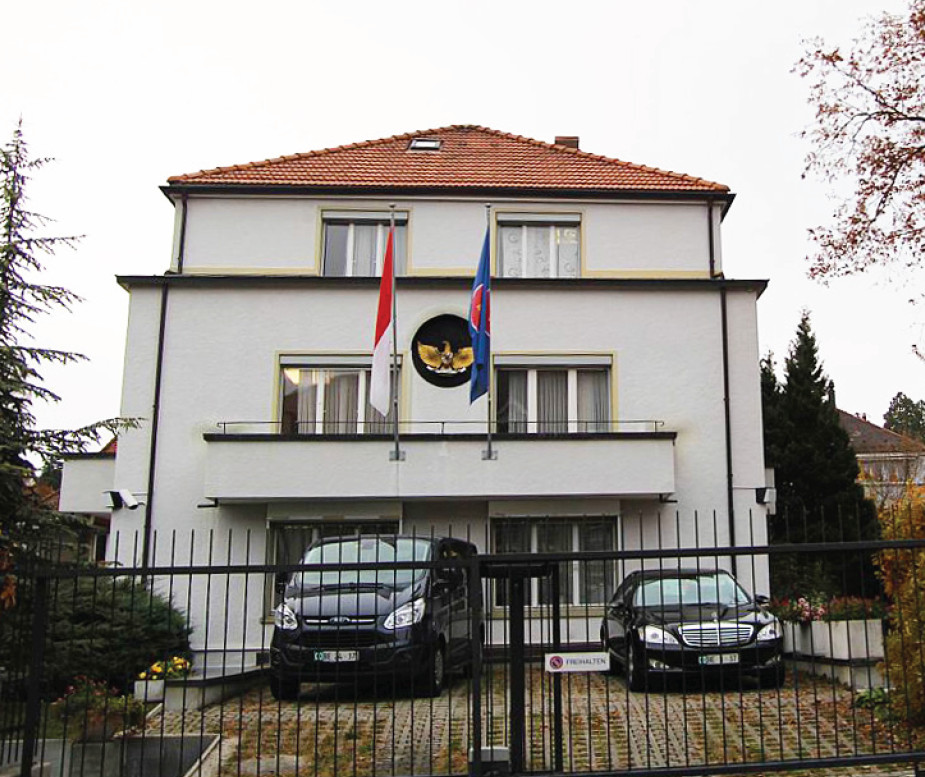
Embassy of Indonesia in Bern

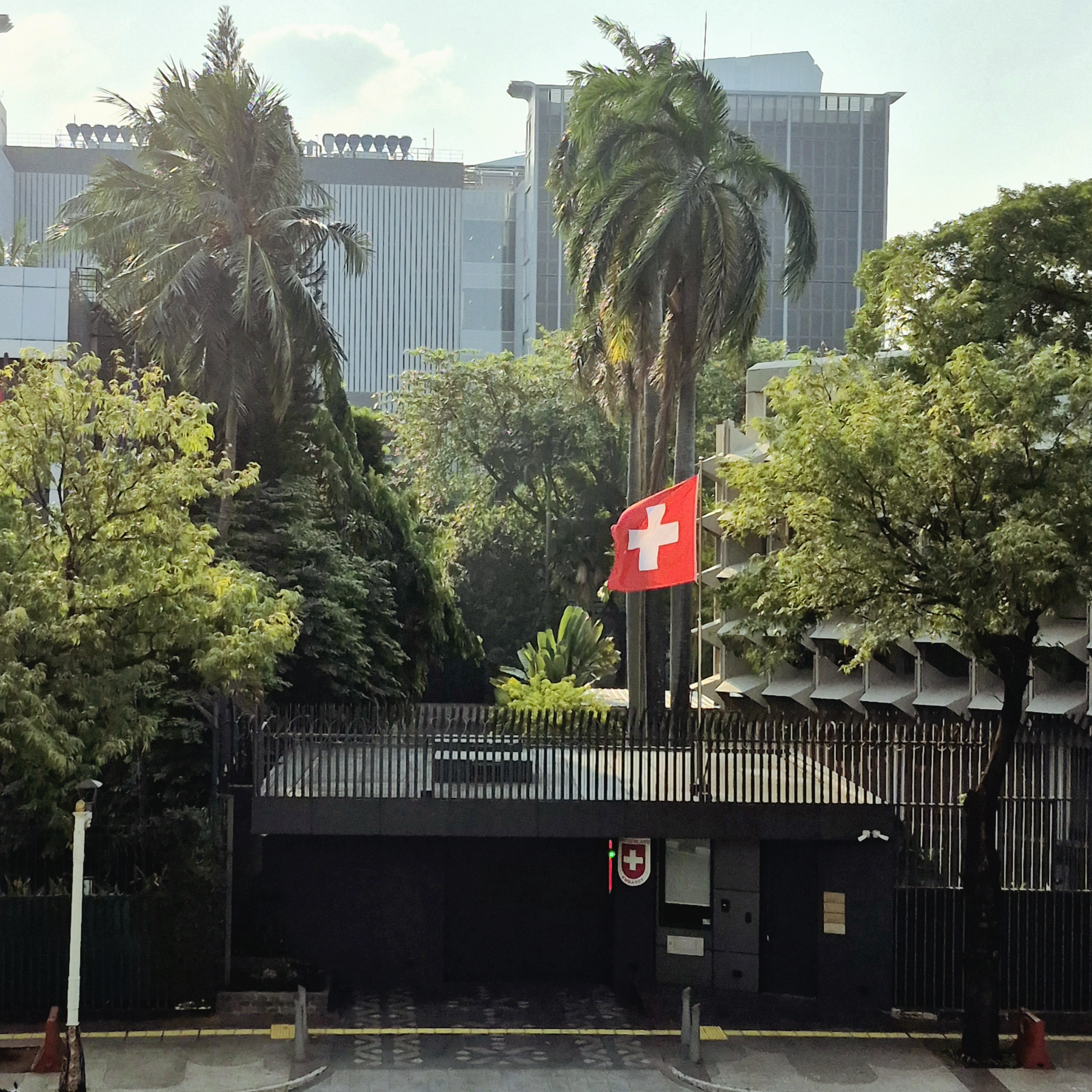
Embassy of Switzerland in Jakarta

Historical links between Switzerland and Indonesia began in the 17th century as numbers of Swiss nationals began to migrate and settle in the Dutch East Indies. In 1863, a Swiss consulate was established in Batavia (today Jakarta), followed by a second Swiss consulate in Medan.

After the Indonesian National Revolution, Switzerland promptly recognized the nascent Indonesian republic in 1949. Bilateral relations between both nations were officially established on 2 November 1951, marked with establishment of the Swiss embassy in Jakarta. Switzerland is among the countries that provided aid during the aftermath of the 2004 Indian Ocean tsunami And Earthquake that devastated Banda Aceh, the May 2006 Yogyakarta earthquake, and the September 2009 Sumatra earthquakes. Today, the relations between the two nations have expanded in scope from economy, trade and investments, to tourism, education and culture.

== Trade and investments ==
The value of bilateral trade between the nations in 2013 is US$260 million. In 2011, trade balance between Indonesia and Switzerland was in favour to Switzerland, that recorded 277.1 million Swiss francs (US$299.077 million) trade surplus. Indonesia's export to Switzerland stood at 162.6 million Swiss francs (US$175.48 million), mostly consists of textiles, garments, and footwear, while Swiss' export to Indonesia are mostly industrial machinery, valued 439.7 million Swiss francs (US$474.568 million).

In 2010, Swiss direct investment in Indonesia reached 7 billion Swiss francs (US$7.55 billion), most of them invested by Swiss corporates operating in Indonesia. Currently there are around 70 Swiss companies operate in Indonesia, employing around 45,000 workers. Swiss corporates in Indonesia dominate the food, pharmaceutical, agricultural biotechnology, banking and insurance sectors. For example, Nestlé is among the dominant food company in Indonesia and operates three factories in the country.

== Education and culture ==
On 6 December 1973, the Indonesian and Swiss governments signed an agreement to establish Polytechnic for Mechanics within the Bandung Institute of Technology at Bandung. Today, the Swiss Mechanics Polytechnic has transformed into Bandung State Polytechnic for Manufacture.

== See also ==
- Foreign relations of Indonesia
- Foreign relations of Switzerland
