= Romania–Switzerland relations =

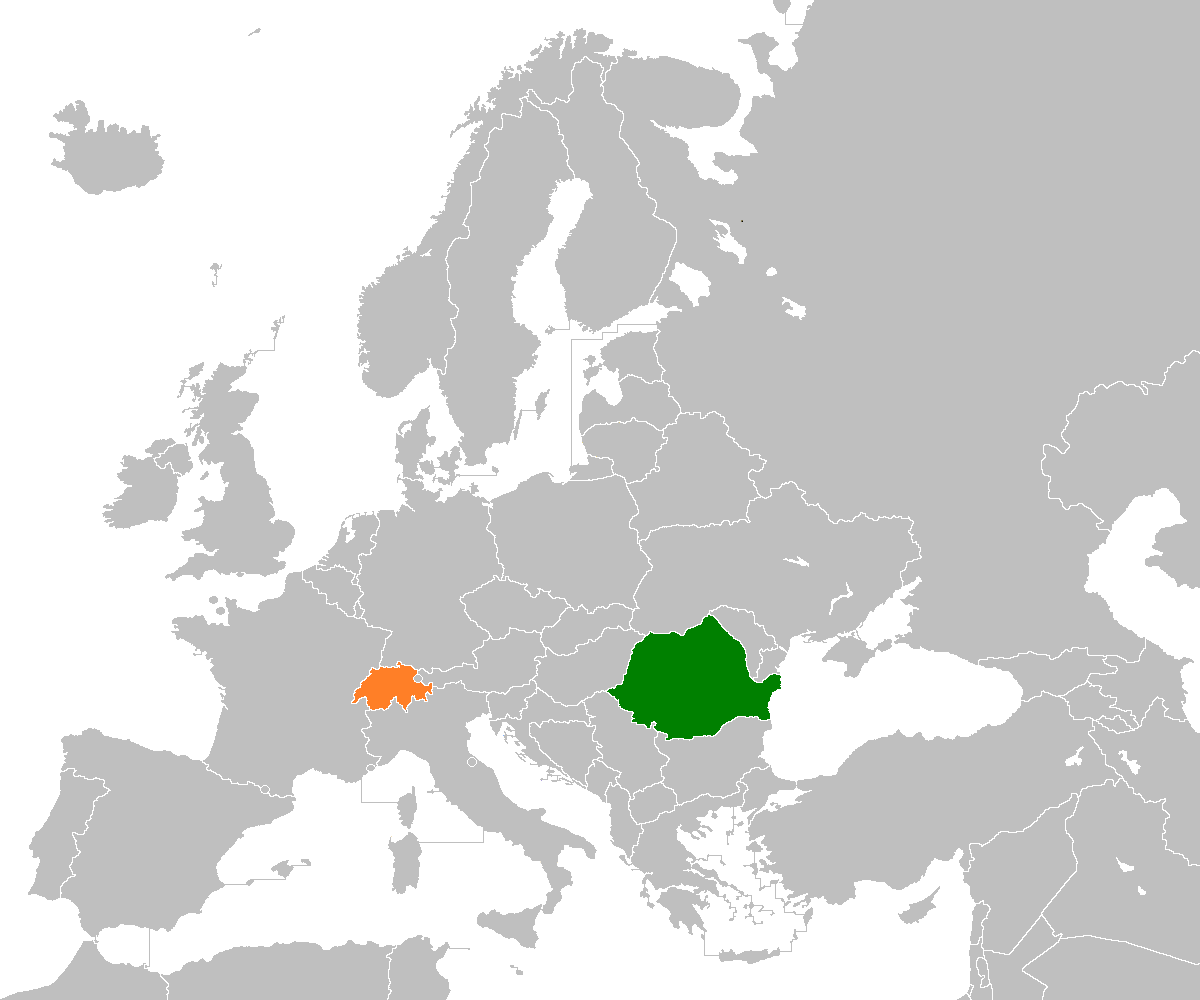
- Romania: Switzerland

Romania–Switzerland relations are the foreign relations between Romania and Switzerland. The diplomatic relations between both countries were established in 1911, first at legacy level and subsequently raised to embassy level on 24 December 1962. Romania has an embassy in Bern and two consulates in Geneva and Zürich, while Switzerland has an embassy in Bucharest. The Romanian embassy at Bern was once seized in 1955 by a group of five Romanian emigrants. This event is known in Romania as the "Bern incident".

Since the 1990s, Switzerland has helped Romania financially, for a total sum of 140 million Swiss francs between 1996 and 2006, and an additional 23 million francs in 2006−2007. Switzerland has become the 12th largest foreign investor in Romania. In 2005, Romania exported goods to Switzerland for a total of 206 million Swiss francs, with Switzerland exporting for 547 million Swiss francs to Romania, making Romania the biggest partner of Switzerland in Southeastern Europe. By 2006, this had increased by 26% from Romania and 38% from Switzerland.

With the entrance of Romania into the European Union (EU), Switzerland increased its monetary aid to Romania to 181 million Swiss francs. Imports and exports increased massively, with Swiss exports reaching 490 million francs in the first quarter of 2008 alone, nearly the total for the full year of 2005. Imports from Romania to Switzerland reached 109 million in the same quarter. Swiss investment in Romania is visible in the more than 120 Swiss companies in the country, with have more than 10,000 employees in total.

Plans to build a combined Swiss-Austrian prison in Romania to detain Romanian criminals from both countries was put on hold in 2004. Switzerland only had 28 prisoners with the Romanian nationality in 2003, which made it into a low-priority solution, said the then leader of the Federal Department of Justice and Police Christoph Blocher.

== Resident diplomatic missions ==
- Romania has an embassy in Bern.
- Switzerland has an embassy in Bucharest.

== See also ==
- Foreign relations of Romania
- Foreign relations of Switzerland
- Switzerland–EU relations
