= North Korea–Switzerland relations =

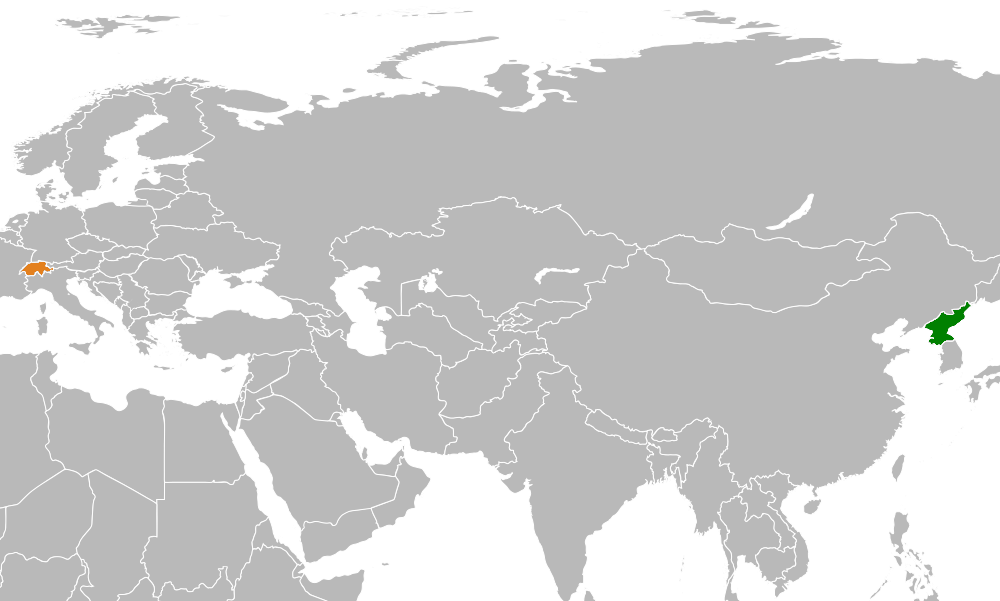

- North Korea: Switzerland

North Korea–Switzerland relations (Korean: 스위스-조선민주주의 인민공화국 관계) are the foreign relations between North Korea and Switzerland. Switzerland has a cooperation office in the Taedong River District of Pyongyang, North Korea, while official diplomatic duties are performed by the Swiss embassy in Beijing, China. North Korea has an embassy in Bern.

== History ==
Switzerland was a member of the Neutral Nations Supervisory Commission in the Korean Demilitarized Zone (DMZ) upon the end of the Korean War (1950–1953). The two countries have had diplomatic relations since 1974. Additionally, Switzerland has long been a mediator party in talks between the involved parties of the conflict in the Korean peninsula (North Korea, South Korea, China, Japan, Russia, and the United States), most recently with the 2017–18 North Korea crisis. Then Swiss president Doris Leuthard identified her country as being able to host such talks again in September 2017.

North Korean supreme leader Kim Jong Un is believed to have attended boarding school at the Liebefeld-Steinhölzli school in Bern during the late 1990s, having been registered under a pseudonym.

== Embassies ==
North Korea maintains an embassy in the Swiss capital Bern. Switzerland does not have an embassy in the North Korean capital Pyongyang; official diplomatic duties are carried out by the Swiss embassy in the Chinese capital Beijing. However, Switzerland does have a diplomatic office in Pyongyang's Taedong River District. The office was closed in 2020 during the COVID-19 pandemic in North Korea, but it was reopened in October 2026.

== Trade ==
Trade between North Korean and Switzerland is at a "modest scale". North Korea's main export to Switzerland is raw plastic sheeting, while Switzerland's to North Korea is concentrated milk.
