= 2002 Swiss referendums =

Eight referendums were held in Switzerland during 2002. The first two were held on 3 March on popular initiatives for Switzerland to join the United Nations and to reduce working hours. UN membership was approved, whilst the shorter working hours proposal was rejected. The next two were held on 2 June on amending the penal code regarding abortion, which was approved, and a popular initiative "for mother and child", which was rejected.

The next set referendums was held on 22 September, with a popular initiative on adding surplus gold reserves to the country's pension fund and a counter-proposal, as well as a federal law on the electricity market. All three were rejected. The final two referendums were held on 24 November on a popular initiative "against misuse of asylum rights" and a federal law on compulsory unemployment insurance and compensation for insolvencies. The asylum proposal was rejected, whilst the federal law was approved.

== Results ==
Month	Question	For		Against		Blank/invalid		Total	Registered voters	Turnout	Cantons for		Cantons against	
Month	Question	Votes	%	Votes	%	Blank	Invalid	Total	Registered voters	Turnout	Full	Half	Full	Half
March	United Nations membership	1,489,110	54.6	1,237,629	45.4	20,386	11,800	2,758,925	4,721,422	58.4	11	2	9	4
March	Reducing working hours	686,935	25.4	2,021,198	74.6	30,981	11,665	2,750,779	4,721,422	58.3	0	0	20	6
June	Strafgesetzbuch amendment on abortion	1,399,545	72.2	540,105	27.8	30,008	8,465	1,978,123	4,730,594	41.8				
June	Popular initiative "for mother and child"	352,432	18.2	1,578,870	81.8	32,912	8,382	1,972,596	4,730,594	41.7	0	0	20	6
September	Surplus gold reserves into pension fund^{[a]}	984,058	46.4	1,085,072	51.1	10,997	9,663	2,143,027	4,744,197	45.2	6	0	14	6
September	Counter-proposal on gold reserves^{[a]}	984,537	46.4	1,057,398	49.8	10,997	9,663	2,143,027	4,744,197	49.8	6	1	14	5
September	Electricity market law	972,770	47.4	1,078,412	52.6	62,974	11,058	2,125,214	4,744,197	44.8				
November	Popular initiative on asylum	1,119,342	49.9	1,123,550	50.1	23,749	9,941	2,276,582	4,749,994	47.9				
November	Federal law on unemployment insurance	1,234,793	56.1	966,430	43.9	50,879	10,019	2,262,121	4,749,994	47.6				
Source: Nohlen & Stöver

^{a} In the referendum with the counter-proposal voters could also give no answer. For the main question 53,237 voters (2.5%) did not answer, whilst for the counter-proposal 80,432 (3.8%) did not answer.
