= African immigrants to Switzerland =

Total population
- 73,553 (foreigners)

Languages
- English, German, French, Italian, Gujarati, Telugu

Religion
- Christianity · Islam · Indigenous religions

African immigrants to Switzerland include Swiss residents, both Swiss citizens and foreign nationals, who have migrated to Switzerland from Africa. The number has quintupled over the period of 1980 to 2007, with an average growth rate of 6% per annum (doubling time 12 years). According to official Swiss population statistics, 73,553 foreigners with African nationality lived in Switzerland as of 2009 (0.9% of total population, or 4.3% of resident foreigners — this data excludes immigrants with African ancestry coming from other parts of the world: (Dominican Republic and Brazil). Since the census records nationality, not ethnic origin, there is no official estimate of the number of naturalized Swiss citizens from Africa.

== Demographics ==
Of the 73,553 African nationals recorded in 2007, 78% were considered permanent residents in Switzerland (including recognized refugees, accounting for about 8%), while the remaining 22% were asylum seekers.

Permanent residents with African nationalities, organized by region of origin:

year	1980	1990	2000	2009
North Africa	6,205	10,905	15,469	20,415
East Africa	1,597	3,137	7,111	12,636
Central Africa	860	3,044	7,409	11,976
West Africa	1,390	2,601	6,488	10,842
Southern Africa	487	604	1,141	1,835
total	10,539	20,291	37,618	57,704

The largest group of residents of North African origin are from Tunisia. The above-average increase of residents from Central Africa is due to immigration from Angola, Cameroon and Congo (Brazzaville). Unofficial estimates exist for a number of African nations. For example, an estimated 1,500 people of Cape Verdean descent lived in Switzerland as of 1995.

Zentrum für Migrationskirchen (literally: Centre for migration churches) comprises eight Protestant churches from four continents, situated in the former church hall of the Evangelical Reformed Church of the Canton of Zürich in Zürich-Wipkingen, being a unique centre in Switzerland for the so-called migration churches, among them one community from Nigeria and one church from the Republic of Congo.

== Asylum seekers ==
A third of Africans residing in Switzerland are asylum seekers. An additional unknown number have stayed in Switzerland as sans papiers after they were refused asylum.

There was a steep surge of asylum requests from Eritrea and Nigerians in 2009. In April 2010, the director of the Federal Office for Migration (BFM), Alard du Bois-Reymond, issued a statement on the large number of unfounded requests for asylum by nationals of Nigeria in particular. Du Bois-Reymond said that 99.5% of asylum seekers of Nigerian origin were criminals abusing the asylum system, entering Switzerland with the intention of pursuing petty crime and drug dealing. The Nigerian ambassador to Switzerland, Martin Ihoeghian Uhomoibhi, objected to du Boi-Reymond's statement as an undue generalization.

The question of repatriation is regularly raised in Swiss politics in the context of immigrant criminality, e.g. in the case of a crime wave that was led mainly by Algerians in Geneva's Pâquis district, or in the case of Nigerian organized crime on a nationwide scale. Switzerland has several repatriation agreements with African states, with Algeria since 2006, which has however been stalled due to a refusal to ratify additional protocols on the part of Algeria.

Switzerland has signed a technical agreement on re-admittance in the case of repatriation of rejected asylum seekers with four African countries, Guinea, Democratic Republic of Congo, Eritrea and Sierra Leone. There is also a repatriation agreement with Nigeria, but this was suspended by Nigeria following the death of a Nigerian citizen during forced repatriation in March 2010. In 2001, Samson Chukwu, a Nigerian asylum seeker, was killed in police custody by asphyxiation after a police officer kneeled on his back.

== Discrimination ==
African immigrants face systemic racism in Switzerland. 52% of West Africans have experienced racism in the country.

== Notable people ==
Notable Swiss people of African origin are found mostly in sports, especially football, including José Gonçalves, Gelson Fernandes, Gilberto Reis, Oumar Kondé, Bruce Lalombongo, Enes Fermino, Badile Lubamba, Hervé Makuka, Mobulu M'Futi, Ugor Nganga, Blaise Nkufo, Cédric Tsimba, Johan Djourou, Owusu Benson, Richmond Rak, Kim Jaggy, Breel Embolo, Manuel Akanji, Aurélie Csillag, Leila Wandeler, Sydney Schertenleib, Ella Touon, Coumba Sow, Alayah Pilgrim and Lydia Andrade. The only Swiss basketball players ever to play in the NBA include Clint Capela and Thabo Sefolosha, who are both of African descent. In music, notable Swiss persons include Manon Bannerman, Negatif, Dezmond Dez, M.A.M, Dynamike, Mark Sway, Fabienne Louve.

Ricardo Lumengo, originally of Angola, was the second black politician to be elected to the Swiss National Council (2007 Swiss federal election). Mandy Abou Shoak, whose family immigrated from Sudan, is a politician for the Social Democratic Party and a human rights activist. She has been a member of the Cantonal Council of Zurich since 2023.

== See also ==
- Immigration to Switzerland
- Immigration to Europe
- Afro-European
- Eritreans in Switzerland
