= State Secretariat for Migration (Switzerland) =

Swiss federal office

State Secretariat for Migration (SEM)
- (in German) Staatssekretariat für Migration SEM (in French) Secrétariat d’Etat aux migrations SEM (in Italian) Segreteria di Stato della migrazione SEM

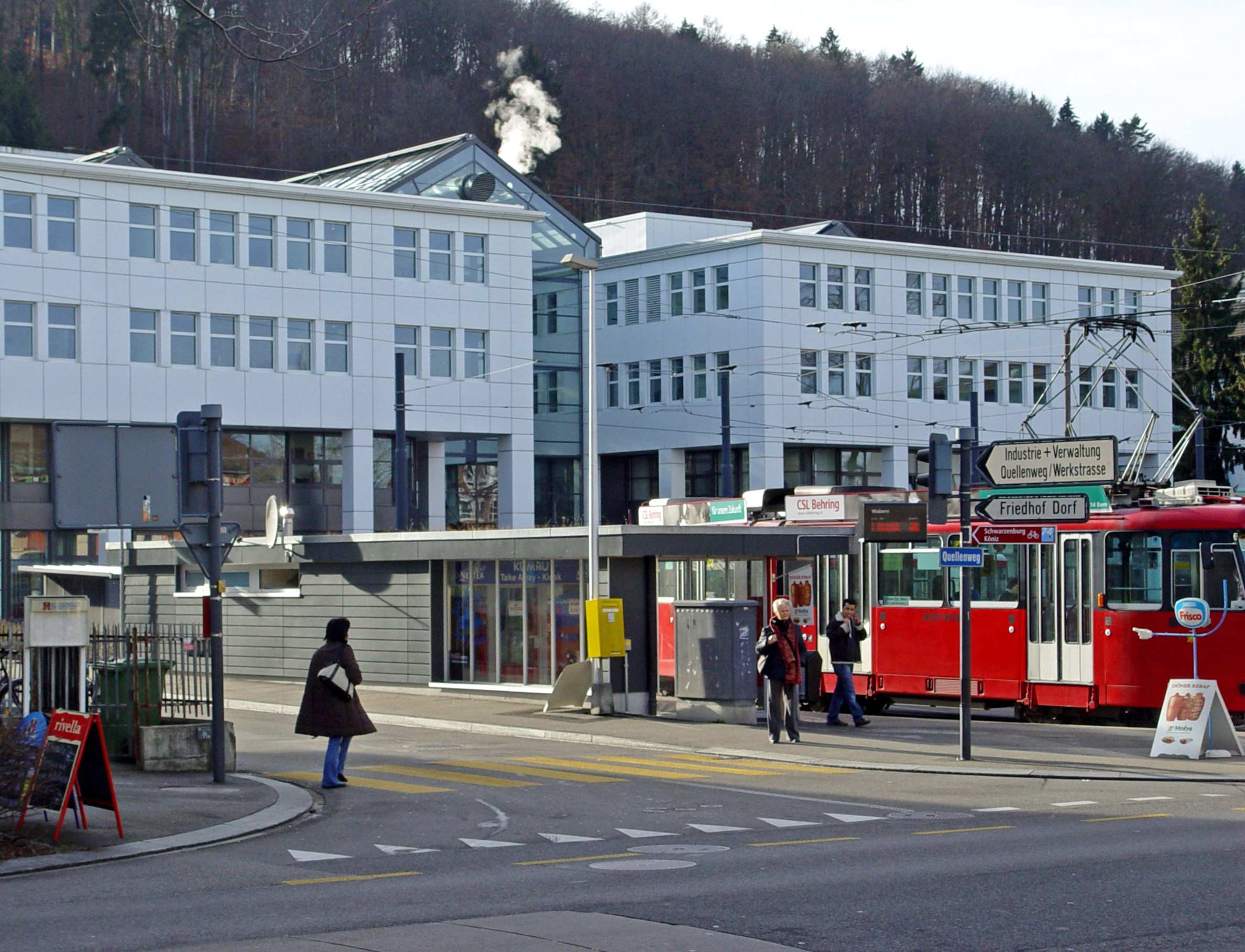
- Building of the State Secretariat for Migration in Bern (2008)

Agency overview
- Formed: 2005; 21 years ago (merger of several federal offices)
- Jurisdiction: Switzerland
- Headquarters: Wabern (Köniz), Switzerland
- Employees: 1300
- Annual budget: Expenditure: CHF 1.6 billion (2022)
- Minister responsible: Beat Jans
- Agency executive: Christine Schraner Burgener (State secretary)
- Website: sem.admin.ch

The State Secretariat for Migration (SEM) (German: Staatsekretariat für Migrationen SEM, French: Secrétariat d'État aux migrations, Italian: Segreteria di Stato per le migrazioni) is a Swiss federal authority. As of 2023, it is headed by Federal Councillor Beat Jans.

It is responsible, at the federal level, for all matters relating to foreigners (granting of visas, prohibition of entry into the country, naturalization, etc.) and for the recognition of refugees (granting and withdrawal of asylum). The SEM is subordinated to the Federal Department of Justice and Police.

Until 31 December 31 2014, the authority was called the Federal Office for Migration (FOM) (German: Bundesamt für Migration BFM, French: Office fédéral des migrations ODM).

== History ==
The Federal Office for Migration (FOM) was created by the merger of the Federal Office for Immigration, Integration and Emigration (German: Bundesamt für Zuwanderung, Integration und Auswanderung (IMES), French: Office fédéral de l'immigration, de l'intégration et de l'émigration (IMES)) and the Federal Office for Refugees (German: Bundesamt für Migration (BFM), French: Office fédéral des réfugiés (ODR)). The merger was proposed by Federal Councillor Christoph Blocher and adopted by the Federal Council on 7 June 2004.

On 1 January 2015, the FOM was renamed the State Secretariat for Migration, by decision of the Federal Council of 19 September 2014, in view of the "growing importance of the FOM, whose field of activity is increasingly vast".

== Organization ==
Christine Schraner Burgener has been State Secretary since the beginning of 2022. She replaced Mario Gattiker, who had headed the agency since November 2011, initially on an interim basis. The SEM is divided into a staff department and four main departments:

- Planning and Resources;
- International Cooperation;
- Immigration and Integration;
- Asylum and Return.

The SEM has 1300 employees and an annual expenditure of about 1.6 million Swiss francs. The State Secretariat also employs experts and interpreters who translate during interviews. These are deployed as needed and are compensated for their services on a time and material basis.

=== Headquarters and branch offices ===
The headquarters of the State Secretariat is in Wabern bei Bern. In addition, six reception and processing centers (German: Empfangs- und Verfahrenszentren (EVZ)) for asylum seekers are operated, which are primarily responsible for the reception of asylum seekers at the national borders and for a summary interview on the travel route and the reasons for asylum. Since 2005, decisions on asylum applications have also been made there. The reception and procedure centers are located in Altstätten, Basel, Bern, Chiasso, Kreuzlingen and Vallorbe. In addition, the SEM maintains a department at Zurich Airport and Geneva Airport.

=== Responsibility and legal basis ===
The State Secretariat is responsible for:

1. Ensuring a Swiss-led policy on foreigners (legal basis: Foreign Nationals and Integration Act), namely:
  1. the admission and residence of foreigners in compliance with obligations under international law and taking into account humanitarian reasons and the reunification of families.
  2. the admission of foreign workers, taking into account the overall economic interests, long-term professional and social integration opportunities, and the scientific and cultural needs of Switzerland;
2. Implementation of Swiss asylum and refugee policy. The State Secretariat for Migration is responsible for the entire asylum procedure. As the investigating authority, it must establish the legally relevant facts. The procedure is governed by the Asylum Act and the Administrative Procedure Act. The Convention of 4 November 1950 for the Protection of Human Rights serves as a basis.
3. Creation of favorable conditions for the integration of the foreign population living in Switzerland and for a balanced demographic and social development.

== Full-time positions since 2007 ==
Raw data

Source: "Federal Finance Administration FFA: Data portal".

== See also ==
- Immigration to Switzerland
- Foreign Nationals and Integration Act
- Human rights in Switzerland
- Asylum Act (Switzerland)
- Asylum law in Switzerland
