= Asylum residence permits in Switzerland =

Switzerland's asylum residence permits are varied and grant very different rights. Any foreigner staying in Switzerland for more than three months must have a residence permit. On arrival in Switzerland, an asylum procedure can be opened by a simple request at an airport or border crossing. Since March 1, 2019, asylum procedures have been carried out in six areas of the country. A Federal Center for Asylum Seekers (CFA), responsible for procedural tasks, is located in each of them.

== Refugee status under Swiss law ==
"Refugees are persons who in their native country or in their country of last residence are subject to serious disadvantages or have a well-founded fear of being exposed to such disadvantages for reasons of race, religion, nationality, membership of a particular social group or due to their political opinions."

— AsylA Art.3 para. 1

In Switzerland, the Asylum Act (AsylA) defines the principles, criteria, procedure and application of decisions.

The asylum procedure determines refugee status, where the asylum seeker has the right to be heard, to make an effective appeal, etc. (a person recognized as a refugee in one European state is not necessarily recognized as such in another, because the nature of the procedures varies from one country to another).

The State Secretariat for Migration (SEM), part of the Federal Department of Justice and Police, receives asylum applications, interviews applicants and grants residence permits according to eligibility criteria.

Switzerland has been a member of the Convention Relating to the Status of Refugees since January 21, 1995; the treaty has been in force since April 21, 1955. In view of the diversification of refugee categories, the convention was supplemented by the Protocol Relating to the Status of Refugees, which came into force on October 4, 1967.

The relevance of the convention was called into question in the Council of States by Damian Müller's postulate "Adaptation of the 1951 Convention relating to the Status of Refugees". The Federal Council agreed to study the proposal and issued a report concluding that the convention was still of major importance, that it met current needs, and that a revision was not necessary. The matter was closed on June 9, 2022. The Organisation Suisse d'Aide aux Réfugiés (OSAR), which took part in drafting the report, is very pleased.

== N Permit ==
The N permit is issued to people who have applied for asylum and are awaiting the outcome of the procedure.

You must be an asylum seeker, i.e. have requested the protection of a country other than your own, and be awaiting a decision. Being an asylum seeker is a right, and the person stays legally in the country throughout the asylum procedure.

=== Rights of N Permit holders ===
This permit prohibits access to the labor market for three or even six months if the procedure has been extended since arrival on the territory (then admission according to an order of priority). Social assistance for permit holders is lower than the standard scale. Travel outside Switzerland is prohibited (except for exceptional reasons), and the individual has no choice of canton of residence (except where the principle of family unity is invoked, or with the agreement of both cantons). Naturalization is not possible. Holders of an N permit may stay a maximum of 140 days in Confederation centers before being assigned to a canton.

At the end of the asylum procedure, the rights of refugees depend on the decision taken by the State Secretariat for Migration regarding their legal status. There are various possible permits, in addition to a possible decision of refusal.

== B Permit ==
If refugee status is recognized, according to the Geneva Convention, a B permit is granted. The criteria are to be exposed to serious prejudice or fear of being exposed to serious prejudice, in particular because of one's political opinions, religion or race.

The same permit is granted to EU nationals who have found employment in Switzerland and wish to reside there. The B permit therefore allows the person in question to work in Switzerland, benefit from social assistance and have access to public services (such as schools).

However, it is not possible to vote at federal level, nor to change one's canton of residence.

After five years, the refugee can apply for a settlement permit (Permit C) if there are no grounds for revocation or downgrading, the person is integrated and has a good knowledge of the language.

== F Permit ==
If asylum is not granted, this does not necessarily mean deportation. The person can be accepted on Swiss territory on a provisional basis. This is known as an F permit.

There are two sub-categories of Permit F: either refugee status has been recognized but asylum has not been granted (see "F Permit for refugees" below), or refugee status has not been recognized, asylum has not been granted but removal of the person is not possible, lawful or reasonably required (see "Permit F for foreigners" below).

=== F Permit for refugees ===
The F refugee permit recognizes refugee status under article 3 of the Asylum Act (AsylA), but there are grounds for exclusion which rule out a person being granted asylum.

==== Grounds for exclusion from asylum ====
On the one hand, according to art. 54 of the Asylum Act, asylum cannot be granted to a person who becomes a refugee because he or she has left his or her country of origin or provenance, or because of his or her behaviour after fleeing. In other words, the danger did not exist before the person left the country; it was created by or after the person's departure.

Another reason for refusing asylum is unworthiness, as defined in art. 53 of the Asylum Act. Any person is considered unworthy of asylum if he or she has committed a reprehensible act, i.e. if the act is punishable by a custodial sentence of more than three years under the Swiss penal code. The applicant may also be considered unworthy if he or she endangers or harms state security (e.g. espionage, violent extremism, organized crime). The third case of unworthiness is if the person seeking asylum is subject to deportation.

In other words, a person who meets the conditions of art. 3 of the Asylum Act, and therefore qualifies as a refugee, but who finds himself in one of the above-mentioned situations, could still obtain an F permit for refugees.

==== Rights with F permit for refugees ====
The F permit allows you to work anywhere in Switzerland. It is renewed every 12 months.

Family regrouping is authorized, at the earliest, three years after provisional admission, but there are conditions to be met, such as suitable accommodation and financial independence. Marriage is possible.

Children may attend school. Travel abroad is possible, except to the country of origin.

It is possible to obtain a residence permit (Permit B) after five years in Switzerland. To do so, an application must be made, and certain criteria will be assessed to determine whether the permit can be granted; the criteria include level of integration, financial situation, and whether a return to the country of origin or provenance can be required.

=== F Permit for foreigners ===
The F permit for foreign nationals is a temporary admission for people who have not been granted asylum and who cannot be considered refugees.

==== Grounds for temporary admission ====
These people are subject to a removal order from Switzerland, accompanied by temporary admission to the country, if "enforcement of the removal order proves unlawful (violation of public international law), ineligible (concrete endangerment of the foreign national) or materially impossible (for technical enforcement reasons)."

In most cases, enforcement of the removal decision would put the applicant's life in danger because of war or the risk of torture, for example. In such cases, the person is considered to be in need of international protection.

==== Rights with F Permit for foreigners ====
The permit allows gainful employment throughout Switzerland. However, this permit only allows the nuclear family to reunite after three years, and only under certain conditions (housing, financial independence, etc.). Moreover, travel abroad is only authorized under very restrictive conditions. The social assistance available to these people is below the normal scale. It is possible to apply for a B permit after five years of residence in Switzerland.

In addition, people with an F permit for foreign nationals can apply for a more stable residence status by requesting for a hardship case (humanitarian B permit).

== S Permit ==
=== Eligibility criteria ===
You have to be part of a group for which collective protection is granted for the duration of a threat, such as war.

Created in 1998, in the context of migratory flows linked to the Balkan wars, this status was in fact activated for the first time in March 2022, in the context of the Ukrainian war.

At the end of March 2022, the beneficiary categories were citizens of Ukraine and their family members (classic marriage, domestic partnership and civil union), minor children, and other relatives whom they supported and who were residents in Ukraine before February 24. In spring 2022, as the granting of protection status S was based on Ukrainian nationality, other fugitives arriving in Switzerland were not entitled to it if their country of origin was considered "safe".

=== Rights of S Permit holders ===
A person granted an S permit has the right of residence for the duration of their temporary protection. They are authorized to take up gainful employment as soon as they arrive on the territory (with cantonal authorization). Children may attend school. The validity of the permit is limited to one year, but can be extended. Social assistance for permit holders is lower than the standard scale. Travel outside Switzerland is possible, as is choice of canton of residence based on friendly family ties. However, naturalization is not possible.

=== Criticisms and questions ===
In particular, organizations such as OSAR criticize that no integration measures are financed for people with protection status S. This "return-oriented" status makes integration more difficult for the people concerned.

On July 7, 2022, a new group met for the first time in Berne at the invitation of Federal Councillor Karin Keller-Sutter. Its mission was to examine the difficulties and questions raised by the S status. The majority of its members were former State Councillors and former Secretary of State Mario Gattiker.

From another point of view, a young refugee with an F permit described the difficulties of his integration process. He particularly regretted not having been able to learn his dream job. He hoped that all refugees would be treated equally.

== Federal centers for asylum seekers ==
On arrival in Switzerland, the person who applies for asylum at a border crossing is sent to a federal center for asylum seekers. They stay there for a maximum of 140 days, while a decision is made.

There are two categories of Federal Centers for Asylum Seekers (CFA): CFAs with procedural tasks, and CFAs that serve as waiting or departure centers. There is also a third category of specific centers.

CFAs with procedural tasks take applications from asylum seekers, examine them in an expedited procedure and issue asylum decisions.

CFAs without procedural tasks accommodate people who are going through the Dublin procedure, or those who have been refused asylum. As the latter have to leave the country, they are no longer transferred to the cantonal centers.

A special federal center is reserved for asylum seekers who pose a threat to security and public order, or to the smooth running of other CFAs.

== See also ==
- Asylum law in Switzerland
- Asylum Act (Switzerland)
- Immigration to Switzerland

=== Videography ===
- Electronic brochure, "Information succinctes (sur les permis B et F réfugiés/personnes)" (PDF) (in French).

=== Bibliography ===
- Bertrand, Anne-Laure (2021). Dans la jungle des permis de séjour: Parcours administratifs et intégration professionnelle des réfugiés en Suisse (in French). Editions Seismo. ISBN 978-2-88351-091-3.
- Coalition of Independent Asylum Lawyers. Presentation: Bilan de la restructuration du domaine de l'asile; dossier: "Restructuration du domaine de l'asile. Bilan de la première année de mise en œuvre" (PDF). asile.ch (in French).
- Gafner, Magalie (2020). Autorisations de séjour en Suisse (in French). Éditions du CSP Vaud.
- United Nations High Commissioner for Refugees- Centre suisse pour la défense des droits des migrants, Stephanie A. Mot. "Family Reunification for Refugees in Switzerland Legal Framework and Strategic Considerations". Refworld.

=== External links ===
- "Secrétariat d'État aux migrations". sem.admin.ch (in French).
- Summary of residence permits in Switzerland: "Procédure, statuts et permis". asile.ch (in French).
- Swiss Refugee Council, Organisation suisse d'aide aux réfugiés. "Une interdiction de voyager très stricte au lieu d'une intégration facilitée pour les titulaires d'une admission provisoire". osar.ch (in French).
