= Foreign Nationals and Integration Act =

Swiss immigration law

Foreign Nationals and Integration Act (FNIA)

Federal Assembly of Switzerland
- Long title: Federal Act on Foreign Nationals and Integration (SR 142.20)
- Territorial extent: Switzerland
- Enacted by: Federal Assembly of Switzerland
- Enacted: 16 December 2005
- Commenced: 1 January 2008

Repeals
- Federal Act on the Residence and Settlement of Foreigners (1934)
- Status: Current legislation

The Federal Act on Foreign Nationals and Integration (FNIA), (Note: German: Ausländer- und Integrationsgesetz (AIG), French: Loi fédérale sur les étrangers et l’intégration (LEI), Italian: Legge federale sugli stranieri e la loro integrazione (LStrI)) previously known as Foreign Nationals Act (FNA) until 1 January 2019, is a Swiss federal law that regulates the immigration, residence and integration of foreign nationals in Switzerland. It was adopted on 16 December 2005 by the Federal Assembly and came into force on 1 January 2008. It replaces the Federal Act on the Residence and Settlement of Foreigners from 1934.

The primary objectives of the FNIA are to provide a clear legal framework for the admission, residence, and integration of foreign nationals in Switzerland. The law establishes the rights and obligations of foreign nationals, defines the requirements for obtaining visas and residence permits, and sets out the conditions under which foreigners may stay in Switzerland.

The FNIA also aims to promote the social, cultural, and economic integration of foreign nationals into Swiss society. To this end, the law requires foreign nationals to demonstrate a certain level of knowledge of the Swiss language, culture, and values before obtaining long-term residency permits. The FNIA also encourages the participation of foreign nationals in the labor market and supports measures to combat discrimination and promote diversity in Swiss society.

== History ==
The FNIA was first introduced in 2002 as a draft law by the Federal Council in response to growing public concerns about immigration and integration in Switzerland. The law aimed to unify existing federal and cantonal regulations on foreign nationals and promote a more coordinated approach to integration. After several revisions and consultations, the Swiss Federal Assembly adopted the FNIA on September 16, 2005, and it came into force on January 1, 2008.

The FNIA is administered by the State Secretariat for Migration (SEM), which is part of the Federal Department of Justice and Police. The SEM is responsible for issuing visas, residence permits and work permits for foreign nationals, as well as enforcing the law and coordinating with cantonal authorities.

== Key Provisions ==
The FNIA covers a wide range of issues related to the admission, residence, and integration of foreign nationals in Switzerland. Some of the key provisions of the FNIA include:

- Types of residence permits: The FNIA distinguishes between different types of residence permits for foreign nationals, including short-term permits, long-term permits, and permanent residency permits. The law also provides for family reunification and allows for the issuance of humanitarian residence permits in exceptional circumstances.
- Integration measures: The FNIA requires foreign nationals to participate in integration measures, such as language courses and orientation programs, as a condition for obtaining long-term residency permits. The law also provides for support measures for integration, including counseling and social services.
- Employment and labor market: The FNIA regulates the access of foreign nationals to the Swiss labor market, sets out the requirements for work permits, and establishes the conditions for self-employment and business start-ups.

The FNIA is supplemented by several ordinances issued by the Federal Council or the SEM, which provide more detailed rules on various aspects of the law.

== Criticism ==
The FNIA has been subject to criticism and controversy since its introduction. Some argue that the law promotes a strict and exclusive approach to integration that undermines the rights of foreign nationals and perpetuates discrimination. Others criticize the law's focus on language and culture as overly prescriptive and argue that it fails to address the structural barriers to integration that exist in Swiss society.

== See also ==
- Immigration to Switzerland
- Asylum Act
- State Secretariat for Migration
- Asylum law in Switzerland
