= Swiss Refugee Council =

Six aid organizations active in Switzerland

- Formation: 1936
- Type: NGO
- Purpose: Protect refugees and preserve human dignity.
- Location: Bern, Switzerland
- Secretary General: Beat Meiner
- Affiliations: European Council on Refugees and Exiles (ECRE)
- Staff: 30
- Website: https://www.refugeecouncil.ch/

The Swiss Refugee Council (German: Schweizerische Flüchtlingshilfe (SFH); French: Organisation suisse d'aide aux réfugiés (OSAR)) is the umbrella organization of eleven aid organizations active in Switzerland in the field of asylum, namely Caritas Switzerland, Entraide protestante suisse (EPER), l'Œuvre suisse d'entraide ouvrière (OSEO), Union suisse des comités d'entraide juive (USEJ), the Swiss section of Amnesty International (since 2010), the Swiss divisions of the Salvation Army (since 2013), the Refugee Aid Liechtenstein, the Zurich counseling center for asylum seekers, the Fachstelle Frauenhandel und Frauenmigration FIZ, and Save the Children Switzerland (since 2025).

The Swiss Refugee Council is a non-governmental, politically and denominationally independent organization, legally active in the field of asylum and refugees. Until 1991, the organization was called "Office central d'aide aux réfugiés" (Central Office for Refugee Aid).

== History ==
The organization was founded in 1936 under the name "Office central d'aide aux réfugiés" (OSAR) (or "Swiss Central Office for Refugee Aid" ) by thirteen aid organizations (later joined by six others) to support victims of the Nazi regime exiled in Switzerland. In 1938, the organization came to the aid of Austrian refugees following the Anschluss.

At the end of the war, the Central Office for Refugee Aid offered legal advice, helped repatriate displaced persons, and advocated permanent asylum for those unable to travel. An interdenominational hostel for refugees was set up in Saanen in 1947.

In 1956, the Central Office for Refugee Aid took part in the reception of Hungarian refugees following the Budapest uprising. The refugees were distributed among the cantons, and at the end of November 1956, it announced that it had received "4,600 job offers, which would probably provide accommodation and employment for 7,200 refugees".

In 1966, Federal Councillor von Moos appealed to the public on the eve of a fund-raising event for the organization: "The Central Office for Refugee Aid, a private institution founded 30 years ago, and its affiliated charities [...] carry out a noble task, the effects of which are felt far beyond our borders. [...] These organizations can only successfully fulfill their mission if they are supported by the spirit of self-sacrifice of each and every one of us". The number of refugees increased especially in 1968, from 20,000 to 33,000, and the Confederation increased its financial contribution by 50%.

In 1977-1979, it focused on Vietnamese refugees. In 1977, there were some 30,000 refugees in Switzerland, supported by the Confederation with a budget of around 8 million Swiss francs, through six aid organizations. The Confederation's contribution covers 90% of relief services, with the remaining 10% provided by the Central Office for Refugee Aid via its national fund-raising campaign. In its annual press release, the Central Office for Refugee Aid pointed out that "Years ago, the Central Office's national collection covered 50% of the costs of direct assistance and support for uprooted people in difficulty, with the remainder paid by the Confederation".

A Central Office for French-speaking Switzerland was opened in Lausanne in 1980. In 1982, the aid organizations grouped together under the Central Office for Refugee Aid appealed to the Confederation to reimburse their deficits following the increase in the number of refugees. The Confederation's budget amounted to CHF 12.6 million in 1981, and a further CHF 6.6 million were needed for 1982.

In 1985, the Central Office for Refugee Aid expected the Confederation to make its intentions more transparent and to take responsibility for them", criticizing the waiting time between the submission of an asylum application and the decision handed down by the authorities. The Office went on to stress the growing difficulties. Heinz Haab, from the Central Office for Refugee Aid stated that "today's refugees are not what they used to be: they are poorer, more numerous and more colorful than those who crossed our borders a decade ago. Their motives are harder to grasp. [...] income from collections has fallen".

In 1989, the relief organizations called on political parties, churches, associations and cantons to conclude a "social pact", following the federal report on asylum strategy in the 1990s. The Central Office for Refugee Aid called for a special status for refugees who are collective victims of violence. It also called for a more generous acceptance practice, given the "indisputable hardening" of asylum policy over the previous twenty years. The aim was also to strengthen the integration of refugees, a quarter of whom came from around 15 countries to which they could not be returned because of the war still raging there.

The Swiss Central Office for Refugee Aid became the "Swiss Refugee Council" in 1991, and continued to adapt and react to changes in asylum law. In 1992, Algeria, Angola, India and Romania were removed from the list of "safe countries". The 1993 Refugee Day was held under the theme "Et si c'était vous?" ("And if it were you?", in English), that of 1994 took place in 150 Swiss towns and villages, and in 1996 the slogan "Tradition - Nous y tenons" ("Tradition, we have it") appealed to Switzerland's humanitarian tradition.

In 2016, the Swiss Refugee Council supported the revision of the Asylum Act (LAsi), which accelerated asylum procedures and offered free legal aid for asylum seekers. When this revision came into force in 2019, however, the Swiss Refugee Council warned that procedures would be speeded up to the detriment of their fairness. Following the Federal Council's activation of protection status S (collective protection granted to refugees from war-torn countries) for refugees from Ukraine from March 12, 2022, the Swiss Refugee Council called for the same rights to apply to all refugees. While the F permit limits the right to family reunification and the freedom to travel, the S protection status limits access to integration measures.

== Objectives ==
Since its foundation, the Swiss Refugee Council has represented the interests of asylum seekers and refugees in dealings with the authorities, politicians and the general public.

According to its charter, its main missions are to ensure that the asylum procedure is fair and complies with the Constitution, to promote the active participation of refugees in the economic, social, cultural and political life of Switzerland, and to ensure that rejected asylum seekers are returned in safety and dignity.

Active throughout Switzerland, the Swiss Refugee Council has extensive knowledge and experience in the field of asylum. It accompanies asylum seekers throughout the entire procedure - from application to acceptance or return.

== Activities ==
Its activities are focused on several areas.

Legal advice

The Swiss Refugee Council advises and informs asylum seekers and refugees about their rights and the latest developments in asylum law and practice.

Representation of relief organizations

Since 1968, representatives of self-help organizations have taken part as neutral observers in asylum hearings (Art. 30 of the Asylum Act). On behalf of the Confederation, the Swiss Refugee Council coordinates and trains the aid organization representatives to enable them to carry out their task.

Systematic observation of asylum law and practice

The legal bases and practical rules for asylum seekers are under constant review. The Swiss Refugee Council regularly intervenes with recommendations to the authorities or public statements.

Country analyses

In order to objectively assess the need for protection in the asylum procedure, the economic and political situation in the country of origin must be known. The Swiss Refugee Council continually prepares and publishes country analyses, with regular updates, and produces expert reports on specific asylum issues.

Training

The Swiss Refugee Council supports refugees by granting training subsidies and financing language courses.

Family reunification

Financial assistance is granted to families.

Public awareness and events

The Swiss Refugee Council organizes awareness-raising days for the general public on the themes of exile, asylum and integration. Since 1980, the "Refugee Day" has been held every year on the 3rd weekend in June. Every two years, the "Swiss Asylum Symposium" takes place, organized in collaboration with the United Nations High Commissioner for Refugees (UNHCR).

== Affiliated organizations ==
The organizations associated with the Swiss Refugee Council are the Christian Peace Movement (CPM), the International Social Service (ISS), Liechtenstein Refugee Aid, the Swiss Red Cross (SRC) and the Liechtenstein Red Cross. The Swiss Refugee Council cooperates with all non-governmental organizations active in the field of asylum and migration, with the Federal Office for Migration (FOM), cantonal and municipal authorities, and is a member of the European Council on Refugees and Exiles (ECRE).

== Publications ==
- Organisation suisse d'aide aux réfugiés (2009). Manuel de la procédure d'asile et de renvoi. Translated by Olivier von Allmen. Berne: Haupt. ISBN 9783258075327.
- Organisation suisse d'aide aux réfugiés; [réd. Sonya Mermoud] (1996). 60 ans d'aide aux réfugiés : 1936-1996. Lausanne: OSAR, Secrétariat romand.
- Organisation suisse d'aide aux réfugiés (1994). Avec les réfugiés, contre la violence : Journée des réfugiés : 18 juin 1994, 19 juin 1994. Lausanne: OSAR. p. 11.
- Annemarie Isenschmid (1993). Syrie : dossier à l'attention des représentants d'œuvres d'entraide et des bureaux de consultation juridique. Translated by F. Biamonte. Lausanne: OSAR, Secrétariat romand.
- Zahnd, Claire; Zahnd, Jean (1991). OSAR (ed.). Mosaïque : éléments pour l'enseignement de la langue française aux réfugiés et requérants d'asile: Feuilles de vocabulaire et de travail. Lausanne.
- Irina Lerch-Bortoli (1986). Office central suisse d'aide aux réfugiés (OSAR) : 50 ans d'aide aux réfugiés. Translated by Martine Besse. Lausanne: OSAR, Secrétariat romand.

== TV ==
The "Ensemble" program on Télévision Suisse Romande on June 6, 2010 was dedicated to the Swiss Refugee Council. The itinerary of a refugee family from Vietnam was presented in just a few minutes.

== See also ==
- Asylum law in Switzerland
- Right of Asylum in France
- Asylum residence permits in Switzerland

== Bibliography ==
- Sylvie Maurer, « 50e anniversaire de l'OSAR: Demi-siècle de lutte en faveur des réfugiés » (in French), in Gazette de Lausanne, June 28, 1986.
- Jonas Arnold, Vom Transitprinzip zum Dauerasyl: Die Schweizerische Flüchtlingshilfe 1933-1951 (in German), Lizentiatsarbeit, université de Fribourg, 1997.
