= German immigration to Switzerland =

German migrants in Switzerland
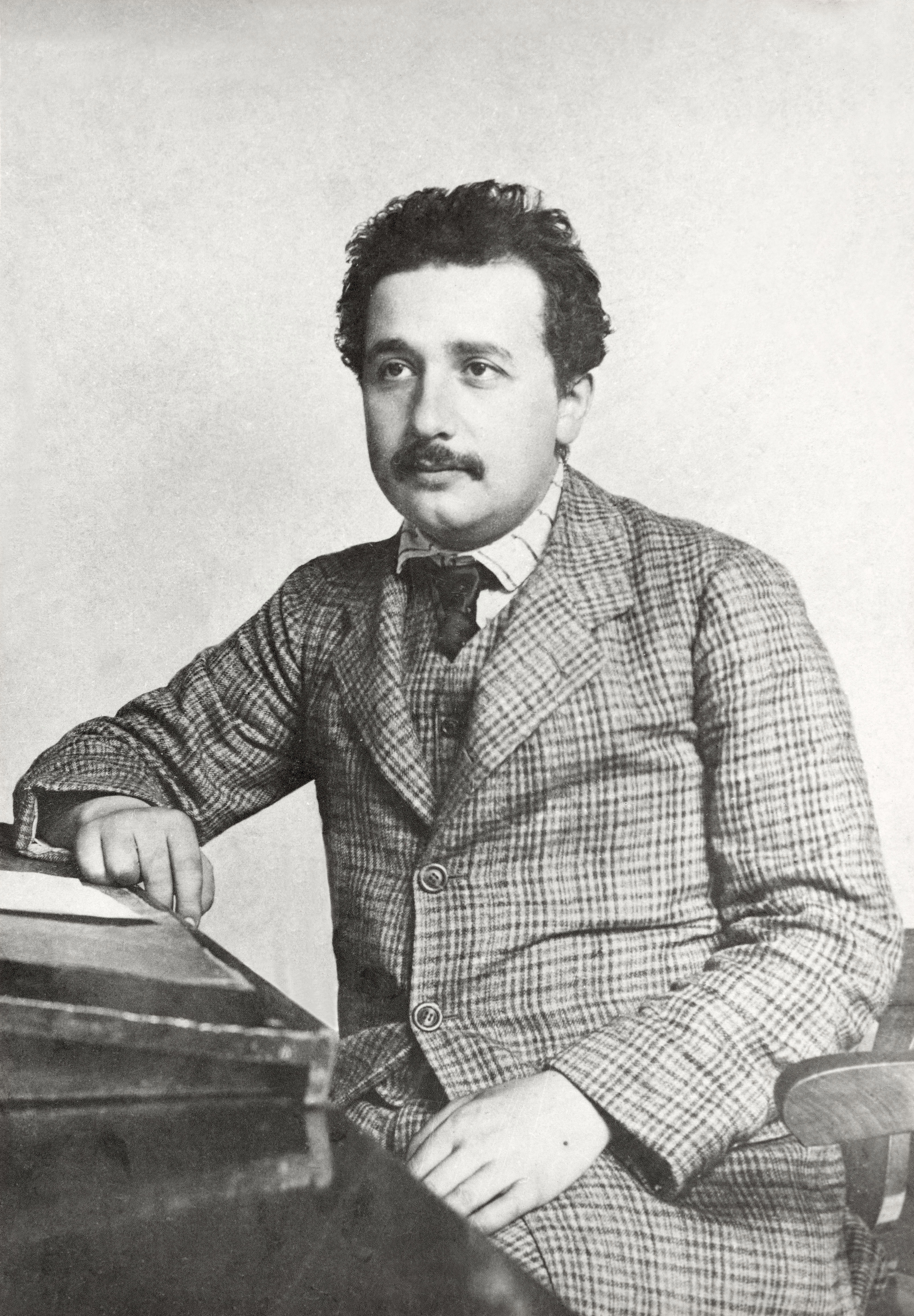
- The German-born scientist Albert Einstein as an employee of the Swiss Patent Office (Bern, 1905)

Total population
- 306,188 (2018)

Regions with significant populations
- Zürich; metropolitan areas of Zürich, Basel, Bern / German speaking cantons (some 2/3 to 3/4 of the German migrants); other cantons (some 1/4 to 1/3)

Languages
- German, French, Italian

Religion
- Irreligious majority (52%); Lutheranism and Roman Catholicism

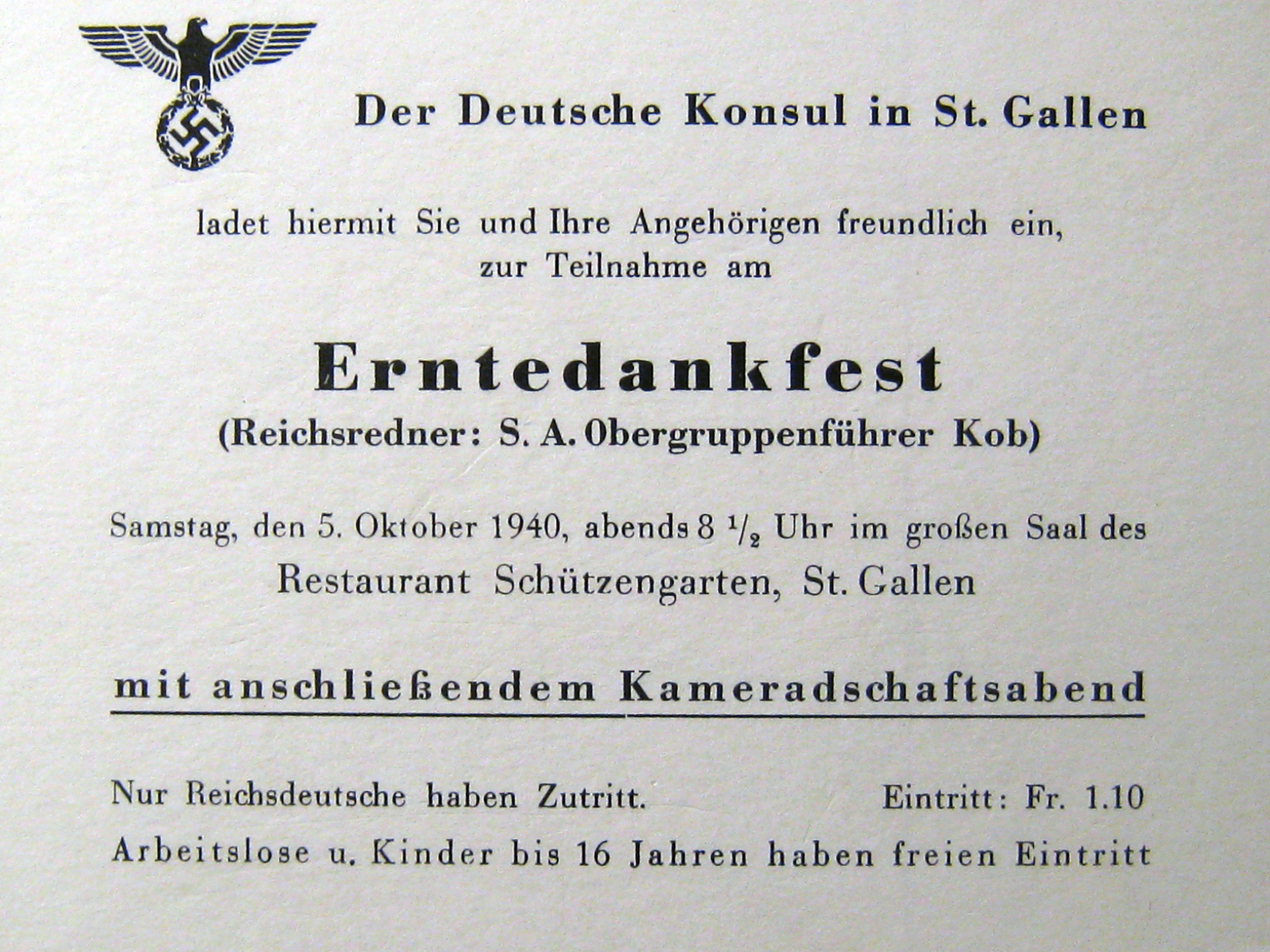
Invite to Thanksgiving evening by German consul in St. Gallen (1940), "for Reichsdeutsche only...Reichsredner: S.A. Gruppenführer Kolb"

About 250,000 German nationals had permanent residence in Switzerland in 2009, rising to some 300,000 five years later. Accounting for multiple citizenships the number of German nationals living in Switzerlands is much higher, at about 450,000 in 2019. For the Germans, Switzerland became the most appreciated country to settle in, to find work or to study. The "surge" of immigration during the first decade of the 21st century, especially the German one, is a result of the EU-15 opening and, for students, of the Bologna Process.

== History ==
Ever since the emergence of Switzerland and Germany as distinct nations in the Early Modern period – the Swiss became exempt from the jurisdiction of the Imperial Diet in 1499 as a result of the Swabian War, formal recognition of Swiss independence dates to 1648 (Peace of Westphalia) – there has been considerable population movement in both directions. Meaningful population statistics became available only after the Napoleonic era, with the formation of the restored Swiss Confederacy and the German Confederation in 1815.

In the first decades of the 20th century, a number of Germans and other groups living in Germany fled or were expelled by the German Empire and shortly afterwards the Nazi regime, and sought refuge in Switzerland, among other places.

== 21st century ==
=== Demographics ===
Because of the unequal size of the two countries, Germany being roughly ten times larger than Switzerland, German residents in Switzerland have a much greater visibility than Swiss residents in Germany: In 2007, about 37,000 Swiss nationals, or about 1 in 180 Swiss citizens, lived in Germany, accounting for just 0.05% of German population. At the same time, about 224,000 German nationals, or 1 in 350 German citizens, lived in Switzerland, accounting for 3% of Swiss population.

The number of Germans in Switzerland has doubled in the period of 2002 to 2009. The reason for this is the Swiss–European treaty regarding the freedom of movement for workers, activated in 2002. While the freedom of movement treaty applies to all EU citizens, German nationals have been the main beneficiaries because their proficiency in the German language allows them to take qualified jobs in German-speaking Switzerland without the added difficulty of a language barrier.

As of 2009, they were the second-largest expatriate group in Switzerland, numbering 266,000 (or 3.4% of total Swiss population) second to the Italians with 294,000 (3.7% of total Swiss population). 22,000 were born in Switzerland (of these, 18,000 were minors, children born to German parents living in Switzerland). 19,000 Germans with permanent residence in Switzerland were married to a Swiss citizen.

In 2007, the number of Germans in Switzerland passed the historical maximum of 220,000 Germans recorded prior to World War I. However, because of the lower total population at the time, the pre-1914 fraction of Germans relative to total Swiss population was as high as 6%. The rate of naturalizations has also steeply increased since 2007. The reason for this, beyond the rising number of qualifying German nationals who had resided in Switzerland for the twelve years required by Swiss nationality law, was a change in German nationality law which permitted German nationals to hold Swiss-German dual citizenship (while prior to 2007, Germans wishing to be naturalized in Switzerland had to give up their German citizenship).

In 2017, there were almost 15,000 German nationals living in the non-German speaking cantons of Vaud, Geneva, Ticino, Neuchâtel and Jura. In the same year more than 67% of Germans, living in Switzerland, were permanent residents (i.e. have the permit C).

Historical demographics 1995–2017:

year	1995	2000	2005	2006	2007	2008	2009	2010	2011	2012	2013	2014	2015	2016	2017
German population (thousands)	92	110	159	174	203	235	252	263	275	284	292	298	301	304	305
percentage	1.3%	1.6%	2.4%		2.9%		3.4%								3.6%
naturalizations					1,290		3,969	3,549	3,484	3,318	3,773	4,069	5,212	4,610	5,973
2017 – German citizens with permanent residence in Switzerland in the larger German speaking cantons: Zürich 89,000 (5.9% of the inhabitants / 29.1% of the German citizens); Aargau 34,000 (5.1% / 11.2%); Bern 28,000 (2.7% / 9.1%); Thurgau 22,000 (8.0% / 7.2%); Basel-City 16,000 (8.1% / 5.2%); Lucerne 11,000 (3.4% / 4.6%); Basel-Country 12,000 (4.3% / 4.0%) – in total some 214 thousands, 70.4% of the 305 thousands.

German citizens have mostly settled in Zürich and the city's wider metropolitan area. Already at the historical maximum of German presence in Switzerland in 1910, German population in Zürich was as high as 41,000 or 22% of the city's total population. As of 2009, German population in Zürich was at about 30,000, or close to 8%. As of 2015 this population counted 33,297, slightly above 8% of the 410,404 inhabitants, of which 131,168 were foreigners, some third of all people of the city of Zürich.

=== Reception and image in Switzerland ===
Fears, xenophobia, feelings of being left-behind

Since 2007, there have been reports on Swiss xenophobia (or "germanophobia") directed against German immigration, both in Swiss and in German media.

While Swiss opposition against immigration from Southeast Europe and Africa is – as in other places – characterized by concerns about criminality and the burden put on social welfare by large numbers of lower class or destitute immigrants, opposition to immigration from Germany has a contrary motivation, notably the fear of competition from qualified immigrants on the job market, and rising prices on the real-estate market because of the increased demand created by well-to-do German immigrants, while in terms of crime rate, the German community was recorded as the group with lowest delinquency, at only 0.6% of the crime rate among Swiss nationals.

The extent of and reasons for Swiss opposition to German immigration were studied in Helbling (2009–11), based on a survey from 1994 to 1995 of 1,300 Swiss (of which some 940 responded) from the city of Zürich (Zürich, and the Zürich area, are the main target of recent German immigration – see demographics above). The survey found that, in 1994–95, the Germans were the fourth-most disliked immigrant group in Zürich (disliked by almost each 9th). Following – with a distance – the immigrants from Turkey (disliked by each 3rd to 4th), the Arab World (disliked by each 3rd) and Former Yugoslavia (considered as a single group, disliked by each 2nd). And disliked slightly more than the Tamils (disliked by each 10th) and Black Africans (disliked by each narrowly under each 10th of the 940 respondents).

Hostile attitudes towards immigration groups in the city of Zürich in 1994-95
...towards	hostility – in percentage of the 940 Swiss who responded...
• Italians
• Spaniards
• Portuguese
• French
• Black Africans
• Tamils
• Germans
• Turks
• Arabs
• Yugoslavians
(full hostility 100%)

Helbling concludes – summing up further literature and media – that "German immigrants put in danger Swiss characteristics as much as immigrants from the Balkans", that "contrary to many other studies, education does not improve attitudes towards Germans", that "people who are young and seek to improve their job position are significantly more Germanophobic than those who are satisfied with their current job situation and are already established" and that "it appears that as much as low-skilled workers fear that poorly educated immigrants take their jobs, well-educated Swiss consider German immigrants as competitors on the job market".

As to the feeling of the "intimidated" part of Swiss-Germans, feeling being left-behind, the journalist Gunhild Kübler, a German living in Switzerland, remarks:

China has 1.3 billion people, 16 times more than Germany. The Federal Republic again exactly 16 times as many as the German-speaking Switzerland. So, if a German would put himself in the position of an intimidated German Swiss, he may well imagine that his country is not adjacent in the East to the Czech Republic but to China.

— Gunhild Kübler

Cristiana Baldauf, one of the course leaders of the Swiss integration courses for Germans and Austrians, and a German and Swiss citizen, with a German mother and Italian father, says:

I think, that what the Swiss dislike about the Germans, is the German in themselves.

— Cristiana Baldauf

Integration – differences in culture, behavior, manners, language problems

Experience shows that the excitement fades away on every major wave of immigration with its increasing integration. So, a.o. also Helbling cites the popular example of now largely integrated Italians, who came in one of the "waves" in the '60s as gastarbeiters to Switzerland, and whose generations are today a part of the society of the German-speaking Switzerland, without giving up their culture.

It is particularly notable that Italians are the most liked immigrants, while at their arrival in the 1950s and 1960s they were the group of immigrants that attracted the most hostilities.

— Marc Helbling

In the relations of the German-Swiss and the incoming German come up, overtly or covertly, specific misunderstandings – perceived similarities, different mentalities and manners and, now already well known, language problems and differences.

Cristiana Baldauf comments on the fundamental differences, on the petty ones and on the different languages:

One has to bear in mind that the Swiss are ticking quite differently as we do.

— Cristiana Baldauf

Often just minor differences bear a potential for misunderstanding.

— Cristiana Baldauf

The language plays a central role in the misunderstanding. The Swiss German is more than just a dialect for most German-speaking Swiss, it is the mother tongue, the language of the heart. Much of what has to do with proximity is expressed with the Swiss German: intimacy, spontaneity and emotions [...]
High German is indeed learned and spoken at school, although the active knowledge remains hidden away in the cellar, often making the Swiss feeling inferior to the eloquent Germans.

— Cristiana Baldauf

== See also ==
- Germany–Switzerland relations
- Demographics of Switzerland
- Demographics of Germany
- Migration within Europe
- Switzerland–European Union relations

== Notes and references ==
21st century – 1st decades (most references in German)

- Official demographic data from Swiss Federal Statistics Office
- Marc Helbling (2009–11): Variants of Migration: Why Swiss-Germans dislike Germans. Opposition to culturally similar and highly skilled immigrants. In: European Societies 13 (1), February 2011 – Abstract, Info on tandfonline.com / Marc Helbling: Germanophobia in Switzerland (PDF), Discussion Paper SP IV 2010–702, WZB Berlin, May 2010 / Marc Helbling: Why Swiss-Germans dislike Germans. Opposition to culturally similar and highly skilled immigrants (PDF), paper for the annual meeting of the Swiss Political Science Association at the University of Geneva, 8 January 2010, WZB January 2010 / Marc Helbling: Germanophobia in Switzerland: Theoretical background and objectives , Forschungsprojekt WZB, 2009–10
