= Asylum law in Switzerland =

Asylum law in Switzerland is the responsibility of the Swiss Confederation, while the cantons are responsible for implementing the decisions of the State Secretariat for Migration (SEM).

== Legal basis ==
Asylum law in Switzerland is governed by the Asylum Act of 1998 (AsylA), the Foreign Nationals and Integration Act of 2005 (FNIA) and the Geneva Convention of July 28, 1951. Switzerland applies Regulation (EU) no. 604/2013, known as "Dublin III", which determines which member state is responsible for processing an asylum application from a third-country national.

The cantonal laws and implementing regulations specify the role of the organizations responsible for helping migrants. In the canton of Vaud, for example, the Etablissement Vaudois d'Accueil des Migrants (EVAM) operates under the Law on Assistance to Asylum Seekers and Certain Categories of Foreigners, as well as other cantonal acts governing social assistance and the integration of foreigners.

== Asylum application ==
Anyone can submit an asylum application at a border crossing, at a Swiss airport checkpoint or at a confederation center. Filing an asylum application on Swiss territory entitles the applicant to remain in the country throughout the first-instance procedure and any ordinary appeal.

=== Federal Asylum Centres (FAC) ===
Anyone applying for asylum in Switzerland is automatically directed to one of the FACs, where he or she will be taken into care for a period of 140 days, after which he or she will be allocated to a canton responsible for providing accommodation and subsistence until a decision is reached on the asylum application.

The federal centers are divided into regions or cantons, with one FAC handling procedural tasks, while others deal mainly with accommodation. The Les Verrières center is reserved for difficult cases.

==== List of federal Asylum Centres ====
Regional structure	With procedural tasks	Without procedural tasks	Airport
French-speaking Switzerland	Boudry	VallorbeGiffersLes Verrières	Geneva
Bern	Bern	KappelenBoltigen	
Northwestern Switzerland	Basel	AllschwilFlumenthalReinach BL	
Ticino and Central Switzerland	Chiasso (administration)	Chiasso (accommodation) Balerna (CFA Pasture) Sarnen (CFA Glaubenberg)	
Eastern Switzerland	Altstätten	KreuzlingenSulgen	
Zurich	Zurich	EmbrachBrugg	Zurich

=== Procedure ===
Once an asylum application has been submitted, the SEM records the applicant's personal and biometric data, including fingerprints. These are compared with a European database to determine whether proceedings are already underway in another country. The authorities may also carry out investigations into identity and travel documents, as well as into the applicant's health status.

A first consultation takes place to inform the applicant of his or her rights and obligations during the asylum procedure, along with interviews with legal assistants and SEM authorities. The authorities then decide whether to apply the Dublin procedure (i.e., the application must be processed in the state through which the person arrived in Europe), the Swiss "accelerated procedure" or the extended procedure. In the case of the accelerated procedure, which must be completed in 140 days maximum, the SEM interviews the applicant and examines the evidence to determine whether asylum can be granted. If further clarification is required after the hearing to reach a decision, the extended procedure applies: the applicant is then assigned to a canton, which will house him or her for the duration of this procedure, which may last up to one year.

=== Refugee status ===
The refugee status (B permit) is granted to "persons who in their native country or in their country of last residence are subject to serious disadvantages or have a well-founded fear of being exposed to such disadvantages for reasons of race, religion, nationality, membership of a particular social group or due to their political opinions". The State Secretariat for Migration (SEM) takes gender into account when examining asylum applications, as women and sexual minorities are persecuted as a social group.

In the Swiss case, the danger to life, physical integrity or freedom, as well as measures resulting in unbearable psychological pressure, are considered sufficient reasons to apply for refugee status. Specific reasons for women's flight must also be taken into account. However, refusal to serve or desertion from the army are not accepted reasons. The refugee status does not apply for behaviors the person may have engaged in after leaving his or her country of origin or departure, if these acts do not constitute the expression of convictions or orientations already held before departure, nor are they a continuation of them.

The refugee status is granted on a case-by-case, individual basis. The applicant must prove that he or she is personally targeted by persecution seriously endangering his or her life, physical integrity or freedom. Thus, civilians fleeing a conflict situation do not in principle have refugee status if they are not personally threatened due to their membership of a group or their political opinions. They may, however, be granted provisional admission and authorized to stay in Switzerland for as long as the conflict lasts. Following a proposal by the Federal Council, Switzerland grants Ukrainians fleeing the Russian-Ukrainian war of 2022 protection status S, which has never been activated until now.

As an exception to the general system of personal refugee status, the Confederation may grant asylum to general groups of applicants. The decision is taken by the Federal Council when a large number of people are concerned, and by the Federal Department of Justice and Police in other cases. In view of the Taliban's return to power in August 2021, the FDJP is granting asylum to a contingent of 218 Afghan nationals.

Refugees recognized as such are granted a residence permit and are authorized to engage in paid employment. Refugee status is also automatically granted to the spouse and minor children of the persecuted person, as well as to children born in Switzerland.

=== Rejection with provisional admission ===
If the conditions for recognition of the refugee status are not met, but return to the country of origin would expose the applicant to serious general danger, usually because the applicant's region of origin is in the grip of conflict, the SEM rejects the asylum application but grants provisional protection (F permit). Provisional protection is automatically renewed every 12 months, but can be lifted at any time by the Confederation when the reasons for granting it have ended, generally when peace is restored in the applicant's region of origin. Organizations such as Swiss Refugee Council criticize this procedure as leading to long-term precariousness, the restriction of fundamental rights (notably the right of movement) and increasing integration challenges for the people concerned.

=== Rejection without provisional admission ===
Asylum seekers who are unable to prove their status as asylum seekers, and who do not come from a country in the grip of war or generalized violence, have their applications rejected and are sent back to their country of origin (known as "rejected" asylum seekers). The decision is accompanied by a departure deadline, after which residence in Switzerland becomes illegal.

=== Rejection of application (NEM) ===
If the asylum seeker does not meet the conditions listed under article 31a of the Asylum Act, the SEM will not consider his or her application. In most cases, these are applicants who have already applied for asylum in another European Union or European Economic Area state (and are therefore subject to the Dublin agreements), or who are not considered to be seeking protection "due to persecution".

== Withdrawal of refugee status ==
Once granted, refugee status can be withdrawn in the following cases:

- If the person has voluntarily reclaimed the protection of the country of his or her nationality.
- If, having lost their nationality, they have voluntarily reacquired it.
- If he/she has acquired a new nationality and enjoys the protection of the country whose nationality he/she has acquired.
- If he/she has voluntarily returned to settle in the country he/she left or outside which he/she remained for fear of persecution.
- If he/she is granted asylum or permanent residence in another country.
- If the circumstances which led to recognition as a refugee have ceased to exist in either the country of origin or the country from which he/she came, he/she may no longer refuse to avail him/herself of the protection of the country of his/her nationality.
- In the case of a person who does not have a nationality, if the circumstances which led to his or her recognition as a refugee have ceased to exist, he or she is able to return to the country in which he or she had his or her habitual residence.
- If the person breaches a travel ban.
- If the person stays abroad for more than a year.
- If the person renounces refugee status. In this case, if the person subsequently wishes to regain refugee status, the SEM may refuse.

The provisions of the Convention Relating to the Status of Refugees will not apply at all to refugees if: (1) The person has committed a crime against peace, a war crime or a crime against humanity (2), The person has committed a serious non-political crime outside the country of refuge before being admitted as a refugee (3), The person has been guilty of acts contrary to the purposes and principles of the United Nations (4), The person has obtained refugee status by making false statements or by concealing essential facts (5), The person has undermined Switzerland's internal or external security or has committed particularly reprehensible criminal acts punishable by a heavy penalty.

In all cases, the refugee cannot be deported without having had the opportunity to express his or her views to the SEM.

=== Legal effects ===
The withdrawal of the refugee status necessarily entails loss of asylum, although the opposite is not always true. Loss of refugee status means that the person can no longer avail him/herself of the Convention relating to the Status of Refugees, and loses the right to a travel document, for example. The travel document must be returned to the SEM after the decision to revoke refugee status has been taken. However, the withdrawal of the refugee status - or asylum - has no effect on a cantonal residence or settlement permit if one has already been issued. However, if the refugee has only been admitted on a provisional basis, admission may be withdrawn once the refugee status has been withdrawn and removal from Switzerland enforced. These decisions do not extend to the refugee's spouse or children, and asylum will only be withdrawn from them if they personally meet the conditions for withdrawal of the refugee status.

== Appeals and reconsiderations ==
Any decision by the Federal Office for Migration can be appealed to the Federal Administrative Court (FAC) within 7 days under an accelerated procedure, or 30 days under an extended procedure. Of the FAC's six courts, Courts IV and V deal with asylum cases; they may coordinate with Court VI, which deals with immigration law. Among other things, they rule on issues of family reunification or family asylum.

When the SEM issues a decision of non-entrée en matière (demand rejected) or Dublin procedure, the time limit for appeal is five days. As the appeal has suspensive effect, the removal cannot be carried out until the ordinary channels of appeal have been exhausted.

When it is no longer possible to file an ordinary appeal, either because the appeal filed has been rejected or because the time limit for appeal has expired, the applicant, if he or she has not left Switzerland, may request reconsideration of his or her application at any time. They can submit new evidence that they were unable to obtain at the time of their application, invoke new facts that would render their removal unjustifiable under Article 4 of the Asylum Act, or invoke case law that has since forced the SEM to grant refugee status or provisional protection on grounds previously deemed insufficient. Extraordinary legal remedies such as reconsideration have no suspensive effect.

== Residence permits after a divorce ==
=== Legal basis in the event of dissolution of marriage or family ===
For applications to extend refugee permits obtained through family reunification, the Foreign Nationals and Integration Ac (FNIA) of 2005, the Asylum Act (AsylA) and the Ordinance of October 24, 2007 on Admission, Residence and Gainful Employment (VZAE) apply.

=== Context ===
Under articles 43 and 44 of the Immigration Act, the foreign spouse of a residence permit holder and his or her unmarried foreign children under the age of 18 may obtain a residence permit and its extension through family reunification. It is only possible to apply for an extension if all the following conditions are met:

- They live in the same household as the permit holder who has applied for family reunification;
- They have suitable accommodation
- They are not dependent on social assistance;
- They are able to communicate in the national language spoken in their place of residence;
- The person applying for family reunification is not in receipt of annual supplementary benefits under the Supplementary Benefits Act, nor could he or she receive such benefits as a result of family reunification.

Family reunification is also possible for the spouse and unmarried children under 18 of provisionally admitted persons. Provisionally admitted refugees may also benefit from family reunification and the same status, at the earliest three years after provisional admission has been granted, provided they meet the relevant conditions.

Once the family has been dissolved, the conditions for extending the various types of residence permits granted to refugees need to be analyzed. Divorce does not necessarily imply a return to the country of origin for a person who has joined a spouse through family reunification.

=== Conditions for extension after divorce ===
Everyone has the right to file for divorce unilaterally, provided they meet the conditions attached to the application, or by mutual consent of the spouses. However, divorce has a number of legal consequences for spouses and children, as well as for the residence permit of foreigners in Switzerland.

In the case of a residence permit obtained as a result of family reunification applied for by an asylum seeker, the holder of this permit may remain in Switzerland only under certain conditions following divorce or the dissolution of the family. If these conditions are not met, the person concerned risks having his or her residence permit refused by the competent authorities. These conditions also apply in the event of the death of the spouse from whom the person's permit derives. These conditions apply by analogy to the dissolution of a registered partnership.

If a family or marriage breaks up, the person concerned may apply to extend the refugee residence permit obtained through family reunification, subject to certain conditions which are set out in article 44 FNIA in conjunction with article 77 VZAE, which sets out the same conditions for extension as article 50 FNIA.

These articles stipulate that the residence permit granted to a spouse and children through family reunification under art. 44 FNIA may be extended after dissolution of the marriage or family if the conjugal union has lasted at least three years with a common household, or if continued residence in Switzerland is required for major personal reasons.

In the case of children, this is possible if the children have lived in the same household as the parent applying for family reunification. Major personal reasons are given when a spouse is a victim of conjugal violence, the marriage was entered into in violation of the free will of one of the spouses, or social reintegration in the country of origin seems seriously compromised. In order to prove domestic violence, if it is invoked as a serious motive, the following documents, in particular, must be provided as evidence for the application:

a. medical certificates;

b. police reports;

c. criminal complaints;

d. measures pursuant to art. 28b of the Swiss Civil Code, or related criminal judgments.

In addition to one of the two above-mentioned conditions, article 77 al. 4 VZAE also requires the person to be integrated. This article stipulates that the person applying to extend their residence permit must prove that they are well integrated in Switzerland.

The integration criteria taken into account when examining applications include the following:

- An impeccable reputation, including respect for public safety and order, and respect for the values of the Constitution.
- Good oral language skills. In other words, a good understanding of the language spoken in the place of residence, equivalent to at least level A1 of the reference framework.
- Willingness to work or undergo training.

== Submitting an application ==
To obtain an extension or renewal of the residence permit, the application must be submitted to the cantonal migration authority in the canton where the person lives. Depending on where the application is submitted, various documents must be enclosed with the application.

Applications to renew residence permits must be made no earlier than three months and no later than two weeks before the permit expires. In some cantons, such as Geneva, there may be long waiting periods. Delays can hamper the applicant's efforts to find employment, housing or training, for example. If waiting too long for a decision on a residence permit makes it impossible to take certain important steps, it is possible to request an attestation legitimizing the stay in Switzerland from the authority where the application was made. This attestation indicates that the person concerned is awaiting a decision on his or her application for renewal.

== The role of associations ==
Associations play a role in access to asylum in Switzerland. Caritas Switzerland, which has been appointed by the Swiss Confederation to provide legal representation for asylum-seekers in the extended first-instance procedure, offers legal advice and represents asylum-seekers during the legal process. The Swiss Refugee Council and the Swiss Church Aid HEKS/EPER provide information on legal situations and refer asylum seekers to the appropriate authorities. Finally, there are many different associations in Switzerland, depending on the field and the canton.

The Swiss Confederation supports the Swiss Refugee Council, HEKS and Caritas, as well as other non-governmental associations, by guaranteeing limited free legal services related to the decisive stages in the asylum decision. The term "decisive stage" refers to:

- Preparing for hearings
- Hearings on asylum grounds
- Granting the right to be heard
- Elements that contribute significantly to establishing the facts.

The costs of appeals are not covered by the SEM.

Asylum-seekers have access to legal representation at federal centers for asylum-seekers or, for those involved in the extended procedure, at designated legal advice offices in the cantons.

== Statistics ==
According to the SEM, 1313 asylum applications were submitted in Switzerland in March 2022, compared with 941 in March 2021. In addition, 15100 people fleeing Ukraine were granted protection status S.

Of the 1,392 applications that received a verdict in March 2022, the SEM granted asylum to 393 applicants and 309 were granted provisional admission at first instance. 417 have been refused entry (312 of them on the basis of the Dublin Agreement). There are still 4,439 applications pending at first instance, 13 more than in February 2022.

== See also ==
- Right of asylum
- Immigration to Switzerland
- Asylum residence permits in Switzerland
- Asylum Act (Switzerland)

== Bibliography ==
- Swiss League for Human Rights (1985). La forteresse européenne et les réfugiés : actes des 1ères Assises européennes sur le droit d'asile, 15-17 février 1985. Nord-Sud (in French). Editions d'En bas. ISBN 2829000714. OCLC 13112991.
- Bogumil, Terminski (August 2011). Les migrations, les réfugiés, les droits de l'homme: un guide bibliographique des publications parues en langue française. New Issues in Refugee Research, Working Paper No. 216 (in French).
- Gafner, Magalie; Metreveli, Roin (2007). Autorisations de séjour en Suisse: Présence, regroupement familial, travail, assurances sociales, etc.-Un guide juridique (in French). La Passerelle-CSP. ISBN 9789994059607. OCLC 170063705.
- Heiniger, Tobias (2021). Accéder à l'éducation indépendamment du droit de séjour (PDF) (in French). Translated by Karin Vogt. Berne: Observatoire suisse du droit d'asile et des étrangers.
- Parini, Lorena (1997). La politique d'asile en Suisse : une perspective systémique: Une perspective systémique. Logiques politiques (in French). Paris: L'Harmattan. ISBN 2-7384-5849-1. OCLC 39951838.
- Parini, Lorena (1997). "La Suisse terre d'asile: un mythe ébranlé par l'histoire". Revue Européenne des Migrations Internationales. 13 (1): 51–69. doi:10.3406/remi.1997.1532.
- Weber, Noémi; Hamann, Michelle (2020). Négligence de l'intérêt supérieur de l'enfant: Personnes mineurs dans les procédures de droit d'asile et des étrangers (PDF) (in French). Berne: Observatoire suisse du droit d'asile et des étrangers.
