= Asylum Act (Switzerland) =

Swiss law governing the procedures for granting asylum to refugees

Asylum Act (AsylA)

Federal Assembly of Switzerland
- Long title: SR 142.31
- Territorial extent: Switzerland
- Enacted by: Federal Assembly of Switzerland
- Enacted: 26 June 1998
- Commenced: 1 October 1999

Repeals
- Asylum Act (1981)
- Status: Current legislation

The Asylum Act (AsylA) (Note: German: Asylgesetz, AsylG; French: Loi sur l’asile, LAsi; Italian: Legge sull’asilo, LAsi) is a Swiss federal law that governs the country's procedures for granting asylum to refugees. It was adopted on 26 June 1998 by the Federal Assembly and came into force on 1 October 1999. It replaces the previous and first Asylum Act from 1981.

The Asylum Act lays down the legal framework for Switzerland's asylum system. It sets out the criteria for granting asylum and the procedures that must be followed. Under the Act, asylum seekers must demonstrate that they have a well-founded fear of persecution in their home country, based on their race, religion, nationality, political opinion, or membership in a particular social group. The Act also provides for the possibility of granting temporary protection to refugees in exceptional circumstances.

AsylA is administered by the State Secretariat for Migration (SEM), which is part of the Federal Department of Justice and Police, with appeals being handled by the Federal Administrative Court.

== Key provisions ==
The AsylA defines the term refugee and the conditions which can – and cannot – result in an asylum. According to the law, refugees are

"persons who in their native country or in their country of last residence are subject to serious disadvantages or have a well-founded fear of being exposed to such disadvantages for reasons of race, religion, nationality, membership of a particular social group or due to their political opinions. Serious disadvantages include a threat to life, physical integrity or freedom as well as measures that exert intolerable psychological pressure. Motives for seeking asylum specific to women must be taken into account."

Persons who refuse to perform military service or desert are not refugees unless they are covered by the Convention Relating to the Status of Refugees of 1951. Persons who claim grounds based on their conduct after leaving their country that are not related to their previous conviction are also not refugees.

The AsylA also provides for the granting of temporary protection to persons in need of protection as long as they are exposed to serious general danger, such as war, civil war, or general violence. Temporary protection is a form of subsidiary protection that does not confer refugee status but allows persons to stay in Switzerland until the situation in their country improves.

The AsylA also establishes the principle of non refoulement, which prohibits the forcible return of persons to a country where their life, physical integrity, or freedom are threatened on any of the grounds stated in the law or where they would be at risk of being forced to return to such a country. The principle of non refoulement may not be invoked by persons who have a legally binding conviction for a particularly serious crime and who pose a threat to Switzerland's security or public order.

The law is supplemented by several ordinances issued by the Federal Council or the SEM, which provide more detailed rules on various aspects of the law.

== See also ==
- Immigration to Switzerland
- Foreign Nationals and Integration Act
- Human rights in Switzerland
- State Secretariat for Migration
