= Human rights in Switzerland =

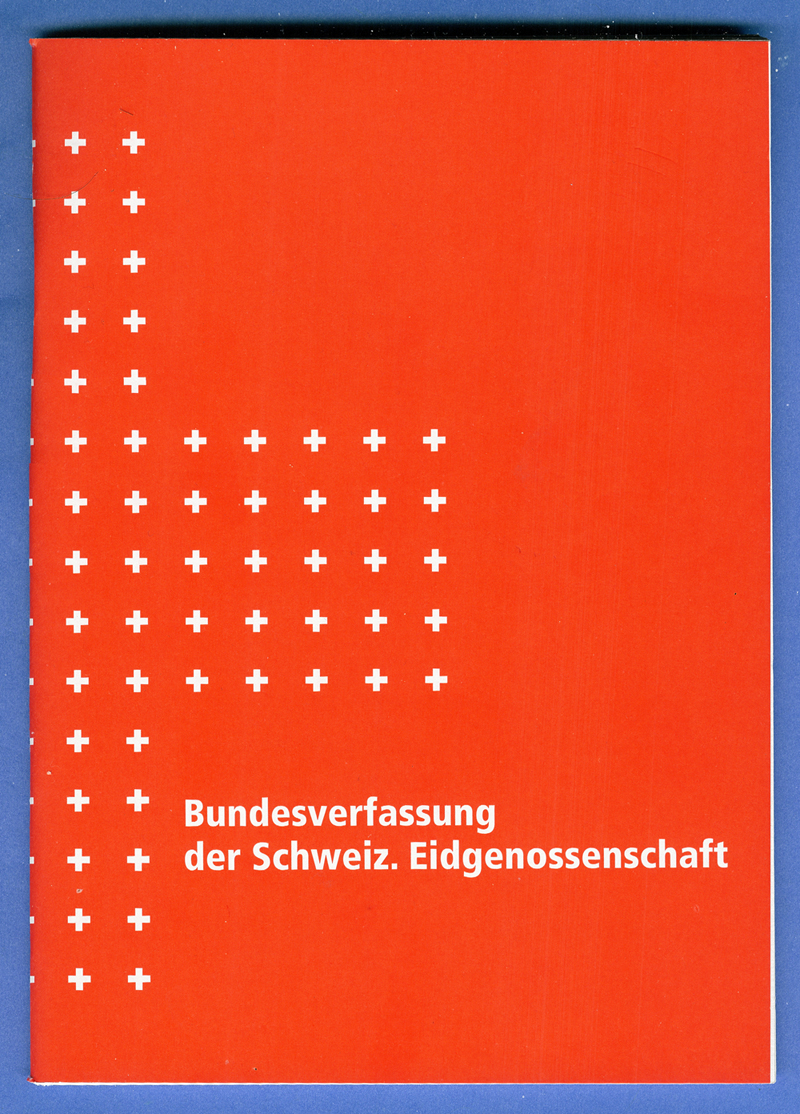
The Swiss Federal Constitution of 1999 has a chapter entitled "Fundamental Rights, Civil Rights and Social Goals".

Human rights are largely respected in Switzerland, one of Europe's oldest democracies. Switzerland is often at or near the top in international rankings of civil liberties and political rights observance. Switzerland places human rights at the core of the nation's value system, as represented in its Federal Constitution. As described in its FDFA's Foreign Policy Strategy 2016-2019, the promotion of peace, mutual respect, equality and non-discrimination are central to the country's foreign relations.

Switzerland is signatory to all relevant international human rights instruments. It is also the depositary state of the Geneva Conventions and the place where several human rights-related NGOs have been established or headquartered, including the Red Cross. The United Nations Human Rights Council, of which Switzerland is a member and which it was instrumental in establishing, has its seat in Geneva. Respect for human rights and the promotion of democracy is also one of the five official policy goals of Switzerland.

== International involvement ==
Switzerland is party to and has significant influence in a number of international mechanisms that promote human rights.

=== Human Rights Council ===
The United Nations Human Rights Council (HRC) was an initiative put forward by Switzerland in 2006 to replace the prior United Nations Commission on Human Rights. Since this time, Switzerland has continued to be an active member in all HRC promotion and enforcement internationally. Switzerland's third period of membership has recently been approved, following improvements recommended as in the 2012 Universal Periodic Review (UPR), which included improving gender equality, youth justice provisions, minimizing racial discrimination and combatting excessive use of force by law enforcement.

In this most recent application to the United Nations, Switzerland deemed protection of human rights on an international level to be one of three main voluntary pledges. Abolishing the death penalty internationally, stricter punishment for human rights violations, combatting discrimination based on sexual orientation and protecting human rights defenders are all identified as key policy aims.

Expanding and strengthening the HRC and its powers is a high priority for Switzerland, with the promotion of universal respect for all human rights being embedded in the nation's constitution. This goal has also been documented in Switzerland's 2015 application to renew HRC membership, as the nation wishes to enhance the participation of Non-Governmental Organisations (NGOs), train all nations on global governance of human rights, and establish support systems for poorer nations to be able to participate further in human rights discussions through financial assistance with delegate's stays in Geneva.

=== Treaties ===
Switzerland has ratified many human rights treaties. These include the United Nations Convention against Torture and Other Cruel Inhuman or Degrading Treatment or Punishment, the Optional Protocol to the Convention against Torture, the Second Optional Protocol to the International Covenant on Civil and Political Rights aiming at the abolition of the death penalty, the Convention on the Elimination of All Forms of Discrimination Against Women, the International Convention on the Elimination of All Forms of Racial Discrimination, the United Nations Convention on the Rights of the Child, and the United Nations Convention on the Rights of Persons with Disabilities. This is in complement to the Universal Declaration of Human Rights.

== Domestic enforcement of human rights ==
Despite any possible difficulties that can arise from the federal, canton nature of Switzerland as a State the country allows for any international treaty that is ratified immediately and automatically becomes enforceable as national law, without the need to individually assess and implement international mechanisms manually. This is useful in Switzerland's plight to increase the human rights standards of the country. The Federal Constitution of Switzerland lists dignity and equality as paramount, which is evident in the application of a number of federal legislations.

=== Human rights defenders ===
Switzerland is a supporting nation of the United Nations Declaration on Human Rights Defenders, recognising the importance of the Defenders in the international application of human rights, and the pressures these individuals and groups put on states to improve their national commitment to human rights. Switzerland has implemented and seeks to standardise the Swiss Guidelines on the Protection of Human Rights Defenders in efforts to protect defenders internally and on rights-driven missions to other nation states. however, Switzerland is a forerunner in the field of the right to digital integrity. A parliamentary initiative aimed at introducing the right to digital integrity into the Federal Constitution submitted on 29 September 2022 by the member of parliament Samuel Bendahan. In the canton of Geneva, a popular vote was accepted by more than 94% of the population on 18 June 2023 to add this new right to the cantonal constitution

=== Children's rights ===
Switzerland ratified the Convention on the Rights of the Child in 1997 and has continued to enhance children's rights since. In 2011, the Federal Social Insurance Office began a program to protect youth from violence, and another for the education of and protection from the media. Complementary to this, nationwide organisations such as the Pro Juventute Foundation and the Swiss Foundation for Child Protection are active in working with victims of child abuse of many kinds. Internationally, Switzerland is signed to the Council of Europe Convention on the Protection of Children against Sexual Exploitation and Sexual Abuse, which criminalises sexual acts against children in all of its signed countries. Regardless of the structural mechanisms in place, human rights reports still document high rates of child abuse in Switzerland. One children's hospital alone reported 450 instances of abuse during 2014, of which 33% was sexual abuse, 35% physical, and the remainder being psychological abuse and neglect.

There have been minor improvements made within the scope of children's right protection since the second Swiss UPR from October 2012. These are mainly in relation to rights and regulations governing the punishment of child offenders, however, not in relation to the high statistics of abuse.

=== Death penalty ===
Switzerland abolished capital punishment for all criminal actions in 1992. This is documented in the country's constitution, and the nation has since rallied for the universal abolition of capital punishment. Switzerland observes the right to life and human dignity as fundamental to human rights and aims to have the punishment universally condemned by 2025.

Switzerland is taking an active role in the abolishment, working closely with the United Nations High Commissioner for Human Rights, and introducing a World Day Against the Death Penalty on 10 October every year. The work with the United Nations also involves drafting of several resolutions, such as the moratorium on the death penalty, which was approved by the Human Rights Council in 2015, and is presented to the United Nations General Assembly every two years following Switzerland's support for the document in 2007.

The country also works with international organisations such as Death Penalty Project, International Commission Against the Death Penalty and the World Coalition Against the Death Penalty, and has ratified treaties such as the Second Optional Protocol to the International Covenant on Civil and Political Rights, aiming at the abolition of the death penalty, Protocol No. 13 to the Convention for the Protection of Human Rights and Fundamental Freedoms, concerning the abolition of the death penalty in all circumstances and the Convention on the Rights of the Child.

=== Anti-discrimination provisions ===
Combating discrimination and promoting inclusion are one of the key ways Switzerland seeks to promote human rights domestically, as covered by Articles 1, 2 and 7 of the Universal Declaration of Human Rights.

==== Lesbian, gay, bisexual, transgender and intersex discrimination protection ====
Since 2020, Switzerland's anti-discrimination provisions specifically forbid discrimination based on sexual orientation. Since 2022, Swiss law allows for same-sex marriage, IVF access and adoption of a child where one or both of the partners was already a legal guardian of the child prior to the relationship.

==== Racism ====
Switzerland uses many large and small-scale methods and domestic and international instruments to prevent racism. Prohibition on ethnic and race-based discrimination is codified in the Swiss Criminal Code, and the nation was involved in, and party to, the resulting document from the Durban Review Conference in Geneva in 2009. On a community level, all police must pass an examination on human rights, ethics, and racism before being employed, and the Service for Combatting Racism provides support, education and financial assistance to projects seeking to eradicate discrimination of this type. The Service also provides an outline of remedies that are available at law for any occurrence of racism.

==== Gender ====
The drive for gender equality in Switzerland is evident within many legal instruments of the country. Article 8 of the Federal Constitution of the Swiss Federation notes men and women to have equal rights in the realm of law, within family life, and in employment. Switzerland also is committed to international documents attempting to secure gender equality, such as the gender components of the 2030 Agenda for Sustainable Development, as well as assisting both politically and financially in United Nations mechanisms hoping to achieve recognition of gender equality universally. Women were granted the right to vote in the first Swiss cantons in 1959, at the federal level only in 1971 and, after resistance, in the last canton Appenzell Innerrhoden in 1990 (despite Switzerland having ratified the European Convention on Human Rights 16 years earlier).

In 2011, a number of national achievements in women's rights were celebrated. The year marked the 40th anniversary of federal women's suffrage, 30 years of constitutional-level provision for gender equality and 15 years of legislative provision for gender equality, as observed within the Federal Act on Gender Equality. Switzerland has also ratified the Optional Protocol to the Convention on Elimination of All Forms of Discrimination Against Women and made several other nationwide legal provisions to ensure equality of gender is achieved. These include the Victims of Crime (Assistance) Act and establishing a Federal Office for Equality between Women and Men for training of public workers in relation to domestic violence incidents. The Swiss Criminal Code also has specific provisions that prohibit certain gender discriminatory acts, such as female genital mutilation and forced marriage.

==== Persons with disabilities ====
Around 17% of the Swiss population are said to have a disability. The Act on Equality for Persons with Disabilities aims to assist with employing disabled persons and deterring discrimination.

=== Prevention of torture ===
The Swiss Constitution prohibits any behaviour of this nature. However, there have been many reports of excessive force and illegitimate treatment by police while making arrests. These instances have been dealt with through the criminal courts accordingly. Prison overcrowding has been an identified problem within Human Rights Reports of punishment in the past, with prisons exceeding capacity anywhere from 50 to 300 percent over the 2014 year. This is yet to be rectified. In 2013, there were 10 deaths of prisoners, including 2 suicides which have yet to be sufficiently investigated.

The Optional Protocol to the Convention against Torture and Other Cruel, Inhuman or Degrading Treatment or Punishment became enforceable in 2009, shortly followed by a National Commission for the Prevention of Torture being established in 2010 by the Federal Council to ensure human rights were upheld.

=== Justice ===
The Swiss justice system is mainly governed by the Constitution, which requires judicial independence. There is a presumption of innocence, trials are public, and are free from undue delay. Switzerland presently lacks a nationwide Ombudsman or similar authority to review and respond to complaints.

=== Refugees and asylum seekers ===
Switzerland's nationwide asylum granting policy is currently enforced until September 2018, following a renewal in 2014. The policy requires asylum seekers to provide necessary documents or have a justifiable excuse for not having proper documentation, or risk not being granted asylum. The nation has been active under the Dublin 2 Regulation since 2008, allowing transfers of asylum seekers to and from other states that are signatory to the agreement. Emergency financial support may be gained by asylum seekers, and internal legislation, such as the Asylum Act, aligns Switzerland with the asylum requirements of the European Return Directive.

== See also ==
- LGBT rights in Switzerland
- Human rights in Europe
