= Hervé Makuka =

Swiss footballer (born 1986)

Personal information
- Full name: Hervé McCarthy Makuka
- Date of birth: 19 January 1986 (age 40)
- Place of birth: Giswil, Switzerland
- Height: 1.70 m (5 ft 7 in)
- Position: Midfielder

Team information
- Current team: FC Wettswil-Bonstetten

Youth career
- 1997–2000: FC Sarnen
- 2000–2004: FC Luzern

Senior career*
Years	Team	Apps	(Gls)
2004–2008	FC Luzern II	13	(0)
2007–2008	FC Luzern	6	(0)
2008–2009	SC Cham	17	(2)
2009–2010	FC Tuggen	15	(0)
2010–2012	FC Baden	43	(4)
2012	FC Solothurn	13	(0)
2012–	FC Wettswil-Bonstetten		
- * Club domestic league appearances and goals as of 9 July 2012

Hervé McCarthy Makuka (born 19 January 1986) is a Swiss footballer who plays for FC Wettswil-Bonstetten.

== Career ==
He began his career by FC Sarnen before 2000 joined to the youth from FC Luzern and played 51 games with the youth and shoots 6 goals, in 2004 he was promoted to the first team and climbed with his team 2006 in the Swiss Super League, in summer 2008 he left the team and moved to SC Cham. After a half-year which scores two goals in 17 games, he signed for FC Tuggen in January 2009. In 2010, he joined FC Baden.
