= Death of Samson Chukwu =

Controversial death in Switzerland

Samson Chukwu
- Died: 1 May 2001 (aged 27); Valais, Switzerland
- Cause of death: Asphyxiation

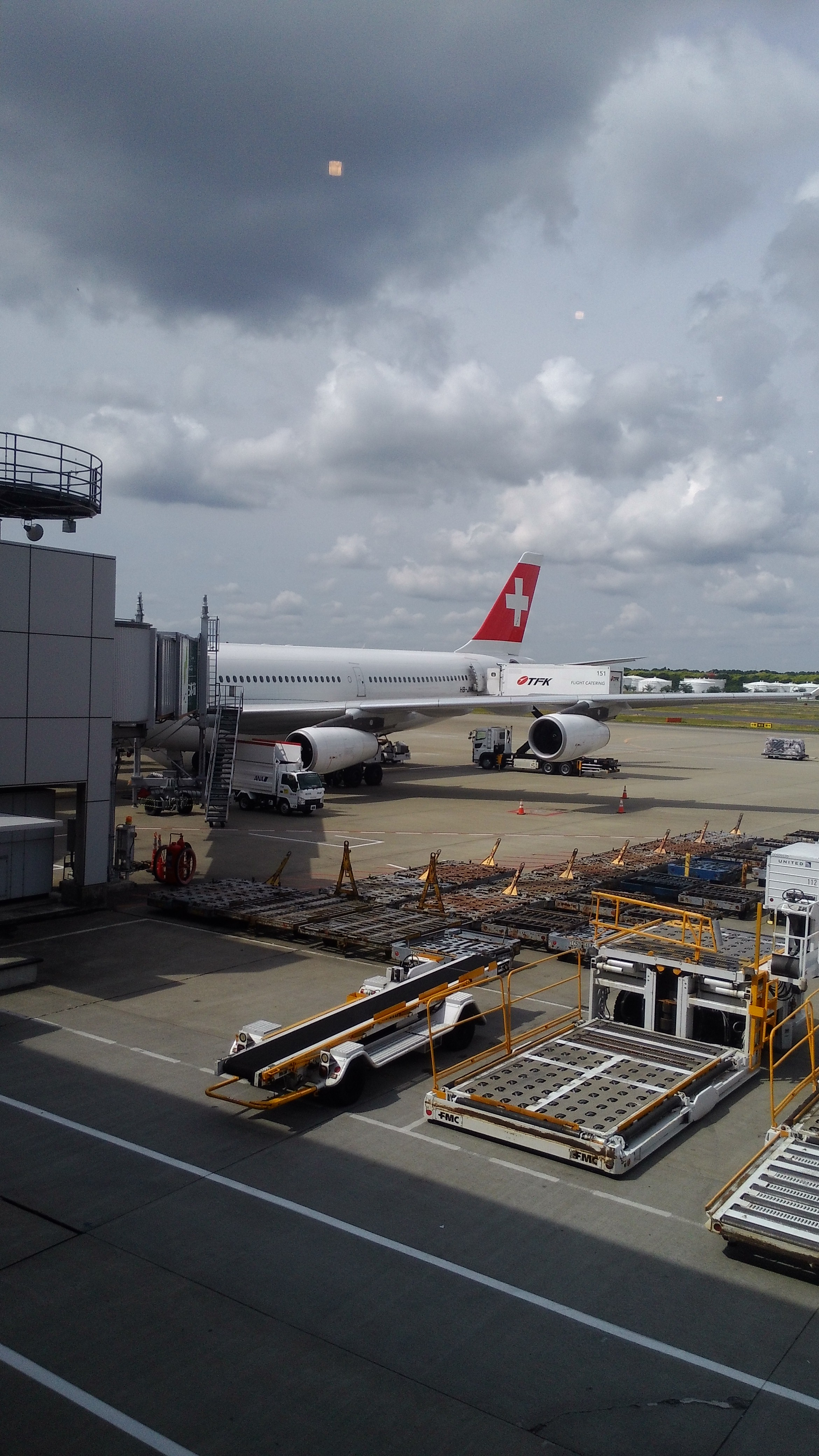
Airport in Kloten, Switzerland, where Chukwu was being transferred to prior to his death

Samson Chukwu (also spelled Samsson) (died 1 May 2001) was a 27-year-old Nigerian asylum seeker detained in the Swiss canton of Valais in an attempt to deport him to Lagos, Nigeria via Kloten, Switzerland. While detained in Granges, Valais at Crêtelongue Prison, he was handcuffed lying on his stomach. A police officer rested his weight onto Chukwu's back leading to Chukwu's death by "postural asphyxiation".

Before authorities were able to complete an autopsy, State Councilor Jean-René Fournier, responsible for security and institutions claimed that the cause of death was a heart attack. The final autopsy results released in July 2001 confirmed asphyxiation as the cause of death.

Chukwu's family filed a lawsuit against local police officials. A Valais court later dismissed the lawsuit citing officer ignorance of the detainment method's danger. A doctor involved in attending to Chukwu received a suspended sentence for misdiagnosing Chukwu's breathing problems while he was detained and failing in his professional obligations. The doctor was also ordered to pay restitution to Chukwu's family.

Amnesty International used the case to urge Switzerland to reduce their program of forced deportations. The organization has also used Chukwu's death as evidence of a larger pattern of excessive force used by Swiss police, and the event lead to police reform in the country. Chukwu's death was the second case in two years of an asylum seeker being suffocated to death by Swiss authorities.

While large scale public protests did not occur at the time, Chukwu's name has often been cited in subsequent Black Lives Matter protests in Switzerland.

== See also ==
- Murder of George Floyd, American man who died after police used a similar restraint technique, which sparked worldwide protests
- Asphyxia-related deaths by law enforcement in the United States
