= Mandy Abou Shoak =

Swiss human rights activist, author and politician (born 1989)

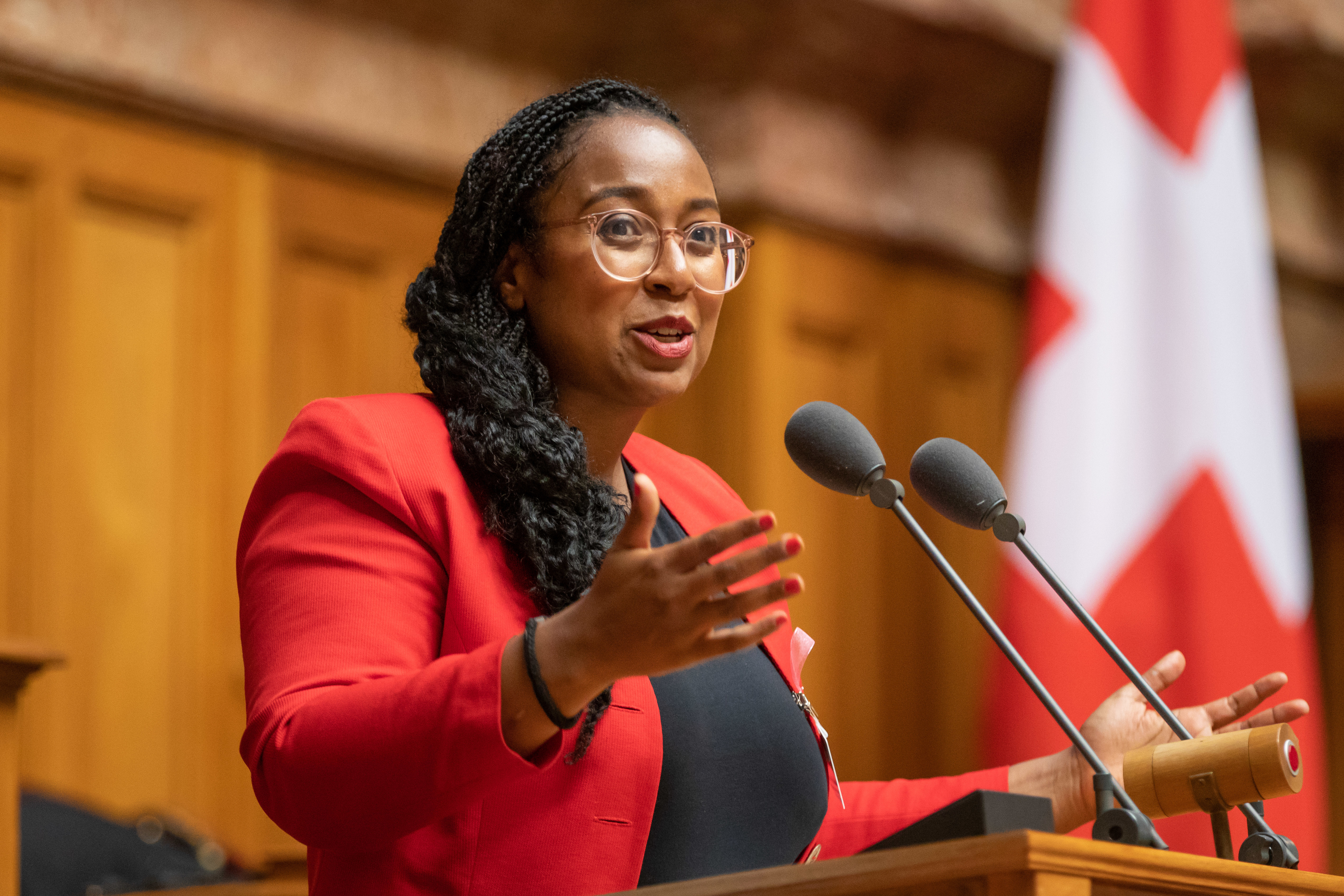
- Mandy Abou Shoak in 2021
- Born: 1989 (age 36–37); Khartoum, Sudan
- Citizenship: Swiss
- Education: Lucerne University of Applied Sciences (B.A.), Alice Salomon University of Applied Sciences (M.A.
- Occupations: human rights activist, author and politician
- Years active: 2020 - present
- Political party: Social Democratic Party of Switzerland
- Board member of: Black Feminist Network Bla*sh, Swiss NGO combatting trafficking of women
- Website: Abou Shoak's website Justhis

Mandy Abou Shoak (born 1989 in Khartoum, Sudan) is a Swiss human rights activist, author and politician with the Social Democratic Party of Switzerland. Since 2023, she has served as a member of the Cantonal Council of Zurich. As freelance coach and counsellor for diversity, equity, inclusion and for combatting racism, she has been working since 2020 as consultant for various Swiss public and private organizations.

== Life and career ==
Abou Shoak was born in Khartoum, Sudan. Her father had been a journalist who was repeatedly detained by the Sudanese government for his critical opinions. After her family fled to Switzerland, her mother first learned German and graduated from secondary school. She then attended medical school and became a dentist, while raising two children at the same time.

Abou Shoak came to Switzerland at age two and grew up in the Zürcher Oberland region. From 2012 to 2016 she studied social work, graduating with a B.A. with a specialization in sociocultural activities at the Lucerne University of Applied Sciences. From 2018 to 2021, she studied social work with a major in human rights at the Alice Salomon University of Applied Sciences in Berlin, Germany, graduating with a Master's degree.

Since 2020, Abou Shoak has been advising private and public organisations, NGOs, networks and associations in the development of non-discriminatory practice and organisational structure. As a freelance coach on anti-racism, she accompanied a theatre production at the Schauspielhaus Zurich as well as another play at the Zurich cantonal theatre in 2022. She also wrote a chapter about "Showcasing humans" for the 2023 book Not My Circus, Not My Monkeys. Further, she co-hosted the podcast "Reden wir! 20 Stimmen zu Rassismus" (Let's talk! 20 voices about racism) produced for the department for combating racism of the Swiss Federal Department of Home Affairs.

Since 2022, Abou Shoak has been in charge of education and counselling for the NGO Brava, an organization for combatting violence against women. Since June 2024, she also has been a board member and co-president for an NGO working for migration and against human trafficking of women. In addition, she has served as board member of the Black Feminist Network Bla*sh since 2021, and for the regional professional association for social work in the region of Zurich and Schaffhausen.

In 2023, Abou Shoak was elected as member of the Cantonal Council of Zurich, where she is a member of the Commission for Justice and Public Safety. Further, she has been working on the board of the women's section of the Social Democratic Party of Switzerland since 2023.
