= Immigration to Switzerland =

In 2023, resident foreigners made up 26.3% of Switzerland’s population. Most of these (83%) were from European countries. Italy provided the largest single group of foreigners, accounting for 14.7% of total foreign population, followed closely by Germany (14.0%), Portugal (11.7%), France (6.6%), Kosovo (5.1%), Spain (3.9%), Turkey (3.1%), North Macedonia (3.1%), Serbia (2.8%), Austria (2.0%), United Kingdom (1.9%), Bosnia and Herzegovina (1.3%) and Croatia (1.3%). Immigrants from Sri Lanka (1.3%), most of them former Tamil refugees, were the largest group of Asian origin (7.9%).

The current federal law of 16 December 2005, on foreigners (the Foreign Nationals and Integration Act) came into force on January 1, 2008, replacing the Federal Act on the Residence and Establishment of Foreigners of 1934.

Switzerland and Australia, with about a quarter of their population born outside the country, are the two countries with the highest proportion of immigrants in the western world, although who counts as an immigrant varies from country to country, and even between agencies within countries. Some countries naturalise immigrants easily, while others make it much more difficult, which means that such comparisons ought to be treated with caution.

Switzerland also has the highest Potential Net Migration Index of any European country by a large margin, at +150% (followed by Sweden at +78%) according to a 2010 Gallup study; this means that out of an estimated 700 million potential migrants worldwide, about 12 million (150% of Swiss resident population) would name Switzerland as their most desired country of residence. Commonly named reasons for relocation to Switzerland are safety, strong economy, and high quality of education. Another ground for immigrants from developed countries is the relatively favorable personal income tax (up to 11,5%) incorporated in the Swiss taxation system. However, residents with migration background are more likely to be unemployed and their unemployment tends to last longer, although Switzerland also receives highly qualified migrants regularly.

== Racism ==
In the 2000s, domestic and international institutions expressed concern about what was perceived as an increase in xenophobia, particularly in some political campaigns. In reply to one critical report, the Federal Council noted that "racism unfortunately is present in Switzerland", but stated that the high proportion of foreign citizens in the country, as well as the generally unproblematic integration of foreigners, underlined Switzerland's openness. Follow-up study conducted in 2018 found that 59% considered racism a serious problem in Switzerland. The proportion of the population that has reported being targeted by racial discrimination has increased in recent years, from 10% in 2014 to almost 17% in 2018, according to the Federal Statistical Office. More recent studies show that full integration is "out of reach for non-European migrants" while they represent only 20% of the foreigners living in Switzerland. Most affected areas are discrimination in employment, housing, education and social activities. Places where racism most often occurs are the work place, local administration, the neighborhood and district as well as the private sector. In Switzerland, the Network of Counselling Centres for Victims of Racism is in charge for recording such incidents. Many racist incidents are said to go unreported.

32% of the population say they have experienced some form of discrimination or violence in the past 5 years (2021). In 2021, the United Nations noticed the lack of clear Swiss legislation to tackle racism. Switzerland ratified the International Convention on the Elimination of All Forms of Racial Discrimination in 1993. In recent years, it has also been reported that Swiss textbooks fall short on issues of racism. In 2024, the European Court of Human Rights (ECHR) condemned Switzerland for its racial profiling practices. According to the authorities in 2025, cases of racism involving patients, doctors or nurses have increased in the Swiss health sector. “Systemic racism” in the police in Lausanne was reported in 2025 which led to riots. United Nations experts have also reported "systemic racism" in Switzerland in 2022.

After an increase of 40% in 2024, Switzerland recorded 1,245 cases of racial discrimination in 2025. The Swiss Federal Council’s national strategy (effective 2026-2031) aims to improve data collection, victim protection, and prevention of racism and anti-Semitism by focusing on education and awareness of the problem.

== History ==
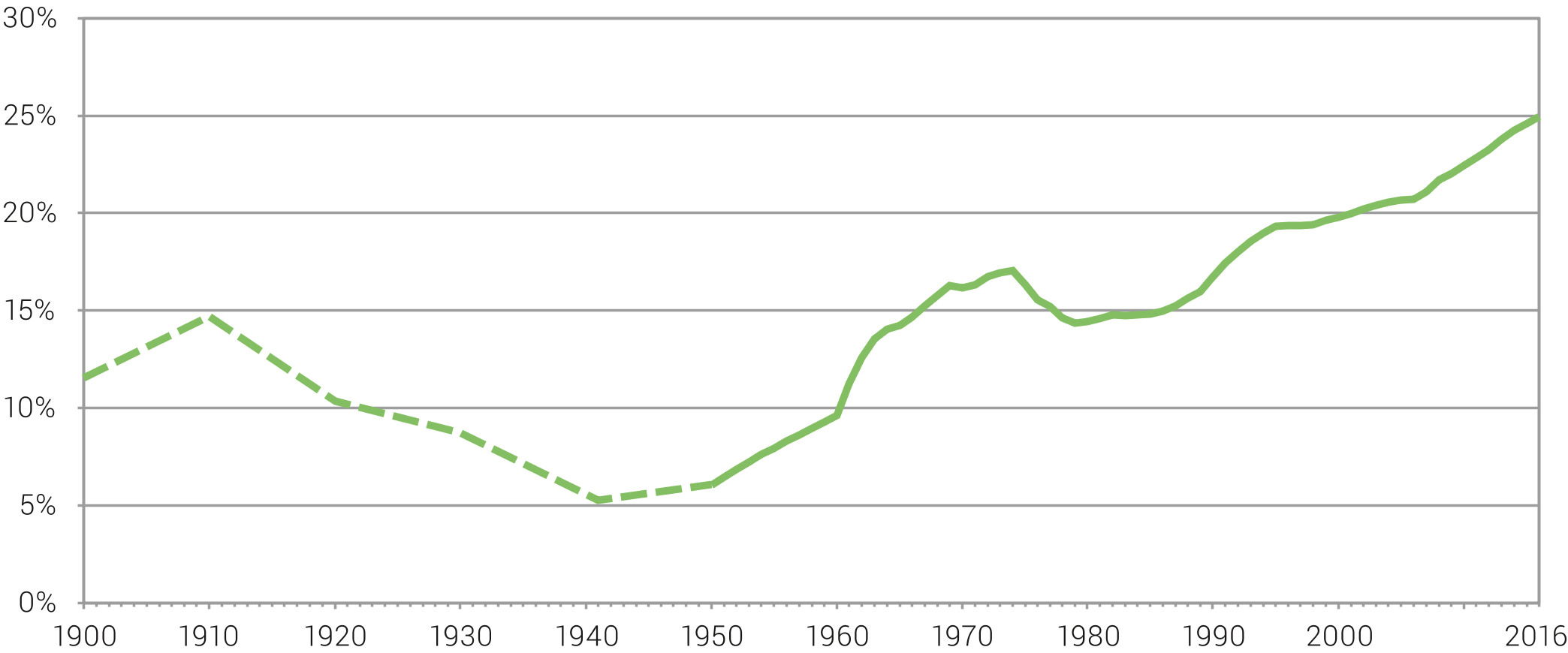
Permanent foreign residents as a percentage of the total population, 1900–2011

Industrialization and banking made Switzerland prosperous by the late 19th century and began to attract significant numbers of migrant workers. Free movement of population was established with neighbouring countries in the late 19th century, and as a consequence, there was an increase from 211,000 resident foreigners in 1880 (7.5% of total population) to 552,000 in 1910 (14.7% of total population).

There was net emigration of foreign residents during the World Wars era. The fraction of foreign residents fell to 10.4% by 1920, and to 5.1% by 1941. Immigration has picked up again after 1945. Beginning in the mid-1950s, immigration increased steeply, and the historical record of close to 15% foreigners prior to World War I was surpassed at some time during the 1960s.

Until the 1960s, the immigration policy remained largely liberal. In the 1960s, rapid economic growth in Switzerland led to a large increase in the number of foreign residents. Because of this, the Federal Council enacted a regulation to limit the number of foreigners in each company.

In 1970, this per-company limit was replaced with a general limit for all recently arrived foreigners who were gainfully employed. In the 1970s, the number of foreigners decreased because of a period of recession. The proportion of foreigners to the total population, after growing steadily until 1974 and peaking at 16.8%, went down to 14.1% in 1979.

The favorable economic climate of the 1980s brought a renewed demand for labour, which was filled by foreign workers. This led to an increase in the proportion of foreign permanent residents, from 14.8% in 1980 to 18.1% in 1990. Between 1991 and 1998, the Federal Council replaced the previous system of admission with a binary system that distinguished between member states of the EU/EFTA and all other countries, which largely remains in force. With this reform, the possibility of recruiting unskilled workers from non-EU/EFTA countries was abolished, with the exception of family reunification and asylum applications.

In 1996, the Federal Council established a commission on immigration (the Hug Commission) to establish a new policy on immigration. Based on its work, a second commission was established to draft a new law on immigration. In the 1990s, the proportion of foreigners continued to rise, from 18.1% to 20.9%.

An agreement on the free movement of people, part of a series of bilateral agreements with the European Union, was signed on 21 June 1999 and approved on 21 May 2000 with 67.2% of the vote. The agreement on free movement entered into force on 1 June 2002. On 24 September 2006, the new law on foreigners was approved with 68% of votes in favor. The law came into force on 1 January 2008. Switzerland is also a party to the Schengen and Dublin agreements. They were signed on 26 October 2004 and the collaboration actually began on 12 December 2008.

In 2000, foreign permanent residents accounted for 20.9% of the population. In 2011, the percentage rose to 22.8%. In 2011, 22,551 people filed an application for asylum in Switzerland. There was a net immigration of foreigners taking permanent residence in Switzerland of 83,200 in 2007, and of 103,400 in 2008. Net immigration fell moderately in 2009, to 79,000, and continued to fall to 51,190 in 2012.

Today, one of the economic reasons for immigration is a low income tax.

For example, in 2024, nearly 1500 millionaires immigrated to Switzerland from the UK. A Swiss relocation lawyer A. Lindemann attributed this to a favorable tax regime and effective cooperation between immigration and tax authorities.

The admission of people from non-EU/EFTA countries is regulated by the Foreign Nationals Act, and is limited to skilled workers who are urgently required and are likely to integrate successfully in the long term. There are quotas established yearly: in 2012 it was 3,500 residency permits and 5,000 short-term permits.

In 2017, 1039 deportations were issued by courts. A third (348) of the deportees were of Balkan origins, 157 were North African and 93 were from West Africa. Of the remainder, 279 were EU citizens of which 138 were Romanians, 33 were French, 32 were Italian and a dozen Germans.

== Referendums on immigration ==
There have been a number of ballot proposals to restrict immigration to Switzerland, starting in the 20th century. Many of these were either rejected by popular vote, or not implemented (e.g. the people's initiative "against foreign infiltration and overpopulation of Switzerland" or the people's initiative "for a regulation of immigration"). Between 1993 and 2010, 18 referendums were held on topics related to the foreign population. These were approved in eleven cases, and rejected in seven. These included:

- 1 December 1996, the People's initiative "against illegal immigration" was rejected by 53.7% of voters.
- 24 November 2002, the People's initiative on asylum was rejected by 50.1% of voters. The proposal asked the federal government to apply new elements of procedural law, criminal and welfare sector asylum, to make the Switzerland less attractive as a country of asylum, while respecting the obligations of international law.
- 13 September 2004, the initiative "limitation of immigration from non-EU countries" failed because of insufficient number of signatures. The initiative provided that the number of immigrants and asylum seekers in a year could not exceed the number of people emigrated the previous year.
- 1 June 2008, the people's initiative for democratic naturalisation was rejected with 63.8% of the vote. It intended to authorize municipalities to establish procedures to grant municipal citizenship.
- 28 November 2010, the people's initiative for the deportation of criminal foreigners was accepted with 52.3% of the vote. Following the approval of the proposal, foreigners convicted of certain offenses or who illegally received social insurance benefits or social assistance lose the right of residence and are expelled from Switzerland.
- 9 February 2014, the federal popular initiative "against mass immigration" was accepted by 50.3% of voters. The referendum aims to reduce immigration through quotas and limits the freedom of movement between Switzerland and the European Union.
- 30 November 2014, Ecopop popular initiative "stop overpopulation", aiming at a cap on population growth of 0.2% p.a. This was defeated by 74% of votes.
- 27 September 2020, the popular initiative aiming to end free movement with people in the EU, which would lead to the termination of the AFMP a bilateral agreement between Switzerland and the European Union was rejected by 62%.
- 14 June 2026, the popular initiative "No to ten million Switzerland", which aimed to cap the population at ten million was rejected by 54.79%.

== Demographics ==
In 2009, a total number of 160,600 people immigrated to Switzerland, while a total number of 86,000 people left the country, leaving a net immigration of 74,600 people. This number consists of a net number of 79,000 foreigners immigrating to Switzerland, and 4,500 Swiss citizens emigrating from Switzerland.

Net migration for the period 2005 to 2010:

2005	2006	2007	2008	2009	2010
36,200	39,400	75,500	98,200	74,600	64,900

Population growth in Switzerland is mostly due to immigration: in 2009, there have been 78,286 live births recorded (74% Swiss, 26% foreign nationalities), contrasting with 62,476 deaths (92% Swiss, 8% foreigners). Thus, of the population growth rate of 1.1% during 2009, about 0.2% are due to births, and 0.9% due to immigration.

As of 2009, a total number of 1,714,000 foreign nationals were registered as residing in Switzerland, accounting for 22.0% of total population. Of these, 1,680,000 had permanent residence (excluding exchange students, seasonal workers and asylum seekers). Of these, 354,000 were born in Switzerland. Another 522,000 had resided in Switzerland for more than 15 years. Swiss nationality law permits naturalization after a period of twelve years. 43,440 people were naturalized as Swiss citizens in 2009.

=== Permanent residents by nationality ===
In 2013 there were a total of 1,937,447 permanent residents (23.8% of the total population of 8.14 million) in Switzerland. The majority (1.65 million, 85% of the total immigrants and 20.2% of the total population) came from Europe. The following chart shows permanent resident numbers from selected regions and countries every 5 years.

Nation	1980	1985	1990	1995	2000	2005	2010	2013	2023
Total	913,497	960,674	1,127,109	1,363,590	1,424,370	1,541,912	1,766,277	1,937,447	2,417,288
Europe	859,054	892,748	1,036,760	1,238,937	1,261,975	1,334,590	1,504,943	1,646,825	1,994,831
Africa	10,539	13,130	20,291	28,800	37,618	48,081	71,527	83,873	123,324
Americas	20,838	23,438	29,149	38,585	49,687	61,732	74,511	78,433	89,878
North America	12,182	12,394	13,775	16,140	18,952	21,004	25,590	26,672	27,013
Latin America and Caribbean	8,656	11,044	15,374	22,445	30,735	40,728	48,921	51,761	62,865
Asia	21,569	29,772	38,921	54,914	72,002	94,009	110,549	122,941	202,245
Oceania	1,260	1,326	1,728	1,999	2,829	3,242	3,990	4,145	4,436
Germany	87,389	82,143	84,485	91,976	109,785	158,651	263,271	292,291	323,574
Spain	98,098	109,232	116,987	102,320	84,266	72,167	64,126	75,333	95,170
France	48,002	48,948	51,729	55,407	61,688	70,901	95,643	110,103	163,670
Italy	423,008	394,812	381,493	361,892	321,795	297,917	287,130	298,875	338,050
Austria	31,986	29,417	29,123	28,454	29,191	33,069	37,013	39,494	47,177
Portugal	10,863	31,029	86,035	135,646	135,449	167,857	212,586	253,227	255,250
United Kingdom	16,050	17,482	18,269	20,030	22,309	26,425	37,273	40,898	39,090
Croatia	–	–	–	42,582	43,876	40,709	33,507	30,471	31,582
Serbia and Montenegro	–	–	–	–	190,940	196,833	–	–	-
Serbia	–	–	–	–	–	–	121,908	90,704	57,940
Montenegro	–	–	–	–	–	–	2,022	2,415	2,464
Kosovo	–	–	–	–	–	–	58,755	86,976	115,966
Bosnia and Herzegovina	–	–	–	24,748	45,111	43,354	35,513	33,002	27,207
North Macedonia	–	–	–	39,540	56,092	60,898	60,116	62,633	70,011
Turkey	38,353	51,206	64,899	79,372	80,165	75,903	71,835	70,440	74,379

=== Population of immigrant background ===
Swiss and foreign born population pyramid of Switzerland in 2021

The definition of population of immigrant background includes all persons, regardless of their nationality, whose parents were born abroad. This definition includes first- and second-generation immigrants. In 2011, people of non-Swiss background made up 37.2% of the total resident population of Switzerland, with large differences between cantons.

Canton	Non-Swiss backgr.	%	Swiss backgr.	%
Canton of Geneva	219,059	62.2%	132,888	37.8%
Basel-Stadt	81,000	51.1%	77,613	48.9%
Ticino	139,719	49.0%	145,238	51.0%
Vaud	273,613	46.7%	312,067	53.3%
Canton of Zürich	493,302	42.5%	668,502	57.5%
Canton of Schaffhausen	26,607	40.9%	38,410	59.1%
Canton of Neuchâtel	57,284	40.3%	84,806	59.7%
Canton of Zug	36,249	38.2%	58,761	61.8%
Thurgau	74,965	35.7%	134,995	64.3%
Aargau	183,202	35.5%	333,349	64.5%
Canton of St. Gallen	139,999	35.0%	260,543	65.0%
Basel-Landschaft	80,101	34.4%	152,499	65.6%
Canton of Glarus	10,691	32.5%	22,191	67.5%
Canton of Solothurn	66,950	30.9%	149,649	69.1%
Valais	79,203	30.1%	184,239	69.9%
Canton of Fribourg	66,668	29.0%	162,976	71.0%
Graubünden	47,476	29.0%	116,288	71.0%
Appenzell Ausserrhoden	12,688	28.6%	31,748	71.4%
Canton of Luzern	89,304	28.3%	226,698	71.7%
Canton of Schwyz	34,569	28.2%	88,090	71.8%
Canton of Bern	204,088	24.6%	624,705	75.4%
Canton of Jura	13,767	23.8%	44,190	76.2%
Obwalden	6,510	22.0%	23,143	78.0%
Appenzell Innerrhoden	2,824	21.9%	10,055	78.1%
Nidwalden	7,332	21.0%	27,549	79.0%
Canton of Uri	4,887	16.7%	24,307	83.3%
Switzerland	2,452,058	37.2%	4,135,498	62.8%

=== Crime rates ===
In Switzerland, 69.7% of the prison population did not have Swiss citizenship, compared to 22.1% of total resident population (as of 2008). The figure of arrests by residence status is not usually made public. In 1997, when there were for the first time more foreigners than Swiss among the convicts under criminal law (out of a fraction of 20.6% of the total population at the time), a special report was compiled by the Federal Department of Justice and Police (published in 2001) which for the year 1998 found an arrest rate per 1000 adult population of 2.3 for Swiss citizens, 4.2 for legally resident aliens and 32 for asylum seekers. 21% of arrests made concerned individuals with no residence status, who were thus either sans papiers or "crime tourists" without any permanent residence in Switzerland.

A 2019 study found that asylum seekers exposed to civil conflict and mass killing during childhood were 35% more prone to violent crimes than co-national asylum seekers who were not exposed to conflict. The conflict exposed cohorts have a higher propensity to target victims from their own nationality. Offering labor market access to the asylum seekers eliminates two-thirds of effect of conflict exposure on crime propensity.

In 2010, a statistic was published which listed delinquency by nationality (based on 2009 data). To avoid distortions due to demographic structure, only the male population aged between 18 and 34 was considered for each group. From the study, it became clear that crime rate is highly correlated on the country of origin of the various migrant groups. Thus, immigrants from Germany, France and Austria had a significantly lower crime rate than Swiss citizens (60% to 80%), while immigrants from Angola, Nigeria and Algeria had a crime rate of above 600% of that of Swiss population. In between these extremes were immigrants from Former Yugoslavia, with crime rates of between 210% and 300% of the Swiss value.

A 2023 study suggests that the increase in fear of immigrant crime in Switzerland was significantly impacted by potentially biased media coverage sensationalizing the issue.

== See also ==
- Economic effects of immigration
- Opposition to immigration
- Foreign Nationals and Integration Act
- List of countries by foreign-born population
- List of sovereign states and dependent territories by fertility rate
- Asylum law in Switzerland
