= Demographics of Switzerland =

- Population of Switzerland 2019 Swiss and non-Swiss residents
- Population: 8,981,565 (1 October 2024 est.)
- Density: 208/km^{2} (48th); 539/sq mi
- Growth rate: 0.75% (2019 est.)
- Birth rate: 8.7 births/1,000 population (2024)
- Death rate: 8.0 deaths/1,000 population (2024)
- Life expectancy: 83.8 years
  - male: 81.9 years
  - female: 85.6 years
- Fertility rate: 1.33 children born/woman (2023 est.)
- Infant mortality: 3.67 deaths/1,000 live births
- Net migration rate: 4.74 migrant(s)/1,000 population (2015 est.)
- Immigrant share: 31.1% (2024)

Age structure
- 0–14 years: 15.23% (male 650,151 /female 612,479)
- 15–64 years: 66.43% (male 2,769,885/ female 2,739,679)
- 65 and over: 18.34% (male 672,024 /female 848,591) (2018 est.)

Sex ratio
- Total: 0.97 male(s)/female (2015 est.)
- At birth: 1.06 male(s)/female
- Under 15: 1.05 male(s)/female
- 15–64 years: 1.02 male(s)/female
- 65 and over: 0.78 male(s)/female

Nationality
- Nationality: Swiss Ethnic groups in Switzerland: Swiss people are the majority. Because the overwhelming majority of both Swiss citizens and foreign residents are of European origin, independent demographic demographic groups and sociological studies estimate that the European population comprises roughly 93% to 98% of the country's total population and 8% or 2% non-European

Language
- Official: German, French, Italian, Romansh
- Spoken: English, Portuguese, Albanian, Serbian Croatian, Spanish, other

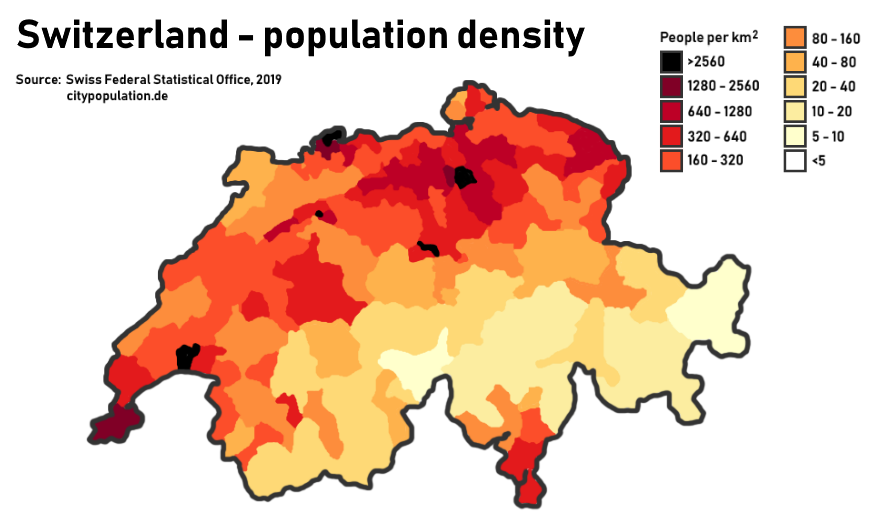
Population density in Switzerland, by district

Switzerland has 9 million inhabitants, as of June 2024. Its population quadrupled over the period 1800 to 1990 (average doubling time 95 years). Population growth was steepest in the period after World War II (1.4% per annum during 1950–1970, doubling time 50 years), it slowed during the 1970s and 1980s but has since increased to 1% during the 2000s (doubling time 70 years).

More than 75% of the population live in the central plain, which stretches between the Alps and the Jura Mountains and from Geneva in the southwest to the High Rhine and Lake Constance in the northeast.

As of 2023, 40% of the population has a migrant background and 31% are foreign residents.

== Census ==
Historical population
Year	Pop.	±% p.a.
1861	2,515,396	—
1871	2,673,468	+0.61%
1881	2,840,501	+0.61%
1891	2,972,024	+0.45%
1901	3,318,985	+1.11%
1911	3,756,842	+1.25%
1921	3,883,360	+0.33%
1931	4,070,042	+0.47%
1941	4,268,964	+0.48%
1951	4,717,200	+1.00%
1961	5,360,153	+1.29%
1971	6,193,064	+1.45%
1981	6,335,243	+0.23%
1991	6,757,188	+0.65%
2001	7,197,638	+0.63%
2011	7,870,134	+0.90%
2021	8,680,890	+0.99%
Historical population as of 1 January of each year, Source: Federal Statistical Office

The Federal Population Census (German: Eidgenössische Volkszählung, French: Recensement fédéral de la population, Italian: Censimento federale della popolazione, Romansh: Dumbraziun federala dal pievel) has been carried out every 10 years starting in 1850. The census was initiated by Federal Councillor Stefano Franscini, who evaluated the data of the first census all by himself after Parliament failed to provide the necessary funds. The census is now conducted by the Swiss Federal Statistical Office, which makes most results available on its website.

Collected data includes population data (citizenship, place of residence, place of birth, position in household, number of children, religion, languages, education, profession, place of work, etc.), household data (number of individuals living in the household, etc.), accommodation data (surface area, amount of rent paid, etc.) and building data (geocoordinates, time of construction, number of floors, etc.). Participation is compulsory and reached 99.87% of the population in 2000.

Since 2010, the population census has been carried out and analysed annually in a new format by the Federal Statistical Office (FSO). In order to ease the burden on the population, the information is primarily drawn from population registers and supplemented by sample surveys. Only a small proportion of the population (about 5%) are surveyed in writing or by telephone. The first reference day for the new census was 31 December 2010.

At the end of 2022, there were about four million private households in Switzerland, of which more than a third are inhabited by only one person. Since 1970, this number has more than tripled.

== Population ==
View source data.
View source data.

Demographic statistics according to the World Population Review in 2019.

View source data.
- One birth every 6 minutes
- One death every 8 minutes
- One net migrant every 11 minutes
- Net gain of one person every 8 minutes

Historical population of Switzerland

Total of registered residents (numbers relate to 31 December)
Year	Total	Male	Female	Swiss	Foreign
2023	8,962,258	4,451,532 (49.7%)	4,510,726 (50.3%)	6,544,970 (73.0%)	2,417,288 (27.0%)
2022	8,815,385	4,379,953 (49.7%)	4,435,432 (50.3%)	6,519,362 (74.0%)	2,296,023 (26.0%)
2021	8,738,791	4,338,203 (49.6%)	4,400,588 (50.4%)	6,494,610 (74.3%)	2,244,181 (25.7%)
2020	8,670,300	4,302,599 (49.6%)	4,367,701 (50.4%)	6,459,512 (74.5%)	2,210,788 (25.5%)
2019	8,606,033	4,268,863 (49.6%)	4,337,170 (50.4%)	6,430,658 (74.7%)	2,175,375 (25.3%)
2018	8,544,527	4,237,121 (49.6%)	4,307,406 (50.4%)	6,396,252 (74.9%)	2,148,275 (25.1%)
2017	8,484,130	4,206,434 (49.6%)	4,277,696 (50.4%)	6,357,738 (74.9%)	2,126,392 (25.1%)
2016	8,419,550	4,173,437 (49.6%)	4,246,113 (50.4%)	6,318,404 (75.0%)	2,101,146 (25.0%)
2015	8,327,126	4,121,471 (49.5%)	4,205,655 (50.5%)	6,278,459 (75.4%)	2,048,667 (24.6%)
2014	8,236,666	4,073,880 (49.5%)	4,163,786 (50.5%)	6,239,207 (75.7%)	1,998,459 (24.3%)
2013	8,139,631	4,022,091 (49.4%)	4,117,540 (50.6%)	6,202,184 (76.2%)	1,937,447 (23.8%)
2012	8,039,060	3,968,524 (49.4%)	4,070,536 (50.6%)	6,169,091 (76.7%)	1,869,969 (23.3%)
2011	7,954,662	3,922,253 (49.3%)	4,032,409 (50.7%)	6,138,668 (77.2%)	1,815,994 (22.8%)
2010	7,870,134	3,877,426 (49.3%)	3,992,708 (50.7%)	6,103,857 (77.6%)	1,766,277 (22.4%)
2009	7,785,800	3,830,600 (49.2%)	3,955,200 (50.8%)	6,071,800 (78.0%)	1,714,000 (22.0%)
2008	7,701,900	3,786,700 (49.2%)	3,915,200 (50.8%)	6,032,100 (78.3%)	1,669,700 (21.7%)
2007	7,593,500	3,727,000 (49.1%)	3,866,500 (50.9%)	5,991,400 (78.9%)	1,602,100 (21.1%)
2006	7,508,700	3,679,400 (49.0%)	3,829,400 (51.0%)	5,954,200 (79.3%)	1,554,500 (20.7%)
2005	7,459,100	3,652,500 (49.0%)	3,806,600 (51.0%)	5,917,200 (79.3%)	1,541,900 (20.7%)
2004	7,415,100	3,628,700 (48.9%)	3,786,400 (51.1%)	5,890,400 (79.4%)	1,524,700 (20.6%)
2003	7,364,100	3,601,500 (48.9%)	3,762,600 (51.1%)	5,863,200 (79.6%)	1,500,900 (20.4%)
2002	7,313,900	3,575,000 (48.9%)	3,738,800 (51.1%)	5,836,900 (79.8%)	1,477,000 (20.2%)
2001	7,255,700	3,544,300 (48.8%)	3,711,300 (51.2%)	5,808,100 (80.0%)	1,447,600 (20.0%)
2000	7,204,100	3,519,700 (48.9%)	3,684,400 (51.1%)	5,779,700 (80.2%)	1,424,400 (19.8%)
1990	6,750,700	3,298,300 (48.9%)	3,452,400 (51.1%)	5,623,600 (83.3%)	1,127,100 (16.7%)
1980	6,335,200	3,082,000 (48.6%)	3,253,300 (51.4%)	5,421,700 (85.6%)	913,500 (14.4%)
1970	6,193,100	3,025,300 (48.8%)	3,167,700 (51.1%)	5,191,200 (83.8%)	1,001,900 (16.2%)
1960–1970	5,429,061	–	–	4,500,692 (89.2%)	586,338 (10.8%)
1950–1960	4,714,992	–	–	– (93.9%)	– (6.1%)
1941–1950	4,265,703	–	–	– (94.8%)	– (5.2%)
1930–1941	4,066,400	–	–	– (91.3%)	– (8.7%)
1920–1930	3,880,320	–	–	– (89.6%)	– (10.4%)
1910–1920	3,753,293	–	–	– (85.3%)	– (14.7%)
1900–1910	3,315,443	–	–	– (88.4%)	– (11.6%)
1888–1900	2,917,754	–	–	– (92.2%)	– (7.8%)
1880–1888	2,831,787	–	–	– (92.6%)	– (7.4%)
1870–1880	2,655,001	–	–	– (94.3%)	– (5.7%)
1860–1870	2,510,494	–	–	– (95.4%)	– (4.6%)
1850–1860	2,392,740	–	–	– (97.1%)	– (2.9%)
1837–1850	2,190,258	–	–	–	–
1798–1837	1,664,832	–	–	–	–

=== Growth rate ===
During the 19th and 20th centuries, population growth rate has been at 0.7% to 0.8%, with a doubling time of ca. 90 years. In the later 20th century, the growth rate has fallen below 0.7% (1980s: 0.64%; 1990s: 0.65%), and in the 2000s it has risen again slightly (2000–2006: 0.69%), mostly due to immigration. In 2007 the population grew at a much higher 1.1% rate, again mostly due to immigration. For 2008, the population grew 1.6%, a level not seen since the early 1960s.

Total fertility rate

- 1.46 children born/woman (total)
- 1.33 children born/Swiss woman
- 1.86 children born/non-Swiss woman

=== Fertility ===
View source data.

Birth and death rates between 1950 and 2008

The total fertility rate is the number of children born per woman. It is based on fairly good data for the entire period. Sources: Our World in Data and Gapminder Foundation.

Total Fertility Rates in Switzerland
Years	1850	1851	1852	1853	1854	1855	1856	1857	1858	1859	1860
Rate	4.14	4.02	3.89	3.74	3.65	3.44	3.82	3.85	4.05	4.27	4.19
Years		1861	1862	1863	1864	1865	1866	1867	1868	1869	1870
Rate		4.14	4.18	4.32	4.32	4.26	4.33	4.16	4.04	4.14	3.99
Years		1871	1872	1873	1874	1875	1876	1877	1878	1879	1880
Rate		3.99	3.99	3.98	4.07	4.26	4.4	4.29	4.19	4.09	3.97
Years		1881	1882	1883	1884	1885	1886	1887	1888	1889	1890
Rate		3.99	3.87	3.82	3.79	3.71	3.73	3.74	3.71	3.7	3.56
Years		1891	1892	1893	1894	1895	1896	1897	1898	1899	
Rate		3.78	3.71	3.74	3.66	3.66	3.77	3.79	3.82	3.89	

=== Age structure ===
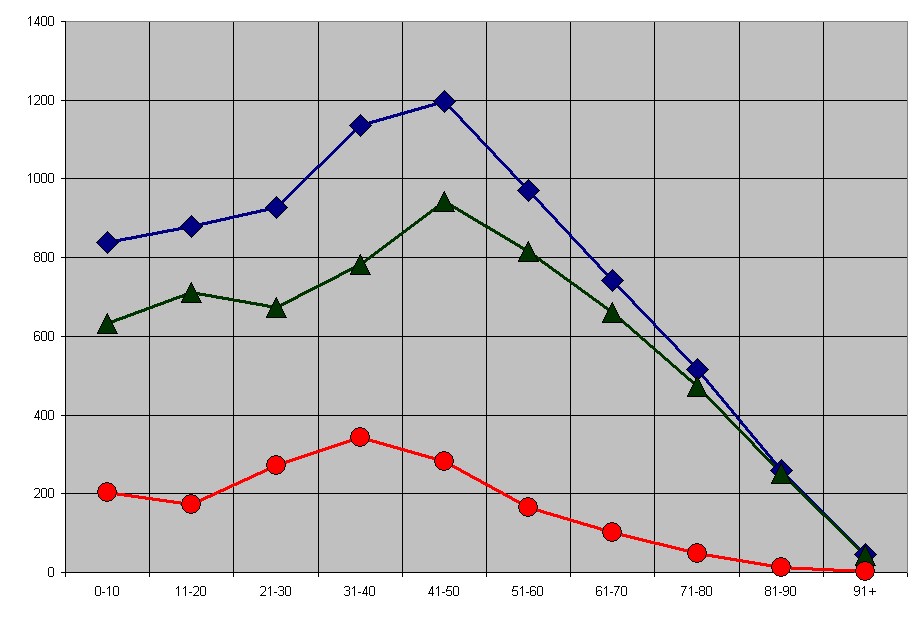
Demographic chart showing age distribution in Switzerland. Blue diamonds represent total population in thousands, green triangles represent Swiss Citizens only (in thousands) and red circles represent foreign population in thousands. Source for data Swiss Federal Statistical Office, 2007

Population distribution of Switzerland by age, gender and citizenship

Gender and nationality by age groups(2014) (thousands of individuals) Nos. in (brackets) are the numbers for each age group as a % of all age groups totalled.
Age	Total	Males	Females	Swiss	Foreign
0–10	902.7 (11.0%)	463.7	439.0	661.8	240.8 (26.7%)
11–20	854.4 (10.4%)	438.3	416.0	668.5	185.9 (21.8%)
21–30	1,071.5 (13.0%)	542.4	529.1	754.1	317.4 (29.6%)
31–40	1,149.1 (13.9%)	579.5	569.6	706.6	442.5 (38.5%)
41–50	1,282.3 (15.6%)	647.4	634.8	916.3	365.9 (28.5%)
51–60	1,146.2 (13.9%)	578.5	567.7	911.2	235.0 (20.5%)
61–70	876.4 (10.6%)	427.0	449.5	762.2	114.2 (13.0%)
71–80	593.8 (7.2%)	268.6	325.2	522.1	71.8 (12.1%)
81–90	308.0 (3.7%)	114.3	193.7	285.7	22.3 (7.2%)
91+	53.3 (0.6%)	14.1	39.2	50.7	2.6 (4.8%)

Data: Swiss Federal Statistics Office

As population growth slows, the percentage of elderly people increases. In July 2015, the Swiss Federal Office of Statistics published projections indicating that by 2045, the proportion of residents over the retirement age of 65 would climb to 48.1 per 100 residents between 20 and 64 years old, and possibly as high as 50.0 in the highest case scenario. In 2015 that ratio was only 29.1 per 100 residents.

Projected age structure No. of individuals in millions
Year	Scenario	0–20	Percent	21–64	Percent	65+	Percent
2015		1.67	20.0%	5.17	61.9%	1.5	18.0%
2030		1.88	19.7%	5.49	57.5%	2.17	22.8%
2045	(low)	1.66	17.7%	5.13	54.9%	2.56	27.4%
2045	(middle)	1.90	18.6%	5.59	54.9%	2.69	26.4%
2045	(high)	2.16	19.6%	6.06	55.0%	2.81	25.5%

Data: Swiss Federal Statistics Office

=== Sex ratio ===
Age	Males (thousands)	Females (thousands)	Ratio (male/female)
At birth	38.1	36.2	1.05
0–15	651.8	615.6	1.06
16–64	2,551.0	2,530.0	1.01
65+	524.3	720.9	0.73
total	3,727.0	3,866.5	0.96

Data: Swiss Federal Statistics Office 2007

=== Life expectancy ===
According to statistics released by the federal government in 2019, life expectancy at birth stands at 81.9 years for men and 85.6 years for women, with an overall average of 83.8 years for the population as a whole.

Sources: Our World in Data

==== 1876–1950 ====
Life expectancy at birth in Switzerland since 1876

Life expectancy at birth in Switzerland (e_{0})
Years						1876	1877	1878	1879	1880
e_{0}						40.1	40.0	40.5	41.8	42.8
Years	1881	1882	1883	1884	1885	1886	1887	1888	1889	1890
e_{0}	41.9	43.0	45.0	45.0	43.9	44.7	45.4	46.0	45.1	45.0
Years	1891	1892	1893	1894	1895	1896	1897	1898	1899	1900
e_{0}	44.7	47.2	46.1	45.8	46.9	48.9	49.1	48.2	49.3	47.5
Years	1901	1902	1903	1904	1905	1906	1907	1908	1909	1910
e_{0}	48.9	50.4	50.1	49.2	49.7	50.7	51.2	52.3	51.6	52.9
Years	1911	1912	1913	1914	1915	1916	1917	1918	1919	1920
e_{0}	51.7	54.4	54.2	55.1	55.9	56.5	55.8	46.3	54.9	54.3
Years	1921	1922	1923	1924	1925	1926	1927	1928	1929	1930
e_{0}	57.8	58.5	60.0	59.5	59.9	60.6	60.1	60.4	60.2	61.4
Years	1931	1932	1933	1934	1935	1936	1937	1938	1939	1940
e_{0}	61.2	61.2	62.4	62.9	62.1	63.2	63.5	63.8	64.0	63.5
Years	1941	1942	1943	1944	1945	1946	1947	1948	1949	1950
e_{0}	65.0	65.6	65.8	64.8	65.4	66.0	66.2	67.3	67.9	68.9

==== 1950–2015 ====
Life expectancy at birth in Switzerland
Period		Period	
1950–1955	69.3	1985–1990	77.2
1955–1960	70.7	1990–1995	77.9
1960–1965	71.6	1995–2000	79.2
1965–1970	72.6	2000–2005	80.5
1970–1975	73.7	2005–2010	81.8
1975–1980	75.2	2010–2015	82.7
1980–1985	76.1		

Source: UN World Population Prospects

== Vital statistics ==
Population Development in Switzerland since 1803

Data according to Federal Statistical Office, United Nations, Our World in Data and Gapminder Foundation.

Notable events in Swiss demographics:

- 1816-1818 – Famine caused by the Year Without a Summer
- 1854-1855 - Cholera pandemic
- 1870-1874 - Smallpox pandemic
- 1914-1918 – First World War
- 1918 - Spanish flu
- 2020-2022 - Covid-19

Year	Average population (31 December)	Live births	Deaths	Natural change	Crude birth rate (per 1000)	Crude death rate (per 1000)	Natural change (per 1000)	Crude migration change (per 1000)	Total fertility rates (Note: In fertility rates, 2.1 and above is a stable population and have been marked blue, 2 and below leads to an aging population and a reducing population.)
1803	1,850,000	62,520	40,420	22,100	33.79	21.85	11.95		
1804	1,860,000	62,180	45,780	16,400	33.43	24.61	8.82	−3.45	
1805	1,860,000	63,390	47,690	15,700	34.08	25.64	8.44	−8.44	
1806	1,870,000	61,920	46,620	15,300	33.11	24.93	8.18	−2.84	
1807	1,880,000	61,720	47,920	13,800	32.83	25.49	7.34	2.13	
1808	1,890,000	62,400	42,300	20,100	33.02	22.38	10.63	−5.36	
1809	1,900,000	64,400	40,400	24,000	33.89	21.26	12.63	−7.39	
1810	1,900,000	62,970	44,670	18,300	33.14	23.51	9.63	−9.63	
1811	1,910,000	64,800	52,000	12,800	33.93	27.23	6.70	−1.47	
1812	1,920,000	63,630	45,030	18,600	33.14	23.45	9.69	−4.49	
1813	1,930,000	59,850	45,350	14,500	31.01	23.50	7.51	−2.34	
1814	1,940,000	60,900	51,100	9,800	31.39	26.34	5.05	0.10	
1815	1,950,000	65,200	41,400	23,800	33.44	21.23	12.21	−7.09	
1816	1,960,000	62,700	44,400	18,300	31.99	22.65	9.34	−4.25	
1817	1,970,000	51,670	62,570	−10,900	26.23	31.76	−5.53	10.64	
1818	1,970,000	47,180	51,380	−4,200	23.95	26.08	−2.13	2.13	
1819	1,980,000	65,380	47,080	18,300	33.02	23.78	9.24	−4.20	
1820	1,990,000	65,740	41,140	24,600	33.04	20.67	12.36	−7.36	
1821	2,000,000	65,500	39,400	26,100	32.75	19.70	13.05	−8.07	
1822	2,010,000	65,100	39,600	25,500	32.39	19.70	12.69	−7.73	
1823	2,020,000	66,370	40,570	25,800	32.86	20.08	12.77	−7.84	
1824	2,030,000	66,110	41,510	24,600	32.57	20.45	12.12	−7.21	
1825	2,050,000	64,710	43,010	21,700	31.57	20.98	10.59	−0.83	
1826	2,060,000	67,630	43,930	23,700	32.83	21.33	11.50	−6.67	
1827	2,070,000	64,320	39,620	24,700	31.06	19.13	11.93	−7.12	
1828	2,080,000	65,910	44,010	21,900	31.69	21.16	10.53	−5.73	
1829	2,090,000	64,570	47,370	17,200	30.90	22.67	8.23	−3.45	
1830	2,100,000	66,100	44,600	21,500	31.48	21.24	10.24	−5.49	
1831	2,110,000	66,510	43,910	22,600	31.52	20.81	10.71	−5.99	
1832	2,120,000	63,820	47,320	16,500	30.10	22.32	7.78	−3.07	
1833	2,140,000	66,520	48,820	17,700	31.10	22.82	8.27	1.08	
1834	2,150,000	69,720	52,320	17,400	32.42	24.34	8.09	−3.45	
1835	2,160,000	70,740	47,940	22,800	32.76	22.20	10.56	−5.94	
1836	2,180,000	70,730	49,630	21,100	32.45	22.76	9.68	−0.51	
1837	2,190,000	71,120	55,320	15,800	32.48	25.26	7.21	−2.65	
1838	2,200,000	71,630	54,530	17,100	32.56	24.79	7.77	−3.23	
1839	2,220,000	71,200	52,300	18,900	32.07	23.56	8.51	0.50	
1840	2,230,000	72,080	52,380	19,700	32.33	23.48	8.83	−4.36	
1841	2,240,000	72,230	50,830	21,400	32.25	22.68	9.55	−5.10	
1842	2,260,000	71,550	52,550	19,000	31.65	23.26	8.41	0.44	
1843	2,270,000	71,880	52,180	19,700	31.66	22.99	8.68	−4.28	
1844	2,290,000	67,270	53,670	13,600	29.38	23.44	5.94	2.81	
1845	2,300,000	69,000	50,400	18,600	30.00	21.91	8.09	−3.75	
1846	2,310,000	67,400	52,400	15,000	29.18	22.68	6.49	−2.17	
1847	2,330,000	61,250	52,550	8,700	26.29	22.56	3.73	4.87	
1848	2,340,000	63,660	50,660	13,000	27.20	21.65	5.56	−1.29	
1849	2,360,000	68,380	50,480	17,900	28.97	21.38	7.58	0.89	4.14
1850	2,370,000	68,690	52,590	16,100	28.99	22.18	6.79	−2.58	4.14
1851	2,390,000	67,280	54,280	13,000	28.16	22.71	5.44	2.94	4.02
1852	2,400,000	66,000	53,800	12,200	27.50	22.42	5.08	−0.92	3.89
1853	2,410,000	65,650	55,550	10,100	27.24	23.05	4.19	−0.04	3.74
1854	2,430,000	64,230	55,630	8,600	26.42	22.89	3.54	4.71	3.65
1855	2,440,000	61,520	58,020	3,500	25.21	23.77	1.43	2.67	3.44
1856	2,460,000	67,330	51,930	15,400	27.37	21.11	6.26	1.88	3.82
1857	2,470,000	67,700	52,600	15,100	27.41	21.30	6.11	−2.07	3.85
1858	2,480,000	71,370	55,470	15,900	28.78	22.36	6.41	−2.38	4.05
1859	2,500,000	75,330	55,930	19,400	30.13	22.37	7.76	0.2	4.27
1860	2,515,396	75,310	50,910	24,400	29.93	20.24	9.70	−3.58	4.19
1861	2,533,077	74,820	57,520	17,300	29.53	22.71	6.83	0.2	4.14
1862	2,554,257	75,870	51,070	24,800	29.70	19.99	9.71	−1.4	4.18
1863	2,575,649	79,160	54,360	24,800	30.73	21.10	9.63	−1.3	4.32
1864	2,594,555	79,600	59,500	20,100	30.68	22.93	7.75	−0.5	4.32
1865	2,611,102	78,290	59,090	19,200	29.98	22.63	7.35	−1	4.26
1866	2,625,400	80,580	56,680	23,900	30.68	21.60	9.11	−3.7	4.33
1867	2,637,538	77,327	59,116	18,211	29.32	22.41	6.90	−2.3	4.16
1868	2,647,583	75,705	58,730	16,975	28.58	22.17	6.41	−2.6	4.04
1869	2,657,614	77,965	63,617	14,348	29.34	23.93	5.40	−1.6	4.14
1870	2,673,468	79,208	68,751	10,457	29.62	25.71	3.91	2	3.99
1871	2,686,618	77,633	74,002	3,631	28.90	27.55	1.35	3.5	3.99
1872	2,701,982	80,329	59,758	20,571	29.72	22.12	7.61	−1.9	3.99
1873	2,718,108	80,572	61,676	18,896	29.63	22.69	6.95	−1	3.98
1874	2,733,487	83,051	60,845	22,206	30.38	22.26	8.12	−2.5	4.07
1875	2,749,393	87,579	66,113	21,466	31.85	24.04	7.81	−2	4.26
1876	2,767,666	90,786	66,819	23,967	32.80	24.14	8.66	−2.1	4.40
1877	2,785,514	89,244	65,353	23,891	32.04	23.46	8.58	−2.2	4.29
1878	2,802,222	87,833	65,311	22,522	31.34	23.30	8.04	−2.1	4.19
1879	2,817,307	86,180	63,651	22,529	30.58	22.59	8.00	−2.6	4.09
1880	2,840,501	84,165	62,223	21,942	29.63	21.91	7.72	0.4	3.97
1881	2,851,255	85,142	63,979	21,163	29.85	22.43	7.42	−3.7	3.99
1882	2,860,234	82,689	62,849	19,840	28.91	21.97	6.93	2.4	3.87
1883	2,871,264	81,974	58,733	23,241	28.54	20.46	8.09	−4.3	3.82
1884	2,883,670	81,571	58,301	23,270	28.28	20.22	8.07	3.5	3.79
1885	2,892,184	80,349	61,548	18,801	27.79	21.28	6.50	−3.6	3.71
1886	2,901,605	80,763	60,061	20,702	27.83	20.70	7.13	−3.9	3.73
1887	2,911,233	81,287	58,939	22,348	27.93	20.25	7.68	−4.4	3.74
1888	2,922,897	81,098	58,229	22,869	27.74	19.93	7.82	−3.8	3.71
1889	2,949,577	81,176	59,715	21,461	27.53	20.25	7.28	1.8	3.70
1890	2,972,024	78,548	61,805	16,743	26.42	20.79	5.63	1.9	3.56
1891	3,000,632	83,596	61,183	22,413	27.86	20.39	2.1	7.35	3.78
1892	3,032,945	83,125	57,178	25,947	27.41	18.85	8.56	2.1	3.71
1893	3,063,218	84,897	61,059	23,838	27.71	19.93	7.78	2.1	3.70
1894	3,091,585	84,142	61,885	22,257	27.22	20.02	7.20	2	3.62
1895	3,122,589	84,973	59,747	25,226	27.21	19.13	8.08	1.9	3.60
1896	3,161,271	88,428	56,096	32,332	27.97	17.75	10.22	2	3.69
1897	3,201,298	90,078	56,399	33,679	28.13	17.62	10.51	2	3.70
1898	3,240,943	91,793	58,914	32,879	28.31	18.18	10.14	2.1	3.70
1899	3,282,407	94,472	57,591	36,881	28.78	17.55	11.23	1.4	3.75
1900	3,318,985	94,316	63,606	30,710	28.6	19.3	9.3	1.8	3.68
1901	3,364,073	97,028	60,018	37,010	29.0	18.0	11.1	2.5	3.72
1902	3,411,135	96,480	57,702	38,778	28.5	17.1	11.5	2.5	3.65
1903	3,453,716	93,824	59,626	34,198	27.4	17.4	10.0	2.5	3.50
1904	3,496,188	94,867	60,857	34,010	27.3	17.5	9.8	2.5	3.49
1905	3,536,835	94,653	61,800	32,853	26.9	17.6	9.3	2.3	3.44
1906	3,582,151	95,595	59,204	36,391	26.9	16.6	10.2	2.6	3.44
1907	3,625,456	94,508	59,252	35,256	26.2	16.4	9.8	2.3	3.36
1908	3,671,165	96,245	57,697	38,548	26.4	15.8	10.6	2.0	3.39
1909	3,711,868	94,112	59,416	34,696	25.5	16.1	9.4	1.7	3.28
1910	3,756,842	93,514	56,498	37,016	25.0	15.1	9.9	2.2	3.23
1911	3,778,312	91,320	59,619	31,701	24.2	15.8	8.4	−2.7	3.12
1912	3,805,595	92,196	54,102	38,094	24.1	14.2	10.0	−2.8	3.13
1913	3,828,413	89,757	55,427	34,330	23.2	14.3	8.9	−2.9	3.03
1914	3,849,766	87,330	53,629	33,701	22.4	13.8	8.6	−3.0	2.92
1915	3,860,635	75,545	51,524	24,021	19.5	13.3	6.2	−3.4	2.52
1916	3,871,760	73,660	50,623	23,037	19.0	13.0	5.9	−3.0	2.44
1917	3,878,896	72,065	53,306	18,759	18.5	13.7	4.8	−3.0	2.36
1918	3,864,844	72,658	75,034	−2,376	18.7	19.3	−0.6	−3.0	2.37
1919	3,869,481	72,125	54,932	17,193	18.6	14.2	4.4	−3.2	2.35
1920	3,883,360	81,190	55,992	25,198	20.9	14.4	6.5	−2.9	2.62
1921	3,908,521	80,808	49,518	31,290	20.8	12.8	8.1	−1.6	2.58
1922	3,928,566	76,290	50,292	25,998	19.7	13.0	6.7	−1.6	2.40
1923	3,952,134	75,551	45,983	29,568	19.5	11.8	7.6	−1.6	2.35
1924	3,970,682	73,508	48,988	24,520	18.9	12.6	6.3	−1.6	2.26
1925	3,989,227	72,570	47,877	24,693	18.6	12.2	6.3	−1.6	2.21
1926	4,009,537	72,118	46,452	25,666	18.3	11.8	6.5	−1.4	2.17
1927	4,024,345	69,533	49,202	20,331	17.6	12.4	5.1	−1.4	2.07
1928	4,040,177	69,594	48,063	21,531	17.4	12.1	5.4	−1.5	2.05
1929	4,052,557	69,006	50,438	18,568	17.2	12.5	4.6	−1.5	2.01
1930	4,070,042	69,855	46,939	22,916	17.2	11.6	5.7	−1.4	2.02
1931	4,091,602	68,249	49,414	18,835	16.7	12.1	4.6	0.7	1.95
1932	4,110,388	68,650	49,911	18,739	16.7	12.2	4.6	0	1.94
1933	4,136,343	67,509	47,181	20,328	16.4	11.4	4.9	1.4	1.89
1934	4,159,698	67,277	46,806	20,471	16.3	11.3	4.9	0.7	1.88
1935	4,178,640	66,378	50,233	16,145	16.0	12.1	3.9	0.7	1.84
1936	4,198,782	64,966	47,650	17,316	15.6	11.4	4.2	0.6	1.80
1937	4,217,126	62,480	47,274	15,206	14.9	11.3	3.6	0.8	1.74
1938	4,235,430	63,790	48,576	15,214	15.2	11.6	3.6	0.7	1.78
1939	4,252,902	63,837	49,484	14,353	15.2	11.8	3.4	0.7	1.79
1940	4,268,964	64,115	50,759	13,356	15.2	12.0	3.2	0.6	1.83
1941	4,296,693	71,926	47,336	24,590	16.9	11.1	5.8	0.7	2.06
1942	4,326,774	78,875	46,928	31,947	18.4	10.9	7.5	−0.5	2.28
1943	4,360,681	83,049	47,409	35,640	19.2	11.0	8.2	−0.4	2.42
1944	4,392,319	85,627	52,336	33,291	19.6	12.0	7.6	−0.3	2.51
1945	4,428,177	88,522	51,086	37,436	20.1	11.6	8.5	−0.3	2.61
1946	4,490,000	89,126	50,276	38,850	20.0	11.3	8.7	5.3	2.62
1947	4,549,100	87,724	51,384	36,340	19.4	11.4	8.0	5.2	2.56
1948	4,611,200	87,763	49,679	38,084	19.2	10.8	8.3	5.4	2.54
1949	4,668,000	85,308	49,497	35,811	18.4	10.7	7.7	4.6	2.45
1950	4,717,200	84,776	47,372	37,404	18.1	10.1	8.0	2.5	2.40
1951	4,778,900	81,903	49,952	31,951	17.2	10.5	6.7	6.4	2.30
1952	4,844,100	83,549	47,624	35,925	17.4	9.9	7.5	6.1	2.32
1953	4,907,000	83,029	49,684	33,345	17.0	10.2	6.8	6.2	2.29
1954	4,970,300	83,741	49,113	34,628	17.0	10.0	7.0	5.9	2.28
1955	5,033,700	85,331	50,366	34,965	17.1	10.1	7.0	5.8	2.30
1956	5,097,400	87,912	51,573	36,339	17.4	10.2	7.2	5.5	2.35
1957	5,162,800	90,823	51,066	39,757	17.7	10.0	7.8	5.0	2.41
1958	5,230,000	91,421	49,281	42,140	17.6	9.5	8.1	4.9	2.40
1959	5,295,500	92,973	50,077	42,896	17.7	9.5	8.2	4.3	2.42
1960	5,360,153	94,372	52,094	42,278	17.6	9.7	7.9	4.3	2.34
1961	5,508,435	99,238	51,004	48,234	18.3	9.4	8.9	18.8	2.48
1962	5,639,195	104,322	55,125	49,197	18.7	9.9	8.8	14.9	2.46
1963	5,749,299	109,993	56,989	53,004	19.3	10.0	9.3	10.2	2.68
1964	5,829,156	112,890	53,609	59,281	19.5	9.3	10.2	3.7	2.85
1965	5,883,788	111,835	55,547	56,288	19.1	9.5	9.6	−0.2	2.57
1966	5,952,216	109,738	55,804	53,934	18.5	9.4	9.1	2.5	2.47
1967	6,031,353	107,417	55,142	52,275	17.9	9.2	8.7	4.6	2.37
1968	6,104,074	105,130	57,342	47,788	17.3	9.4	7.9	4.2	2.28
1969	6,168,700	102,520	58,002	44,518	16.7	9.5	7.3	3.3	2.12
1970	6,193,064	99,216	57,091	42,125	16.1	9.2	6.8	−2.9	2.11
1971	6,233,744	96,261	57,856	38,405	15.5	9.3	6.2	0.4	2.06
1972	6,288,168	91,342	56,489	34,853	14.6	9.0	5.6	3.1	1.95
1973	6,326,525	87,518	56,990	30,528	13.9	9.0	4.8	1.3	1.85
1974	6,356,285	84,507	56,403	28,104	13.3	8.9	4.4	0.3	1.73
1975	6,320,978	78,464	55,924	22,540	12.4	8.8	3.6	-9.2	1.63
1976	6,284,029	74,199	57,095	17,104	11.8	9.1	2.7	−8.5	1.55
1977	6,285,156	72,829	55,658	17,171	11.6	8.9	2.7	−2.5	1.53
1978	6,285,156	71,375	57,718	13,657	11.4	9.2	2.2	−2.2	1.53
1979	6,303,573	71,986	57,454	14,532	11.4	9.1	2.3	0.6	1.52
1980	6,335,243	73,661	59,097	14,564	11.7	9.4	2.3	2.7	1.57
1981	6,372,904	73,747	59,763	13,984	11.6	9.4	2.2	3.7	1.59
1982	6,409,713	74,916	59,204	15,712	11.7	9.3	2.5	3.3	1.60
1983	6,427,833	73,659	60,756	12,903	11.5	9.5	2.0	0.8	1.52
1984	6,455,896	74,710	58,602	16,108	11.6	9.1	2.5	1.9	1.52
1985	6,484,834	74,684	59,583	15,101	11.5	9.2	2.3	2.2	1.51
1986	6,523,413	76,320	60,105	16,215	11.7	9.2	2.5	3.4	1.52
1987	6,566,799	76,505	59,511	16,994	11.7	9.1	2.6	4.1	1.56
1988	6,619,973	80,345	60,648	19,697	12.2	9.2	3.0	5.1	1.59
1989	6,673,850	81,180	60,882	20,298	12.2	9.2	3.1	5.0	1.62
1990	6,750,693	83,939	63,739	20,200	12.5	9.5	3.0	8.5	1.63
1991	6,842,768	86,200	62,634	23,566	12.7	9.2	3.5	10.1	1.68
1992	6,907,959	86,910	62,302	24,608	12.6	9.1	3.6	5.9	1.62
1993	6,968,570	83,762	62,512	21,250	12.1	9.0	3.1	5.7	1.53
1994	7,019,019	82,980	61,987	20,993	11.9	8.9	3.0	4.2	1.49
1995	7,062,354	82,203	63,387	18,816	11.7	9.0	2.7	3.5	1.46
1996	7,081,346	83,007	62,637	20,370	11.7	8.9	2.9	−0.2	1.53
1997	7,096,465	79,485	59,967	19,518	11.2	8.5	2.8	−0.7	1.45
1998	7,123,537	78,949	62,569	16,380	11.1	8.8	2.3	1.5	1.48
1999	7,164,444	78,408	62,503	15,905	11.0	8.7	2.2	3.5	1.47
2000	7,204,055	78,458	62,528	15,930	10.9	8.7	2.2	3.3	1.50
2001	7,255,653	73,509	61,287	12,222	10.2	8.5	1.7	5.5	1.41
2002	7,313,853	72,372	61,768	10,604	9.9	8.5	1.5	6.5	1.39
2003	7,364,148	71,848	63,070	8,778	9.8	8.6	1.2	5.7	1.39
2004	7,414,102	73,082	60,180	12,902	9.9	8.1	1.7	5.1	1.42
2005	7,459,128	72,903	61,124	11,779	9.8	8.2	1.6	4.5	1.43
2006	7,508,739	73,371	60,283	13,088	9.8	8.1	1.7	5.0	1.44
2007	7,559,494	74,494	61,089	13,405	9.9	8.1	1.8	5.0	1.46
2008	7,701,856	76,691	61,233	15,458	10.0	8.0	2.0	16.8	1.48
2009	7,785,806	78,286	62,476	15,810	10.1	8.1	2.0	8.9	1.50
2010	7,870,134	80,290	62,553	17,737	10.3	8.0	2.3	8.5	1.54
2011	7,954,662	80,808	62,091	18,717	10.2	7.8	2.3	8.4	1.52
2012	8,039,060	82,164	64,173	17,991	10.3	8.0	2.2	8.4	1.53
2013	8,139,631	82,731	64,961	17,770	10.3	8.0	2.3	10.2	1.52
2014	8,237,666	85,287	63,938	21,349	10.4	7.8	2.6	9.4	1.54
2015	8,327,126	86,559	67,606	18,953	10.4	8.1	2.3	8.6	1.54
2016	8,419,550	87,883	64,964	22,919	10.4	7.7	2.7	8.4	1.55
2017	8,484,130	87,381	66,971	20,410	10.3	7.9	2.4	5.3	1.52
2018	8,544,527	87,851	67,088	20,763	10.3	7.9	2.4	4.7	1.52
2019	8,606,033	86,172	67,780	18,392	10.0	7.9	2.1	5.1	1.48
2020	8,670,300	85,914	76,195	9,719	9.9	8.8	1.1	6.4	1.46
2021	8,738,791	89,402	71,074	18,328	10.3	8.2	2.1	5.8	1.51
2022	8,815,385	82,371	74,425	7,946	9.3	8.5	0.8	7.9	1.39
2023	8,960,800	80,024	71,822	8,202	9.0	8.1	0.9	15.6	1.33
2024	9,051,029	78,256	71,942	6,314	8.7	8.0	0.7	9.3	1.29
2025	9,124,288	78,153	71,904	6,249	8.6	7.9	0.7	7.3	1.28

=== Current vital statistics ===
Period	Live births	Deaths	Natural increase
January–August 2025	52,398	47,429	+4,969
January–August 2026	51,019	48,242	+2,777
Difference	▼ −1,379 (−2.63%)	▲ +813 (+1.71%)	▼ −2,192

=== Total fertility rates by nationality and region ===
2024
Regions	TFR
Central Switzerland	1.37
Eastern Switzerland	1.37
Northwestern Switzerland	1.32
Espace Mittelland	1.30
Lake Geneva region	1.25

2025
Cantons and cities	TFR
Appenzell Ausserrhoden	1.62
Appenzell Innerrhoden	1.54
Nidwalden	1.42
Uri	1.42
Thurgau	1.39
Zug	1.38
Schwyz	1.37
Solothurn	1.37
Fribourg	1.36
St. Gallen	1.36
Aargau	1.35
Basel-Landschaft	1.30
Jura	1.30
Schaffhausen	1.30
Obwalden	1.29
Luzern	1.28
Vaud	1.28
Bern	1.27
Genève	1.26
Glarus	1.26
Zürich	1.23
Neuchâtel	1.22
Valais	1.22
Grisons	1.15
Ticino	1.14

2025
Nationality	TFR
Swiss total	1.28
Swiss women	1.18
Foreign women	1.50

=== Structure of the population ===
Population Estimates by Sex and Age Group (31.XII.2020) (Data refer to legal resident population.):

Age group	Male	Female	Total	%
Total	4 302 599	4 367 701	8 670 300	100
0–4	224 268	212 850	437 118	5.04
5–9	226 409	213 276	439 685	5.07
10–14	220 562	208 906	429 468	4.95
15–19	216 228	203 802	420 030	4.84
20–24	247 027	231 154	478 181	5.52
25–29	284 900	275 053	559 953	6.46
30–34	313 683	306 776	620 459	7.16
35–39	314 591	308 180	622 771	7.18
40–44	301 811	297 807	599 618	6.92
45–49	302 514	299 345	601 859	6.94
50–54	328 949	325 660	654 609	7.55
55–59	325 419	319 081	644 500	7.43
60–64	265 775	266 604	532 379	6.14
65–69	210 196	224 718	434 914	5.02
70–74	190 316	211 899	402 215	4.64
75–79	153 639	180 613	334 252	3.86
80–84	96 134	130 952	227 086	2.62
85–89	55 660	91 514	147 174	1.70
90–94	20 336	45 440	65 776	0.76
95–99	3 874	12 653	16 527	0.19
100+	308	1 418	1 726	0.02
Age group	Male	Female	Total	Percent
0–14	671 239	635 032	1 306 271	15.07
15–64	2 900 897	2 833 462	5 734 359	66.14
65+	730 463	899 207	1 629 670	18.80

== Nationality ==
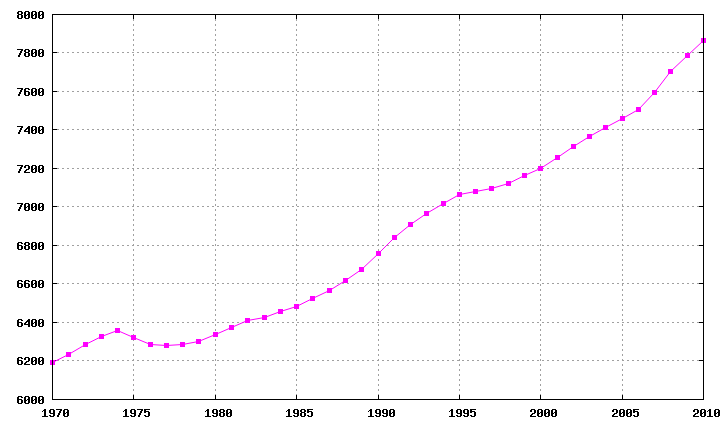
The population of Switzerland 1970–2005. Data from Swiss Federal Statistical Office 2005; number of inhabitants in thousands.

Population pyramid of Switzerland in 2021 by citizenship

Unlike many other OECD countries, the Swiss Federal Statistical Office does not collect any data on racial identity or ethnic identity. Data is collected on country of birth, but as the OECD write "In general, collecting migration-related information on the foreign-born population and their children is a crude method for capturing diversity."

Encompassing the Central Alps, Switzerland sits at the crossroads of several major European cultures. Its population includes a two-thirds majority of Alemannic German speakers and a one-quarter Latin minority (French, Italian and Romansh), see linguistic geography of Switzerland. 10% of the population natively speak an immigrant language.

Switzerland consistently ranks high on quality of life indices, including per capita income, concentration of computer and internet usage per capita, insurance coverage per individual, and health care rates.

=== Permanent residents by nationality ===
The number of registered resident foreigners was 1,001,887 (16.17%) in 1970. This amount decreased to 904,337 (14.34%) in 1979, and has increased steadily since that time, passing the 20% mark during 2001 and rising to 1,524,663 (20.56%) in 2004. The number of Swiss citizens thus numbered about 5.9 million in that year.

In 2013 there were a total of 1,937,447 permanent residents (23.8% of the total population of 8.14 million) in Switzerland. Of these, 1.65 million resident foreigners (85.0%, or 20.2% of the 8.14 million total population), had European citizenship (Italian: 298,875; German: 292,291; Portuguese: 253,227; French: 110,103; Serbian: 90,704; Kosovan: 86,976; Spanish: 75,333, Macedonian: 62,633; British: 40,898; Austrian: 39,494; Bosnian and Herzegovinian: 33,002; Croatian: 30,471). From other continents; 122,941 residents were from Asia; 83,873 from Africa; 78,433 from the Americas; and 4,145 from Oceania. 3.6% of the total population in Switzerland is non-European.

The following chart shows permanent resident numbers from selected regions and countries every 5 years.

Nation	1980	1985	1990	1995	2000	2005	2010	2015	2020
Total	913,497	960,674	1,127,109	1,363,590	1,424,370	1,541,912	1,766,277	2,048,667	2,210,788
Europe	859,054	892,748	1,036,760	1,238,937	1,261,975	1,334,590	1,504,943	1,733,255	1,831,923
Africa	10,539	13,130	20,291	28,800	37,618	48,081	71,527	93,814	113,647
Americas	20,838	23,438	29,149	38,585	49,687	61,732	74,511	78,773	83,591
North America	12,182	12,394	13,775	16,140	18,952	21,004	25,590	26,271	26,249
Latin America and Caribbean	8,656	11,044	15,374	22,445	30,735	40,728	48,921	52,502	57,342
Asia	21,569	29,772	38,921	54,914	72,002	94,009	110,549	136,789	174,976
Oceania	1,260	1,326	1,728	1,999	2,829	3,242	3,990	4,230	4,187
Germany	87,389	82,143	84,485	91,976	109,785	158,651	263,271	300,691	309,459
Spain	98,098	109,232	116,987	102,320	84,266	72,167	64,126	82,334	86,220
France	48,002	48,948	51,729	55,407	61,688	70,901	95,643	122,970	145,461
Italy	423,008	394,812	381,493	361,892	321,795	297,917	287,130	311,742	325,348
Austria	31,986	29,417	29,123	28,454	29,191	33,069	37,013	41,145	44,252
Portugal	10,863	31,029	86,035	135,646	135,449	167,857	212,586	267,474	257,691
United Kingdom	16,050	17,482	18,269	20,030	22,309	26,425	37,273	41,766	42,749
Croatia	–	–	–	42,582	43,876	40,709	33,507	29,355	27,928
Serbia and Montenegro	–	–	–	–	190,940	196,833	–	–	–
Serbia	–	–	–	–	–	–	121,908	71,260	61,933
Montenegro	–	–	–	–	–	–	2,022	2,536	2,523
Kosovo	–	–	–	–	–	–	58,755	106,879	113,660
Bosnia and Herzegovina	–	–	–	24,748	45,111	43,354	35,513	31,905	28,756
North Macedonia	–	–	–	39,540	56,092	60,898	60,116	64,448	67,745
Albania	15	17	29	576	1,093	1,218	1,308	1,590	2,644
Sri Lanka	373	808	2,840	9,841	20,215	31,865	28,963	27,667	28,728
Iraq	352	378	454	771	2,046	3,257	7,553	7,092	8,769
Turkey	38,353	51,206	64,899	79,372	80,165	75,903	71,835	69,215	68,049

=== Naturalization ===
In 2004, 35,700 people acquired Swiss citizenship according to Swiss nationality law, a figure slightly larger than that of the previous year (35,424), and four times larger than the 1990 figure (8,658). About a third of those naturalized are from a successor state of former Yugoslavia: 7,900 Serbia-Montenegro, 2,400 Bosnia-Herzegovina, 2,000 North Macedonia, 1,600 Croatia. 4,200 were from Italy, 3,600 from Turkey, 1,600 from Sri Lanka, 1,200 from Portugal, and 1,200 from France.

The yearly rate of naturalization has quintupled over the 1990s and 2000s, from roughly 9,000 to 45,000. Relative to the population of resident foreigners, this amounts to an increase from 8% in 1990 to 27% in 2007, or relative to the number of Swiss citizens from 1.6% in 1990 to 7.3% in 2007.

The following table shows the historical development of naturalization from selected countries.

Origin	1981	1985	1990	1995	2000	2001	2002	2003	2004	2005	2006	2007	2008	2009	2010	2011	2012	2013
Total	14,299	14,393	8,658	16,790	28,700	27,583	36,515	35,424	35,685	38,437	46,711	43,889	44,365	43,440	39,314	36,012	33,500	34,061
Europe	12,978	12,349	6,970	12,592	21,975	20,969	28,102	27,558	27,728	30,109	36,087	33,771	34,879	33,795	30,458	27,769	25,778	26,457
Africa	283	341	273	919	1,824	1,900	2,163	1,954	1,848	2,064	2,619	2,883	2,599	2,627	2,499	2,337	2,417	2,363
North America	171	277	139	230	321	316	376	367	333	336	407	451	371	427	428	410	443	499
South America and Caribbean	245	442	461	777	1,554	1,528	1,790	1,749	1,626	1,478	1,859	1,921	1,675	1,802	1,587	1,613	1,407	1,609
Asia	590	928	796	2,226	2,981	2,830	4,033	3,717	4,065	4,382	5,666	4,787	4,771	4,710	4,261	3,788	3,349	3,038
Oceania	30	52	12	24	29	27	35	67	73	59	62	61	56	55	58	62	64	66
Italy	4,665	3,259	1,995	4,376	6,652	5,386	6,633	5,085	4,196	4,032	4,502	4,629	4,921	4,804	4,111	4,033	3,998	4,379
Germany	2,650	2,839	1,144	703	646	585	817	670	639	773	1,144	1,361	3,022	4,035	3,617	3,516	3,357	3,804
Kosovo															1,611	2,518	2,556	2,640
Serbia															6,859	4,261	3,362	2,529
Portugal	86	127	170	175	765	779	920	1,165	1,199	1,505	2,383	2,201	1,761	2,336	2,217	2,211	2,071	2,184
Turkey	150	189	211	1,205	3,127	3,116	4,128	4,216	3,565	3,467	3,457	3,044	2,866	2,593	2,091	1,852	1,638	1,622
France	1,262	1,228	684	871	1,360	1,306	1,367	1,215	1,181	1,021	1,260	1,218	1,110	1,314	1,084	1,272	1,197	1,558
North Macedonia				76	857	1,022	1,639	1,802	1,981	2,171	2,596	2,210	2,287	1,831	1,586	1,322	1,212	1,270
Bosnia and Herzegovina				112	999	1,128	1,865	2,268	2,371	2,790	3,149	3,016	2,855	2,408	1,924	1,610	1,145	1,156
Croatia				577	970	1,045	1,638	1,565	1,616	1,681	1,837	1,660	2,046	1,599	1,483	1,268	1,195	1,118
Spain	567	643	401	431	851	699	691	800	823	975	1,283	1,246	1,096	1,245	1,120	1,044	1,033	1,047
Sri Lanka	7	104	30	42	375	446	1,124	1,139	1,565	1,996	2,941	2,206	2,348	2,158	1,783	1,467	1,170	890
Iraq	2	8	3	15	40	42	33	54	67	80	139	142	163	190	240	266	399	355

== Immigration ==
Swiss and foreign born population pyramid of Switzerland in 2021

Foreign population by country of citizenship as of 30 September 2024:

Rank	Nationality	Population
1	(European Union) Germany	329,486
2	(European Union) Italy	270,333
3	(European Union) Portugal	262,338
4	(European Union) Spain	193,255
5	Kosovo	177,025
6	(European Union) France	99,437
7	Turkey	82,427
8	North Macedonia	70,416
9	Serbia	55,440
10	(European Union) Poland	48,437
11	(European Union) Austria	47,961
12	United Kingdom	37,750
13	(European Union) Romania	37,265
14	Eritrea	36,515
15	(European Union) Croatia	32,568
16	(European Union) Hungary	30,857
17	Sri Lanka	27,253
18	Bosnia and Herzegovina	26,842
19	Brazil	24,526
20	(European Union) Netherlands	22,590
21	(European Union) Slovakia	22,019
22	Syria	21,811
23	Afghanistan	21,643
24	(European Union) Greece	21,221
25	China	20,547
26	(European Union) Bulgaria	18,433
27	United States	18,354
28	India	18,013
29	(European Union) Belgium	15,937
30	Russia	15,647

=== Migration data of Switzerland ===
Net Migration to Switzerland (Excluding Swiss Nationals)
Year	Immigration	Emigration	Net Migration
1980	75,262	63,697	11,565
1981	92,937	69,947	22,990
1982	86,725	66,484	20,241
1983	69,145	65,699	3,446
1984	69,998	59,674	10,324
1985	72,356	58,851	13,505
1986	79,686	57,595	22,091
1987	83,927	57,789	26,138
1988	95,973	61,447	34,526
1989	99,352	66,314	33,038
1990	122,779	65,713	57,066
1991	133,100	73,443	59,657
1992	131,891	86,362	45,529
1993	122,456	77,537	44,919
1994	107,650	69,666	37,984
1995	90,957	69,357	21,600
1996	74,359	71,949	2,410
1997	69,604	67,880	1,724
1998	72,202	64,017	8,185
1999	83,677	62,780	20,897
2000	84,200	59,302	24,898
2001	99,746	56,477	43,269
2002	105,014	53,517	51,497
2003	98,812	51,046	47,766
2004	100,834	52,950	47,884
2005	99,091	54,435	44,656
2006	107,177	57,739	49,438
2007	143,855	60,688	83,167
2008	161,629	58,266	103,363
2009	138,269	59,236	79,033
2010	139,495	70,528	68,967
2011	140,508	66,738	73,770
2012	151,002	73,855	77,147
2013	167,248	77,707	89,541
2014	161,149	82,607	78,542
2015	162,563	86,528	76,035
2016	167,407	90,088	77,319
2017	147,142	93,157	53,985
2018	146,183	98,431	47,752
2019	145,608	94,859	50,749
2020	137,685	83,602	54,083
2021	143,506	88,053	55,453
2022	169,055	90,861	78,194
2023	241,040	93,289	147,751
2024	190,043	99,680	90,363
2025	181,500	97,900	83,600

Net Migration to Switzerland (Including Swiss Nationals)
Year	Total Immigration	Total Emigration	Total Net Migration	Swiss Immigration	Swiss Emigration	Swiss Net Migration	Foreigners Immigration	Foreigners Emigration	Foreigners Net Migration
2021	165,600	116,800	48,800	22,100	28,700	−6,600	143,500	88,100	55,500
2022	190,900	122,100	68,800	21,800	31,300	−9,400	169,100	90,900	78,200
2023	263,100	124,000	139,100	22,000	30,700	−8,600	241,700	90,300	147,800
2024	212,700	125,600	87,100	22,600	30,100	−7,500	190,100	95,500	94,600
2025	204,600	127,300	77,300	23,100	29,400	-6,300	181,500	97,900	83,600

=== Emigration ===
In 2004, 623,100 Swiss citizens (8.9%) lived abroad, the largest group in France (166,200), followed by the United States (71,400) and Germany (70,500).

== Employment and income ==
Unemployment, youth ages 15–24
total: 8.1%. Country comparison to the world: 138th
male: 8.1%
female: 8% (2017 est.)

Average hourly income

23.14 CHF

== Religion ==
Religion in Switzerland (population age 15+, 2023)
1. Unaffiliated (36.5%)
2. Roman Catholic (30.7%)
3. Protestant Church of Switzerland (19.5%)
4. Other Christian churches (5.80%)
5. Islam (6.00%)
6. Judaism (0.20%)
7. Other religions (1.30%)

Switzerland as a federal state has no state religion, though most of the cantons (except for Geneva and Neuchâtel) recognize official churches (Landeskirchen), in all cases including the Roman Catholic Church and the Protestant Church of Switzerland. These churches, and in some cantons also the Old Catholic Church and Jewish congregations, are financed by official taxation of adherents.

A 2005 Eurobarometer poll found 48% of Swiss citizens to be theist, 39% expressing belief in "some sort of spirit or life force", 9% atheist and 4% said that they don't know ("DK").

Adherence to Christian churches has declined considerably since the late 20th century, from close to 94% in 1980 to about 67% in 2016. In 2000, 5.78 million residents (79.2%, compared to 93.7% in 1980) were Christian (Roman Catholic 42.3%, Protestant 33.9%, other Christian communities 4.3%). 809,800 (11.4%, compared to 3.8% in 1980) were without any religious affiliation. An additional 3.6% were "religious affiliation unknown" (1.2% in 1980). 310,800 (3.6%) were Muslim (compared to 0.7% in 1980), 17,900 (0.2%) were Jewish (0.3% in 1980). Other "churches and religious communities" were at 0.7% (0.2% in 1980). Between 2010 and 2022, the proportion of Roman Catholics and Reformed Protestants fell slightly (by 7 percentage points each), in contrast to that of Muslims and other Islamic communities (+1 point). The proportion of Jewish communities has hardly changed whereas that of persons without religious affiliation has risen by 13 percentage points. In 2016, of 15 to 24 year olds 65.4% were Christian (36.3% Roman Catholic, 22.6% Reformed, 6.6% other), 23.0% unaffiliated, 0.3% Jewish, 8.3% Muslim, 1.7% other religions. Those aged 25 to 44 were 58.4% Christian (33.1% Roman Catholic, 18.7% Reformed, 6.7% other), 31.0% unaffiliated, 0.2% Jewish, 7.5% Muslim, 1.7% other religions. Older adults (45 to 64 years old) were 67.0% Christian (37.7% Roman Catholic, 23.9% Reformed, 5.5% other), 25.9% unaffiliated, 0.2% Jewish, 4.2% Muslim, 1.5% other religions. Senior citizens (over 65) were 81.3% Christian (40.3% Roman Catholic, 36.2% Reformed, 4.8% other), 14.9% unaffiliated, 0.3% Jewish, 1.1% Muslim, 0.5% other religions. Furthermore, notable is the significant difference in church adherence between Swiss citizens (72%) and foreign nationals (51%) in 2016. The Federal Statistical Office reported the religious demographics as of 2023 as follows (based on the resident population age 15 years and older): 56% Christian (including 30.7% Roman Catholic, 19.5% Reformed, 5.8% other), 35.6% unaffiliated, 6% Muslim, 0.2% Jewish, 1.3% other religions. (100%: 6,981,381, registered resident population age 15 years and older).

== Languages ==
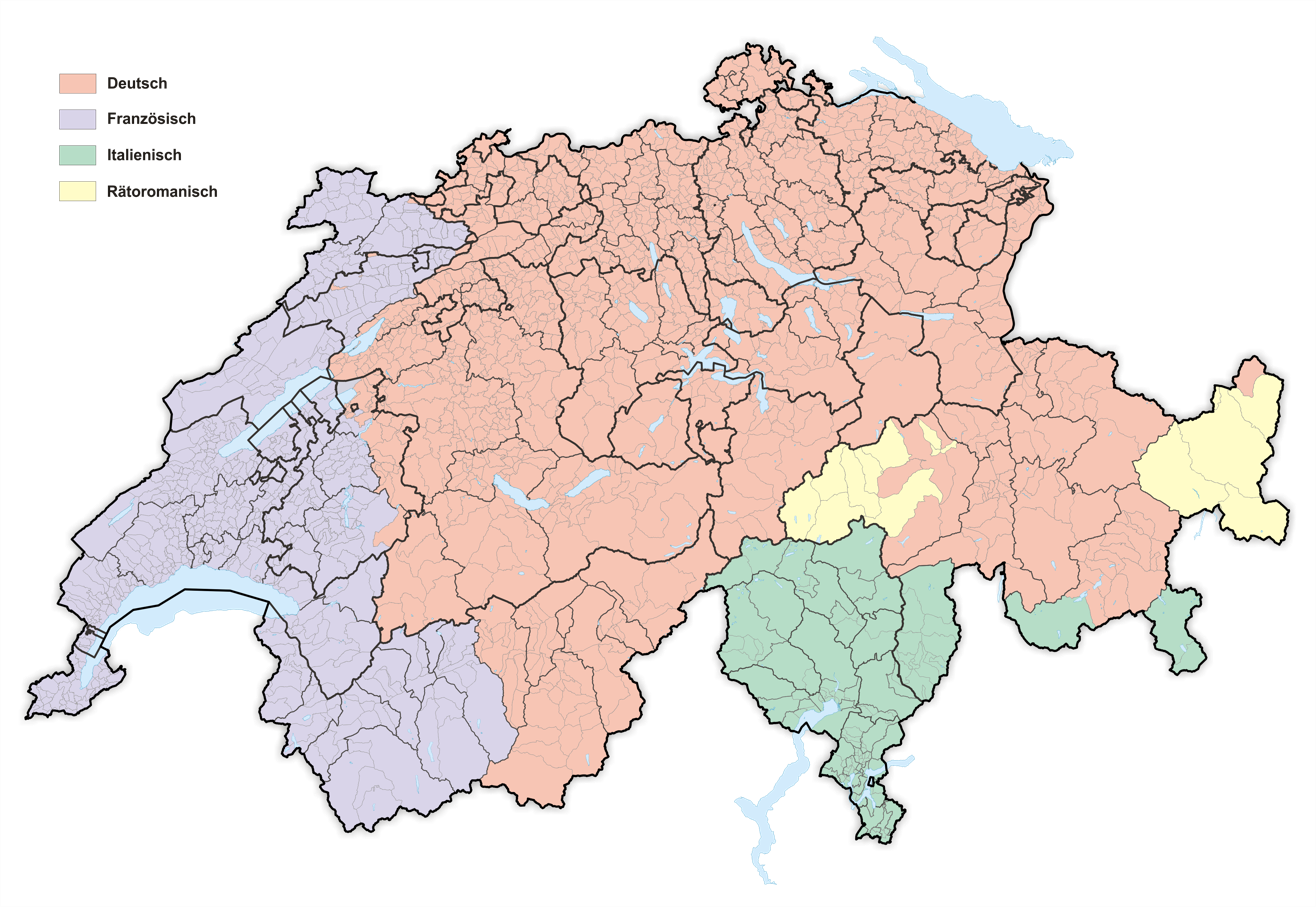
Main languages in Switzerland (2026): German French Italian Romansh

The four national languages of Switzerland are German, French, Italian and Romansh. In 2017, permanent residents who spoke German (mostly Swiss German dialects) as their main language or co-main language numbered about 63% (5.2 million), followed by 22.9% (1.9 million) for French (mostly Swiss French, but including some Franco-Provençal dialects), 8.2% (678,000) for Italian (mostly Swiss Italian, but including Insubric dialects) and less than 0.5% (44,000) for Romansh.

The non-official language with the largest group of main or co-main language speakers (in 2017) is English with 448,000 speakers, followed by Portuguese with 303,000, Albanian with 262,000, followed by Serbo-Croatian with 205,000 speakers and Spanish with 197,000. All other languages totaled 640,000.

== Education ==
Almost all Swiss are literate. Switzerland's 13 institutes of higher learning enrolled 99,600 students in the academic year of 2001–02. About 25% of the adult population hold a diploma of higher learning. According to the CIA World Factbook data for 2003, 99% of the Swiss population aged 15 and over could read and write, with the rate being identical for both sexes.

During the 2008/09 school year there were 1,502,257 students in the entire Swiss educational system. In kindergarten or pre-school, there were 152,919 students (48.6% female). These students were taught by 13,592 teachers (96.0% female) in 4,949 schools, of which 301 were private schools. There were 777,394 students (48.6% female) in the obligatory schools, which include primary and lower secondary schools. These students were taught by 74,501 teachers (66.3% female) in 6,083 schools, of which 614 were private. The upper secondary school system had 337,145 students (46.9% female). They were taught by 13,900 teachers (42.3% female) in 730 schools, of which 240 were private. The tertiary education system had 234,799 students (49.7% female). They were taught by 37,546 teachers (32.8% female) in 367 schools.

== Regional disparities ==
Canton	Tax index for all Federal, Cantonal and Church Taxes (Switzerland = 100.0) 2006	Tax rate (% of total income) for a married couple with two children 2006		Population under 20 as a percentage of total population aged 20–64 2007	National Income per person in CHF 2005	Change in National Income per person 2003–2005
Canton	Tax index for all Federal, Cantonal and Church Taxes (Switzerland = 100.0) 2006	Income 50,000 CHF	Income 150,000 CHF	Population under 20 as a percentage of total population aged 20–64 2007	National Income per person in CHF 2005	Change in National Income per person 2003–2005
Switzerland	100	2.36	11.56	34.59	54,031	5.3
Zürich	82.9	2.16	8.65	31.12	68,803	4.6
Bern	123.1	2.14	13.91	33.05	45,643	5
Luzern	119	3.47	12.56	37.19	43,910	5.3
Uri	144.2	4.54	12.42	37.06	45,711	5.3
Schwyz	66.5	2.26	6.98	36.95	50,170	6.3
Obwalden	146.5	4.14	11.53	40.88	39,645	4.7
Nidwalden	79.1	2.31	9.41	34.55	73,285	15.6
Glarus	134.8	4.62	12.56	36.85	73,236	10.9
Zug	50.3	0.47	5.5	35.45	93,752	5.4
Fribourg	126.4	2.33	12.74	40.2	39,559	2.6
Solothurn	116.9	2.36	12.95	34.34	46,844	4.9
Basel-Stadt	113.1	1.01	14.3	26.6	115,178	15.9
Basel-Landschaft	92.5	2.12	12.4	33	53,501	3.9
Schaffhausen	114.6	2.94	11.62	32.92	55,125	5.4
Appenzell Ausserrhoden	121.7	3.8	12.06	37.6	44,215	4.7
Appenzell Innerrhoden	105.6	3.18	9.88	44.46	45,936	7.4
St. Gallen	115.5	2.53	12.68	37.66	44,866	4
Graubünden	112.2	2.99	11.51	33.97	49,355	11.7
Aargau	87.4	1.52	10.4	34.9	49,209	2.5
Thurgau	86.6	0.34	11.48	37.52	44,918	3.2
Ticino	64.6	0.24	9.04	31.14	41,335	3.4
Vaud	106.2	0.42	12.2	37.87	52,901	3.4
Valais	121.3	2.72	10.68	35.18	38,385	6
Neuchâtel	137.1	3.8	15.96	38.06	49,775	6.6
Genève	89.8	0.05	11.81	35.4	62,839	5.1
Jura	126.6	2.87	15.26	40.09	38,069	6.4

== Crime ==
The police registered a total of 553,421 criminal offences in 2009, including 51 killings and 185 attempted murders. There were 616 cases of rape. In the same year, 94,574 adults (85% of them male, 47.4% of them Swiss citizens) were convicted under criminal law. 57.3% of convictions were for traffic offences.

In the same year, 15,064 minors (78.3% of them male, 68.2% of them of Swiss nationality, 76.3% aged between 15 and 18) were convicted.

The number of convicted persons is given in the following tables. Each class of crime references the relevant section of the Strafgesetzbuch (Criminal Code, abbreviated as StGB in German), or Betäubungsmittelgesetz (abbr. BetmG, Narcotics Act), or the Strassenverkehrsgesetz (abbr. SVG, Swiss Traffic Regulations).

Year	Total Convicted Adults	Homicide (Art. 111,112,113,116 StGB)	Serious Bodily Injury (Art. 122 StGB)	Minor Bodily Injury (Art. 123 StGB)	Sexual Contact with Children (Art. 187 StGB)	Rape (Art. 190 StGB)	Theft (Art. 139 StGB)	Robbery (Art. 140 StGB)	Receiving Stolen Goods (Art. 160 StGB)	Embezzlement (Art. 138 StGB)	Fraud (Art. 146 StGB)	Narcotics Possession	Major Violation of Traffic Laws (Art. 90 Abs. 1&2 SVG)	Impaired Driving (Art. 91 SVG)
2005	26,199	105	95	2,439	416	110	5,967	497	1,249	906	1,469	5,510	22,015	16,466
2006	26,583	116	105	2,537	388	135	5,933	565	1,186	876	1,516	5,403	21,535	21,058
2007	24,265	105	94	2,262	386	139	5,502	524	930	805	1,597	5,090	21,294	20,108
2008	26,327	107	134	2,632	412	135	5,756	525	909	854	1,660	5,387	25,265	20,600
2009	27,727	103	129	2,655	388	129	6,449	533	941	859	1,566	5,533	25,557	19,711
2010	28,691	94	149	2,677	334	128	6,659	593	905	784	1,750	6,125	25,983	20,591
2011	29,128	82	127	2,721	274	86	6,950	442	1,007	716	1,767	4,710	23,590	18,882
2012	33,925	116	179	2,845	293	108	8,936	511	1,332	745	1,971	5,734	22,906	18,396
2013	35,325	114	178	2,843	317	98	9,491	654	1,433	670	2,307	6,070	22,277	17,465
2014^{a}	32,911	99	197	2,617	288	77	8,335	520	1,112	646	2,153	6,164	24,263	17,041

^a 2014 conviction numbers may not include convictions overturned on appeal.
Due to privacy protection laws some convictions are not included.

Year	Total Convicted Minors	Homicide (Art. 111,112,113,116 StGB)	Serious Bodily Injury (Art. 122 StGB)	Minor Bodily Injury (Art. 123 StGB)	Sexual Contact with Children (Art. 187 StGB)	Rape (Art. 190 StGB)	Theft (Art. 139 StGB)	Robbery (Art. 140 StGB)	Receiving Stolen Goods (Art. 160 StGB)	Embezzlement (Art. 138 StGB)	Fraud (Art. 146 StGB)	Narcotics Possession	Major Violation of Traffic Laws (Art. 90 Abs. 1&2 SVG)	Impaired Driving (Art. 91 SVG)
2005	7,580	7	10	634	73	14	3,528	375	400	34	65	918	124	180
2006	7,769	7	22	644	118	19	3,418	330	390	35	51	1,019	126	189
2007	6,910	6	21	699	101	19	2,189	285	285	21	47	680	116	141
2008	6,975	4	24	688	80	17	1,998	334	272	17	57	560	101	125
2009	6,931	6	24	665	73	5	2,033	365	311	19	57	600	142	105
2010	7,613	13	36	770	71	17	2,410	413	242	19	51	565	119	141
2011	5,427	2	31	553	65	5	1,585	256	153	10	49	507	138	152
2012	5,070	2	34	476	71	8	1,620	303	164	25	56	554	74	124
2013	5,199	3	32	407	75	21	1,666	325	166	27	90	690	72	95
2014	4,849^{a}	1	33	380	63	8	1,375	231	159	24	70	817	86	124

^a 2014 conviction numbers may not include convictions overturned on appeal.
Due to privacy protection laws some convictions are not included.

== See also ==
- List of Swiss people
- Switzerland
- Immigration to Europe
- List of countries by immigrant population
- Politics of Switzerland
- Poverty in Switzerland
- Metropolitan areas in Switzerland
- Albanians in Switzerland
- Italian immigration to Switzerland
- No to ten million Switzerland initiative (2026 referendum)
