= Emigration from the former Yugoslavia to Switzerland =

Immigrant communities from former Yugoslavia in Switzerland

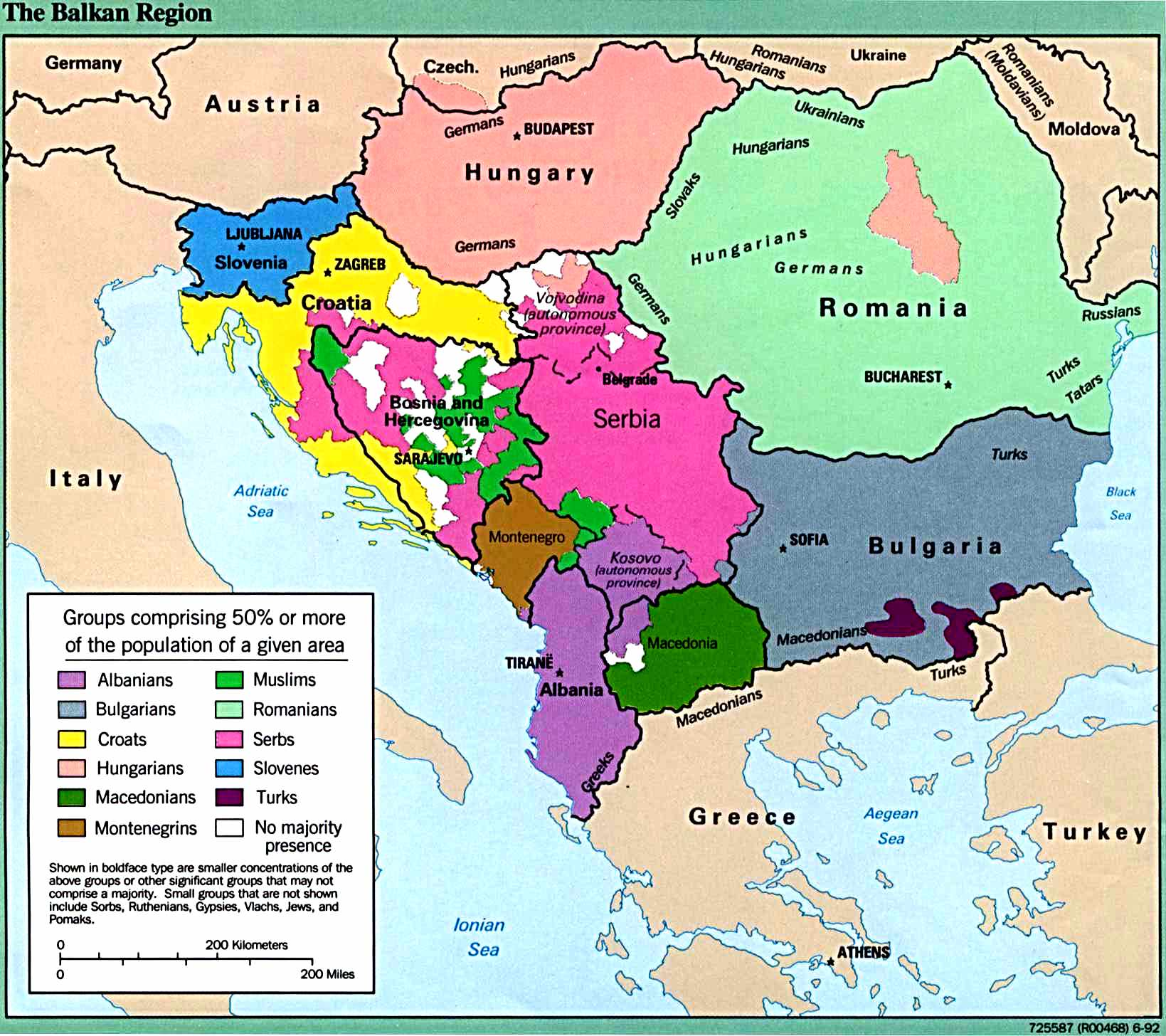
Ethnic map of the Balkans showing diversity (1992).

A significant wave of immigration from the former Yugoslavia to Switzerland occurred during the 1990s and 2000s. While moderate numbers of Yugoslav citizens had residence in Switzerland during the 1980s, the bulk of immigration took place as a consequence of the Yugoslav Wars and by family reunion of those who had immigrated during this period.

About half a million immigrants from the former Yugoslavia lived in Switzerland as of 2009, corresponding to roughly 6.5% of total Swiss population. About half of this number are Albanians, while the other half is of South Slavic origin.

Taken as a single group, people from former Yugoslavia are the largest immigrant group in Switzerland, followed by the Italians at about 294,000. From the ethnic perspective, Albanians form the second largest immigrant group.

== Demographics ==
Since the Swiss Federal Statistical Office keeps a record of the nationalities of foreign residents, their ethnicity is not recorded.

In 1920, 1,235 citizens of the Kingdom of Serbs, Croats and Slovenes had residence in Switzerland. This number dropped to below 700 during World War II. After the end of the war and the formation of Democratic Federal Yugoslavia, the number grew slowly, to 1,169 in 1960. During the 1960s to 1970s, immigration began to pick up noticeably with the influx of migrant workers, with 24,971 Yugoslav citizens registered in 1970 and 60,916 in 1980. With the collapse of Yugoslavia, immigration increased steeply, with 172,777 Yugoslavs registered in Switzerland by 1990. Immigration accelerated still more during the Yugoslav Wars. In 1995, there were more than 330,000 foreigners from former Yugoslavia residing in Switzerland, partly still registered with Yugoslavian nationality, partly under the nationality of Yugoslavia's successor states.

Registration under the successor states of Yugoslavia began gradually after 1992, but the problem remained unresolved until the year 2000. In 1998, there were still 198,131 foreign residents registered as "Yugoslavian". This number fell to 5,507 by 2000 and to zero by 2001. By 1995, there were 40,000 Macedonian citizens in Switzerland, and this number rose to 61,000 by 2002, reflecting rather re-registration of formerly Yugoslav citizens as Macedonian nationals; an estimated 50,000 emigrants from North Macedonia were Albanians. The same problem was repeated on a smaller scale with the breakaway of Montenegro from the state of Serbia and Montenegro, and Kosovo from Serbia in 2006 and 2008, respectively. The statistics for 2011 record an increase by 8,922 in the number of citizens of Kosovo, and at the same time a decrease by 10,386 in the number of citizens of Serbia. This does not reflect any real population movement, but the registrations as citizens of Kosovo by Albanians who were formerly registered as Serbian citizens.

As of 2009, nationals of successor states of Yugoslavia are registered as follows:

- Serbia and Montenegro: 187,554 (including also those with newer Serbian, Montenegrin or Kosovan passports)
- North Macedonia: 60,293
- Bosnia and Herzegovina: 37,397
- Croatia: 35,259
- Slovenia: 2,501

The number of foreign residents from former Yugoslavia naturalized as Swiss citizens in 2009 was at 14,780 (Serbia, Montenegro and Kosovo: 8,879; Bosnia and Herzegovina: 2,408; North Macedonia: 1,831; Croatia: 1,599; Slovenia: 63). This corresponds to one third of the total number of naturalizations during this year. In 2010, out of a total of 40,403 naturalizations, 13,440 were accounted for by citizens of successor states of Yugoslavia, again corresponding to one third of the total number (Serbia: 6,843, Bosnia and Herzegovina: 1,924; Kosovo 1,609; North Macedonia: 1,585; Croatia: 1,479).

== Ethnic communities ==
In terms of ethnicity, these populations consist mostly of Albanians, Bosniaks, Serbs, Croats and Macedonians. The size of each group is unknown and only amenable to rough estimates. An indicator of ethnicity can be taken from data on languages spoken in Switzerland. Unfortunately, the latest data on this was collected in the 2000 census. At that time, there were 103,000 native speakers of Serbo-Croatian, 95,000 speakers of Albanian and 61,300 speakers of Macedonian. There are various estimations made by ethnic cultural organizations.

The reception and integration varies. The Albanians have been singled out for their particularly poor image. As the largest group, they tend to be the most visible, besides the factor of prejudice against Islam, and the perceived link between immigration and crime. In a 2010 statistic, young males of the former Serbia and Montenegro (which to a large extent corresponds to the Kosovo Albanians in Switzerland) were found to have a crime rate of 310% of the young males in Swiss population, while those from Croatia, Bosnia and Herzegovina and Macedonia had crime rates of 230–240% of the Swiss value. It has been pointed out that crime rates cannot be the only reason for the poor image, as the crime rate of Sri Lankans was still higher, at 470%, while that group has much better reputation.

=== Albanians ===
Albanians constitute a significant immigrant community, estimated to have numbered 100,000 in 2006 by the Albanian government, 250,000 in 2010–2012, while today it is estimated that the number is c. 300,000. The majority of the community hails from Kosovo, central Serbia and North Macedonia. They started to immigrate in the 1970s.

Albanian organized crime controlled the major part of drug trade and heroin trade in the country. Due to crime, Albanians face prejudice. Many notable sportspeople belong to the community, such as footballers Xherdan Shaqiri, Blerim Džemaili, Granit Xhaka, Taulant Xhaka, Pajtim Kasami, Ezgjan Alioski, and others.

=== Serbs ===
Serbs constitute a significant immigrant community, estimated to number 120,000. They started to immigrate with the Gastarbeiter programme in the 1960s.

Many notable sportspeople belong to the community, such as footballers Zdravko Kuzmanović, Aleksandar Prijović, Miloš Veljković, Boris Smiljanić, and others.

=== Macedonians ===
Macedonians in Switzerland are organized through many associations and clubs, the first which was formed in 1988, and by 1991 there were five Macedonian clubs, now all part of one single organization called Združenie na Makedonskite Društva (ZMD), which was formed in 1992. The main purpose of this organisation was to encourage and spread Macedonian ideals, culture, language, and tradition.

== Notable people ==
- Mileva Marić (1875–1948), physicist, wife of Einstein, Serb, lived in Zürich.
- Leopold Ružička (1887–1976), chemist and Nobel laureate, Croat.
- Vladimir Prelog (1906–1998), chemist and Nobel laureate, Yugoslav Croat, naturalized in 1959.
- Mario Gavranović, footballer, Bosnian Croat parentage.
- Izet Hajrović, footballer, Bosniak parentage.
- Selver Hodžić, footballer, Bosnian-born Bosniak.
- Eldin Jakupović, footballer, Bosnian-born Bosniak.
- Vladimir Petković, footballer, Bosnian Croat, naturalized.
- Vero Salatić, footballer, Bosnian-born Serb.
- Haris Seferovic, footballer, Bosniak parentage.
- Josip Drmić, footballer, Bosnian Croat parentage.
- Mijat Marić, footballer, Croatian parentage.
- Ivan Rakitić, footballer, Croatian parentage.
- Boris Smiljanić, footballer, Croatian/Serbian parentage.
- Xherdan Shaqiri, footballer, Kosovo-born Albanian.
- Granit Xhaka, footballer, Kosovo Albanian parentage.
- Taulant Xhaka, footballer, Kosovo Albanian parentage.
- Amir Abrashi, footballer, Kosovo Albanian parentage.
- Valon Behrami, footballer, Kosovo-born Albanian.
- Berat Djimsiti, footballer, Serbian-born Albanian parentage.
- Ermir Lenjani, footballer, Kosovo-born Albanian.
- Blerim Džemaili, footballer, Macedonian-born Albanian.
- Ezgjan Alioski, footballer, Macedonian-born Albanian.
- Pajtim Kasami, footballer, Macedonian Albanian parentage.
- Admir Mehmedi, footballer, Macedonian-born Albanian.
- Elsad Zverotić, footballer, Montenegrin-born Bosniak.
- Aleksandar Prijović, footballer, Serbian parentage.
- Philippe Senderos, footballer, Serbian mother.
- Miloš Veljković, footballer, Serbian parentage.
- Nuri Seferi, boxer, Macedonian-born Albanian.

== See also ==
- Switzerland–Yugoslavia relations
- Kosovo–Switzerland relations
- Serbia–Switzerland relations
