= Kosovo–Switzerland relations =

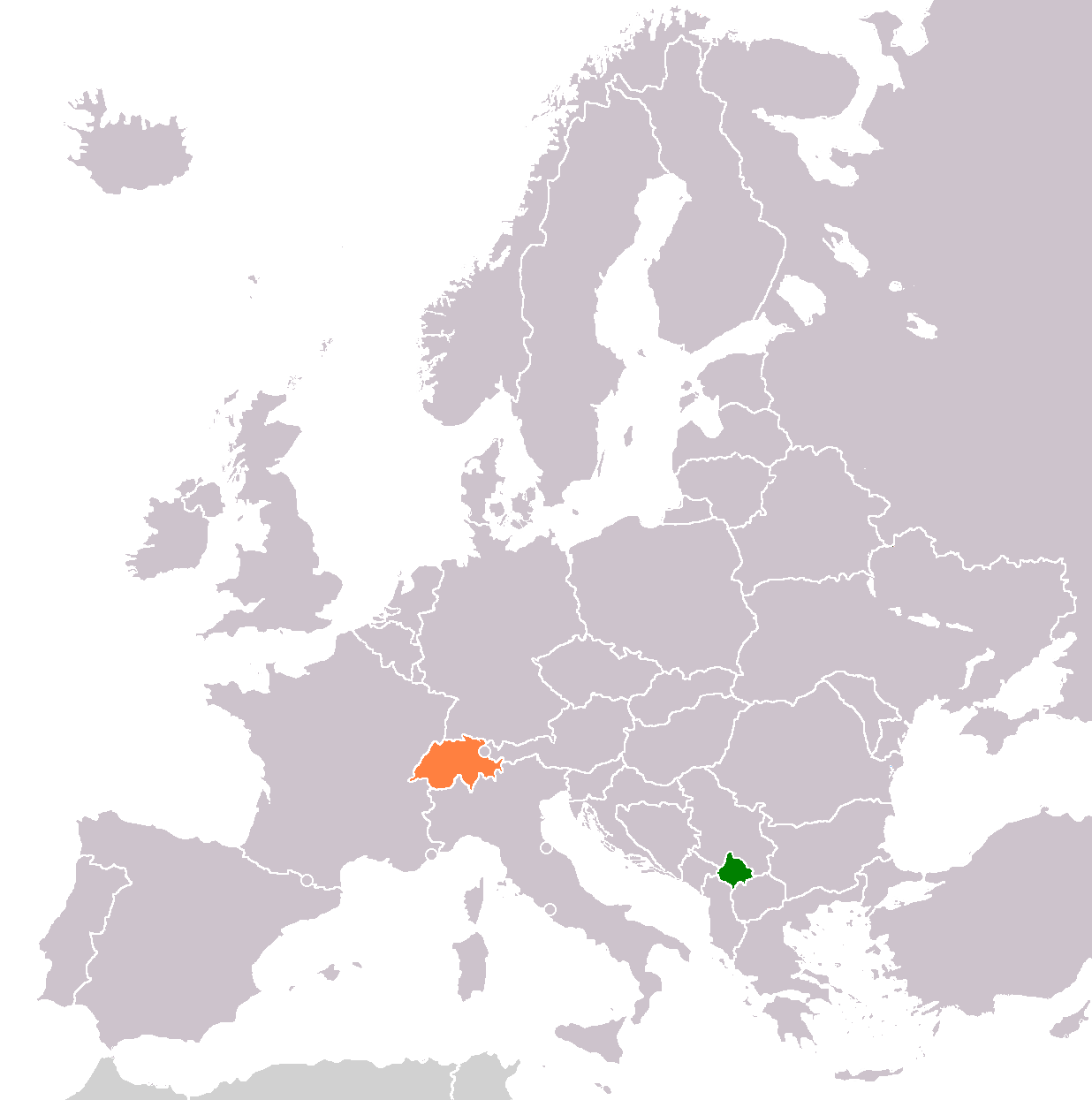
- Kosovo: Switzerland

Diplomatic mission
- Embassy of Kosovo, Bern: Embassy of Switzerland, Pristina

Envoy
- Ambassador Sami Ukelli: Ambassador Thomas Kolly

Kosovo–Switzerland relations are foreign relations between the Republic of Kosovo and the Swiss Confederation. Kosovo declared its independence from Serbia on 17 February 2008 and Switzerland recognised it on 27 February 2008. Switzerland has an embassy in Pristina since 28 March 2008. Kosovo has an embassy in Bern. In September 2008, Swiss authorities initially expressed reservation for the designated ambassador Naim Mala due to his double nationality but later accepted him.

== Military ==
Switzerland currently has 212 troops serving in Kosovo as peacekeepers in the NATO led Kosovo Force.

== See also ==
- Foreign relations of Kosovo
- Foreign relations of Switzerland
- Serbia–Switzerland relations
