= Zurich metropolitan area =

Zurich metropolitan area Metropolregion Zürich
- Metropolitan area
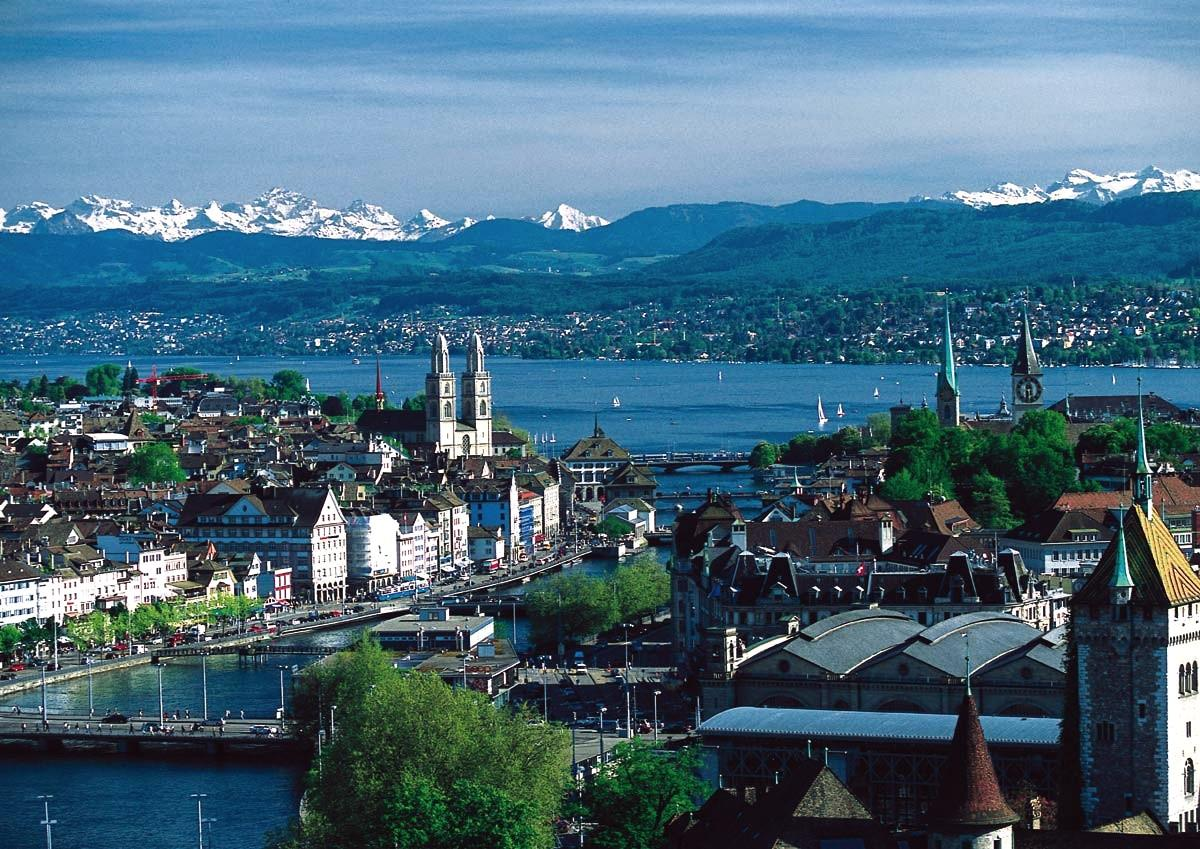
- View over Zürich and the lake

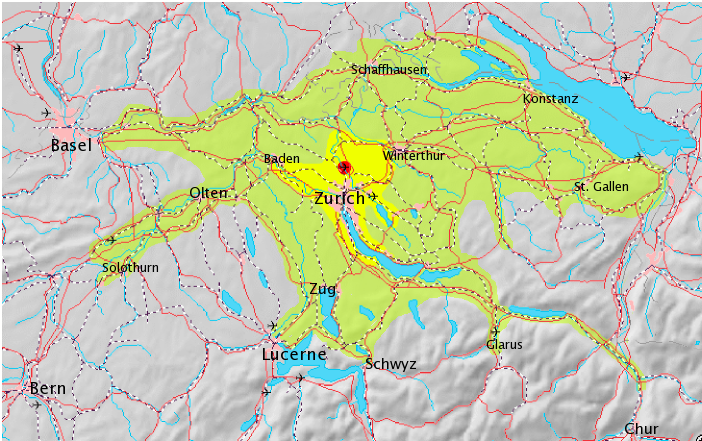
- Coordinates: 47°22′N 8°33′E
- Country: Switzerland
- Cantons: Zürich; Aargau; Schaffhausen; Schwyz; St. Gallen; Thurgau; Zug
- Districts: Several
- Principal municipalities: Total: 221; Core Cities: Zürich; Winterthur; Baden; Zug; Schaffhausen; Rapperswil; Wetzikon; Lachen; Frauenfeld; Lenzburg; Wohlen; Wil

Area
  - Total: 2,103 km^{2} (812 sq mi)

Population
  - Total: 2,100,000 (OECD FUA Estimate)
  - Density: 1,000/km^{2} (2,600/sq mi)
- Time zone: UTC+1 (CET)
  - Summer (DST): UTC+2 (CEST)
- Postal codes: 5xxx, 6xxx, 8xxxx, 9xxxx
- HDI (2021): 0.989 very high · 1st

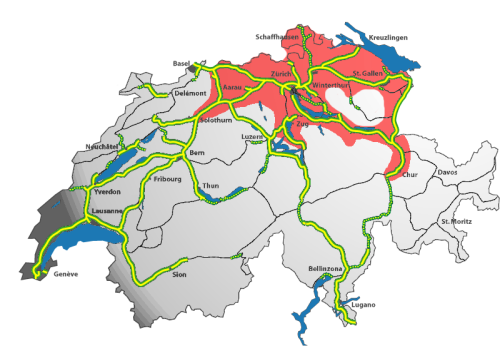
Location within Switzerland

The European Metropolitan Region of Zurich (EMRZ), also known as the Greater Zurich Area (GZA, German Zürcher Wirtschaftsraum, Metropolregion Zürich), the metropolitan area surrounding Zurich, is one of Europe's economically strongest areas and Switzerland's economic centre. It comprises the area that can be reached within a roughly 80-minute drive from Zurich Airport. Home to many international companies, it includes most of the canton of Zurich, and stretches as far as the Aargau and Solothurn in the west, Thurgau, St. Gallen and parts of Grisons in the east, Schaffhausen in the north and Zug and parts of Schwyz and Glarus in the south.

The Swiss federal office for statistics defines an unofficial metropolitan area as including all areas where more than 1/12 of the workforce commutes to the core area. According to the 2000 Swiss census, this includes a total of 220 municipalities in seven cantons: 127 in the canton of Zürich, 58 in Aargau, 11 in Schwyz, 10 in Zug, 9 in Schaffhausen, 3 in Thurgau and 2 in St. Gallen.

== Greater Zurich Area AG ==
The Greater Zurich Area AG, a nonprofit organization, is the marketing association for the Greater Zurich Area business region. It recruits international companies abroad and assists them with setting up companies and making investments in the Greater Zurich Area. Its sponsor is the Stiftung Greater Zurich Area Standortmarketing, a public-private partnership that was established in November 1998. Since that time, its membership has grown to include the cantons of Glarus, Grisons, Schaffhausen, Schwyz, Solothurn, Ticino, Uri, Zug and Zürich, the cities of Zürich and Winterthur, several businesses and universities. Switzerland and the Greater Zurich Area have the prerequisites for innovation and sustainable growth. This is due to political stability, a large talent pool and the ETH Zurich as one of the best universities in Europe as well as the University of St. Gallen as one of the leading business schools. Companies such as Google, Microsoft, IBM, Disney, ABB, Biogen, Johnson & Johnson and Roche operate important research and development (R&D) sites in the Zürich Metropolitan Area.

Important Industries:

- Life Sciences: Biotech, Medtech
- Information Technology: Artificial Intelligence, Computer Vision, Virtual Reality and Augmented Reality, Cybersecurity
- Fintech & Blockchain
- Robotics & Intelligent Systems: Robotics, Drone Technology, Computer Vision

The association Zurich Airport Region (Flughafenregion Zürich) is responsible for the business network and location promotion in the immediate vicinity of Zurich Airport. Large companies are headquartered in the Zurich Airport Region: Swissport International (Glattbrugg), Gategroup (Kloten), Dormakaba (Rümlang), SV Group (Dübendorf), SR Technics (Kloten), Hotelplan (Glattbrugg), Hewlett-Packard Switzerland (Dübendorf), Flughafen Zürich AG (Kloten), Jumbo (Dietlikon), UPC Switzerland (Wallisellen), Coca-Cola HBC Switzerland (Brüttisellen), Edelweiss Air (Kloten), CSC Switzerland (Dübendorf), Canon Switzerland (Wallisellen), Qualipet (Dietlikon), Gamma Renax (Dübendorf), Infosys Consulting (Kloten), Microsoft Switzerland (Wallisellen), Ricoh Switzerland (Wallisellen), Tchibo Switzerland (Wallisellen), Vifor Pharma (Glattbrugg).

The following eleven municipalities belong to the Swiss economic metropolis "Zurich Airport Region": Bassersdorf, Bülach, Dietlikon, Dübendorf, Kloten, Nürensdorf, Oberglatt, Opfikon, Rümlang, Wallisellen and Wangen-Brüttisellen. In the broader sense, many other communities and cities belong to the airport region of Zürich. The office of the association with over 500 members is located in Opfikon-Glattbrugg. Christoph Lang heads the office. René Huber (Mayor of Kloten) is the president of the association's board.

== See also ==
- List of metropolitan areas in Switzerland
