= Switzerland–Yugoslavia relations =

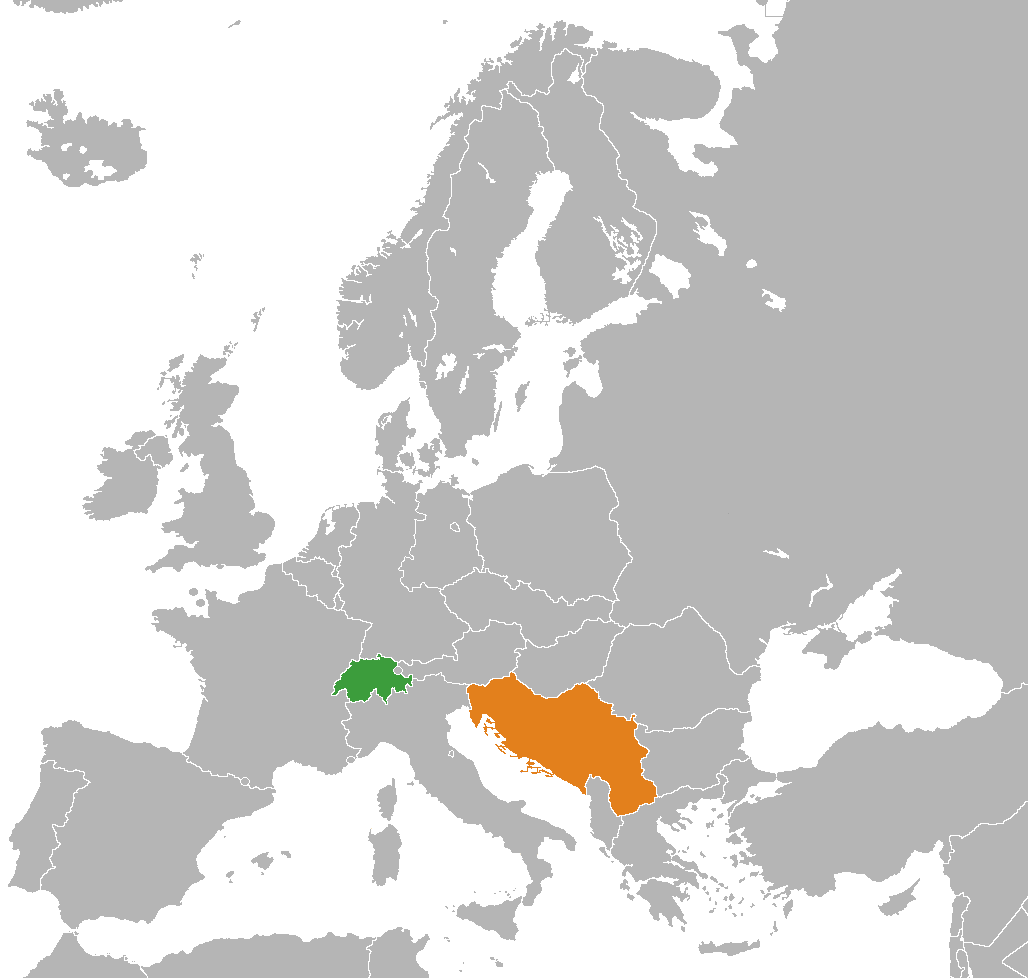

- Switzerland: Yugoslavia

Switzerland–Yugoslavia relations (German: Beziehungen Schweiz–Jugoslawien; French: Relations entre la Suisse et la Yougoslavie; Italian: Relazioni tra Svizzera e Jugoslavia; Serbian: Односи Швајцарска-Југославија; Croatian: Odnosi Švicarska i Jugoslavije; Slovene: Odnosi med Švica in Jugoslavijo; Macedonian: Односите Швајцарија-Југославија) were historical foreign relations between Switzerland and now broken up Yugoslavia (Kingdom of Yugoslavia 1918–1941 and Socialist Federal Republic of Yugoslavia 1945–1992). Switzerland established diplomatic relations with the Yugoslavia in 1919. A Swiss legation was established in Belgrade in 1940, which was upgraded to an embassy in 1957.

== Economic cooperation ==
Between 1928 and early 1960s trade between the two countries represented a typical example of trade between developed (Switzerland) and developing (Yugoslavia) country in which Yugoslavia exported its natural resources and imported industrial products and equipments. In 1972 Yugoslavia was Switzerland's 24th import and 18th export partner while Switzerland was Yugoslavia's 9th import and 14th export partner. In 1960 71% of Yugoslav export to Switzerland was natural resources while in 1970 it constituted 51% and in 1975 they dropped to 37% of the total export.

== See also ==
- Foreign relations of Switzerland
- Foreign relations of Yugoslavia
- Immigration from the former Yugoslavia to Switzerland
- Serbia–Switzerland relations
