= List of metropolitan areas in Switzerland =

List of metropolitan areas in Switzerland. Switzerland has five metropolitan areas as defined by Swiss Federal Statistics Office:

== Metropolitan areas ==
- Basel metropolitan area
- Bern metropolitan area (Espace Mittelland)
- Geneva metropolitan area (≈ Grand Genève)
- Lausanne metropolitan area
- Zürich metropolitan area

== See also ==
- List of cities in Switzerland
