= Serbia–Switzerland relations =

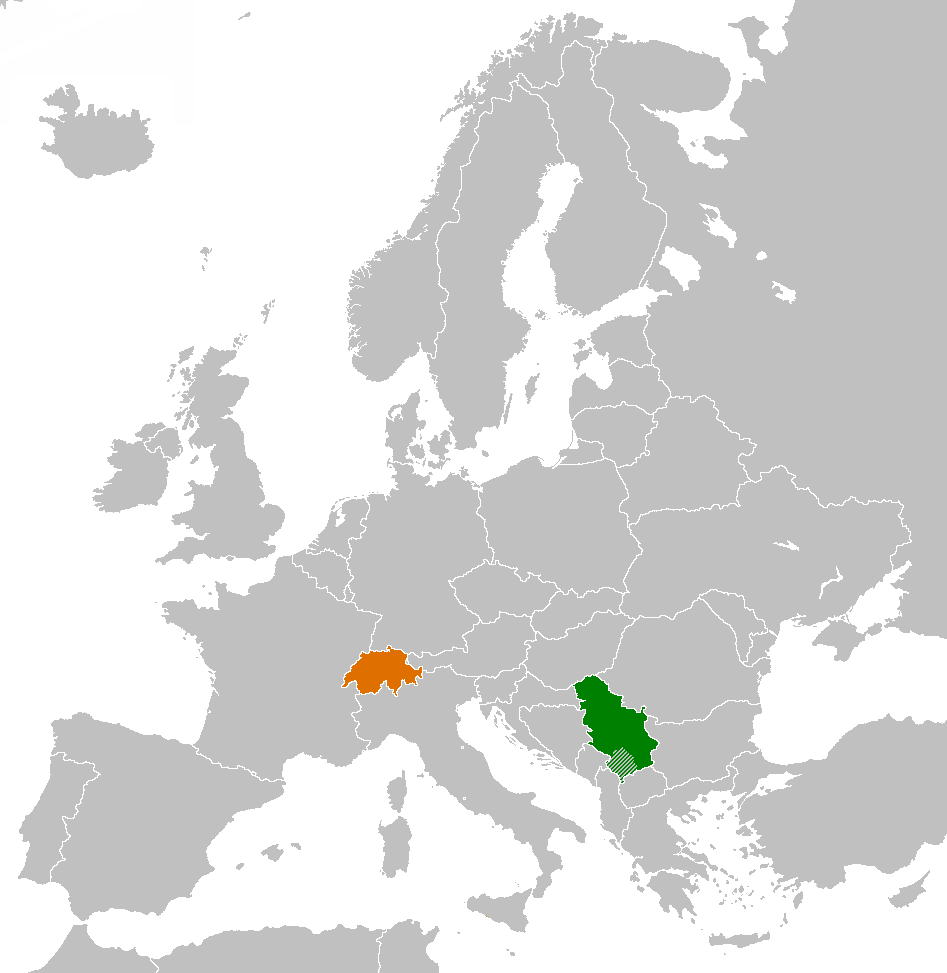
- Serbia: Switzerland

Serbia and Switzerland maintain diplomatic relations that were formally established in 1916. Between 1918 and 2006, Switzerland maintained relations with the Kingdom of Yugoslavia, the Socialist Federal Republic of Yugoslavia, and the Federal Republic of Yugoslavia. Serbia is considered the legal successor to those states.

== History ==
Switzerland recognized the Kingdom of Serbs, Croats and Slovenes in 1919, a state later renamed the Kingdom of Yugoslavia in 1929. A Swiss legation was opened in Belgrade in 1940 and was elevated to an embassy in 1957. After the breakup of Yugoslavia in the early 1990s, Switzerland continued relations with the newly formed Federal Republic of Yugoslavia, which became the State Union of Serbia and Montenegro in 2003. Following Montenegro’s independence in 2006, Serbia assumed the international treaties previously signed with Switzerland.

== Political relations ==
Today, the political relationship is structured around a series of agreements and cooperation within multilateral organizations. Switzerland maintains an embassy in Belgrade, and the two countries collaborate on economic matters, migration, education, research, and cultural exchange. Switzerland also supports Serbia's reform plans and European integration path through its 2022–2025 cooperation strategy, implemented by the Swiss Agency for Development and Cooperation (SDC), the State Secretariat for Economic Affairs (SECO), and the State Secretariat for Migration (SEM).

Both states cooperate in multilateral organizations, including the Organization for Security and Co-operation in Europe (OSCE), where they chaired consecutively in 2014 and 2015, and in the Swiss-led voting constituencies at the World Bank, the International Monetary Fund, and the European Bank for Reconstruction and Development.

== Economic relations ==
Trade between two countries amounted to $765 million in 2023; Serbia's merchandise export to Switzerland were about $263 million; Swiss exports were standing at roughly $502 million.

Swiss companies present in Serbia include Holcim (cement producing plant in Beočin), Nestle (soups and sauces plant in Šimanovci and Stara Pazova), Barry Callebaut (chocolate processing plant in Novi Sad), Coca-Cola HBC (anchor bottling plant in Belgrade), Vaider (glass plant in Paraćin), Sika (chemical sealing products plant in Pećinci).

== Immigration from Serbia ==
According to official data from 2024, there were 56,743 Serbian citizens in the Switzerland, while estimated number of people of Serb ethnic descent (including Swiss citizens with full or partial Serb ethnic descent) stands at around 120,000.

== Resident diplomatic missions ==
- Serbia has an embassy in Bern and general consulates in Geneva and Zürich.
- Switzerland has an embassy in Belgrade.
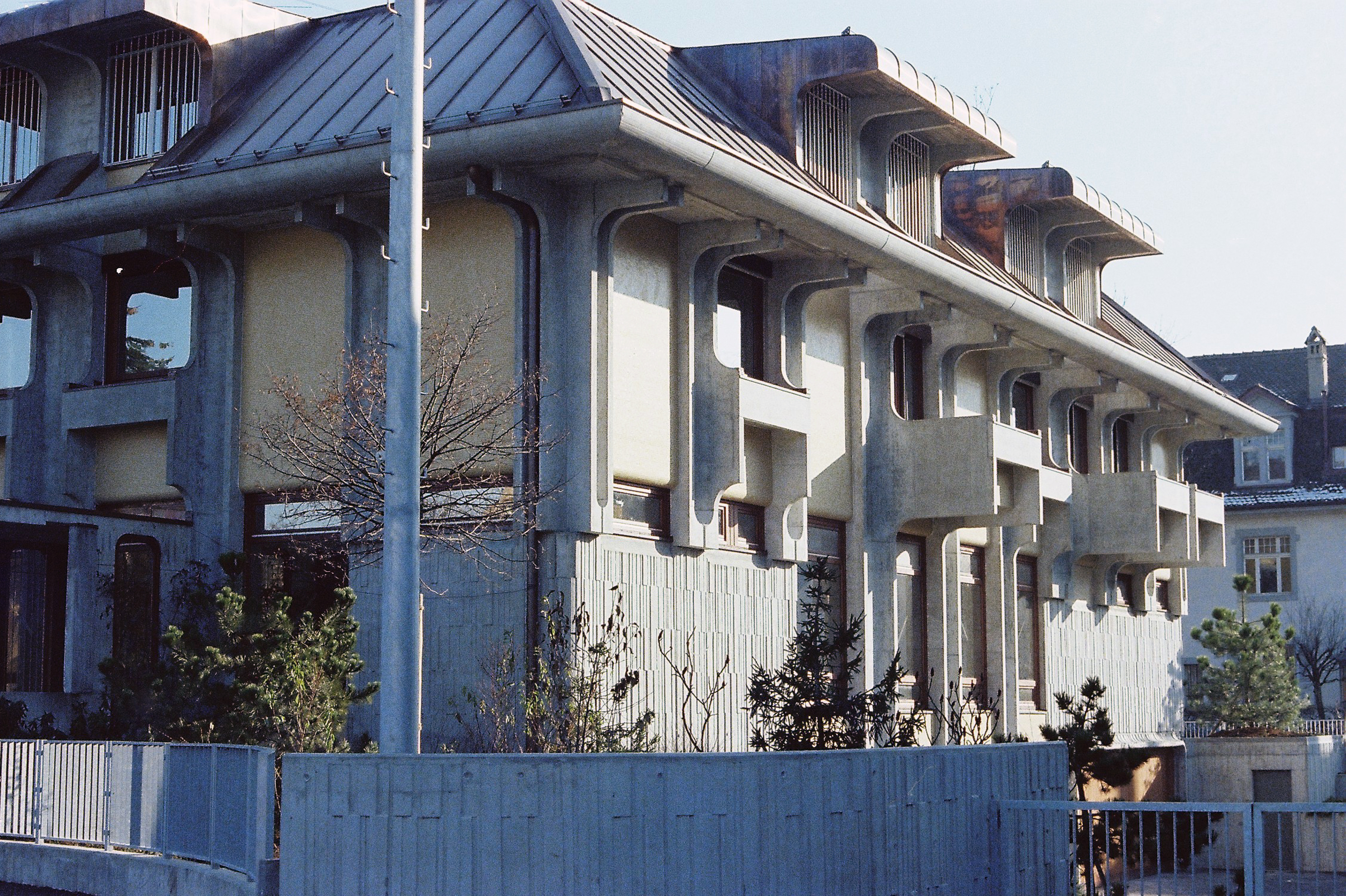
Embassy of Serbia in Bern

== See also ==
- Foreign relations of Serbia
- Foreign relations of Switzerland
- Switzerland–Yugoslavia relations
