= Standseilbahn Linth-Limmern =

Underground, industrial funicular in Glarus, Switzerland

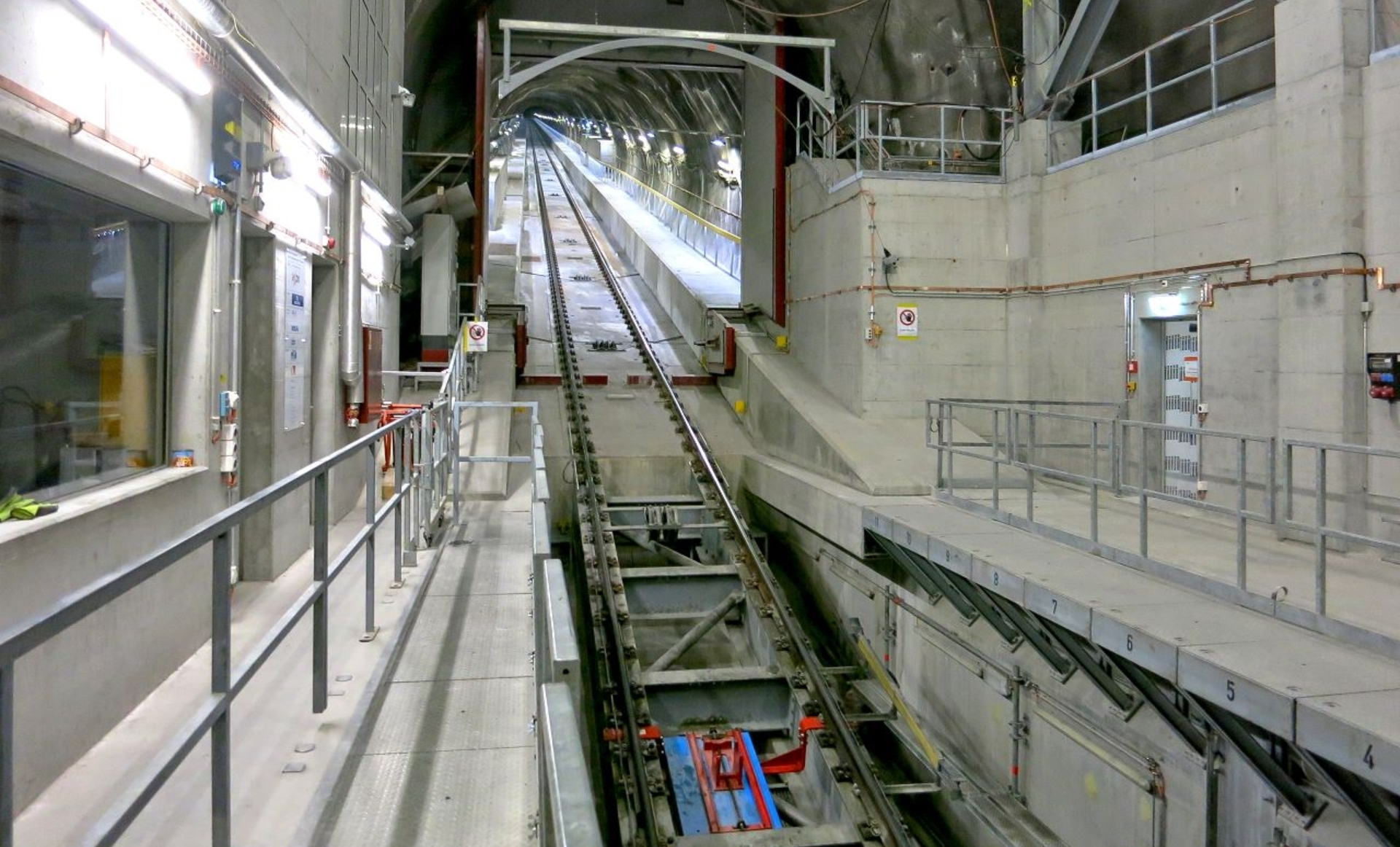
- The lower station (2020)

Overview
- Other name(s): Standseilbahn Kraftwerk Linth-Limmern Tierfehd–Maschinenkaverne; Standseilbahn Tierfehd–Maschinenkaverne; PSW Limmern Standseilbahn SSB 1 im Zugangsstollen ZS I
- Status: In operation
- Owner: Kraftwerke Linth-Limmern AG (KLL)
- Locale: Linthal, Glarus, Switzerland
- Coordinates: 46.8665°N 8.9992°E
- Termini: Tierfehd; "Maschinenkaverne Pumpspeicherwerk Limmern"
- Website: axpo.com

Service
- Type: Funicular, underground
- Rolling stock: 2 for 30 passengers or 120t each (also: 1 for 215 t)

History
- Opened: September 2013 (11 years ago)

Technical
- Line length: 3,778 m (12,395 ft)
- Number of tracks: 1 with passing loop
- Track gauge: 1,800 mm (5 ft 10 7/8 in)
- Electrification: from opening (2x 870 kW)
- Operating speed: 6 metres per second (20 ft/s) for 40 t; 0.5 metres per second (1.6 ft/s) for 215 t
- Maximum incline: 24% (constant)

The Standseilbahn Linth-Limmern is a funicular railway at the Linth-Limmern pumped storage plant in the Canton of Glarus in Switzerland. Built in 2013 for a transport capacity of 215 tonnes (237 tons), the funicular moved the four transformers of the hydroelectric plant from Tierfehd at an elevation of 816 m (2,677 ft) to the machinery cavern of the Limmern plant at 1,697 m (5,568 ft). This made it the highest-capacity funicular. The 3,778-metre-long (12,395 ft) line, passing through a tunnel, has an elevation difference of 882 m (2,894 ft) and an incline of 24 per cent. The single track has a passing loop for the descending car.

Since the completion of the plant's expansion, the funicular is used by the staff of and visitors to the hydroelectric plant. It is owned by Kraftwerke Linth-Limmern AG (KLL), a joint venture of Axpo (85%) and the Canton of Glarus (15%).

The lower station is accessed through a short tunnel from Tierfehd, near the aerial cableways to Kalktrittli and Baumgartenalp: 46.878421°N 8.98714°E.

The upper station is in the machinery cavern near the dam of Limmernsee; 46.848783°N 9.010871°E. In proximity, another underground funicular leads from Kavernenzentrale Muttsee at 1870 m to Muttenkopf at 2393 m, near Muttsee.

The funicular was built by Garaventa. A tunnel boring machine (TBM) with a diameter of 8 metres (26 ft) was used to excavate the tunnel.
