= Mühleberg Nuclear Power Plant =

Nuclear power plant in Switzerland

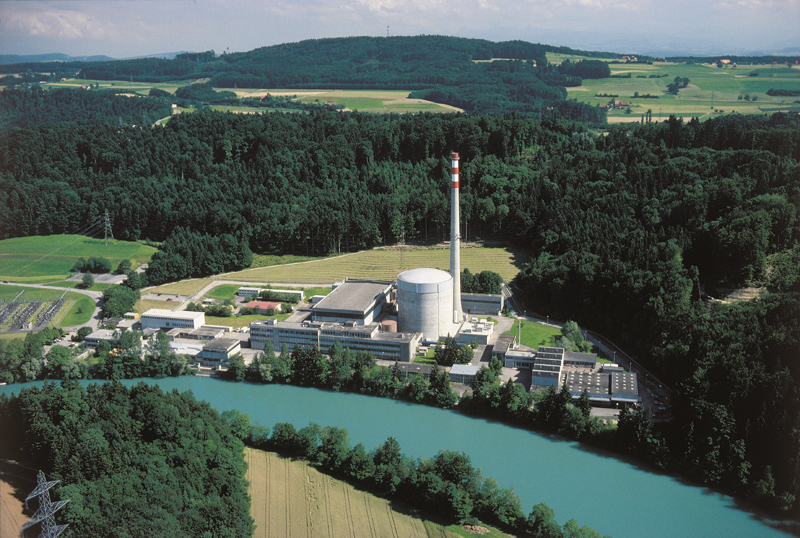
- Mühleberg Nuclear Power Plant
- Country: Switzerland
- Location: Mühleberg (Berne Canton)
- Coordinates: 46°58′8″N 7°16′5″E
- Status: Closed and being prepared for nuclear decommissioning
- Construction began: 1967 – 1971
- Commission date: 6 November 1972
- Decommission date: 20 December 2019
- Operator: BKW FMB Energie AG

Nuclear power station
- Reactor type: BWR
- Reactor supplier: General Electric

Power generation
- Units operational: 1 × 355 MW
- Make and model: 2 (Brown Boveri)
- Nameplate capacity: 355 MW
- Capacity factor: 95.6%
- Annual net output: 2,973 GW·h

External links
- Website: Official website
- Commons: Related media on Commons

Switzerland nuclear power plants (view)
Active plants
Closed plants

The Mühleberg Nuclear Power Plant (German: Kernkraftwerk Mühleberg, KKM) is a formerly operational nuclear power plant in the Mühleberg municipality in the canton of Bern, Switzerland. Operated by BKW FMB Energie AG, the plant generated power from 6 November 1972 until 20 December 2019. Nuclear decommissioning of the plant began in January 2020 and is currently forecasted to be completed by 2034.

== History ==
=== Mühleberg 1 ===
In parallel with the planning of Beznau 1, the then Bernische Kraftwerke AG decided to build a second nuclear power plant in the canton of Bern. Mühleberg was identified as possible location and the Swiss Federal Office of Energy (SFOE) approved this choice on 21 July 1965. Two years later, on 21 March 1967, a first partial construction permit was issued, followed on 7 March 1968 by the final one.

The reactor entered criticality in March 1971 but, due to a fire in the turbine housing, the plant had to be shut down for repairs. It started commercial operation on 6 November 1972.

KKM was the only Swiss nuclear power plant that did not have an unlimited operating license. Due to the problems noticed during the commissioning and to some ongoing tests on the emergency cooling systems performed in the United States, until 1980 it received a series of six-month license extensions, then increased to one year. They were followed by a five-year, a seven-year, and a ten-year license extension. These extensions were justified by technical improvements the operator was instructed to perform. The operating license was extended again in 1998 and was due to expire on 31 December 2012; however, an unlimited license was granted on 21 December 2009.

The plant had requested a limitation removal in 1990 and again in 1996, but they were both rejected by the Swiss Federal Council for political and technical reasons. A third request pending since 2005 at the SFOE was accepted on 21 December 2009.

Acceptance of the power plant by the local population has varied. When KKM was built there was little opposition to nuclear energy, but the situation rapidly changed after the accident at Three Mile Island. In 1992 a public referendum in the canton of Bern rejected granting an unlimited operating license to the power plant, with 51% voting against. In 2003, 68% of the population rejected the initiative named Strom ohne Atom, that proposed that the plant should be shut down by 2005 to be replaced by non-nuclear power generation. A similar proposal at cantonal level had already been rejected in 2000 by 64% of voters. In 2006 the Bernese government put forward a medium-term energy strategy including the renunciation to nuclear power. The Swiss parliament, however, noted this and withheld its approval, delegating any decision on an eventual shutdown to the federal authorities. The same organ in 2007 urged the Bernese government to work towards granting an unlimited operating license.

The plant was shut down on 20 December 2019 at 12:30am local time.

=== Mühleberg 2 ===
The operators, Axpo and BKW, announced through their subsidiary company, Resun AG, on 4 December 2008 that they had submitted to federal authorities a framework permit application to build two new nuclear reactors, one of which would be in Mühleberg. Although precise technical specifications were not defined, the reactor of choice should be of 3rd generation light water type with a net electric power between 1200 and 1600 MW. Cooling should be ensured by a hybrid tower. Following the Fukushima Daiichi nuclear disaster the permit application was suspended indefinitely.

== Technical specifications ==
=== Reactor and generators ===
The KKM consists of a single boiling water reactor (BWR) of type 4 provided by General Electric Technical Services Company (GETSCO), a then subsidiary of General Electric specialized in nuclear power plants. All the 240 assemblies contain uranium oxide rods. The pressurized vessel has a diameter of 4.04 m and is 19 m high, has a wall thickness of 10.2 cm and operates at 288 °C and 72 bar.

The thermal power of 1097 MW was converted into 355 MW of net electrical power by two Brown Boveri steam turbine generators connected to the 220 kV and 50 kV grids. The power output was increased in 1990 from the original 320 MW.

The system was cooled with water pumped from the Aar. This increased the river temperature by 1.3 °C, on average.

Unit	Type	Net electrical capacity	Gross electrical capacity	Construction start	Critical state	Connected to electricity grid	Commercial operation	Shutdown
Mühleberg	BWR	355 MW	372 MW	Mar. 1967	Mar. 1971	Jul. 1971	Nov. 1972	Dec. 2019

=== Safety measures ===
As with all Swiss nuclear power plants, the KKM is subjected to a periodic complete safety assessment. The most recent one took place in 2007.

The reactor is hosted in a five-floor concrete-steel building. The walls have a thickness of 60 cm. In its lowest, partially underground part is located the 1.7–1.8 m thick steel and concrete pressure suppression drywell. The structure is designed to withstand an earthquake. In case of a plane crash, the building could be damaged but the reactor would remain intact due to the five 30–50 cm thick insoles and the massive drywell.

The reactor was fed with water through two loops, each provided with its own pump. A third pump served as reserve.

The emergency cooling of the core was entrusted to three independent systems. A doubly redundant low pressure core spray with a 2·100% heat removal capacity is activated in case of serious leaks in the coolant system. Small leaks could be compensated by the redundant alternate low pressure system (ALPS).

By loss of cooling agent in the drywell, the excessive water would spread into a torus-shaped pressure-suppression pool. The 4000 m^{3} big torus is filled with 2000 m^{3} water and is in turn cooled by a redundant torus cooling system and a redundant shutdown and torus cooling system with a total of 4·100% residual heat removal capacity.

Emergency power is provided through two connections with the nearby Mühleberg Hydroelectric Power Plant and three diesel generators.

In 1989, the SUSAN (Selbstständiges, unabhängiges System zur Abfuhr der Nachzerfallswärme) emergency building started operation. Bunkerized and partially underground, its function is to ensure an emergency shutdown of the reactor even in case of extreme external agents like plane crashes or simultaneous downfall of the dams upstream the plant with resulting submergence of the structures. Amongst others it contains the RCIC, the ALPS, the TCS and two of the three emergency diesel generators.

=== Waste management ===
The KKM yearly produced around 35–38 m^{3} of low and medium level radioactive waste. The waste is compressed in situ and transferred to the Central Interim Storage Facility (ZZL) in Würenlingen for conditioning. BKW staff estimated the storage capabilities on the KKM-site would last at least until 2022. Due to the 2006 moratorium on the recycling of spent fuel, the entire stock of exhausted rods was transferred to the ZZL for storage.

== Cracks in some parts ==
Major concerns about the safety of the reactor arose from the formation of cracks in the core shroud inside the reactor vessel since the 1990s. This is due to steel corrosion by the coolant. In spite of reinforcements of the shell, and chemical additives in the coolant, the cracks were increasing in length year after year. The longest crack is one third of the limit allowed by the safety specifications and it was expected that by 2012 it would have been less than half of this value. The situation is continuously monitored and other chemical measures for its stabilization were tested.

In 1986, due to the presence of similar cracks, some components of the cooling water circulation loop had to be replaced. A substitution of the core shroud or the pressure vessel was not considered necessary by the Swiss Federal Nuclear Safety Inspectorate (ENSI) that confirmed that the power plant was able to operate safely at least until 2012, when the license expired provisionally.

== Nuclear events ==
Year	INES level								Total
Year	0	1	2	3	4	5	6	7	Total
2015	–	–	–	–	–	–	–	–	TBA
2014	8	–	–	–	–	–	–	–	8
2013	13	–	–	–	–	–	–	–	13
2008	1	–	–	–	–	–	–	–	1
2007	1	–	–	–	–	–	–	–	1
2006	2	–	–	–	–	–	–	–	2
2005	1	–	–	–	–	–	–	–	1
2004	1	–	–	–	–	–	–	–	1
2003	4	–	–	–	–	–	–	–	4
2002	2	–	–	–	–	–	–	–	2
2001	1	–	–	–	–	–	–	–	1
2000	–	–	–	–	–	–	–	–	0
1999	3	–	–	–	–	–	–	–	3
1998	–	1	–	–	–	–	–	–	1
1997	3	–	–	–	–	–	–	–	3
1996	2	–	–	–	–	–	–	–	2
1995	1	–	–	–	–	–	–	–	1
Sources: 2014 · 2013 · 2012

Until the definitive shutdown in 2019, no operative nuclear event (INES level 1 or above) had occurred. Since 1995 one anomaly of INES 1 took place.

=== Level 1 events ===
==== 1998 ====
- During a routine check of the reactor protection system in June 1998, a technician opened a steam relief valve in error. The steam that escaped condensed within the torus and heated the water it contained. After 14 minutes the raised temperature within the torus triggered an emergency shutdown of the reactor. The opening of the incorrect valve and the delay before the control room staff reacted appropriately led the event to be classified as INES level 1 (Swiss scale level B).

=== Significant events before 1995 ===
- In September 1986 a faulty filter in the reconditioning unit for low and middle-active waste leaked a small quantity of radioactive aerosol. As result the surrounding area now shows an anthropogenic average dose rate of 0.0051 mSv/y (status 2007). For comparison the corresponding Swiss legal limit for population exposure is 0.3 mSv/y and the natural dose in the Mühleberg region is 1 mSv/y.
- In July 1971, during systems tests prior to full commercial operation, some turbine oil ignited. The fire damaged the turbine's housing, including cables connected to safety systems. Sufficient safety system connections remained to allow the reactor to be shut down. The nuclear part of the plant was not affected, but the power generation systems needed extensive repairs. The incident caused the start of commercial operation to be delayed.

=== March 2012: court order to scrap the reactor ===
After the request by an anti-nuclear group the Federal Administrative Court of Switzerland ruled in March 2012 that BKW FMB Energy should shut down the reactor by mid-2013. In its rulings the court cited the incomplete repair of cracks in the structures inside the reactor. Besides this the verdict mentioned the safety concerns related to the plant's earthquake resistance. The Swiss NPPs - Mühleberg included - are judged to be safe in earthquakes by the ENSI and the European Nuclear Security Regulators Group (ENSREG). The decision was to take effect if safe operation could not be demonstrated until mid-2013.

== See also ==
- Nuclear power in Switzerland
- Resun
