= Böttstein Castle =

Castle in Böttstein, Switzerland

- Schloss Böttstein
- Böttstein
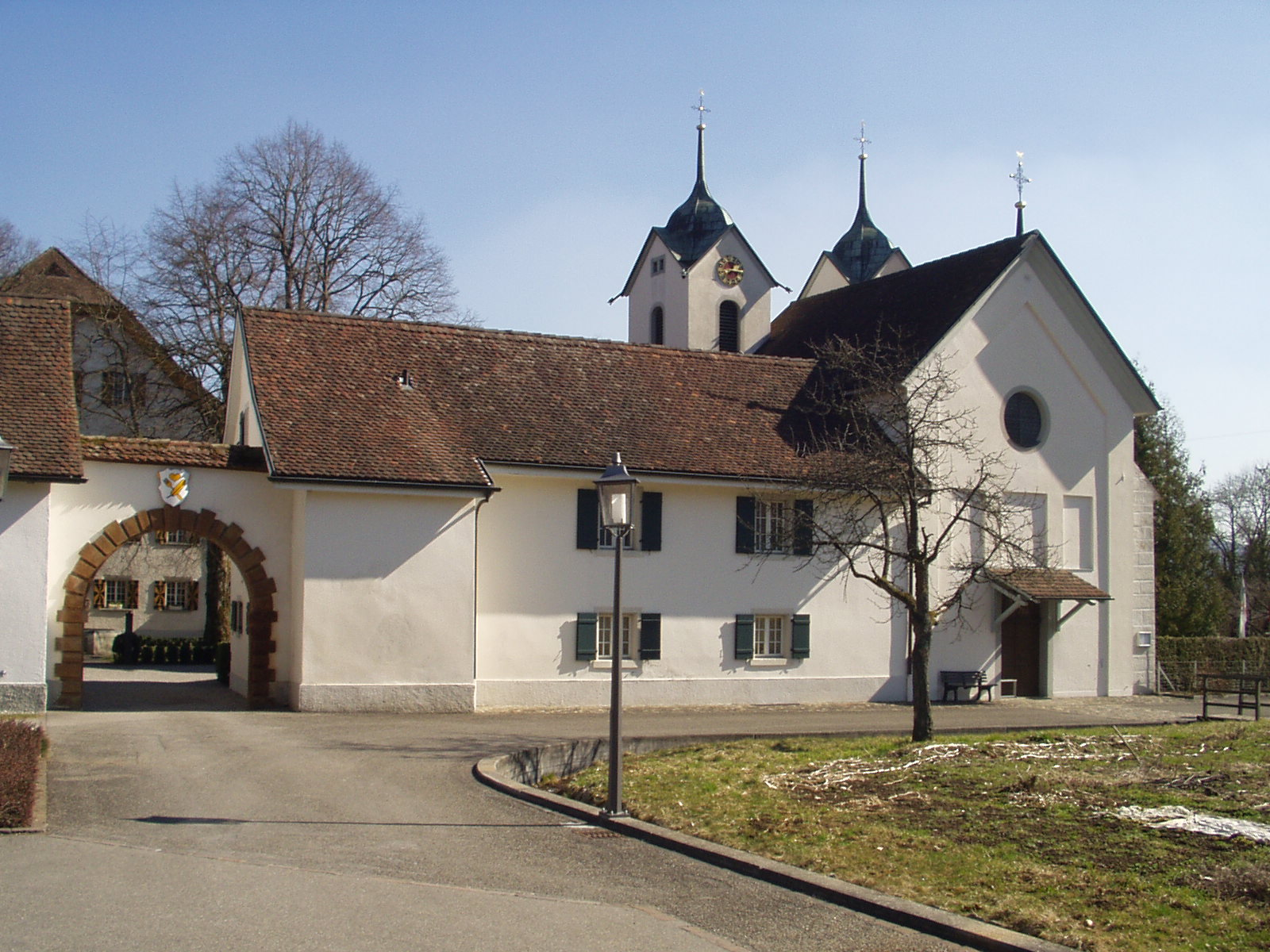
- Böttstein Castle

Site information
- Code: CH-AG
- Condition: preserved

Location
- Coordinates: 47°33′14.80″N 8°13′27.23″E

Site history
- Built: 1100–1200

Böttstein Castle is a castle in the municipality of Böttstein in the canton of Aargau in Switzerland.

== History ==
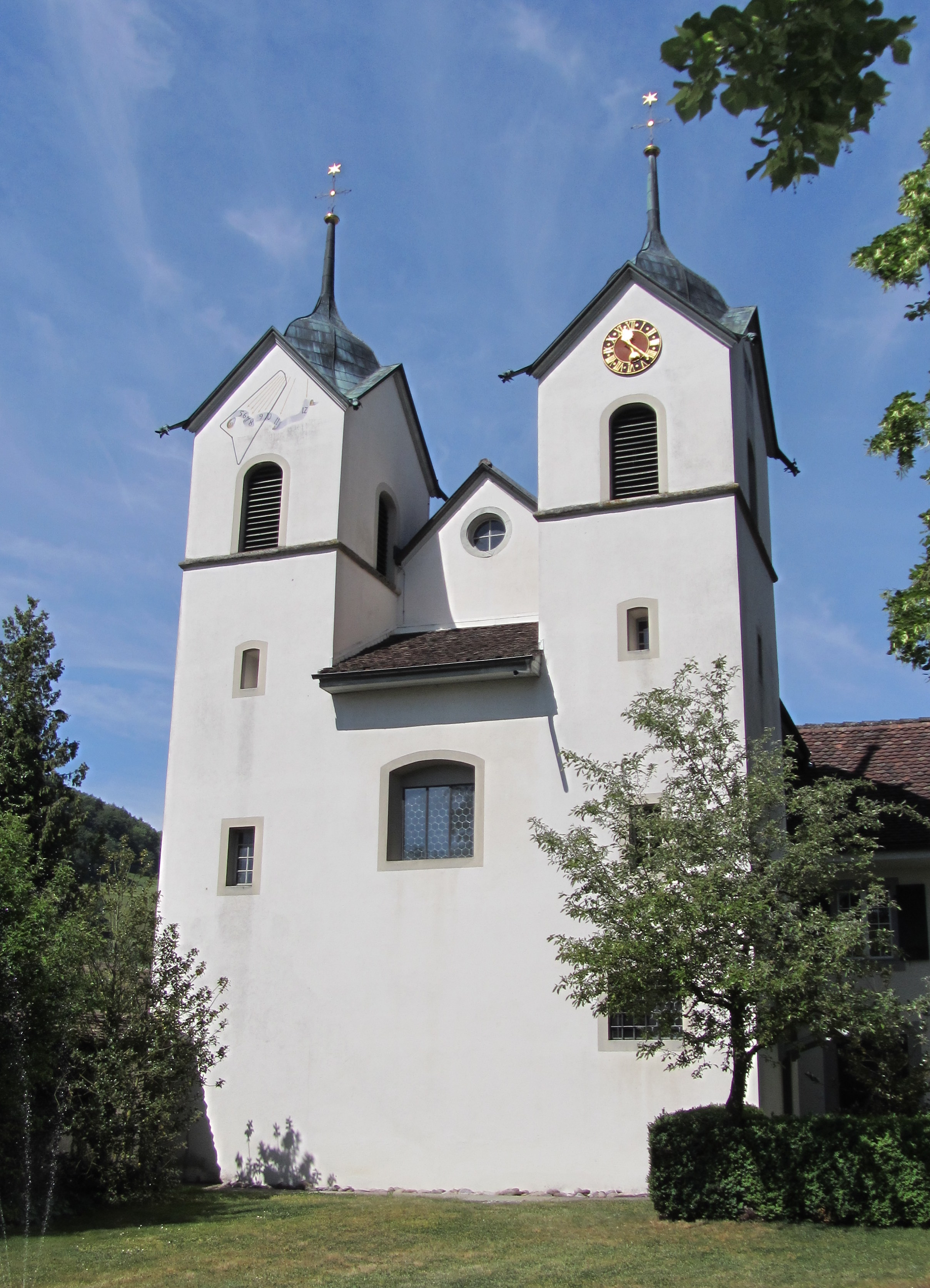
Böttstein Castle chapel

The castle was built in the 12th century for the Barons of Böttstein. The family first appears in a historical records in 1087, though they died out in the early 13th century. The family was subject to the Earl of Frickgau, which included the Homberg-Tierstein family and after 1231, the Habsburgs. After the extinction of the Böttstein line, the castle became the property of the Barons of Tiefenstein in the 13th century. In 1361 the Lords of Wessenberg were granted the castle and surrounding villages as a fief by Duke Rudolf of Austria. After the Old Swiss Confederacy conquered the Aargau in 1415, the local rulers and their jurisdiction remained the same, only the overlords changed. The villages and castle passed through a number of owners until 1563 when they were sold to the Lords of Hallwil. After passing through several other owners on 5 June 1606 the von Roll brothers, Johann Peter, Johann Walter and Karl Emanuel, bought Böttstein for 1,800 florins. They were joined in 1615 by a fourth brother, Johann Ludwig.

In the same year, the von Roll brothers demolished parts of the old castle and began building a new castle and chapel. In 1654 the von Roll estates were divided and Johann Peter inherited the castle. It passed down to his son Karl Ernst, who only had a daughter, named Anna Maria Magdalena von Roll. In 1674 she married Johann Martin Schmid von Bellikon, bringing castle into the von Bellikon family. They owned the surrounding villages until the 1798 French Invasion and the creation of the Helvetic Republic abolished much of the power of the nobility. Böttstein became part of the Helvetic Canton of Baden until the collapse of the Republic and the 1803 Act of Mediation in which the modern Canton of Aargau was created. Despite losing their power over the village, the family retained the castle until 1893. The following year the castle became a monastery of a spiritual organization that called itself Internationales Töchterinstitut (International Daughter's Institute). The Institute quickly disbanded and the castle passed through a number of owners until 1965.

In that year it was acquired by Nordostschweizerische Kraftwerke AG (today Axpo Holding), an association of cantonal power companies in north-east Switzerland. The castle was used to provide office space for the technical department during construction of the Beznau Nuclear Power Plant. It was renovated in 1971-1974 and converted into a country restaurant and hotel. After being sold by Axpo Holding, the Castle today remains in Private ownership. The Castle continues to be a country hotel and restaurants

== See also ==
- List of castles and fortresses in Switzerland
