= BKW Energie =

Power production and distribution utility in Switzerland

BKW Energie AG
- Type: Aktiengesellschaft
- Traded as: SIX: BKW; SMI MID component
- ISIN: CH0130293662
- Industry: Electrical power
- Founded: 1898
- Headquarters: Bern, Switzerland
- Key people: Roger Baillod (chairman); Robert Itschner (CEO)
- Products: Production and distribution of electrical power
- Revenue: 5.20 billion CHF (2022)
- Operating income: 1.04 billion CHF (2022)
- Net income: ▲712.9 million CHF (2022)
- Number of employees: 11,500 (2022)
- Website: www.bkw.ch

BKW Energie AG (BKW; formerly known as Bernische Kraftwerke AG) is a power production and distribution utility with its headquarters in Bern, Switzerland. It also provides gas and heat through a number of subsidiaries or partner companies. It mainly operates in the canton of Bern, but is also present in Italy, Germany and Austria.

== History ==
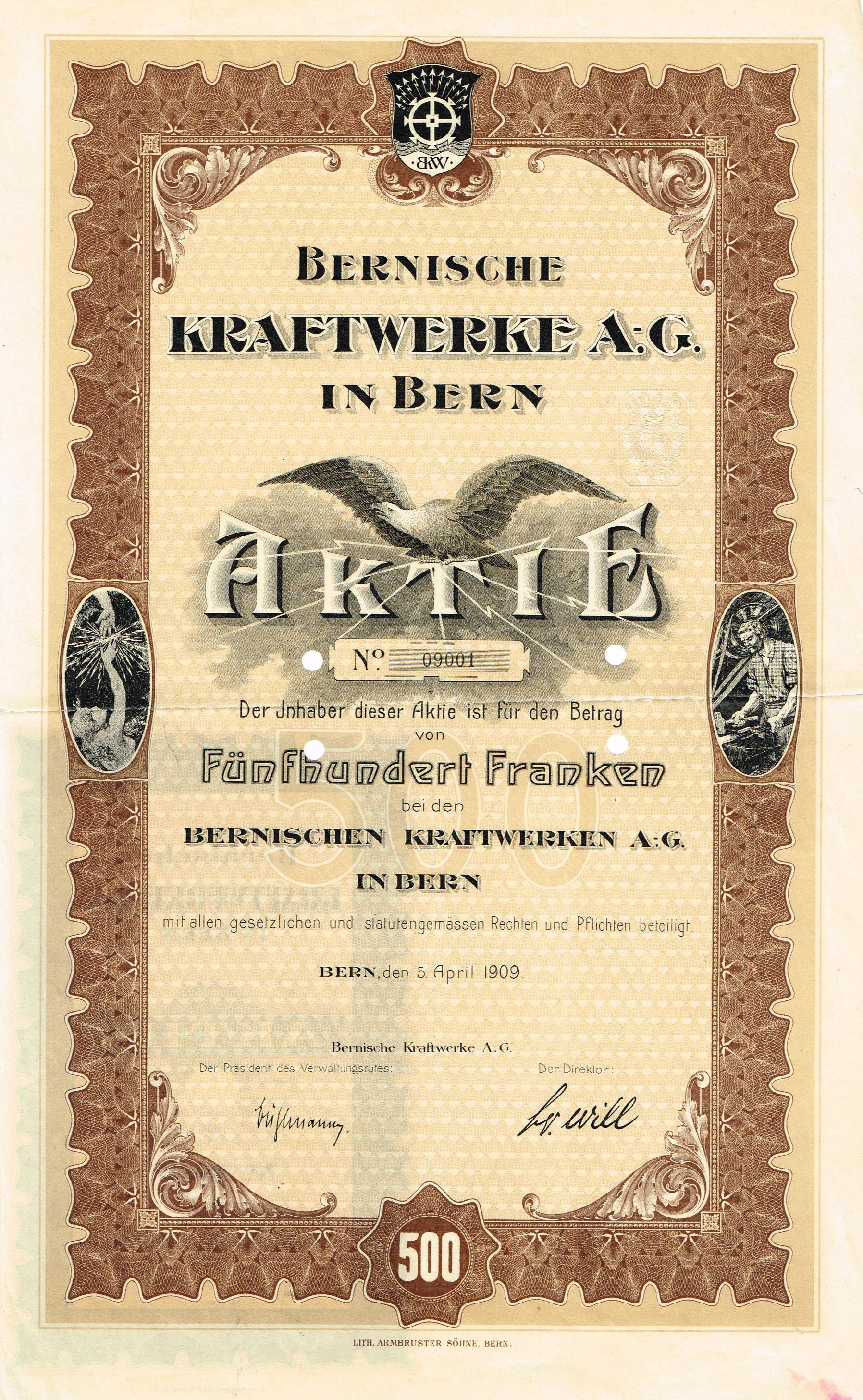
Share of the Bernische Kraftwerke AG, issued 5. April 1909

BKW was founded in 1898 as Aktiengesellschaft Elektrizitätswerk Hagneck. The name was changed to Bernische Kraftwerke AG in 1909. In 1995, it changed to its present name. BKW FMB Energie AG, to emphasize the internationalization of the company's business plan.

It has been quoted on the BX Swiss since 1969. As from 2003, it is also present at the Swiss Stock Exchange. The largest shareholder is the canton of Bern, with 52.54%. The Swiss energy provider Groupe E SA holds a further 10% of BKW. Although the German power company E.ON Energie AG once also had a large stake (20.99% share as of 2007), in 2010 it began selling off its share of BKW. By 2014 E.ON had only 6.7 of BKW and took steps to sell its remaining stake via exchangeable bonds, completing its divestiture by October of that year.

Since 2013 the board chair of BKW Group has been Roger Baillod. The CEO is Robert Itschner, who took over from Suzanne Thoma in late 2022. Head of finances is Martin Zwyssig.

In its annual report for 2022, BKW reported revenue of CHF 5.199 billion, an increase of 46% over 2021, and record-high earnings before interest and taxes (EBIT) of CHF 1.038 billion (+163% over 2021). Net profit increased 191% to CHF 712.9 million. The total employee count grew by some 800 new workers to 11,500.

== Power production ==
With a yearly energy sale of 24.2 TW⋅h the BKW is one of the biggest Swiss power utilities. Of this, 9.7 TW⋅h is produced by own plants or by shares in other facilities. As of 2007 the mix is mainly composed of nuclear (61.87%) and hydroelectric (37.96%) power. The remainder is produced by renewable sources like solar, wind, or biomass. Due to the necessity to diversify the mix and satisfy the increasing demand, BKW is introducing some fossil fuel power through shares in abroad plants.

=== Fossil fuel power ===
In 2008 a new 800 MW combined cycle gas power plant started operation in Livorno Ferraris (province of Vercelli, Italy). BKW possesses a 25% share.

=== Hydroelectric power ===
BKW produces up to 52% of its power through owned or shared hydroelectric plants in Switzerland and Italy.

The owned plants are located mainly in Bern canton:

- Aarberg, Bern canton: 15.2 MW installed load, owned plant
- Bannwil, Bern canton: 28.5 MW installed load, owned plant
- Kallnach, Bern canton: 8.1 MW installed load, owned plant
- Kandergrund, Bern canton: 18.8 MW installed load, owned plant
- Mühleberg, Bern canton: 45 MW installed load, owned plant
- Niederried, Bern canton: 15 MW installed load, owned plant
- Schattenhalb, Bern canton, two plants: 12 MW (2.3 + 9.7) combined installed load, owned plants
- Spiez, Bern canton: 18.6 MW installed load, owned plant

Some of the group companies also produce hydroelectric power. The BKW portions of the installed production are:

- EW Grindelwald AG, Bern canton: 1.5 MW
- EWR Energie AG, Bern canton: 6.5 MW
- Idroelettrica Lombarda Srl, provinces of Bergamo and Brescia (Italy): 41.8 MW
- Société des forces électriques de la Goule, Bern canton: 5.2 MW
- Onyx Energie Mittelland, Bern canton: 20.2 MW
- Simmentaler Kraftwerke AG, Bern canton: 30.1 MW

The rest is generated through holdings. The production portions of the BKW are:

- Kraftwerke Oberhasli AG, Bern canton: 531.0 MW
- Engadiner Kraftwerke AG, Graubünden (Switzerland): 128.0 MW
- Grande Dixence SA, Valais (Switzerland): 90.0 MW
- Kraftwerke Mauvoisin AG, Valais (Switzerland): 77.2 MW
- Gommerkraftwerke AG, Valais (Switzerland): 50.0 MW
- Maggia Kraftwerke AG, Ticino (Switzerland): 62.0 MW
- Blenio Kraftwerke AG, Ticino (Switzerland): 47.0 MW
- Kraftwerke Hinterrhein AG, Graubünden (Switzerland): 50.0 MW
- Electra-Massa AG, Valais (Switzerland): 54.8 MW
- Bielersee Kraftwerke AG, Bern canton: 9.7 MW
- Kraftwerke Mattmark AG, Valais (Switzerland): 26.4 MW
- Flumenthal, Bern canton: 8.2 MW purchase right
- Electricité de la Lienne SA, Valais (Switzerland): 26.7 MW
- Kraftwerke Sanetsch AG, Bern canton: 9.0 MW
- Aarewerke AG, Aargau (Switzerland): 4.0 MW

=== Nuclear power ===
Around 60% of the energy produced comes from nuclear plants. BKW owns the Mühleberg Nuclear Power Plant and three shares in other Swiss or French facilities:

- Cattenom Nuclear Power Plant, department of Moselle (France): 5200 MW net electric output, ca. 6% share
- Fessenheim Nuclear Power Plant, department of Haut-Rhin (France): 1760 MW net electric output, 10% share
- Leibstadt Nuclear Power Plant, Aargau (Switzerland): 1165 MW net electric output, 9.25% share
- Mühleberg Nuclear Power Plant, Bern canton: 355 MW net electric output, owned plant

=== Solar power ===
BKW possesses or shares an increasing number of solar plants of various size. The most important are:

- Mont-Soleil, Bern canton: 560 kW installed power, 17.8% output share
- Stade de Suisse, Bern canton: 1300 kW installed power, owned plant

=== Wind power ===
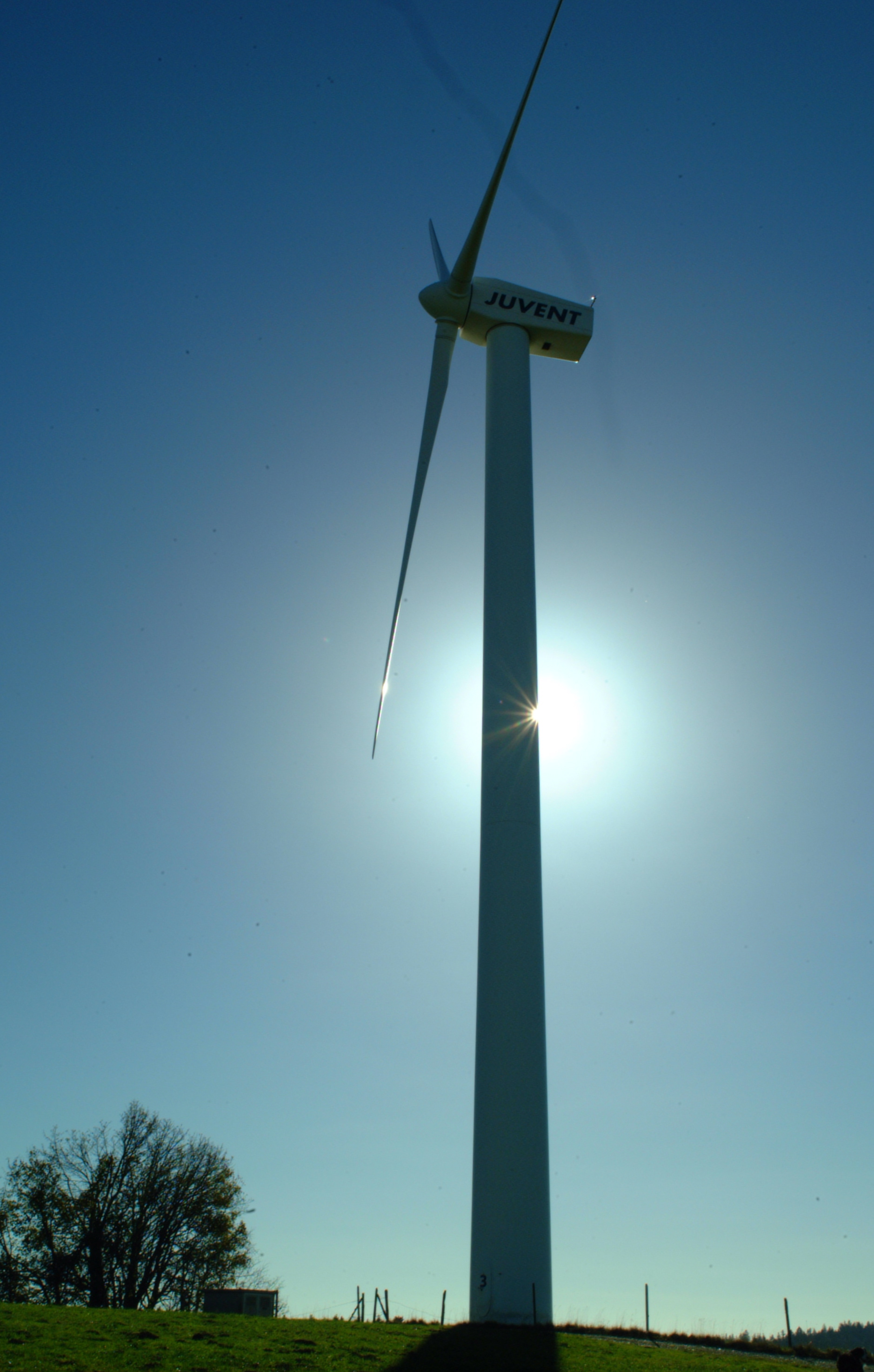
Juvent wind power plant

BKW produces wind power at two plants:

- Juvent Wind Power Plant, Bern canton: 7.7 MW power output, 60% share
- Bockelwitz Wind Power Plant, Saxony (Germany): 15 MW power output, owned plant

=== Major future developments ===
==== Biomass power ====
- BKW has a 25% share in an 11 MW biomass power plant in construction in Pignataro Maggiore (province of Caserta, Italy). Operation should start in 2009.
- In Ottana (province of Nuoro, Italy) BKW is present with a 10.5% share in a 35 MW biomass plant. The commercial operation should start in 2009.

==== Fossil fuel power ====
- In 2008 started the construction of a new 800 MW coal power plant in the city of Wilhelmshaven (Lower Saxony, Germany). BKW takes part to the project with a 33% share (240 MW). It should start production in 2012.
- BKW is considering to build with other partners a 900 MW coal power plant in Dörpen (Lower Saxony, Germany).
- The Papierfabrik Utzenstorf AG and BKW are planning to build in Utzenstorf (canton of Bern, Switzerland) a combined cycle gas power plant. It should start operation in 2016 and deliver power, steam and heat.
- Irsina (province of Matera, Italy) has been chosen as possible location for a planned 400 MW combined cycle gas power plant.

==== Hydroelectric power ====
- In 2008, BKW started construction of a new run-of-the-river plant on the Alpbach torrent in Kandersteg (canton of Bern, Switzerland). The 2.6 MW installation should start production in 2009. BKW possesses a 60% share.
- BKW has an 80% share in a company that is building a new small hydroelectric plant in Wiler (Valais, Switzerland). The 1.4 MW station should start operation in 2010.
- Schattenhalb 3 is a new 10 MW hydroelectric power plant which construction started in 2008. It is located in Schattenhalb (canton of Bern, Switzerland) and is planned to start production in 2010. It will be operated by a subsidiary of BKW.
- BKW and the municipality of Tinizong-Rona (canton of Graubünden, Switzerland) will build a new 7.5 MW plant that will exploit the Errbach torrent.

==== Nuclear power ====
In the 2020s, the Mühleberg Nuclear Power Plant will probably cease its activity and the contracts for importing nuclear energy from France will expire. BKW and Axpo founded Resun AG to prevent the consequent energy lack. Its purpose is to manage the administrative procedure for building two new nuclear plants up to 1600 MW each.

== Transmission grid ==
BKW provides around one million people in 400 municipalities in Bern Canton and surroundings with power, through its local and distribution networks of up to 132 kV. It also owns 665 km of 220 kV and 56 km of 380 kV lines, although their operation is entrusted to the national transmission company Swissgrid.
