= Resun =

Company in Aarau, Switzerland

Resun AG
- Company type: Private
- Industry: Nuclear energy
- Founded: 2008
- Headquarters: Aarau, Switzerland
- Key people: Manfred Thumann (Chairman); Hermann Ineichen, (Vice chairman); Sönke Hacker (Managing director)
- Website: www.resun.ch

Resun AG (an acronym from the French REmplacement SUisse Nucléaire, Swiss nuclear replacement) was a company located in Aarau, Switzerland. Its purpose was to manage the construction of two new nuclear reactors. These are unofficially known as Beznau 3 and Mühleberg 2 from the locations where they should be built. In August 2017 the company was liquidated.

After 2020 the existing plants of Beznau (1969, 730 MW) and Mühleberg (1972, 355 MW) should cease activity. At the same time some import contracts with France for around 2000 MW will expire. With a combined electrical power output of 3200 MW, the new reactors would prevent the resulting energy gap and satisfy the expected domestic demand increase.

== Stockholders ==
Resun AG is a privately held company whose shares are controlled by the BKW FMB Energie AG (present owner of the Mühleberg Nuclear Power Plant, 31.25%) and the Axpo subsidiaries Nordostschweizerische Kraftwerke AG (present owner of the Beznau Nuclear Power Plant, 57.75%) and Centralschweizerische Kraftwerke AG (11%).
