= KKM =

KKM may refer to:

- Knaster–Kuratowski–Mazurkiewicz lemma, in mathematics
- Kyo Kara Maoh!, a series of Japanese light novels
- Kola Kolaya Mundhirika, a 2010 Tamil comedy film
- KKM, a song by the music group Miracle Legion from their 1996 album Portrait of a Damaged Family
- Khel Khel Mein (खेल खेल में), a 2024 Hindi dramedy film
- Mühleberg Nuclear Power Plant (German: Kernkraftwerk Mühleberg)
