= Selbsanft =

Mountain in Switzerland

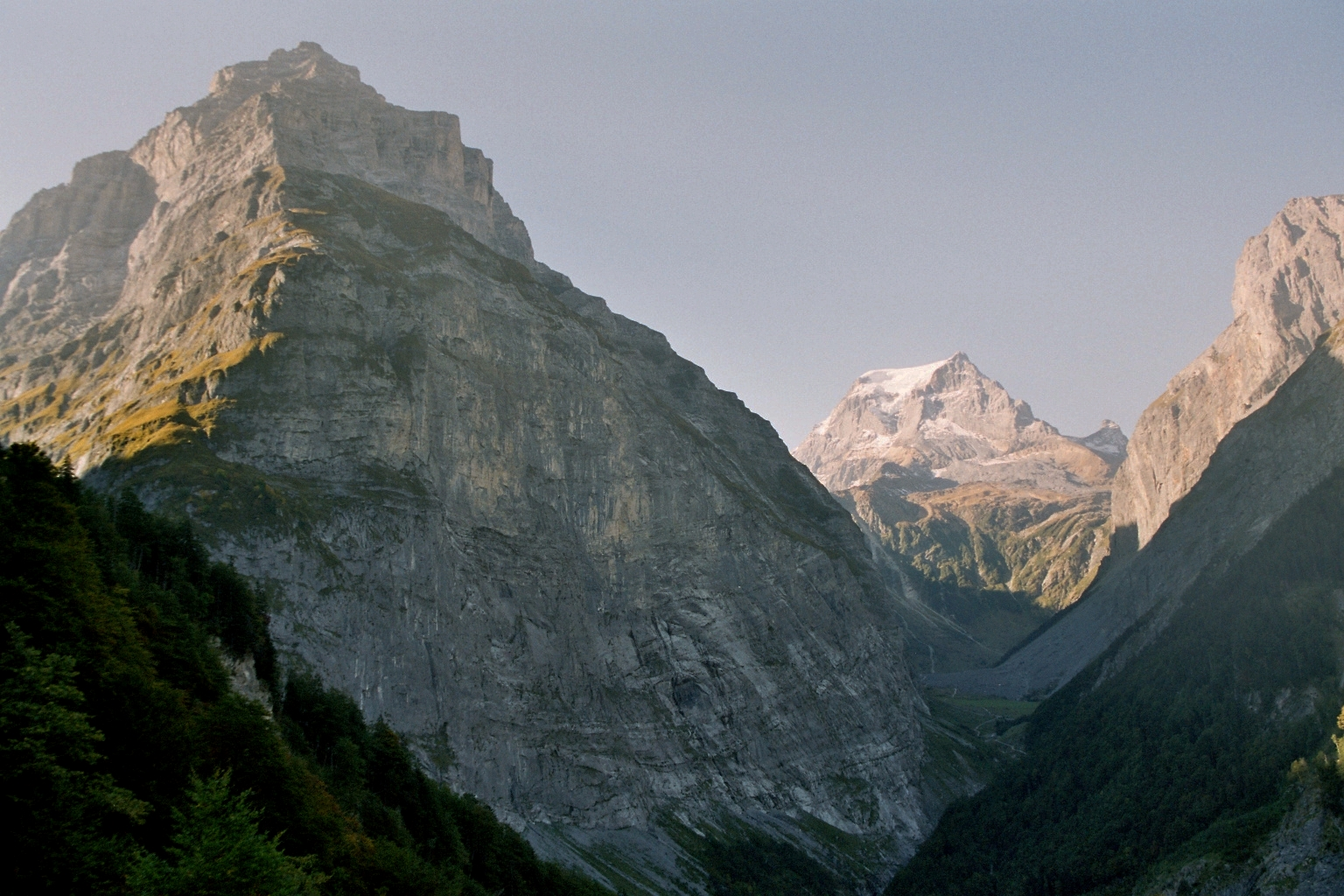
- Vorder Selbsanft (left, also known as Hauserhorn), Tödi (middle, with the two summits Sandgipfel [3,389 m / 11,119 ft, right] and Glarner Tödi [3,571 m / 11,716 ft, left]), and the Zuetribistock ([2,644 m / 8,675 ft, right), as seen from the upper Linth Valley.

Highest point
- Peak: Hinderi Schibe
- Elevation: 3,083 m (10,115 ft)
- Prominence: 180 m (590 ft)
- Parent peak: Tödi
- Coordinates: 46°49′54.1″N 8°58′41.6″E

Naming
- Language of name: German

Geography
- Location within Switzerland Location within Canton of Glarus
- Country: Switzerland
- Canton: Glarus
- Parent range: Glarus Alps
- Topo map: Swiss Federal Office of Topography swisstopo

The Selbsanft is a large mountain massif in the Glarus Alps, overlooking the village of Linthal in the canton of Glarus, Switzerland. The mountain lies within the municipality of Glarus Süd.

The Selbsanft consists of several summits, of which the highest is named Hinderi Schibe. The massif is a buttress of the Bifertenstock and forms, along with the Schiben, the ridge that separates the valleys of the Sand (west) and Limmernsee (east). A small glacier lies east of the summit.

== Summits ==
The five main summits are, from north to south, the Vorder Selbsanft, also known as Hauserhorn (2,750 m [9,020 ft], there are higher summits between the Vorder Selbsanft and Mittler Selbsanft, though), Mitttler Selbsanft, also known in Grisons as Plattas Alvas (2,949 m [9,675 ft]), the Hinter Selbsanft (3,028 m [9,934 ft]), the highest peak of the Selbsanft triplet. In a broader sense, the Vorderi Schibe (2,987 m [9,800 ft]) and the Hinderi Schibe (3,083 m [10,115 ft]), the highest summit of this massif, are also part of the massif.

== See also ==
- List of mountains of the canton of Glarus
