= Volkswind =

Volkswind GmbH
- Company type: GmbH
- Founded: 1993
- Founder: Martin Daubner and Matthias Stommel
- Headquarters: Ganderkesee, Germany
- Products: Clean Energy; Wind Energy projects
- Number of employees: 45
- Parent: Axpo Holding
- Website: www.volkswind.com

Volkswind GmbH is one of the largest operators of wind farms in Germany. The company was founded in 1993 by Martin Daubner and Matthias Stommel, former Enercon employees. The company's headquarters is in Ganderkesee, Germany, and has worldwide subsidiaries in France, England, Poland, Bulgaria and the US.

The company develops, finances, builds and operates renewable energy wind power plants.

== History and milestones ==
1993

- Foundation of Volkswind as IPP
- Installation of the first windmill with capacity of 500 kW

1997

- Acquisition of Egeln castle (Saxony-Anhalt) as new headquarters

1998

- Development of world largest 4,5 MW wind mill (Enercon E 112 height:124m; rotor width: 112m)

2001

- More than 50 MW installed

2002

- Subsidiary in Paris, France
- More than 100 MW installed

2005

- Subsidiary in Goleniów, Poland
- Subsidiary in Manchester, UK
- Development of world highest wind mill from Vestas model V90 (125m)
- More than 200 MW installed

2006

- Development of largest wind farm in Cormainville, France at that time (30 Vestas V80-2MW wind turbines with combined nameplate capacity of 60 MW)
- More than 300 MW installed

2007

- New headquarter in Ganderkesee
- Subsidiary in Bulgaria with partner
- More than 400 MW installed

2008

- Subsidiary in Portland, Oregon, USA

== Gallery ==
Castle in Egeln

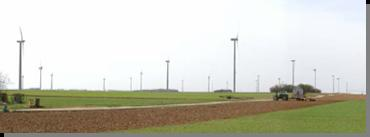
Cormainville, France

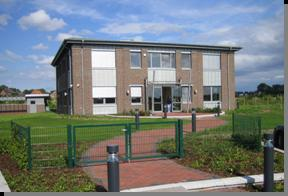
Headquarters: Ganderkesee, Germany
