= Beznau Nuclear Power Plant =

Nuclear power plant in Canton of Aargau, Switzerland

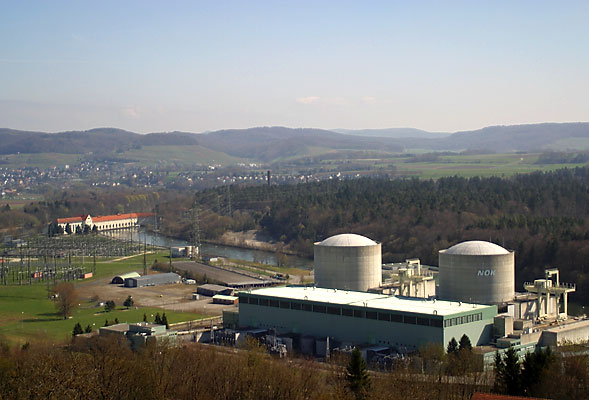
- Beznau Nuclear Power Plant
- Official name: Kernkraftwerk Beznau
- Country: Switzerland
- Location: Döttingen AG, Zurzach
- Coordinates: 47.552107°N 8.228492°E
- Status: Operational
- Construction began: 1965
- Commission date: 1 September 1969
- Owner: Axpo Holding
- Operator: Axpo Holding

Nuclear power station
- Reactor type: PWR
- Reactor supplier: Westinghouse Electric
- Cooling source: Aare
- Cogeneration?: Yes (150 GW·h_{t}/y)

Power generation
- Units operational: 2 × 365 MW
- Nameplate capacity: 730 MW
- Capacity factor: 91.8%
- Annual net output: 5,826 GW·h

External links
- Website: www.axpo.com/axpo/ch/en/axpo-erleben/kraftwerke/kernenergie.html
- Commons: Related media on Commons

Switzerland nuclear power plants (view)
Active plants
Closed plants

The Beznau nuclear power plant (German: Kernkraftwerk Beznau [KKB]) is a nuclear power plant of the Swiss energy utility Axpo, located in the municipality Döttingen, Canton of Aargau, Switzerland, on an artificial island in the Aare river. The plant has been operating since September 1969.

== History ==
=== Beznau 1 and 2 ===
Beznau 1 is the first commercial nuclear power reactor in Switzerland.

Putting an end to the traditional predilection of the Swiss power utilities for hydroelectric power, in the beginning of the 1960s the then Nordostschweizerische Kraftwerke AG (NOK, now part of Axpo Holding) started to take into account the construction of a nuclear power plant. On 23 December 1964 the Swiss Federal Office of Energy recognized the artificial island in Beznau as potential location for a reactor. The corresponding construction permit was issued on 2 November 1965 and, after only four years, on 12 May 1969 commissioning was authorized. On 24 December 1969 Beznau 1 started commercial operation.

In the meantime the procedure for the construction of the identical reactor Beznau 2 had begun. The location and a first construction permit were approved on 17 November 1967, followed on 21 September 1970 by the final one. The commissioning started on 16 July 1971 and the reactor finally entered the commercial operation phase on 15 March 1972.

Beznau 1 obtained an unlimited operating license already on 30 October 1970. On the contrary Beznau 2 operated under temporary licenses until 3 December 2004, when the Swiss Federal Council removed the limitation.

The power plant was built in the 1960s, when little opposition to nuclear projects was present. Over the years Beznau has been the scene of some anti-nuclear protests, but such opposition never widespread among the majority of the local population. The cantonal citizens systematically rejected all votes on early shutdown of existing plants and on building suspension of new ones. Finally, in 2007 the cantonal parliament entrusted the government to act in order to promote the building of a new reactor.

No date for a definitive shutdown of the KKB had been set. From a technical point of view, similar types of reactors can probably operate safely to at least 60 years and probably until 80 years. Beznau's Unit 1 is among the oldest commercial nuclear power plants still in operations as of 2024.

==== Greenpeace protest ====
At dawn on 5 March 2014, Greenpeace activists broke into Beznau, urging European governments to close down the reactors on safety grounds. Some 100 protesters dressed in orange jumpsuits climbed over the boundary fence and hoisted large banners with images of cracking reactors and announcing "The End" of nuclear power at the 45-year-old Beznau nuclear plant.

40 activists were arrested by cantonal police before noon and the others in the evening. 58 activists were reported to the Public Prosecutor for trespassing. The nuclear operator Axpo submitted a criminal complaint for trespassing.

==== 2015 Unit 1 shutdown ====
Newspaper Tages Anzeiger commented in October 2015 that two independent sources have confirmed that the reactor 1 pressure vessel contains around 1,000 cavities of half a centimetre in diameter. Similar cavities, although smaller in number, size and extension, were first discovered in the Belgian Doel 3 reactor, consequently the Swiss Federal Nuclear Safety Inspectorate (ENSI) asked Beznau and Gösgen NPPs to perform adequate testing on their reactor pressure vessel. It must be said that the flaw indications in the Belgian NPPs (Doel-3 and Tihange-2) did not cause the definitive shut down of the reactors. Indeed, both reactors resumed operations once all the needed tests were passed. Unit 1 was shut down upon the discovery of material defects.

==== 2018 Unit 1 restart ====
Unit 1 was expected to restart in 2016, but various delays pushed the restart to 2018 once Axpo had proved that the inclusions found in the reactor pressure vessel steel did not have a negative effect on safety.

==== Operational until... ====
In 2024 Axpo began assessing the technical feasibility of operating the Beznau nuclear power plant beyond the planned 60 years, beyond 2030. In December 2024, Axpo announced a CHF 350m investment to keep Beznau Unit 2 operational until 2032, and Unit 1 until 2033. According to Christoph Brand, head of the licensee Axpo Holding, the main problem is the lack of spare parts for the double turbine group of each unit, a unique construction of the Beznau plant.

=== Beznau 3 plans ===
In view of the substitution of the plant, Resun AG submitted a framework permit application for a third reactor to the federal authorities on 4 December 2008, designated "EKKB" (Ersatzkernkraftwerk Beznau, Beznau replacement nuclear power plant) or Beznau 3. Although the technical specifications are to be defined later, the reactor of choice is to be a light water type Generation III reactor with an electrical power of 1450 MW. The cooling is to be ensured by a hybrid tower.

The project is on indefinite hold following decisions by the Swiss federal authorities after the Fukushima Daiichi nuclear disaster in 2011 to cease constructing new nuclear power plants.

== Technical specifications ==
=== Reactors and generators ===
The KKB is composed of two identical pressurized water reactors units (Beznau 1 and 2) delivered by Westinghouse Electric.

Both reactors are certified for the use of MOX fuel. Since 2013, no more MOX fuel elements are used in both Beznau units.

Characterized by a thermal power of 1130 MW, each unit produces 365 MW net electricity through two Brown Boveri turbine generators. Over the years the net electric power produced has been increased twice: it was 350 MW until 30 September 1996 and 357 MW until 2 January 2000. The energy is delivered to the 220 kV grid.

The plant is cooled using the water of the Aar river and through the district heating system Refuna.

Unit	Type	Net electrical power	Gross electrical power	Construction start	Critical state	Connected to electricity grid	Commercial operation	Shutdown
Beznau 1	PWR	365 MW	380 MW	Sep. 1965	Jun. 1969	Jul. 1969	Dec. 1969	2033 (est)
Beznau 2	PWR	365 MW	380 MW	Jan. 1968	Oct. 1971	Oct. 1971	Mar. 1972	2032 (est)

=== Refuna nuclear district heating ===
The Beznau NPP has been supplying the district heating system Refuna since 1984. This reduces the effect of the plant on the water temperature of the Aar river, and provides eleven surrounding municipalities with up to 150 GW·h of carbon-free heat per year. Beside Döttingen, the connected municipalities are Bad Zurzach, Klingnau, Unterendingen, Endingen, Böttstein, Tegerfelden, and in the bordering Baden District, Würenlingen and Untersiggenthal, and in the other bordering Brugg District, Rüfenach and Villigen. The heat extraction, at a supply temperature from 125 °C in winter down to 80 °C in summer, induces a loss of electric power, but less than 18 GW·h_{e}/year at 2 MW_{e} average electric power loss. The energy content of the average 142 GW·h/y provided heat, is about the same as of 14,200,000 m^{3} of natural gas, averaging more than 5,800 m^{3} of natural gas consumption yearly saved for each of the 2,432 connected homes and customers.

=== Safety measures ===
Since the commissioning of the two reactors numerous upgrades have been carried out to improve safety. In the 1990s, the steam generators and the control technology of the reactor protection system were replaced. The control rooms were consequently adapted and new turbine controls installed.

Furthermore, each reactor unit has been equipped with an emergency building (NANO, NAchrüstung NOtstandsystem). These contain additional safety systems for the reactor emergency shutdown and for the feeding of the steam generators, a 50 kV emergency power line, and a diesel electricity generator. They are heavily protected (bunkerised) from external hazards and, if needed, are able to cool and shut down the power plant without human intervention for 72 hours. The at least 1.5 m thick concrete-steel housings protect the critical systems from external agents like earthquakes or plane crashes. Each unit of the KKB has a large dry type containment in steel and concrete.

The emergency core cooling (ECCS) per unit is performed by a redundant High-pressure safety injection system with a total of three lines (one in the NANO). The two steam generators are provided with water by two main feeding pumps. If they fail, feeding is taken over by one of the security systems: a double-lined auxiliary feedwater system or one of the two emergency feedwater systems, one of which part of the bunkerised NANO. Finally, in case of problems with the cooling, two Containment spray systems are entrusted with the removal of excessive heat and pressure by condensation of the resulting steam.

The power plant is connected through five strands to the external power grid. Two of them are mainly used to deliver the power plant output to the 220 kV grid. They are nevertheless equipped with an emergency diesel generator each per unit. Two other strands provide emergency power and are connected to the nearby hydroelectric power plant and the 50 kV grid. Further, two diesel generators per unit expressly equipped to be able to work in case of Accident management are also available. The NANO is connected through the fifth strand to the 50 kV grid and contains a fifth generator. The plant main UPS system can provide direct current for at least 4 h of normal operation.

=== Waste management ===
The KKB operates, since 1993, a separate interim radioactive waste storage facility (ZWIBEZ). It is composed of a hall for low level operational waste and a second one for the dry storage of spent fuel. The waste needing conditioning is stored in the central interim storage facility (ZZL) in Würenlingen. These two deposits are to ensure the storage of the plant's waste until at least 2020.

== Safety events ==
The following is an overview of nuclear security incidents at Beznau graded on the International Nuclear Event Scale (INES), which ranges from 0 (least severe) to 7 (most severe). In the plant's history there has been one level 2 event and four level 1 events.

Year	INES level								Total
Year	0	1	2	3	4	5	6	7	Total
2020	2	–	–	–	–	–	–	–	2
2019	7	–	–	–	–	–	–	–	7
2018	4	–	–	–	–	–	–	–	4
2017	7	–	–	–	–	–	–	–	7
2016	6	–	–	–	–	–	–	–	6
2015	6	–	–	–	–	–	–	–	7
2014	10	–	–	–	–	–	–	–	10
2013	7	–	–	–	–	–	–	–	7
2012	13	1	–	–	–	–	–	–	14
2009	10	–	1	–	–	–	–	–	11
2008	4	–	–	–	–	–	–	–	4
2007	7	1	–	–	–	–	–	–	8
2006	2	–	–	–	–	–	–	–	2
2005	2	–	–	–	–	–	–	–	2
2004	2	–	–	–	–	–	–	–	2
2003	4	–	–	–	–	–	–	–	4
2002	2	–	–	–	–	–	–	–	2
2001	5	–	–	–	–	–	–	–	5
2000	4	–	–	–	–	–	–	–	4
1999	5	–	–	–	–	–	–	–	5
1998	2	–	–	–	–	–	–	–	2
1997	6	1	–	–	–	–	–	–	7
1996	3	1	–	–	–	–	–	–	4
1995	3	–	–	–	–	–	–	–	3
Total	123	4	1	–	–	–	–	–	128
Sources: 2020 2019 2018 2017 2016 2015 2014 · 2013 · 2012 · others

=== Level 2 events ===
==== 2009 ====
- On 31 July 2009, during the yearly revision of Beznau 2, two workers were exposed to excessive levels of radiation because of a series of organizational flaws and uncoordinated handling by another revision team. These lead to a sudden increase in radiation levels in the room where the two technicians were working. They absorbed an equivalent dose of 37.8 and 25.4 mSv, respectively (see examples for radiation doses). Incorrect settings of personal dosimeters prevented a timely warning.

=== Level 1 events ===
==== 2012 ====
- An emergency diesel generator of unit 2 failed to start during a regular function test of this emergency electrical power generator.

==== 2007 ====
- In August, during the annual shutdown for revisions of Beznau 2, the 50 kV emergency power line was inactivated. Consequently, the diesel generator of Beznau 1 was switched on at low regime as prescribed by the security regulations. After the reconnection of the 50 kV line, the generator ran at a higher load because of technical reasons, but it eventually failed due to a defective relay. It was therefore assumed that while the 50 kV line was not active the generator would not have been able to run at full loading. Since the unit 2 generator was also unavailable due to the planned audit, the emergency power could be provided only by the hydroelectric plant or backup generators activated in case of flooding. The decrease in redundancy caused a deviation from the normal operation parameters and was therefore classified as a level 1 event (Swiss scale level B).

==== 1997 ====
- In the course of a periodic inspection carried out by the operating personnel, a manually operated valve, which should have been open, was found to be closed. As a result of the false position, one of three emergency cooling systems of Beznau 1 was not ready for immediate use over a period of two weeks. This breach of the technical specifications led to the incident being assessed as level 1 (Swiss scale level B).

==== 1996 ====
- After the revision outage, at 1 to 2% of reactor power, the new protection system for Beznau 1 and its internal power supply was to be started up with a test program. During synchronization with the new protection equipment, one of the two turbo groups inadvertently increased the load, and this caused a rise in reactor power to 12.6%. Since only the auxiliary feedwater pumps are in operation during low power, the amount of water supplied was insufficient to feed the steam generator, leading to an automatic reactor scram. The inadvertent demand on the turbo group was caused by an unforeseen reaction of the automatic turbine controller. Besides, the reactor already went critical at 251 °C instead of at the prescribed minimum temperature of 276 °C. The deviation from the operation specifications led to a level 1 assessment (Swiss scale level B).

=== Significant events before 1995 ===
- In July 1992, during a revision of Beznau 1, two technicians working in the reactor sump died by suffocation. This was caused by an excessive atmospheric concentration of the argon used for welding. This accident was not due to the nuclear nature of the plant and therefore didn't receive an INES assessment.

== See also ==
- Nuclear power in Switzerland
- Resun AG
