= Cormainville =

- Commune
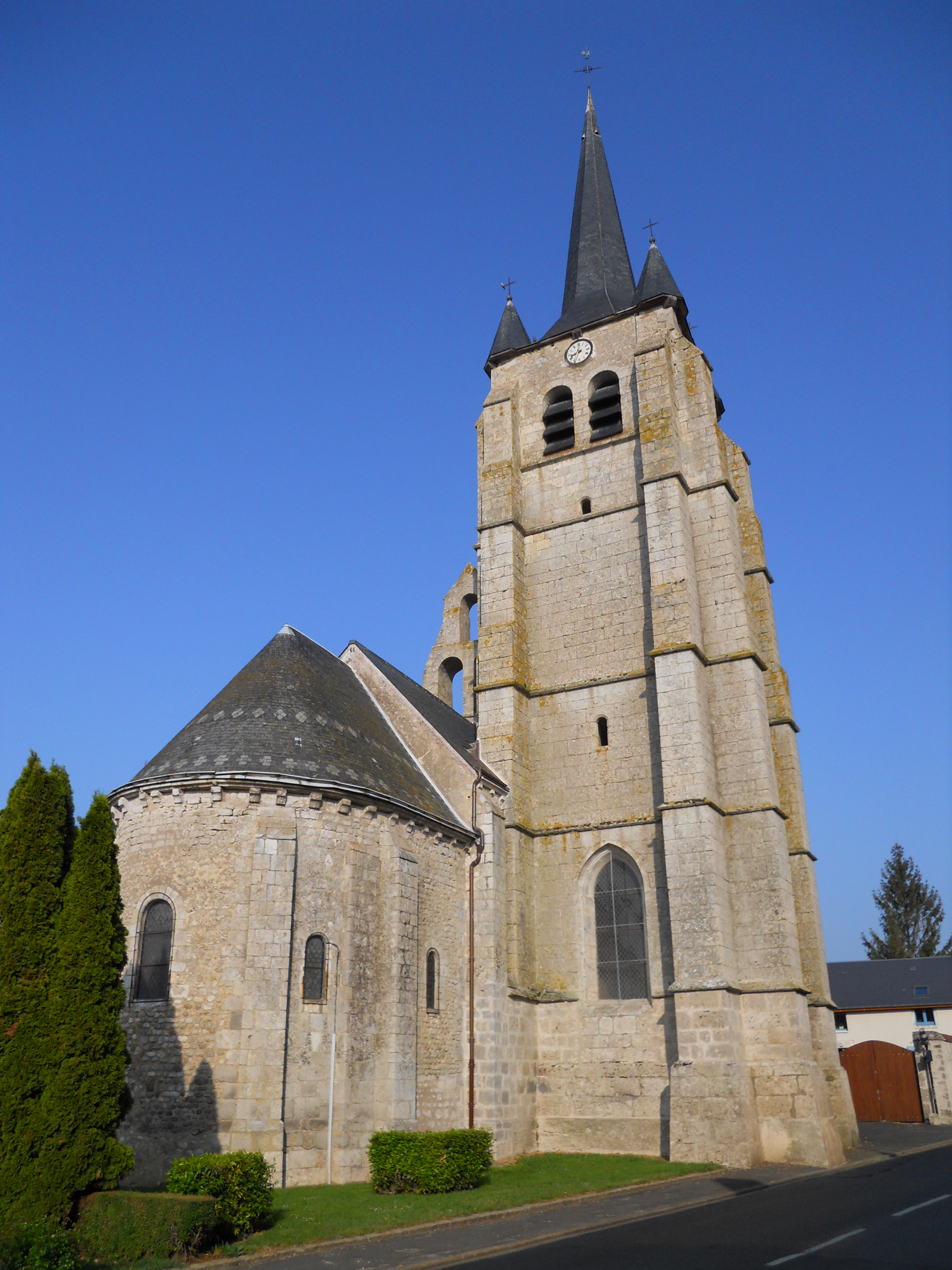
- The church in Cormainville
- Location of Cormainville
- Location within France Location within Centre-Val de Loire
- Coordinates: 48°08′17″N 1°36′28″E
- Country: France
- Region: Centre-Val de Loire
- Department: Eure-et-Loir
- Arrondissement: Châteaudun
- Canton: Les Villages Vovéens

Government
  - Mayor (2020–2026): Jean-Luc Legrand
- Area^{1}: 17.83 km^{2} (6.88 sq mi)
- Elevation: 139 m (456 ft)
- Highest elevation: 138 m (453 ft)
- Lowest elevation: 113 m (371 ft)
- Population (2023): 213
  - Density: 11.9/km^{2} (30.9/sq mi)
- Time zone: UTC+01:00 (CET)
  - Summer (DST): UTC+02:00 (CEST)
- INSEE/Postal code: 28108 /28140
- ^{1} French Land Register data, which excludes lakes, ponds, glaciers > 1 km^{2} (0.386 sq mi or 247 acres) and river estuaries.

Cormainville (French pronunciation: [kɔʁmɛ̃vil]) is a commune in the Eure-et-Loir department of northern France.

== Population ==
Historical population
Year	Pop.	±% p.a.
1968	312	—
1975	290	−1.04%
1982	219	−3.93%
1990	185	−2.09%
1999	192	+0.41%
2007	223	+1.89%
2012	242	+1.65%
2017	237	−0.42%
2023	213	−1.76%
Source: INSEE

== Economy ==
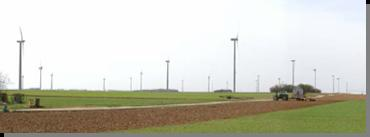
Cormainville windfarm

In 2006, the largest wind farm, at that time, was installed by the Volkswind company. It consists of 30 Vestas V80-2MW wind turbines with a combined nameplate capacity of 60 MW.

== See also ==
- Communes of the Eure-et-Loir department
