= Linth–Limmern Power Stations =

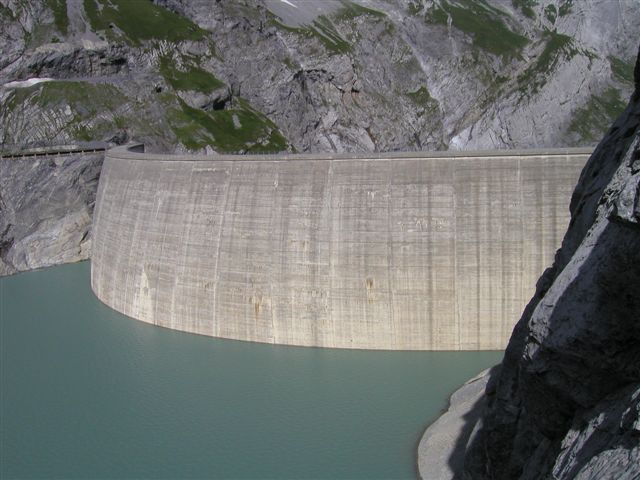
- Upstream face of the Limmern Dam
- Interactive map of Linth–Limmern Power Stations
- Country: Switzerland
- Location: Linthal, Glarus Süd
- Coordinates: 46°51′00″N 9°0′03″E
- Status: Operational
- Construction began: 1957
- Opening date: Tierfehd, Linthal: 1964; Mutt: 1965; Tierfehd PS: 2009; Limmern PS: 2017
- Owner: Linth-Limmern AG

Upper reservoir
- Creates: Mutt/Limmern

Lower reservoir
- Creates: Limmern/Tierfehd

Power Station
- Hydraulic head: Limmern PS: 623 m (2,044 ft); Tierfehd: 1,045 m (3,428 ft); Linthal: 130 m (427 ft)
- Turbines: Mutt: 4.4 MW Pelton turbine Limmern: 4 x 250 MW variable-speed Francis pump-turbines Tierfehd: 3 x 87 MW Pelton turbines; 2 x 20 MW Pelton turbines; 1 x 140 MW Francis pump-turbine Linthal: 2 x 17.2 MW Pelton turbines
- Installed capacity: Mutt: 4.4 MW; Limmern: 1,000 MW; Tierfehd: 441 MW; Linthal: 34.4 MW
- Annual generation: Mutt: 7 million kWh; Tierfehd: 345 million kWh; Linthal: 76 million kWh; Total: 428 million kWh

The Linth–Limmern Power Stations are a system of hydroelectric power stations located south of Linthal in the canton of Glarus, Switzerland. The system uses five reservoirs and four power stations at steep variations in altitude.

Works on the complex began in 1957 with the construction of Lake Limmern Dam and the Mutt, Tierfehd and Linthal Power Stations. The dam was completed in 1963 and the power stations were all operational by 1968, with an installed capacity of 340 MW. In 2009, a 140 MW pumped-storage component between Lake Limmern and Tierfehd Reservoir was commissioned. In 2010, construction began on the Linthal 2015 Project, which included the expansion of Lake Mutt and Tierfehd Reservoir, and the addition of the Limmern Power Station, a 1,000 MW pumped-storage component between Lake Mutt and Lake Limmern. Commissioning of the last unit in Limmern was completed by December 2017, bringing the total installed capacity of the system to 1480 MW.

== Design and operation ==
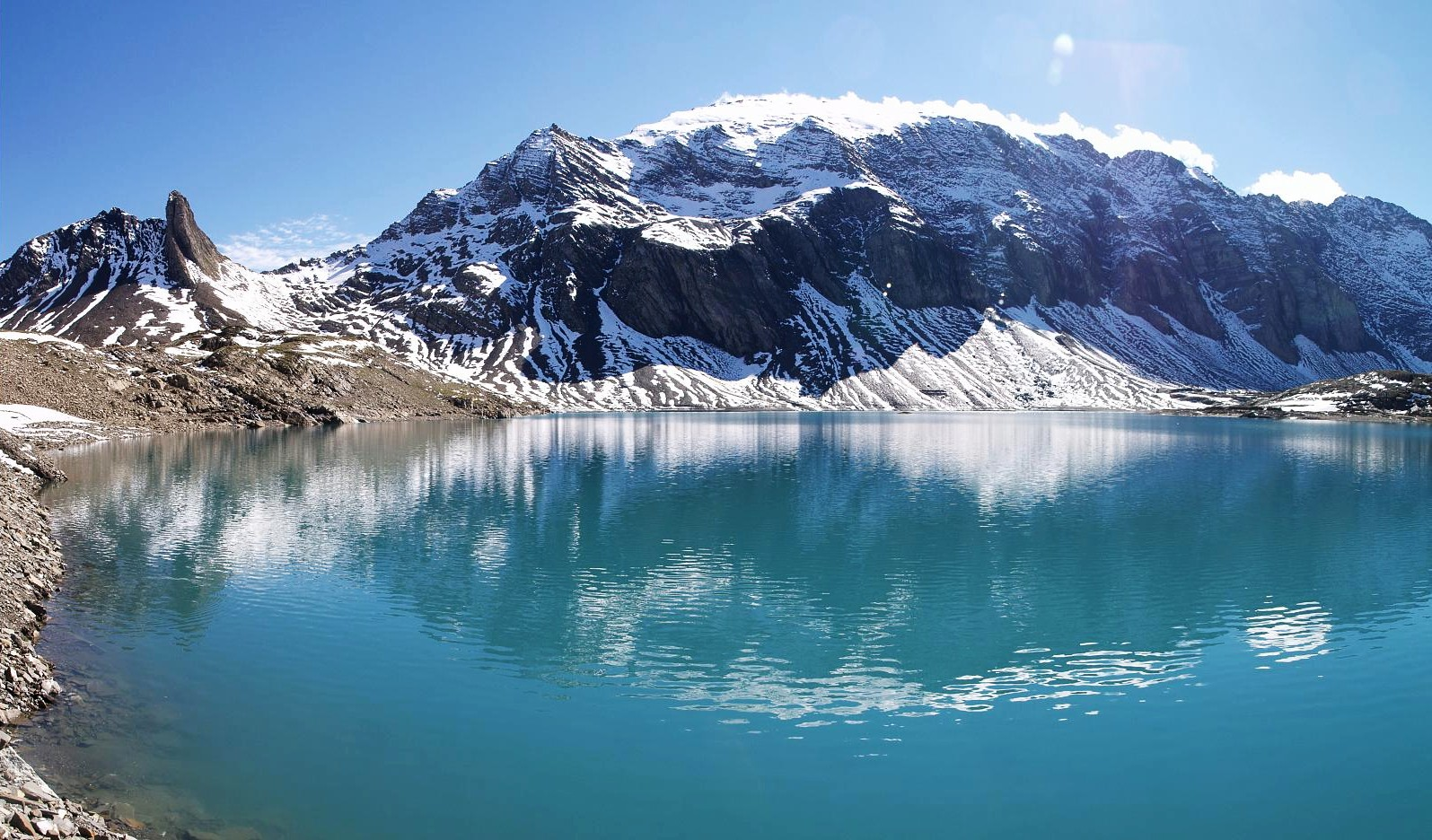
Lake Mutt in 2006.

The highest reservoir in the complex is Lake Mutt (Muttsee), situated at 2,474 m (8,117 ft) above sea level. It had an original storage capacity of 9,000,000 m^{3} (7,300 acre⋅ft), and was later expanded to 25,000,000 m^{3} (20,000 acre⋅ft) during the Linthal 2015 expansion, to hold extra capacity for the new pumped-storage power station. A 2.2 MW solar farm was added to the Muttsee dam in 2021, supplying 3.3 GWh per year.

Below Lake Mutt, the main reservoir in the complex is Lake Limmern (Limmernsee), which was created by a 146 m (479 ft) tall and 375 m (1,230 ft) long arch dam on the Limmern Creek. At an elevation of 1,857 m (6,093 ft) above sea level, it can store up to 92,000,000 m^{3} (75,000 acre⋅ft) of water.

At an elevation of 1,298 m (4,259 ft) above sea level in an adjacent valley, the Hintersand Balancing Reservoir has a storage capacity of 110,000 m^{3} (89 acre⋅ft).

The middle reservoir in the complex is the Tierfehd Balancing Reservoir, located at an altitude of 811 m (2,661 ft) above sea level. It was built in 1964 with an original storage capacity of 210,000 m^{3} (170 acre⋅ft), but was later expanded to 560,000 m^{3} (450 acre⋅ft) during the Linthal 2015 expansion project.

Finally, the Linthal Balancing Reservoir is located down in the valley at an elevation of 676 m (2,218 ft) above sea level, and withholds 210,000 m^{3} (170 acre⋅ft) of water. It has a direct discharge into the Linth river.

Between Lake Mutt and Lake Limmern are the Mutt Power Station, in service since 1965 containing a single 4.4 MW Pelton turbine, and the latest expansion to the complex, the Limmern Power Station, which completed commissioning in late 2017 and has four 250 MW Francis pump-turbine. These four reversible pump-turbines are of slip energy recovery variable-speed type. During periods of low demand, water can be pumped from Lake Limmern to Lake Mutt and when energy demand is high, the water is released down for generation. The same turbines that pump the water to Lake Mutt reverse into generator mode. The difference in elevation between the two lakes affords a net hydraulic head of 623 m (2,044 ft).

Lake Limmern also provides water to the Tierfehd Power Station further down in the valley for conventional hydroelectric generation and pumped-storage. This power station includes three 87 MW Pelton turbines, in service since 1964, and one 140 MW Francis reversible pump-turbine, that was added to the complex in 2009. Additionally, the Hintersand Balancing Reservoir provides water to two 20 MW Pelton turbines also within the Tierfehd Power Station. Also in this Power Station, a 34 MW electrically driven pump allows the transfer of water from Hintersand Reservoir up to Lake Limmern.

Water used for power generation at Tierfehd is discharged into the Tierfehd Balancing Reservoir. The water in this reservoir can either be pumped back up to Lake Limmern or directed down to the Linthal Power Station, which has two 17.2 MW Pelton turbines. From there, the Linthal Power Station discharges the water into the Linthal Balancing Reservoir and into the Linth river.

Standseilbahn Linth-Limmern is a funicular from Tierfehd to the Limmern Power Station.

== See also ==
- List of pumped-storage hydroelectric power stations
- List of tallest dams in Switzerland
- List of power stations in Switzerland
