= Solar power in Switzerland =

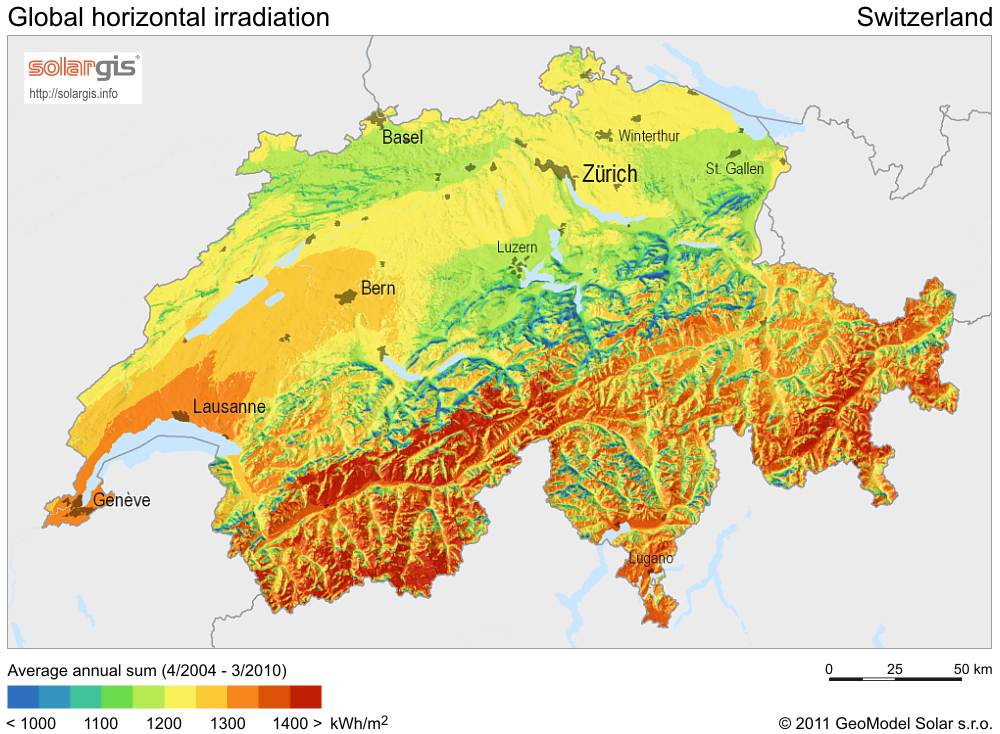
- Solar irradiation map of Switzerland
- Installed capacity: 7.79 GW (2024) (23rd)
- Annual generation: 5.89 TWh (2024)
- Capacity per capita: 879 W (2024)
- Share of electricity: 7.5 (2024)

Solar power in Switzerland has demonstrated consistent capacity growth since the early 2010s, influenced by government subsidy mechanisms such as the implementation of the feed-in tariff in 2009 and the enactment of the revised Energy Act in 2018. In 2025, solar power contributes nearly to 8 TWh of generation to the Swiss grid with the share of share of solar power in electricity generation covering 13.7.5% of total electric power generation. Switzerland has 9.5 GW of installed capacity, a notable increase from the 0.1 GW recorded in 2010.

In 2024, the Swiss Solar Energy Association said solar power could be covering 50% of Switzerland's annual electricity consumption in 2050 if current market and installation trends continue.

In 2022, Switzerland's federal parliament revised the Energy Act to streamline the authorization process for new solar installations, aligning with the nation's transition to sustainable energy as it phases out nuclear power.

On February 1, 2023, Switzerland held its first auction for one-off payments for large photovoltaic (PV) systems. 94 applicants received payments ranging from CHF 360 to CHF 640 per kilowatt (kW), supporting a total capacity of 35 MW.

== Solar production ==
In 2021, Switzerland's photovoltaic (PV) installations increased to 685 MWp from 475 MWp in 2020. The Federal Energy Act, revised and effective from January 1, 2018, changed the support scheme for PV systems: it extended the one-time investment subsidy to all sizes of PV systems, ranging from 2 kW to 50 MW. Additionally, in 2022, the investment subsidy formula was updated to encourage investments in larger PV capacities and more efficient use of rooftop space.

The AlpinSolar project, comprising nearly 5000 solar panels on Switzerland's Lake Muttsee dam, harnesses high-altitude sunlight and snow cover to maximize energy production, particularly in winter. Completed in 2022, the installation has already commenced production at the site. Managed by Axpo, it generates about 3.3 million kilowatt hours annually, sufficient for 700 households. Switzerland's federal parliament amended the Energy Act in 2022 to expedite the approval process for new solar plants, reflecting a shift toward sustainable energy amid the country's nuclear phase-out.

In a February 2023 press release, researchers from ETH Zurich and the University of Bern highlighted findings from a study on the economic viability of solar panel installations across 2,067 Swiss cities and communes. The study found that solar installations offer financial viability for slightly less than half of the single-family homes with gas heating, contingent on achieving a profitability threshold exceeding three percent over a 30-year period. The analysis took into consideration several key factors, including installation and maintenance costs, system performance, the tax rate, and the compensation rates for energy fed back into the grid.

In Switzerland, the price paid for solar energy added to the grid varies widely, ranging from less than 4 cents to as high as 21.75 cents per kWh in 2022 in one canton alone.

== Opposition ==
In 2022, Switzerland derived 6% of its electricity from solar power. Studies show that installing solar panels on mountaintops in the Swiss Alps could produce at least 16 terawatt-hours (TWh) a year, approaching half of the nation's 2050 solar energy target. Typically, solar panels in Switzerland are mounted on existing infrastructure like mountain huts, ski lifts, and dams, with larger-scale installations in the Alps remaining rare.

On September 10, 2023, 54% of Valais voters rejected Alpine solar project proposals due to environmental and aesthetic concerns. This decision, opposed by the Swiss People's Party and environmental groups, suggests a preference for solar development in urban areas. Valais, known as one of Switzerland's sunniest regions suitable for solar parks, witnessed a significant vote that impacts the direction of renewable energy projects within the canton.

== Feed-in tariffs 2009 (KEV) ==
Swiss electricity by source

- Hydro riv.: 17,000 GWh (26.6%)
- Hydro dam: 22,600 GWh (35.3%)
- Solar PV: 2,850 GWh (4.5%)
- Wood: 675 GWh (1.1%)
- Wind: 145 GWh (0.2%)
- Waste incin.: 2,180 GWh (3.4%)
- Nuclear: 18,500 GWh (28.9%)
Electricity sector in Switzerland, in 2021. Mostly carbon free with hydro (62%) and nuclear (29%).

The feed-in remuneration at cost (KEV, German: Kostendeckende Einspeisevergütung) is a Swiss subsidy mechanism designed to support the production of electricity from renewable energy sources. Since January 1, 2009, producers of electricity from wind, small hydropower, biomass, photovoltaics (PV), or geothermal energy have been remunerated with a guaranteed tariff for the electricity they feed into the grid. This compensation is provided as long as they are not on an extensive waiting list due to capacity constraints.

Initially, the tariff system for solar PV installations in Switzerland differentiated between rooftop, open-space, and building-integrated setups, with capacity-based rates. These rates were adjusted periodically to match solar PV pricing fluctuations. In 2014, a significant amendment introduced a one-time investment grant for small-scale rooftop installations, removing feed-in tariffs for installations below 10 kW. Owners of installations between 10 kW and 30 kW had the option to choose between the feed-in tariff and the investment grant. Subsequent modifications in 2015 standardized tariff rates for both rooftop and open-space installations.

As of February 2024, the Swiss Federal Office of Energy announced that feed-in remuneration at cost (KEV) subsidies, introduced in 2009 to promote electricity generation from renewable energies, are no longer available for new installations.

== Energy Act 2017 ==
In Switzerland, the "Energy Strategy 2050" and a revised Federal Energy Act in 2017 have led to changes in the photovoltaic (PV) sector. Since January 1, 2018, adjustments include extending the one-time investment subsidy to all PV systems (2 kW to 50 MW) and gradually replacing the feed-in tariff scheme (KEV) with a market-aligned remuneration system. Systems below 100 kW receive only the one-time subsidy, and only PV projects announced before June 30, 2012, benefit from the original feed-in tariff. A new measure enables different end consumers to connect and act as a single consumer towards the local energy supplier, fostering collective self-consumption based on physical grid infrastructure. This initiative was updated in 2019 to enhance flexibility and attractiveness for investors.

== PV capacity ==
Installed PV capacity (in MW)
Year End	Total capacity	Yearly installation
1992	4.7	n.a.
1993	5.8	1
1994	6.7	1
1995	7.5	1
1996	8.4	1
1997	9.7	1
1998	12	2
1999	13	1
2000	15	2
2001	18	2
2002	20	2
2003	21	2
2004	23	2
2005	27	4
2006	30	3
2007	36	6
2008	48	12
2009	74	26
2010	110	37
2011	211	100
2012	437	226
2013	756	319
2014	1,076	320
2015	1,394	318
2016	1,664	270
2017	1,906	242
2018	2,171	265
2019	2,498	327
2020	2,973	475
2021	3,655	682
2022	4,738	1,083
2023	6,379	1,641
2024	8,150	1,771
Source: IEA-PVPS, Bundesamt für Energie, 2019, 2020, 2021 2022, 2023, 2024

Yearly installation – Annually installed PV capacity in MW since 2009
Total capacity – Cumulative installed PV capacity in MW since 2009

European PV growth in watts per capita 1992–2014: <0.1, n/a 0.1-1 1-10 / 10-50 50-100 100-150 / 150-200 200-300 300-450

Number of countries with PV capacities in the gigawatt-scale
Growing number of solar gigawatt-markets
Countries above the 1-GW mark
- 2014	(Thailand)	(Netherlands)	(Switzerland)
  2013	(Canada)	(Romania)
  2012	(Bulgaria)	(Greece)	(India)	(United Kingdom)
  2011	(Australia)	(China)
  2010	(Belgium)	(Czech Republic)	(France)
  2009	(Italy)
  2008	(Spain)	(United States)
  2004	(Japan)	(Germany)
Countries above the 10-GW mark
- 2013	(United States)	(Japan)
  2011	(Italy)
  2010	(Germany)

== See also ==
- Energy in Switzerland
