= Schibe (mountain, Glarus) =

Mountain in Switzerland

- Location within Switzerland Location within Canton of Glarus

Highest point
- Peak: Hinderi Schibe
- Elevation: 3,083 m (10,115 ft)
- Prominence: 124 m (407 ft)
- Parent peak: Tödi
- Coordinates: 46°49′07″N 8°58′18″E

Naming
- Language of name: Swiss German

Geography
- Country: Switzerland
- Canton: Glarus
- Parent range: Glarus Alps
- Topo map: Swiss Federal Office of Topography swisstopo

The Schibe is a mountain of the Glarus Alps, located south of Linthal in the canton of Glarus. It lies north of the Bifertenstock, on the range separating the Sand valley from the Limmeren valley that also includes the Selbsanft.

The mountain is composed of two summits: the Hinderi Schibe at an elevation of 3,083 m (10,115 ft) and the Vorderi Schibe at an elevation of 2,987 m (9,800 ft). The mountain lies within the municipality of Glarus Süd. In a broader sense, they are part of the Selbsanft massif.

== See also ==
- List of mountains of the canton of Glarus
