= Muttsee =

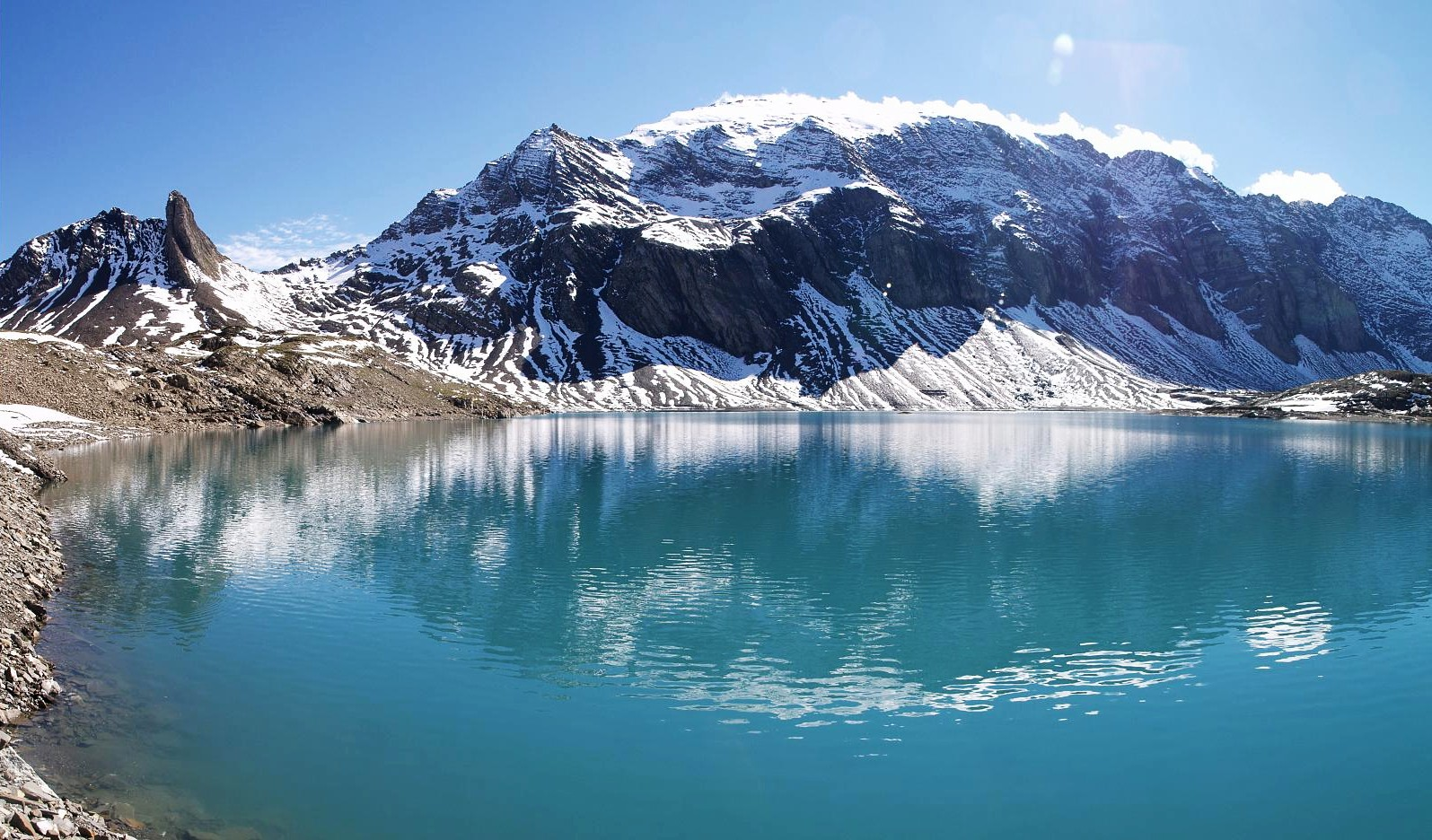

- Location within Canton of Glarus Location within Canton of Graubünden Location within Switzerland Location within Alps
- Interactive map of Muttsee
- Location: Linthal, Glarus
- Coordinates: 46°51′49″N 9°1′38″E
- Type: natural, reservoir
- Primary outflows: Limmernsee
- Basin countries: Switzerland
- Surface area: 42 ha (100 acres)
- Water volume: 0.025 km^{3} (0.0060 cu mi)
- Surface elevation: 2,446 m (8,025 ft)

Muttsee is a reservoir in the Canton of Glarus, Switzerland, with a surface area of 42 ha (100 acres). It is used as the upper reservoir in the 1 GW pumped-storage hydroelectricity Linth–Limmern Power Stations.

The 2.4 km high altitude permits a 2.2 MW solar farm to supply 3.3 GWh per year, more than average power, even in winter (as the high altitude prevents fog formation, and as the snow reflects the sunlight onto the solar panels). The 6,000 photovoltaic panels were installed on the containment wall of the artificial basin in 2021, covering approximately 10,000 square meters of concrete, and stretching over almost 1 km.

== See also ==
- List of lakes of Switzerland
- List of mountain lakes of Switzerland
