= Böttstein =

- Municipality
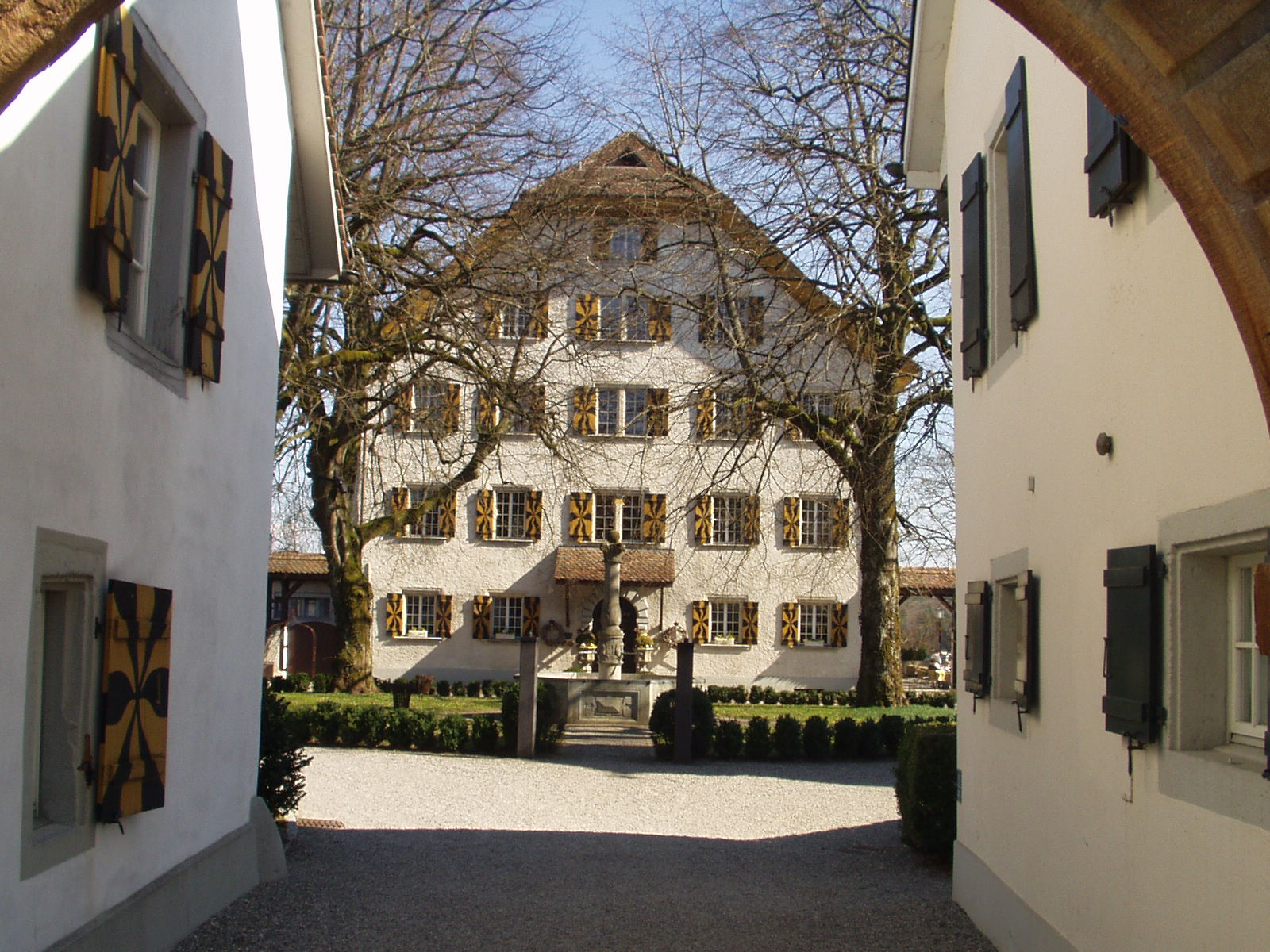

- Flag Coat of arms
- Location of Böttstein
- Location within Switzerland Location within Canton of Aargau
- Coordinates: 47°34′N 8°14′E
- Country: Switzerland
- Canton: Aargau
- District: Zurzach

Government
  - Mayor: Agnes Canonica

Area
  - Total: 7.41 km^{2} (2.86 sq mi)
- Elevation: 356 m (1,168 ft)

Population (December 2020)
  - Total: 3,982
  - Density: 537/km^{2} (1,390/sq mi)
- Time zone: UTC+01:00 (CET)
  - Summer (DST): UTC+02:00 (CEST)
- Postal codes: 5315 (Böttstein); 5314 (Kleindöttingen)
- SFOS number: 4303
- ISO 3166 code: CH-AG
- Surrounded by: Döttingen, Klingnau, Leuggern, Mandach, Villigen, Würenlingen
- Website: www.boettstein.ch

Böttstein is a municipality in the district of Zurzach in the canton of Aargau in Switzerland.

== History ==
Some scattered La Tène culture items have been discovered near Böttstein. The modern village of Böttstein is first mentioned in 1087 as Botistein. During the 11th to 13th Centuries it was the seat of the lords of Böttstein, who ruled over the village. The other, neighboring villages were under the lower court of the Knights Hospitaller order house at Leuggern. After the conquest of the Aargau in 1415, the Herrschaft was held by the district of Leuggern in the County of Baden. The ownership of the administrative rights of the village wend through about ten changes until 1606 when it was bought by the von Roll family of Uri. Between 1615-17, they replaced the original castle with a late-Gothic - early Baroque mansion with chapel. Through marriage, the property came in 1674 to the Schmid family of Bellikon, who ruled over the village until 1798 and occupied the castle until 1893. The chapel of St. Anthony was given a wide range of ornamentation in the manner of Italian baroque churches with excellent stucco work, all done by northern Italian masters. In 1816 the municipality was formed by dividing the large municipality of Leuggern.

Aerial view from 600 m by Walter Mittelholzer (1920)

Böttstein and the other villages were part of the parish of Leuggern.

Until the late 19th Century the major economic activities were farming, viticulture and handicrafts. During the late 19th Century, the timber industry grew along the Aare river, which provided many new jobs. The new jobs along the river allowed the small village of Kleindöttingen to expand rapidly. Despite its own industry (1970-94 particle board factory, furniture factories) and numerous commercial enterprises the municipality is primarily a commuter town.

== Geography ==
Böttstein has an area, as of 2009, of 7.41 square kilometers (2.86 sq mi). Of this area, 2.52 km^{2} (0.97 sq mi) or 34.0% is used for agricultural purposes, while 2.6 km^{2} (1.0 sq mi) or 35.1% is forested. Of the rest of the land, 1.54 km^{2} (0.59 sq mi) or 20.8% is settled (buildings or roads), 0.68 km^{2} (0.26 sq mi) or 9.2% is either rivers or lakes and 0.11 km^{2} (27 acres) or 1.5% is unproductive land.

Of the built up area, industrial buildings made up 3.6% of the total area while housing and buildings made up 8.9% and transportation infrastructure made up 4.0%. Power and water infrastructure as well as other special developed areas made up 3.1% of the area while parks, green belts and sports fields made up 1.1%. Out of the forested land, 32.8% of the total land area is heavily forested and 2.3% is covered with orchards or small clusters of trees. Of the agricultural land, 22.0% is used for growing crops and 9.9% is pastures, while 2.2% is used for orchards or vine crops. Of the water in the municipality, 3.6% is in lakes and 5.5% is in rivers and streams.

The municipality is located in the Zurzach district, on the left bank of the Aare river a few kilometers from its confluence. It consists of the villages of Böttstein and Kleindöttingen and the hamlets of Eien and Burlen.

== Coat of arms ==
The blazon of the municipal coat of arms is Or Frete Gules and is based on the coat of arms of the Counts of Böttstein.

== Demographics ==
Böttstein has a population (as of December 2020) of 3,982. As of June 2009, 39.2% of the population are foreign nationals. Over the last 10 years (1997–2007) the population has changed at a rate of 1.1%. Most of the population (as of 2000) speaks German (80.3%), with Italian being second most common ( 6.3%) and Albanian being third ( 4.3%).

The age distribution, as of 2008, in Böttstein is; 368 children or 9.8% of the population are between 0 and 9 years old and 502 teenagers or 13.3% are between 10 and 19. Of the adult population, 500 people or 13.3% of the population are between 20 and 29 years old. 437 people or 11.6% are between 30 and 39, 614 people or 16.3% are between 40 and 49, and 573 people or 15.2% are between 50 and 59. The senior population distribution is 405 people or 10.8% of the population are between 60 and 69 years old, 262 people or 7.0% are between 70 and 79, there are 91 people or 2.4% who are between 80 and 89, and there are 12 people or 0.3% who are 90 and older.

As of 2000 the average number of residents per living room was 0.63 which is more people per room than the cantonal average of 0.57 per room. In this case, a room is defined as space of a housing unit of at least 4 m^{2} (43 sq ft) as normal bedrooms, dining rooms, living rooms, kitchens and habitable cellars and attics. About 52.2% of the total households were owner occupied, or in other words did not pay rent (though they may have a mortgage or a rent-to-own agreement).

As of 2000, there were 132 homes with 1 or 2 persons in the household, 762 homes with 3 or 4 persons in the household, and 471 homes with 5 or more persons in the household. As of 2000, there were 1,392 private households (homes and apartments) in the municipality, and an average of 2.6 persons per household. In 2008 there were 433 single family homes (or 27.6% of the total) out of a total of 1,567 homes and apartments. There were a total of 4 empty apartments for a 0.3% vacancy rate. As of 2007, the construction rate of new housing units was 0 new units per 1000 residents.

In the 2007 federal election the most popular party was the SVP which received 49.84% of the vote. The next three most popular parties were the CVP (20.11%), the FDP (10.67%) and the SP (10.47%). In the federal election, a total of 962 votes were cast, and the voter turnout was 48.7%.

Population

The historical population is given in the following table:

year	population
1799	Böttstein 168 Kleindöttingen 96; Eien 60
1850	together 629
1888	536
1900	760
1950	1,051
2000	3,648

== Heritage sites of national significance ==
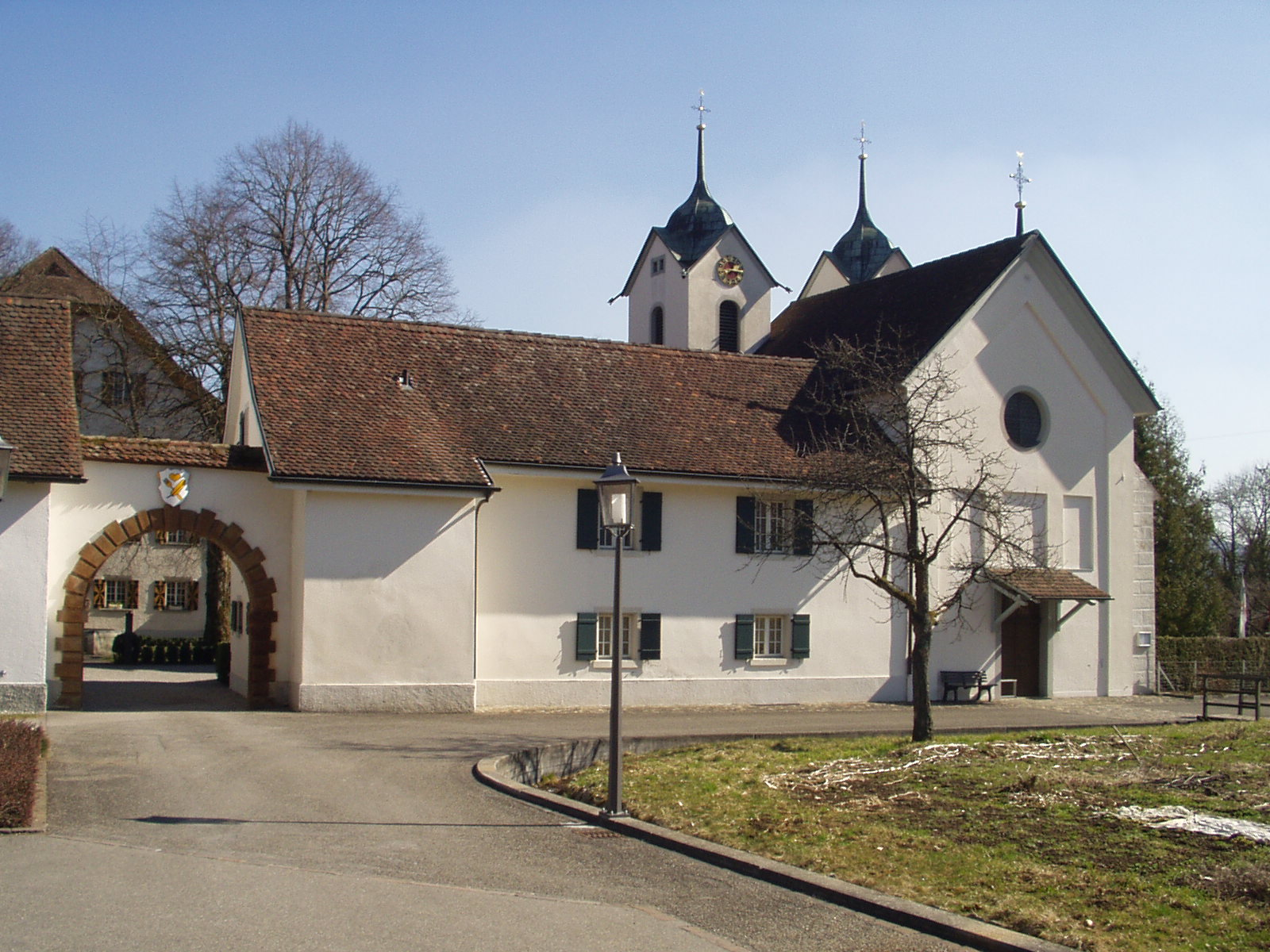
Schloss Böttstein with the chapel tower visible

The oil press and sawmill at Schlossweg 2 and the castle chapel are listed as Swiss heritage sites of national significance. The entire village of Böttstein is designated as part of the Inventory of Swiss Heritage Sites.

== Economy ==
As of 2012, there were a total of 1,671 people employed in the municipality. Of these, a total of 52 people worked in 14 businesses in the primary economic sector. The secondary sector employed 743 workers in 51 separate businesses. Finally, the tertiary sector provided 876 jobs in 134 businesses. In 2013 a total of 0.5% of the population received social assistance.

In 2000 there were 1,827 workers who lived in the municipality. Of these, 1,402 or about 76.7% of the residents worked outside Böttstein while 722 people commuted into the municipality for work. There were a total of 1,147 jobs (of at least 6 hours per week) in the municipality. Of the working population, 15.4% used public transportation to get to work, and 55.3% used a private car.

== Politics ==
In the 2011 federal election the most popular party was the SVP with 52.3% of the vote. The next three most popular parties were the CVP (16.1%), the SP (11.0%) and the FDP (8.1%). In the federal election, a total of 958 votes were cast, and the voter turnout was 49.7%.

== Crime ==
In 2014 the crime rate, of the over 200 crimes listed in the Swiss Criminal Code (running from murder, robbery and assault to accepting bribes and election fraud), in Böttstein was 25.3 per thousand residents. This rate is only 50.1% of the cantonal rate and 39.2% of the average rate in the entire country. During the same period, the rate of drug crimes was 3.5 per thousand residents, only 35.4% of the national rate. The rate of violations of immigration, visa and work permit laws was 0 per thousand residents.

== Religion ==
From the 2000 census, 2,087 or 57.2% were Roman Catholic, while 661 or 18.1% belonged to the Swiss Reformed Church. Of the rest of the population, there were 7 individuals (or about 0.19% of the population) who belonged to the Christian Catholic faith.

== Education ==
In Böttstein about 62.2% of the population (between age 25-64) have completed either non-mandatory upper secondary education or additional higher education (either university or a Fachhochschule). Of the school age population (in the 2008/2009 school year), there are 261 students attending primary school, there are 202 students attending secondary school in the municipality.
