= Swissgrid =

Swiss transmission grid operator

Swissgrid AG
- Company type: Aktiengesellschaft
- Founded: January 2005; 21 years ago
- Headquarters: Aarau (Aargau), Switzerland
- Key people: Yves Zumwald (CEO); Adrian Bult (Chairman of the Board of Directors)
- Number of employees: 500 (01.04.2019)
- Website: www.swissgrid.ch

Swissgrid, based in Aarau and Prilly, is the Swiss transmission grid operator. It is subject to supervision by the Swiss Federal Electricity Commission ElCom.

== History ==
Swissgrid was established in January 2005 by Switzerland’s main electricity grid companies as part of the liberalisation of the electricity market. From 15 December 2006 Swissgrid coordinated Switzerland's transmission grid (380/220 kV), comprised up to that point of eight control areas. With the changeover on the night of 31 December 2008 to 1 January 2009 from eight control areas to one zone covering the whole of Switzerland, Swissgrid took over the operation of the entire 6,700-kilometre extra high-voltage grid.

When the transfer was entered in the commercial register on 3 January 2013, Swissgrid became the new owner of the Swiss transmission grid. Swiss transmission system operator Swissgrid has since been responsible not only for the operation of the transmission grid but also for its maintenance, renewal and expansion. The statutory requirement was thus met for the electricity companies to have completed the transfer of the transmission grid to Swissgrid by 1 January 2013 at the latest.

== Organisation ==
Swissgrid includes four corporate divisions: Grid Infrastructure, Market, Technology and Corporate Services. The members of the Executive Board are:

- Yves Zumwald, CEO
- Doris Barnert, Head of Corporate Services / CFO
- Maurice Dierick, Head of Market
- Adrian Häsler, Head of Grid Infrastructure
- Rainer Mühlberger, Head of Technology

The Electricity Supply Act requires that the majority of Members and the Chairman of the Board of Directors, as well as the Members of the Executive, do not belong to the boards of any legal entities which are engaged in activities in the fields of electricity generation or sales, or are in a service-provision relationship with any such legal entities. At present the Board of Directors is made up of five independents and four industry representatives. The Chairman of the Board of Directors is appointed from among the independents.

== Cooperative ventures ==
In the context of the European exchange of electricity, the company was a member of the European grid association, the "Union for the Coordination of Transmission of Electricity" (UCTE) and of the organisation of the European transmission grid operators (European Transmission System Operators, ETSO). These two associations have now been merged into the European Network of Transmission System Operators for Electricity (ENTSO-E), which was established in December 2008 in Prague and took up its operational role in the summer of 2009. Swissgrid is also a member of the TSO Security Cooperation (TSC) and since November 2010 it has been a shareholder of the Capacity Allocation Service Company (CASC).

== KPIs of the Swiss transmission grid ==
The Swiss transmission grid, 6,700 km (4,200 mi) in length, operates at voltages of 220 kilovolts and 380 kilovolts and a frequency of 50 Hz. It has 145 switching substations and 12,000 electricity pylons.

== Cost-covering remuneration for feed-in to the electricity grid (Pronovo) ==
In May 2017, the Swiss electorate adopted the Energy Act (Energiegesetz - EnG), which entered into force on 1 January 2018. Amongst other things, the Act stipulates that the collection of grid premiums, the CRF and one-off remuneration payments, and the issuing of guarantees of origin should be outsourced to an independent enforcement agency. Swissgrid has been directly responsible for these activities as an accredited certification body on behalf of the federal government since 2007.

Pronovo AG is a wholly owned subsidiary of Swissgrid and will operate under the authority of the Swiss Federal Office of Energy (SFOE). The headquarters of the subsidiary, which employs around 60 people, are located in Frick, Aargau. The newly created enforcement agency has begun its operations on 3 January 2018.
