= Limmernsee =

Limmernsee Limmerensee
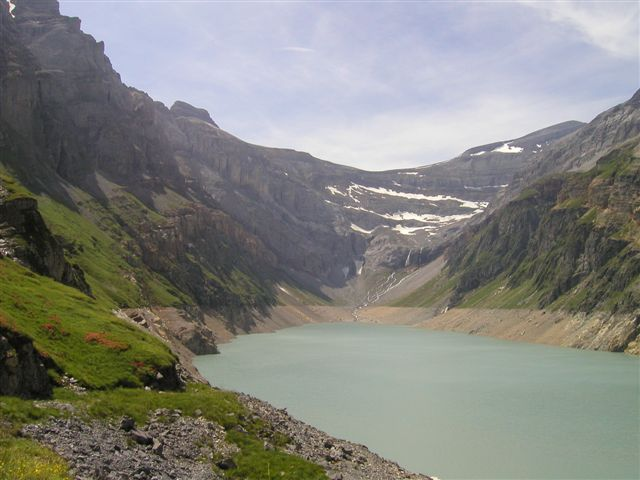

- Location within Canton of Glarus Location within Canton of Graubünden Location within Switzerland Location within Alps
- Interactive map of Limmernsee; Limmerensee
- Location: Glarus
- Coordinates: 46°50′8″N 9°0′51″E
- Type: reservoir
- Primary inflows: Muttenbach, canal from Muttsee, Limmern Glacier
- Primary outflows: Limmernbach
- Catchment area: 17.8 km^{2} (6.9 sq mi)
- Basin countries: Switzerland
- Max. length: 3 km (1.9 mi)
- Surface area: 1.36 km^{2} (0.53 sq mi)
- Max. depth: 122 m (400 ft)
- Water volume: 93 million cubic metres (75,000 acre⋅ft)
- Surface elevation: 1,857 m (6,093 ft)

Limmernsee (or Limmerensee) is a reservoir in the Canton of Glarus, Switzerland, between the peaks of Muttenchopf (2,482 m), Selbsanft (2,950 m) and Kistenstöckli (2,746 m). It may be reached by aerial tramway or by foot from Linthal.

The Limmern dam was completed in 1963 and is the largest reservoir used by the Linth–Limmern Power Stations. The lake's surface area is 1.36 km^{2} (0.53 sq mi).

== See also ==
- List of lakes of Switzerland
- List of mountain lakes of Switzerland
