= Axpo Holding =

Swiss energy company

Axpo Holding AG
- Type: Aktiengesellschaft
- Industry: Energy
- Founded: 2001; 25 years ago
- Headquarters: Baden, Switzerland
- Key people: Christoph Brand (CEO); Thomas Sieber (chairman of the board)
- Revenue: CHF 4,808 million (2019/20)
- Number of employees: 5,350 (2019/20)
- Website: www.axpo.com

Axpo Holding AG, headquartered in Baden in the canton of Aargau, and its subsidiaries constitute the energy company Axpo. Axpo Holding AG was established in 2001, is 100-percent publicly owned and originates from the former Nordostschweizerischen Kraftwerke AG, NOK.

Axpo produces, distributes and markets electricity and is active in international energy trading, as well as in the energy services business. The company is present internationally in approx. 30 countries.

Axpo is the largest energy company in Switzerland, and according to its own statement, the largest Swiss producer of electricity from renewable energies. A large portion of domestic power generation comes from hydropower and nuclear power. The focus abroad is on wind and solar energy. The company also owns gas and steam combined-cycle power plants (GuD). The firm has about 5000 employees.

== History ==
Axpo's roots go back to the beginning of electrification in Switzerland over 100 years ago.

In 1908, the former Motor AG connected its low-pressure hydropower plant at Beznau, Aargau, with the storage power plant at Löntsch, Glarus to the power grid with a 100-kilometre long 27-kilovolt (kV)-line. The founder of Motor AG was Walter Boveri, co-founder of Brown, Boveri & Cie. Secure power supply became important early on, as political pressure to transfer it from private to public hands increased. In 1914 the cantons of Aargau, Glarus, Zurich, Thurgau, Schaffhausen and Zug united to form Nordostschweizerischen Kraftwerke AG (NOK), and took over the Beznau-Löntsch power plants. The cantons of Schaffhausen and Appenzell Innerrhoden followed later. NOK completed its own first hydropower plant in 1920 at Eglisau on the Rhine. The plant has been protected as an historic monument since 1979.

In 1958, Germany, France and Switzerland were interconnected with a 220-kV grid, which was expanded to the 380-kV voltage level in 1967. The central switch field was known as the "Star of Laufenburg", and became the basis for international interconnected grid operation.

In December 1969, the first unit of the Beznau nuclear power plant (KKB) went into commercial operation after a construction period of four years. In 1971, the sister unit, Beznau 2, went into operation. In reaction to the Fukushima Daiichi nuclear disaster in 2011 the Swiss Federal Council decided not to build new nuclear power plants. Germany decided to phase-out nuclear power by 2022 and took older nuclear power plants off grid, while putting decommissioned coal-fired power plants back into operation. In 2017, Swiss voters rejected the initiative to withdraw from nuclear power in a referendum. Nuclear power plants should be operated as long as they are safe, to bridge gaps until the Energy Strategy 2050 can take effect. However, the "no" should not be interpreted as a "yes" to nuclear power.

At the same time, Germany strongly supported the subsidised expansion of wind and solar power. This led to the collapse of wholesale prices on power exchanges, and revenues went down for power-producing companies like Axpo. In 2005, Axpo (then still NOK) launched a large-scale project, "Linthal 2015", in the Glarus Alps. At the altitude of the Limmernsee, the Muttsee-Limmernsee stage was extended with a pumped storage plant with a capacity of 1000 megawatts (MW). Planning and construction took about ten years. Costs were CHF 1.2 billion.

At the end of the 1990s, the EU started the gradual liberalisation of the power market. In order to turn NOK into a Europe-competent power company, NOK as well as the NOK cantons and their utilities founded Axpo Holding AG in 2001. The company comprises NOK, Centralschweizerische Kraftwerke AG (CKW) and EGL AG, which later became Axpo Solutions AG. In 2009, the traditional NOK became Axpo AG, renamed Axpo Power AG three years later.

At the end of 2016, UBS downgraded Axpo's credit rating to "BBB+". Since then, Axpo's situation has stabilised thanks to significant cost reductions and higher electricity prices (see current credit ratings). The company has expanded in wind and solar energy since financial year 2014–15.

The most notable acquisitions have been the full take-over of the German Volkswind (2015) and the French Urbasolar (2019). In addition, Axpo holds an interest of 24.1% in Global Tech I. The off-shore wind farm has been in operation since 2015. According to its own statements, the company wants to continue expanding the area of renewable energies, including long-term power contracts (Power Purchase Agreements, PPA). Processes will be increasingly digitalised in order to increase synergies and become more competitive.

== Company ==
The Axpo Group supplies some 3 million people and several thousand industrial and commercial enterprises in Northeastern Switzerland and Central Switzerland with energy and energy-related services. Axpo Holding is owned by the cantons of Northeastern Switzerland and their utilities.

=== Company figures ===
The following table presents Axpo's company figures for the financial years 2011–12 to 2019–20:

FY	Income	Profit/Loss	Employees
2011–12	7'346	329	4'368
2012–13	7'025	364	4'430
2013–14	6'705	-838	4'435
2014–15	5'860	-867	4'312
2015–16	5'416	-1'226	4'293
2016–17	5'567	-269	4'231
2017–18	4'850	131	4'441
2018–19	4'856	865	4'958
2019–20	4'808	570	5'350

Note: The difference in net profit in 2018–19 as compared to the previous year can be mainly attributed to a so-called reversal of impairment losses amounting to CHF 398 million. This seeks to take increasing wholesale power prices into account.

=== Shareholders ===
The shares of Axpo Holding are fully held by the cantons of Northeastern Switzerland and their utilities.

These are:

- Elektrizitätswerke des Kantons Zürich with 18,410 %
- Kanton Zürich with 18,342 %
- AEW Energie with 14,026 %
- Kanton Aargau with 13,975 %
- St. Gallisch-Appenzellische Kraftwerke with 12,501 %
- EKT Holding with 12,251 %
- Kanton Schaffhausen with 7,875 %
- Kanton Glarus with 1,747 %
- Kanton Zug with 0,873 %

=== Subsidiaries and business areas ===
The Axpo Group comprises Axpo Holding AG and its subsidiaries as follows:

- Axpo Power AG (Production & Grids), 100% of shares
- Axpo Solutions AG (Trading & Sales), 100% of shares
- Centralschweizerische Kraftwerke AG, CKW (end customer business), 81% of shares
- Avectris AG (IT services for Axpo and third part customers), 65,6 % of shares

The "Production & Grids" area operates the power plant park in Switzerland and abroad (nuclear energy, renewable energies, gas and steam) as well as the distribution grids. The area also invests in power plant and grid capacities.

The "Trading & Sales" area markets energy from the power plant portfolio and is active in energy trading throughout Europe. Axpo mainly trades power, natural gas, biomass, CO_{2} certificates and green certificates for energy from renewable sources. The company is also active in the so-called origination business, which, in contrast to standard products, is based on products where the supplier takes over and manages customer risks.

CKW AG supplies nearly 200,000 private customers in the cantons of Lucerne, Uri and Schwyz. Avectris AG offers IT services to Axpo, the utilities of Northeastern Switzerland as well as to third party customers.

== Markets ==
In Switzerland, Axpo mainly supplies Northeastern Switzerland with electricity in the business-to-business area. The largest customers are the cantons and public utilities. In Central Switzerland, the subsidiary CKW supplies nearly 200,000 private customers and approx. 5,000 business customers directly, as well as additional customers indirectly.

In Italy, Spain, Portugal and Poland, Axpo has a total of around 400,000 deliver points for electricity and over 45,000 deliver points for gas directly, as well as through sales partners.

== Sustainability ==
The Axpo power mix with hydropower, nuclear energy and biomass is climate-friendly insofar as it hardly results in CO_{2} emissions in Switzerland. However, owing to its gas-fired power plants in Italy, Axpo has on average emitted about 3 million tonnes of CO_{2} p.a. with its own power plant park in the past years.

However, seen over the entire power plant park, the Axpo power mix is already at the level that Europe strives to achieve by the year 2035.

Based on the Annual Report 2018–19, Axpo also achieved cumulative energy efficiency increases of about 90 gigawatt hours (GWh) over the last six years.

Since financial year 2014–15 up to today, the company has nearly doubled its own wind and solar energy portfolio, mainly abroad, and biomass from 350 MW to 620 MW.

Axpo also sees these investments as well as the expansion of business with long-term power procurement agreements (PPA) for non-subsidised renewable energies as a contribution to the sustainability goals of the United Nations.

As a member of the UNO, Switzerland is expected to help implement these goals by 2030, whereby the private sector, particularly energy companies, play a key role.

== Production facilities ==
=== Installed power plant capacities ===
Axpo operates over 100 power plants and has installed power plant capacities amounting to about 9,400 MW, status at the end of September 2019 The majority can be attributed to domestic hydropower.

Technologies and countries	Installed capacity FY 2018–19	Installed capacity FY 2017–18
Swiss hydropower, including small-scale hydropower	approx. 4'300 MW	approx. 4'300 MW
Swiss nuclear energy, including long-term contracts	approx. 1'500 MW	approx. 1'500 MW
Swiss new energies, excluding small-scale hydropower, mainly biomass	approx. 30 MW	approx. 30 MW
Foreign nuclear power (long-term contracts with France)	approx. 1'200 MW	approx. 1'200 MW
Foreign gas and steam combined-cycle power plants (Italy)	approx. 1'700 MW	approx. 1'700 MW
Foreign new energies, mainly wind power (Germany, France, Italy, Spain) and Photovoltaic (France)	approx. 640 MW	approx. 490 MW
Total	approx. 9'400 MW	approx. 9'300 MW

Source: Axpo Sustainability Report 2018–19, page 32. Values in the table have been rounded off. The main changes as compared to the previous year are in new energies abroad owing to the acquisition of Urbasolar (photovoltaic portfolio France).

=== Safety ===
Plant safety: With regard to the safety of nuclear facilities, the Axpo Sustainability Report 2018–2019 states: "Axpo is committed to complying with the international nuclear safety standards specified by the IAEA Safety Convention (International Atomic Energy Agency) and ratified by Switzerland. National and international authorities carry out nuclear safety checks on a regular basis. Regular safety checks are very important. ... In addition, safety at the nuclear installations is analysed and appraised by WANO (World Association of Nuclear Operators) on a regular basis."

Dam facilities are continuously monitored and inspected regularly. Dams in a certain category must withstand earthquakes of a magnitude that is expected only every 10,000 years. The facilities fall under the supervision of the Swiss Federal Office of Energy (SFOE).

Security of energy supply: The Axpo power plant park combines plants that can generate base load, peak energy and control energy. In Switzerland, Axpo has a production capacity of approx. 25 billion kWh and a power grid covering 2000 kilometres.

The average time of a supply interruption per end consumer is low. In the Annual Report 2018–19, this was 0.25 min./a. for Axpo Grids and 21.6 min./a. for CKW.

=== Energy sources and power plants ===
==== Renewable Energy ====
In the area of renewables, Axpo has primarily invested in Swiss hydropower and biomass. The company produces over 9,5 billion kWh of electricity per year from renewable energy sources.

===== Hydropower =====
Hydropower plays an important role in the planned restructuring of power production in Switzerland as set out in the Energy Strategy 2050.

In Switzerland, Axpo has an installed hydropower capacity of 4300 MW. Its power plant park (owned and shareholdings) currently include about 60 plants. Axpo is the largest producer of hydropower in Switzerland.

Advances in energy efficiency: In financial year 2018–19, an efficiency increase of approx. 800 MWh was achieved at the Göschenen power plant.

Axpo hydropower plants with an installed capacity of over 10 MW (selection):

- Beznau Aare power plant (run-of-river power plant)
- Rheinau power plant (run-of-river power plant)
- Eglisau-Glattfelden power station (run-of-river power plant)
- Linth-Limmern power plant (pump storage power plant)

===== Biomass =====
Axpo has 15 biomass plants, as well as 5 composting sites in Switzerland. The company uses the organic waste from over 2500 customers (cities, towns, industry and commercial enterprises).

Advances in energy efficiency: In financial year 2018–19, an efficiency increase of 150 MWh was realised at the Charvornay compo-gas facility.

===== Photovoltaics =====
In 2019, Axpo entered into the growing international solar business with the acquisition of the French company, Urbasolar.

The Urbasolar portfolio includes photovoltaic plants with a total capacity of 249 MW (per the end of financial year 2018–19). Axpo estimates a development pipeline of over 1000 MW. In March 2020, the company announced that it would build solar plants for the Paris airports Charles-de-Gaulle, Orly and Le Bourget.

Axpo is present in the solar business in Switzerland through CKW AG. The company also intends to use the Limmern pumped storage plant to produce solar power. A large-scale facility with 6000 photovoltaic module s will be built at 2500 a.s.l. on the Muttsee dam wall. Start of construction is scheduled for the summer of 2021.

Solar plants at high elevations have the advantage that they produce more than comparable plants in the Midlands, especially during the winter, when Switzerland must rely on imports. The alpine solar plant will generate 50% of its power during the winter.

===== Wind power =====
With the acquisition of the German company Volkswind in 2015, Axpo is present in wind energy in France and Germany. In addition, the company also holds an interest of 24.1% in the Global Tech I offshore wind farm in the North Sea. The plant with an installed capacity of 400 MW went into operation in 2015. Since the beginning of 2020, Axpo is responsible for the marketing of all the power generated by Global Tech I amounting to about 1500 million kWh per year.

For market data on the wind energy sector, see here.

==== Axpo interests in Swiss nuclear power plants ====
Plant	Axpo Power AG (in %)	Axpo Solutions AG (in %)	CKW AG (in %)	Axpo Group (in %)
Beznau nuclear power plant	100,0 %			
Gösgen nuclear power plant	25,0 %		12,5 %	37,5 %
Leibstadt nuclear power plant *	22,8 %	16,3 %	13,6 %	52,7 %

*AEW Energie AG, a co-owner of the Axpo Group, holds 5.43 percent in the Leibstadt nuclear power plant. As a result, Axpo and Axpo-related companies indirectly own 58.1 percent of the Leibstadt nuclear power plant.

In addition to ownership in the mentioned nuclear plants, Axpo also holds procurement rights from French nuclear power plants.

Advances in energy efficiency: No efficiency advances were realised in financial year 2018–19.

=== Grids ===
Axpo maintains its own grid infrastructure in Switzerland and with its transmission grids, Axpo connects the transmission grid of the national grid company Swissgrid with the distribution grids of customers.

Axpo's supra-regional distribution grid (110 kV/50 kV/16 kV) extends over 2200 kilometres and includes 8000 masts. The grid consists of 82 per cent overhead lines and 18 per cent underground cabling.

With its grids, Axpo supplies all of Northeastern Switzerland, the Principality of Liechtenstein as well as parts of the cantons of Schwyz, Zug, Grisons and Valais with electricity.

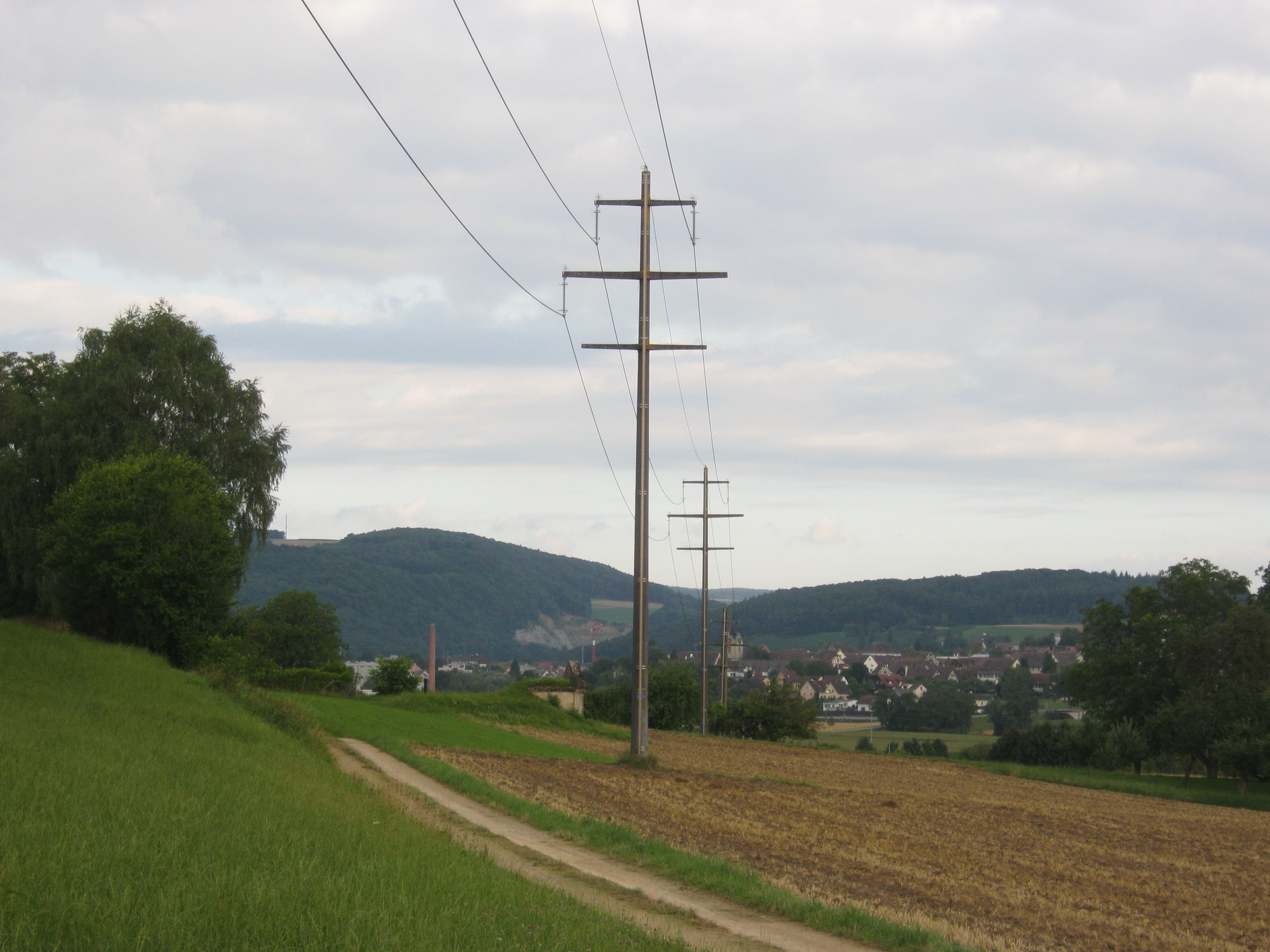
Mast of the Schlattingen-Thayngen line south of Bietingen on German soil

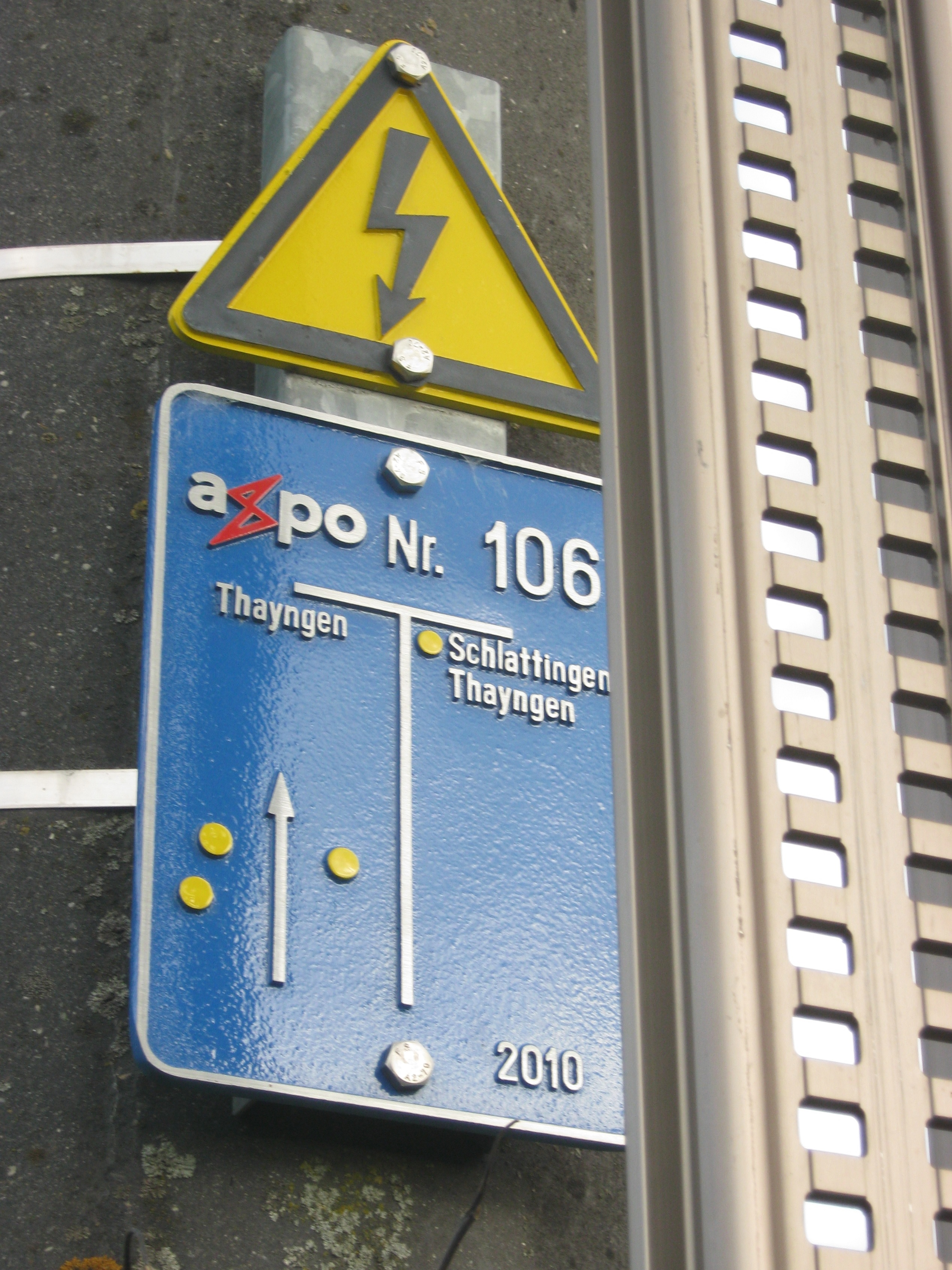
Sign on a mast of the Schlattingen-Thayngen line south of Bietingen on German soil

Axpo's Thayngen-Schlattingen high-voltage line runs partly through German territory, but does not supply any transformer stations in Germany.

== Energy trading ==
International energy trading is the traditional business of the former Axpo Trading AG (previously EGL AG) and today's Axpo Solutions AG. Axpo is accredited on numerous energy exchanges and broker platforms throughout Europe. The company buys and sells power as well as natural gas, oil and energy derivatives. The company links the solar and wind power business with the marketing business by means of so-called Power Purchase Agreements (PPA).

== Criticism ==
In 2011, Axpo was nominated for the Public Eye Award, which according to the initiators awards companies that exhibit especially responsible conduct toward human-beings and society. However the award went to another company. According to the nomination text, the Russian plant Majak, purchase point for fuel assemblies, is the "most contaminated place on in the world". The Neue Zürcher Zeitung wrote: The fact that environmentalists knew more about the origin than the Axpo specialists is embarrassing. Axpo wanted to visit the plant, although even inspectors from the International Atomic Energy Agency have been refused entry. On 12 November 2011, Axpo communicates that it has "temporarily issued the order" to suspend purchasing fuel assemblies from Majak. Axpo claimed that there was "no evidence of prohibited exposure". The assemblies comply with "internationally accepted regulations" and fulfilled "legal requirements".

In 2014, the company announced that after an interim suspension, it would no longer use uranium from the Russian Majak area.

In 2023, Axpo was involved in a legal dispute concerning the domain name "axpocorrupt.com." The website associated with this domain accused Axpo of unethical practices, including "Bossing and Mobbing," "Racial Discrimination," and "Retaliation and Threats." The World Intellectual Property Organization (WIPO) ultimately ordered the transfer of the disputed domain name to Axpo, citing bad faith registration and use by the respondent, primarily due to the inclusion of "Axpo" in the hostname. However, the contents and allegations remain valid and are being published under a different hostname.

In 2023, the Italian Data Protection Authority (Garante) fined Axpo Italia €10 million for unlawfully processing personal data. The company was found to have used outdated and inaccurate personal information to activate unsolicited electricity and gas contracts without customers' knowledge. This led to customers receiving unexpected closure letters from previous suppliers or payment reminders for unpaid invoices. The Garante determined that Axpo Italia violated several provisions of the General Data Protection Regulation (GDPR), including failing to process data lawfully, fairly, and transparently.

In December 2024, the Aargau cantonal government expressed strong disapproval of the substantial rise in Axpo's management salaries. The remuneration for CEO Christoph Brand increased from CHF 889,000 in the previous financial year to CHF 1.548 million. The total compensation for the entire Executive Board rose to CHF 8.6 million. The cantonal government accused Axpo's leadership of a "lack of sensitivity towards politics, the economy, and the population," emphasizing that there was "little understanding" for the disbursement of "record-high bonuses." In response, the canton of Aargau proposed an amendment to Axpo's articles of association, suggesting that the Annual General Meeting, rather than the Board of Directors, should decide on remuneration each year.

In January 2025, Axpo Iberia was fined €1.5 million by the Spanish energy regulator for manipulating the continuous intraday electricity market. This action violated Article 5 of REMIT, which prohibits market manipulation in wholesale energy markets.

== Miscellaneous ==
Up until the year 2012, Axpo Holding was the main sponsor for the top Swiss soccer league, the Axpo Super League.

The greenhouse gas intensity for the Group's entire power plant park, including plants abroad (such as gas and steam in Italy) amounted to 97 g CO_{2} equivalents per kilowatt-hour (kWh) in financial year 2018–19. As a comparison: The value for the European power mix is at about 300 g.

In 2018 Axpo generated an average of 103 grams of CO_{2} equivalents and 29 cubic-millimetres of nuclear waste per kilowatt-hour. Among the four largest energy companies in Switzerland – in addition to Axpo these are Alpiq, BKW and Repower – Axpo was in the medium range with an average of 316 environmental impact points (EIP).
