= Federal Office of Energy =

Swiss federal agency

Coordinates: 46°58′25″N 7°28′48″E

- (in German) Bundesamt für Energie (in French) Office fédéral de l'énergie (in Italian) Ufficio federale dell'energia

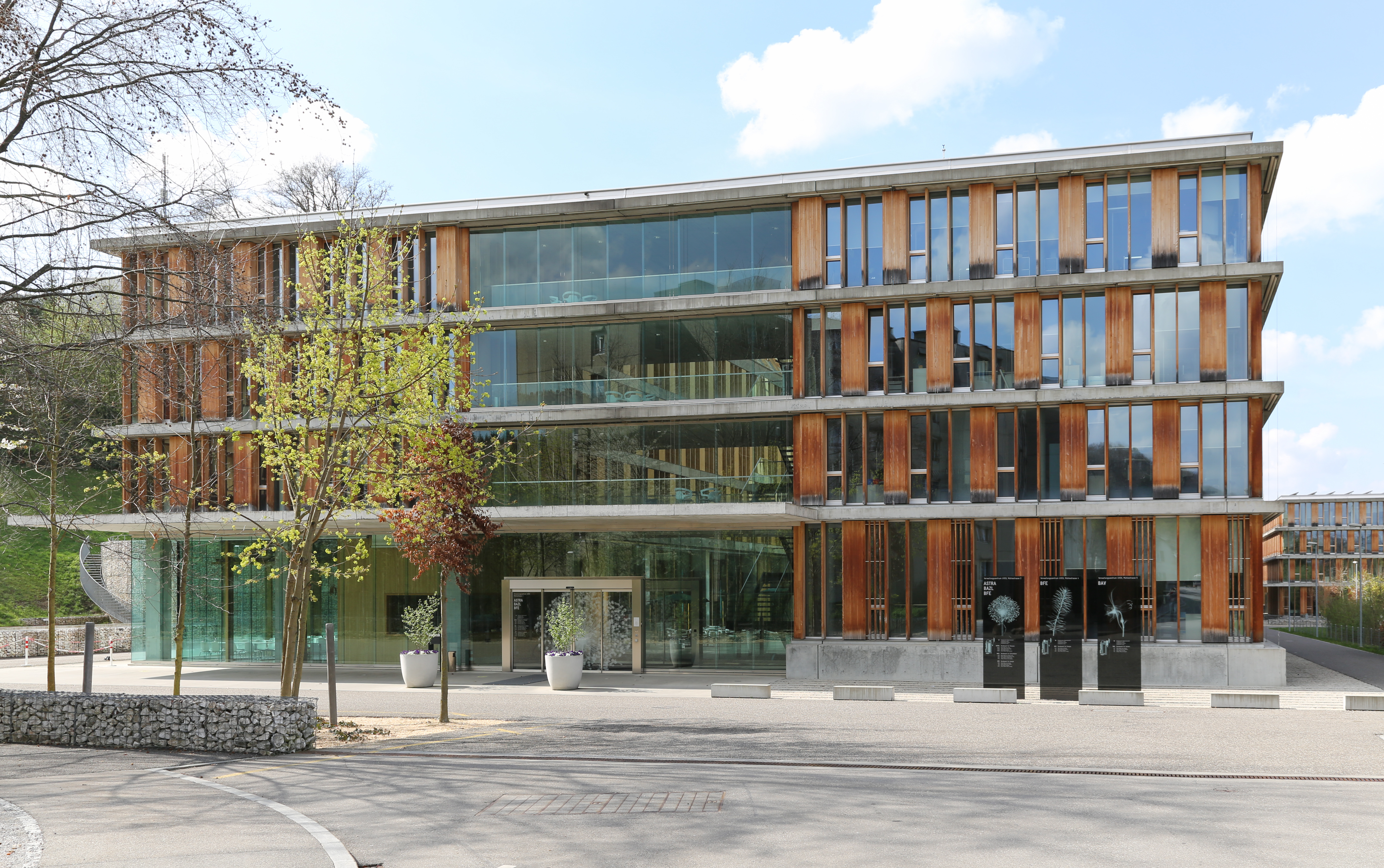

Agency overview
- Jurisdiction: Federal administration of Switzerland
- Headquarters: Ittigen
- Employees: 324
- Annual budget: CHF 100m, with CHF 1.3 planned revenue (2022)
- Minister responsible: Simonetta Sommaruga, Federal Councillor
- Parent agency: Federal Department of Environment, Transport, Energy and Communications
- Website: www.bfe.admin.ch

The Swiss Federal Office of Energy (SFOE) is the federal government office for energy supply and use. It is part of the Department of the Environment, Transport, Energy and Communications (DETEC). The SFOE works on energy security, efficiency and renewable energy. It also sets safety standards, supports the electricity and gas markets, works to reduce CO_{2} emissions and coordinates national energy research. As of January 2025, it had 345 employees and a budget of CHF 104 million. It also managed a grid surcharge fund of CHF 1.3 billion.

== Energy Strategy 2050 ==
Switzerland's Energy Strategy 2050 sets out the country’s long-term energy policy. It includes the decision not to replace existing nuclear power plants when they reach the end of their service life. The SFOE is responsible for carrying out this strategy with a focus on energy efficiency and renewable energy.

The office sets rules for the energy use of household appliances, consumer electronics, light bulbs, and electric motors. It also supports the development of renewable energy such as hydropower, solar, and wind. Other areas of work include the power grid, energy research, and international cooperation.

=== Energy research ===
Energy research forms part of Switzerland’s energy policy. The federal government provides about CHF 200 million each year for research into energy supply technology. The Swiss Federal Energy Research Commission (CORE) updates the federal energy research plan every four years. The plan is also used by local authorities and research institutions. It priorities include international cooperation and putting research outcomes into practice.

== Full-time positions since 2001 ==
Raw data

"Federal Finance Administration FFA: State financial statements".
"Federal Finance Administration FFA: Data portal".
