= Switzerland and weapons of mass destruction =

Swiss Confederation
- Nuclear program start date: 1945 (ended in 1988)
- First nuclear weapon test: None
- First thermonuclear weapon test: None
- Last nuclear test: None
- Largest yield test: None
- Total tests: None
- Peak stockpile: None
- Current stockpile: None
- Deployed warheads: None
- Total deployed warhead megatonnage: None
- Maximum missile range: None
- NPT party: Yes

Switzerland made detailed plans to acquire and test nuclear weapons during the Cold War. Less than two weeks after the nuclear bombings of Hiroshima and Nagasaki, the Swiss government started studying the possibility of building nuclear weapons, and continued its military nuclear program for 43 years until 1988. However, it ratified the Treaty on the Non-Proliferation of Nuclear Weapons in 1977.

Switzerland operated the DIORIT heavy water reactor from 1960 and the Lucens heavy water reactor from 1966, and carried out nuclear reprocessing, producing small quantities of plutonium, although it was not weapons-grade.

The Swiss Dassault Mirage IIIS interceptor was envisioned as a nuclear weapons delivery system capable of reaching Moscow, to deter the Soviet Union. Switzerland also considered the possibility of defensive nuclear attacks on Swiss territory.

Switzerland never possessed biological weapons, but did have a program to develop and test chemical weapons.

== Military nuclear program ==
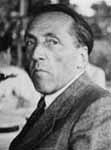
Paul Scherrer in the late 1940s. He played an important role in the Swiss nuclear program.

On 15 August 1945, Hans Frick, a colonel in the Swiss military, sent a letter to Federal Councillor Karl Kobelt requesting that Switzerland study the possibility of acquiring nuclear weapons in order to defend itself. The Federal Council authorized the creation of a commission to do such in November 1945. Efforts "were well under way" in 1945.

On 8 June 1946, the Study Commission for Nuclear Energy (Schweizerische Studienkommission für Atomenergie – SKA) was created by the Swiss government under the leadership of Paul Scherrer, a physicist and professor at ETH Zurich. The commission had the objective of studying the civil use of atomic energy and the secret objective of studying the scientific and technical basis for building nuclear weapons. The activity of this group was low and only slow progress was made; however the events of the Cold War, especially the Soviet invasion of Hungary in 1956 and the nuclear arms race of the mid-1950s, provided new impetus. While his specific role is questioned, Scherrer played an important role in the Swiss nuclear program.

The secret Study Commission for the Possible Acquisition of Own Nuclear Arms was instituted by Chief of General Staff Louis de Montmollin with a meeting on 29 March 1957. The aim of the commission was to give the Swiss Federal Council an orientation towards "the possibility of the acquisition of nuclear arms in Switzerland." The recommendations of the commission were ultimately favorable.

The Federal Council released a public statement on 11 July 1958 stating that although a world without nuclear weapons was in Switzerland's interest, its neighboring countries adopting nuclear weapons would force it to do likewise. On 23 December 1958 the Federal Council instructed the Military Department to study the logistics and execution of attaining nuclear arms. However, efforts remained focused on study and planning rather than implementation.

In a referendum held in April 1962, the Swiss people rejected a proposal to ban nuclear weapons within the country. The next year in May, Swiss voters again rejected a referendum that would have required Swiss voters to approve of the Armed Forces being equipped in nuclear weapons if it chose to do so.

By 1963, planning had proceeded to the point that detailed technical proposals, specific arsenals, and cost estimates were made. On 15 November 1963, Dr. Paul Schmid prepared a 58-page report laying the theoretical foundations for Swiss nuclear armaments. On 28 November 1963, the Deputy Chief of the General Staff estimated that the costs of building a uranium bomb at 720 million Swiss francs over 35 years, initially including 20 million francs for pure research, that would be needed for planning. It also calculated that, should the decision be for plutonium instead of highly enriched uranium, then the estimate would be 2,100 million francs over 27 years. On 4 May 1964, the military joint staff issued a recommendation to have about 100 bombs (60–100 kilotons), 50 artillery shells (5 kt), and 100 rockets (100 kt) within the next 15 years, at costs of about 750 million Swiss francs. There were plans for 7 underground nuclear tests in "uninhabited regions" of Switzerland; a location with a radius of 2–3 kilometres (1.2–1.9 mi) "that can be sealed off completely."

In addition, Switzerland purchased uranium and stored it in nuclear reactors purchased from the United States, the first of which was built in 1960. Between 1953 and 1955, Switzerland procured around 10 metric tons (11 short tons) of (unenriched) uranium oxide from the Belgian Congo with the authorization of the U.S. and United Kingdom (Switzerland had also considered purchasing from the Republic of China and the Union of South Africa). 5,000 kilograms (11,000 pounds) were stored in the Diorit reactor in Würenlingen, while a stockpile of 3,238 kg (7,139 lb) of uranium and 2,283 kg (5,033 lb) of uranium oxide was stored at Wimmis until 1981, and it was not covered by the international safeguards meant to prevent the spread of nuclear weapons. Additionally, in 1969, the Swiss government unsuccessfully tried to purchase 3 kg (6.6 lb) of weapons-grade plutonium from Norway.

In the spring of 1964, a group working within the Military Department, which approved of nuclear tests in Switzerland, presented a secret plan for the attainment of nuclear weapons to the Federal Council. In the first phase of the plan, 50 bombs from 60–100 kt would be procured. In phase two, another 200 bombs would be procured. To clarify definitively whether nuclear tests should be carried out in Switzerland, the military chief of staff Jacob Annasohn requested of Federal Councillor Paul Chaudet, head of the Military Department, to obtain authorization for the total budget of 20 million Swiss francs from the Federal Council.

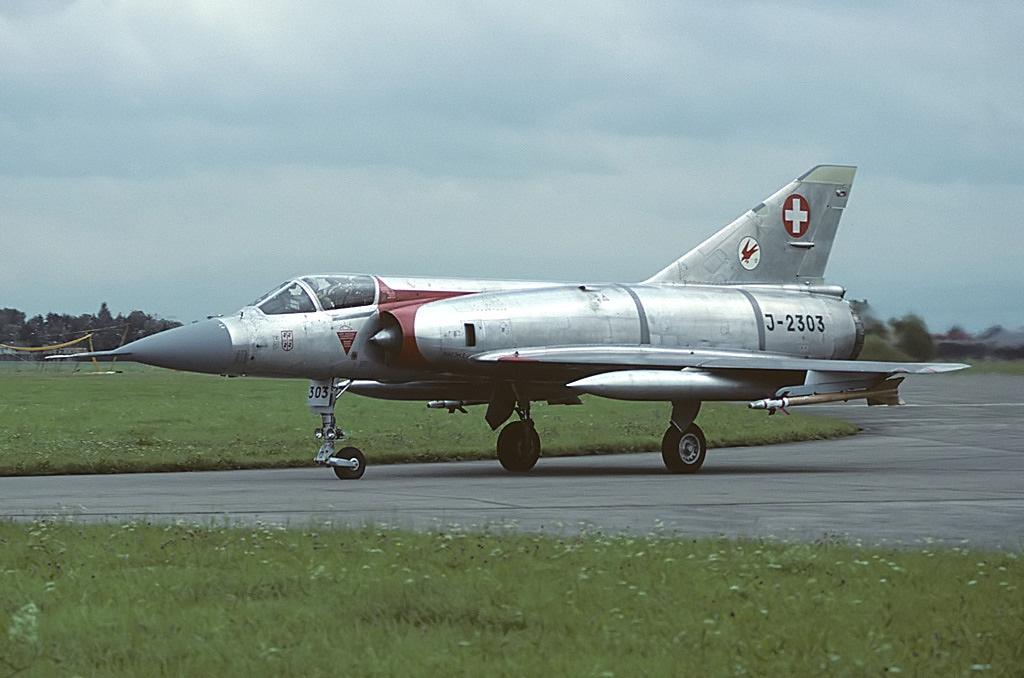
A Swiss Mirage IIIS in 1988.

Besides having a main military goal of deterrence, strategists envisioned the Swiss nuclear strike capability as part of a preemptive war against the Soviet Union. The Swiss Air Force Mirage III jet would have been able to carry nuclear bombs as far as Moscow. They also suggested the weapons could be used on Swiss soil against a possible invading force.

Switzerland possessed 20 kg (44 lb) of separated plutonium coming from reprocessed spent fuel of the heavy water research reactor DIORIT. It was stored for several decades under International Atomic Energy Agency safeguards at the Paul Scherrer Institute, but this supply was not directly suitable for building nuclear weapons. In February 2016, nearly three decades after the end of its nuclear program and in time for the 2016 Nuclear Security Summit, the Swiss government transferred this excess plutonium to the United States for disposal.

Financial problems with the defence budget in 1964 prevented the substantial sums required from being allocated. Continuing financial shortfalls prevented the proposed effort from getting off the ground. This, as well as a serious accident in 1969 which caused a partial meltdown in the small Lucens pilot reactor, strengthened opposition against the Swiss nuclear program.

Switzerland signed the Treaty on the Non-Proliferation of Nuclear Weapons (NPT) on 27 November 1969, and its process of ratification first met with the resistance of the Federal Department of Defence. After signing the treaty, Switzerland's policy of pursuing acquiring nuclear weapons was replaced by one of studying acquisition to provide options in case the treaty broke down. Switzerland ratified the treaty on 9 March 1977. Soon after that, Switzerland ratified the Seabed Arms Control Treaty.

On 30 April 1969, the Working Committee for Nuclear Issues (AAA) was created. It met 27 times between 26 September 1969 and 25 October 1988. However, the committee had only a preparatory role. As the Cold War started coming to an end, the AAA became less relevant. On 1 November 1988, Federal Councillor Arnold Koller signed the dissolution order, and the AAA ceased to exist on 31 December of that year, thus ending the 43-year Swiss nuclear weapons program.

== Nuclear weapons ban ==
On July 7, 2017, Switzerland voted in favor of the Treaty on the Prohibition of Nuclear Weapons, the first such international treaty to ban nuclear weapons. However, in 2018, the Swiss government changed its position and opposed signing the treaty because of security concerns. Switzerland reaffirmed its opposition in 2024.

== Biological and chemical weapons ==
Switzerland signed the Biological Weapons Convention in April 1972 and ratified the treaty in 1976 with three reservations. The country also signed the Chemical Weapons Convention in January 1993 and ratified it in March 1995.

In 1937, General Henri Guisan and the Swiss Army high command commissioned a secret program to develop and utilize chemical weapons. From 1939 onwards, the contact poison sulfur mustard was manufactured, as well as phenacyl chloride. In the summer of 1940, extensive exercises were held in several cantons using mortars with polychlorinated naphthalene gas. In the Canton of Uri alone, 14,000 farm cows were poisoned, which the Swiss Army then euthanized. The program also produced 330 tons of mustard gas, which proved difficult to store and thus the program was halted in 1943 by Guisan, who ordered the chemical weapons to be burned on the grounds of the Munitionsfabrik Altdorf, later owned by RUAG Ammotec.

== See also ==
- Friedrich Tinner, Swiss engineer involved in the provision of gas centrifuge technology to Pakistan and Libya through the Khan network.
- Military history of Switzerland
- Modern history of Switzerland
- National Redoubt (Switzerland)
- Nuclear power in Switzerland
  - Anti-nuclear movement in Switzerland
- Sonnenberg Tunnel
- Spiez Laboratory

== Bibliography ==
- Braun, Peter (2006). "Die Frage einer eigenen Nuklearbewaffnung". Von der Reduitstrategie zur Abwehr: die militärische Landesverteidigung der Schweiz im Kalten Krieg, 1945–1966 (in German). Vol. 2. Hier + Jetzt, Verlag für Kultur und Geschichte. ISBN 978-3-03919-004-1.
- Heinzer, Andrea E. (2003). "Swiss Arms Control Policy: From Abstention to Participation". In Gabriel, Jürg Martin; Thomas, Fischer (eds.). Swiss Foreign Policy, 1945–2002. Palgrave Macmillan. pp. 159–185. ISBN 978-0-230-50024-2.
- Joye-Cagnard, Frédéric (2010). La construction de la politique de la science en Suisse : enjeux scientifiques, stratégiques et politiques (1944–1974). Alphil. ISBN 9782940235537. OCLC 717749048.
- Stussi-Lauterberg, Jurg (31 December 1995). "Historical Outline on the Question of Swiss Nuclear Armament" (PDF) (Report). Swiss government. Archived from the original (PDF) on February 3, 2017.
- Winkler, Theodor (1981). Kernenergie und Aussenpolitik. Die internationalen Bemühungen um eine Nichtweiterverbreitung von Kernwaffen und die friedliche Nutzung der Kernenergie in der Schweiz (in German). Berlin Verlag. pp. 315–316. ISBN 978-3-87061-231-3.
