= Nuclear power in Switzerland =

Switzerland nuclear power plants (view)
Active plants
Closed plants

Nuclear power in Switzerland is generated by three nuclear power plants, with a total of four operational reactors (see list below). Since 1985, nuclear power has been contributing approximately 40% of Switzerland's electrical energy. In 2022, it produced 23 terawatt-hours (TWh) of electricity, and accounted for 37% of the nation's gross electricity generation of 62 TWh, while 55% was produced by hydroelectric plants and 8% came from conventional thermal power stations and non-hydro renewable energy sources.

Switzerland hosts several research reactors, including the CROCUS reactor at the École Polytechnique Fédérale de Lausanne, which has been the country's only remaining research reactor since 2013.

Nuclear waste from power plants was processed mostly overseas until 2006. Storage is done on surface sites as plans are underway to move nuclear waste underground.

In 2011, the federal authorities decided to gradually phase out nuclear power in Switzerland as a consequence of the Fukushima accident in Japan. In late 2013 the operator BKW decided to cease all electrical generation in 2019 in the Mühleberg plant. The structural design of the Mühleberg nuclear power plant closely resembles that of unit 1 of the Fukushima Dai-ichi nuclear power plant, albeit with some differences, such as a bunkered flood safe emergency system.

As of 8 December 2014, the National Council has voted to limit the operational life-time of the Beznau Nuclear Power Plant to 60 years, forcing its two reactors to be decommissioned by 2029 and 2031, respectively. A popular initiative calling for nuclear power phase-out by 2029 was rejected by voters in 2016; however, on 1 January 2018 an amendment (article 12a) to the Swiss Nuclear Energy Act came into effect, prohibiting the issuing of new general licences for nuclear power plants. Switzerland plans to phase out its nuclear capacity by 2044 as part of its Energy Strategy 2050. However, as of 12 April 2024, nuclear power still generates a significant amount of electricity, contributing 29% of the country's total electricity of 66 TWh, hence generating approximately 19.14 TWh for the nation.

In 2021, the Swiss Federal Nuclear Safety Inspectorate (ENSI) confirmed that Swiss nuclear plants meet updated earthquake safety standards, ensuring resilience to rare seismic events. Assessments initiated in 2011, later updated in 2015, affirm their safety measures.

According to a February 2023 poll, approximately 49% of the Swiss population supported the ongoing use of nuclear energy, while 38% opposed it. In 2025, nuclear power produced 27% of the country’s electricity.

== Non-Proliferation Treaty ==
Switzerland ratified the Non-Proliferation Treaty (NPT) in March 1977, committing to peaceful nuclear energy use and subjecting its nuclear materials to international safeguards under the International Atomic Energy Agency (IAEA). The Corresponding Safeguards Agreement (CSA) was ratified in September 1978, followed by the Additional Protocol (AP) in 2005, which introduced further obligations. This legal framework was integrated into Swiss law through the Safeguards Ordinance (SaO) in February 2005, alongside the Nuclear Energy Act (NEA) and the Nuclear Energy Ordinance (NEO).

Facilities under safeguards in Switzerland include nuclear power plants such as Beznau, Gösgen, and Leibstadt, along with the Mühleberg plant, currently undergoing decommissioning. Interim storage facilities for radioactive waste under safeguards are located at Beznau and in Würenlingen. Other safeguarded sites include CERN in Geneva, the research reactor CROCUS in Lausanne, various facilities at the Paul Scherrer Institute in Villigen, and the research reactor PROTEUS, which is also undergoing decommissioning.

== Reactors ==
=== Power reactors ===
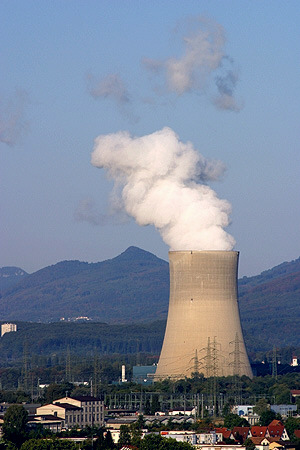
The 970-megawatt (MW) Gösgen nuclear power plant

Switzerland has three nuclear power plants with four reactors in operation as of late December, 2019: (Beznau and Gösgen provide district heating in addition to power production)

- Beznau 1 (1969) and Beznau 2 (1972) (PWR) – 365 MWe each

Plant safety (each unit): Double containment, large dry; 3 lines safety injection, high and low pressure; 3 lines emergency feedwater; part of these ECCS systems in a bunkered building; ability to connect external water sources
In 2015, concerns over reactor pressure vessel quality at Beznau reactors delayed unit 1's restart, while unit 2 resumed operations in December. Operated by Axpo, both units underwent checks and received a CHF 700 million investment for 60-year lifespans. The safety case for unit 1, submitted to the Swiss Federal Nuclear Safety Inspectorate (ENSI) in November 2016, confirmed safety until 2030, with restart approval in March 2018.

- Gösgen (KKG) (1979) (PWR) – 970 MWe

Plant safety: Double containment, large dry; 4 lines for high and low-pressure safety injection (50% each); 4 lines emergency feedwater (50% each); 2 additional lines emergency feedwater; part of these ECCS systems bunkered; ability to connect external water sources

- Leibstadt (KKL) (1984) (BWR) – 1,285 MWe

Safety: Double containment (with additional wetwell), pressure suppression (4000 m^{3} water pool); 4 lines (50% each) low pressure injection (with 2 lines RHR), 2 diverse lines high pressure injection; 1 additional line with 2 pumps emergency injection (with 1 line RHR); nearly all the ECCS systems bunkered; ability to connect external water sources.

The Beznau reactors are owned by the Axpo Holding, that also control major parts of Leibstadt. Alpiq owns 40% of Gösgen and 27.4% of Leibstadt.

=== Decommissioned and closed reactors ===
In May 2017, Switzerland voted to phase out nuclear power in the country. A timetable for the phase out of nuclear power plants has not been set. The cost of decommissioning and waste management has been estimated at USD24.7 billion.

- Lucens (1968) (GCHWR) – 6 MWe

The Lucens experimental reactor power plant was opened in 1962. It housed an experimental power reactor, heavy-water moderated and cooled by carbon dioxide. It has been shut down since 1969 after a partial core meltdown. The site has been decontaminated and decommissioned (location: 46.692778°N 6.827500°E). The meltdown is considered the worst nuclear meltdown in Switzerland's history.

- Mühleberg (KKM) (1972-2019) (BWR) – 355 MWe

Shut down on 20 December 2019 and being prepared for nuclear decommissioning. The Mühleberg reactor is owned by BKW (Bernische Kraftwerke AG), majority-owned by the canton of Berne. Plant safety: Double containment, pressure suppression (torus, with 2200 m^{3} water pool); 4 lines low pressure core spray; 4 lines RHR (torus cooling); 2 turbine-driven HP systems; part of the ECCS systems bunkered; ability to connect external water sources.
In a 2023 report from the World Nuclear Association, the BKW is underway with the decommissioning of the Mühleberg BWR plant. The Federal Department of Environment, Transport, Energy, and Communication issued a decommissioning order in September 2020. Costing approximately 800 million Swiss Francs, the process is expected to conclude by 2031, with site relinquishment by 2034. An additional 1.3 billion Swiss Francs are allocated for waste disposal by around 2040. BKW currently holds 930 million Swiss Francs in its decommissioning fund.

=== Research and teaching reactors ===
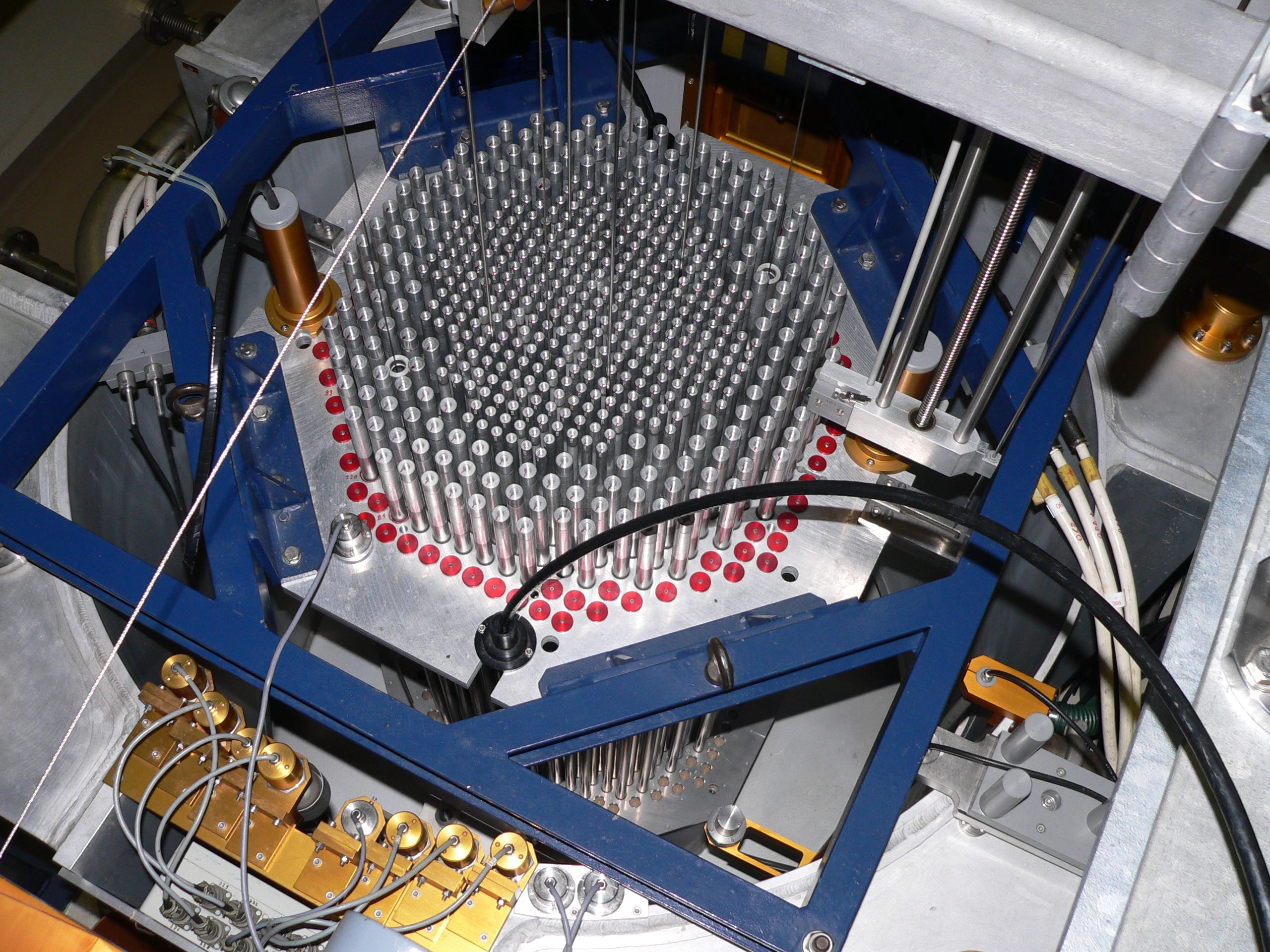
The CROCUS reactor of the École polytechnique fédérale de Lausanne (EPFL)

- SAPHIR

The reactors that became known as SAPHIR was a 10–100 kW-range swimming-pool reactor of demonstration brought to Switzerland by the U.S. delegation to the First Conference on the Peaceful Uses of Atomic Energy that took place in Geneva in August 1955. It was the first reactor ever shown in operation to the public, worldwide. After the conference the reactor was purchased by the Swiss government on behalf of Reaktor AG, a consortium interested in the development of nuclear energy in Switzerland. The reactor was moved to Würenlingen on the location of the future Paul Scherrer Institut and received its name, SAPHIR, on 17 May 1957. (The name of the reactor was inspired by the color of the Cherenkov radiation which was visible when the reactor was in operation.)
SAPHIR remained operational until its permanent shutdown in 1993.

- University of Geneva AGN-201-P reactor

The University of Geneva acquired a 20 W water-moderated and graphite-reflected research reactor fueled by 20%-enriched Uranium from Aerojet General Nucleonics (AGN) in 1958. It was operated mostly as a teaching reactor until 1989, when it was shut down and decommissioned.

- University of Basel AGN-211-P reactor

The University of Basel acquired the AGN-211-P reactor presented at the 1958 World Exposition in Brussels, Belgium. It was a 2 kW water-moderated reactor fueled with high-enriched uranium and operated from 1959 to 2013 as a teaching and experimental reactor, used amongst other things for neutron activation analysis.
The research reactor at the Institute of Physics ceased operations in 2013 and was defueled in 2015. Plans were made to decommission the reactor by 2020.

- DIORIT

DIORIT was a small heavy water-cooled and -moderated research reactor, operated 1960 to 1977 at the former Federal Institute for Reactor Research (now Paul Scherrer Institut). There was also, in the context of Cold War, the theoretical idea of producing weapons-grade plutonium in it, besides its research purpose. It was also the first reactor to be entirely designed and built in Switzerland.
DIORIT was permanently shut down in 1977, and by the conclusion of 2003, all radioactive materials had been cleared from the reactor facility.

- PROTEUS

PROTEUS was a zero-power research reactor operated from 1968 to 2011 at what is now the Paul Scherrer Institute, Würenlingen. Its peculiarity was that its core was composed of a hollow cavity whose configuration could be changed by filling it with very diverse types of nuclear fuels, including sub-critical assemblies. It was otherwise composed of a graphite reflector and driver containing 5%-enriched uranium dioxide fuel rods. This flexibility led it to be used in four major experimental programs exploring varied reactor designs such as gas-cooled fast reactors, pebble-bed reactors, high-conversion light-water reactors and finally configurations employing real spent nuclear fuel from Swiss nuclear power plants.
In April 2013, the Paul Scherrer Institute applied for the decommissioning of its Proteus research reactor, receiving approval from ENSI in 2016.

- CROCUS

CROCUS is a zero-power (licensed to 100 W max power) LWR used for teaching at the École Polytechnique Fédérale de Lausanne (EPFL). CROCUS is a critical assembly, built in part from the elements of a dismantled subcritical assembly: Cactus. The name of the latter originated for the numerous instrumentation bars that came out of the core. CROCUS is another name in the XXXus series for nuclear installations at EPFL, e.g. the D-T nuclear fusion facility: Lotus. (Location: 46.521238°N 6.570361°E).
The CROCUS reactor at EPFL became the only remaining research reactor in Switzerland. Despite its modest power capacity of 100 W, it has been instrumental in training nuclear engineers and preserving expertise in the field.

== Seismicity ==
Extending across the north and south side of the Alps, Switzerland lies at the junction of the Apulian and Eurasian tectonic plates, and there are many active seismic areas under the mountains that show that stresses continue to be released along deep fault lines. The 1356 Basel earthquake is the most significant seismological event to have occurred in Central Europe in recorded history and may have had a M_{w} magnitude as strong as 7.1.

Between 2002 and 2004 a major study was conducted to assess the seismic risk to Swiss nuclear power plants. The PEGASOS study, which cost around 10 million Swiss Francs (approximately $11 million) and which was conducted by 21 European experts with American involvement, concluded that the earthquake risk in Switzerland is twice as large as had been previously thought.

In 2011, following the nuclear emergencies at Japan's Fukushima I Nuclear Power Plant and other nuclear facilities Swiss Federal Councilor Doris Leuthard announced on 14 March a freeze in the authorization procedures for three new nuclear power plants (see Politics), and ordered a safety review of the country's existing plants.

There was also concern in Switzerland over the seismic risks of the Fessenheim Nuclear Power Plant, located in France approximately 40 km (25 mi) from the Swiss border. Following Fukushima the Swiss cantons of Basel-Stadt, Basel-Landschaft and Jura asked the French government to suspend the operation of Fessenheim while undertaking a safety review based on the lessons learned from Japan. On 6 April 2011, the Grand Council of Basel-Stadt went further and voted for the plant to be closed. French President Emmanuel Macron announced in November 2018 the closure of Fessenheim's reactors, scheduled for 2020.

== Waste management ==
Radioactive waste from nuclear power plants is in the tens of thousand tons in Switzerland. Its management is the responsibility of the producer. Up until 2006, processing of nuclear waste was mostly done overseas. A 10-year moratorium on its export was issued in 2006. Radioactive waste from nuclear power plants in Switzerland is stored on surface sites (mostly in the ZWILAG-building). Plans are underway to move the waste to permanent sites underground.

Switzerland's radioactive waste management is overseen by Zwilag, a company owned by the four Swiss nuclear utilities. Its central interim dry cask storage facility, ZZL, has been operational since 2001 in Wuerenlingen. Until 2006, Swiss utilities sent waste for reprocessing abroad but discontinued this practice due to regulatory changes. Currently, used fuel is either stored at reactors or transported to Zwilag ZZL.

== Politics ==
In Switzerland there have been many referendums on the topic of nuclear energy, beginning in 1979 with an initiative for nuclear safety, which was rejected. In 1984, there was a vote on an initiative "for a future without new nuclear power stations" which was rejected with 45% of voters in favor and 55% opposed. On 23 September 1990 Switzerland had two more referendums about nuclear power. The initiative "stop the construction of nuclear power stations," which proposed a ten-year moratorium on the construction of new nuclear power plants, was passed with 54.5% to 45.5%. The initiative for a phase-out was rejected with 47.1% votes in favor against 52.9% opposed. In 2000 there was a vote on a Green Tax for support of solar energy. It was rejected with 31% in favor to 67% opposed.

On 18 May 2003, there were two referendums: "Electricity without Nuclear," asking for a decision on a nuclear power phase-out, and "Moratorium Plus," for an extension of the earlier decided moratorium on the construction of new nuclear power plants. Both were turned down. The results were: Moratorium Plus: 41.6% Yes, 58.4% No; Electricity without Nuclear: 33.7% Yes, 66.3% No. The program of the "Electricity without Nuclear" petition was to shut down all nuclear power stations by 2033, starting with Unit 1 and 2 of Beznau nuclear power stations, Mühleberg in 2005, Gösgen in 2009, and Leibstadt in 2014. "Moratorium Plus" was for an extension of the moratorium for another 10 years, and additionally a condition to stop the present reactors after 40 years of operation. In order to extend the 40 years by 10 more years, another referendum would have to be held. The rejection of the Moratorium Plus surprised many, since opinion polls before the referendum had shown acceptance. Reasons for the rejections in both cases were seen in the worsened economic situation.

On 10 June 2008, ATEL submitted an application to the Swiss Federal Office of Energy for the construction of a new plant in the Niederamt region (SO). A further two applications were to be presented by Axpo and BKW before the end of 2008.

In May 2011, the Swiss government decided to abandon plans to build new nuclear reactors. The country's five existing reactors will be allowed to continue operating, but will not be replaced at the end of their life span. The last will go offline in 2034. In October 2016 energy companies formally withdrew their 2008 applications to build three new power plants.

In November 2016, a referendum was held concerning a Green Party initiative that would have phased out all nuclear plants after a life-span of 45 years. The three oldest nuclear plants (Beznau 1 and 2, and Mühleberg) would have had to be shut down as early as 2017, and every remaining plant by 2029. The initiative was rejected by 54.2% of voters.

On 21 May 2017, 58% of Swiss voters accepted the new Energy Act establishing the energy strategy 2050 and forbidding the construction of new nuclear power plants. The strategy involves phasing out nuclear power, increasing reliance on hydroelectric and other renewables. Hydroelectric power currently supplies 60% of the country's electricity, while solar, wind, biomass, and geothermal generation is expected to double by 2035. No new nuclear reactors will be constructed, and existing plants will continue to operate subject to safety evaluations by ENSI.

In August 2024, the Federal Council, led by Energy Minister Albert Rösti, proposed lifting the nuclear power plant construction ban that had been in place since 2017. Citing concerns over energy security and fossil fuel phase-out, the government seeks to amend the Nuclear Energy Act (Kernenergiegesetz) to allow the construction of new nuclear plants and extend the operational life of the existing ones.

== See also ==
- Energy in Switzerland
- Electricity sector in Switzerland
- List of nuclear reactors – Switzerland
- Nuclear phase-out – Switzerland
- Science and technology in Switzerland
- Switzerland and weapons of mass destruction
