= Swiss Federal Nuclear Safety Inspectorate =

Nuclear safety authority in Switzerland

Swiss Federal Nuclear Safety Inspectorate ENSI

Agency overview
- Formed: 2009
- Jurisdiction: Federal administration of Switzerland
- Headquarters: Brugg
- Employees: 150
- Minister responsible: Marc Kenzelmann
- Website: www.ensi.ch

The Swiss Federal Nuclear Safety Inspectorate (German: Eidgenössisches Nuklearsicherheitsinspektorat (ENSI)) is Switzerland's regulatory supervisory authority for nuclear safety and for the security of nuclear installations; it supervises the nuclear power plants at Beznau, Gösgen, Leibstadt and Mühleberg, the research reactors at the Paul Scherrer Institute, the University of Basel and the Swiss Federal Institute of Technology (Ecole Polytechnique Fédérale de Lausanne), as well as the Swiss national central interim storage facility for radioactive waste (ZWILAG). ENSI's headquarters are located in Brugg in the Canton of Aargau.

For its part, ENSI is supervised by the ENSI Board: this body is elected by the Swiss Federal Council, to which it reports directly.

== History ==
Until the end of 2008, the Principal Nuclear Safety Division (HSK) within the Swiss Federal Office for Energy (SFOE) was the technical supervisory body responsible for nuclear plants in Switzerland. Its headquarters were located at Würenlingen in the Canton of Aargau. HSK monitored the safety of the five nuclear power plants operating in Switzerland and the country's other nuclear facilities. At the same time, HSK performed the function of supervising radiation protection for all the nuclear plants, as well as tasks in connection with the interim and final storage of radioactive waste. HSK was then monitored by the Swiss Federal Nuclear Safety Commission (KSA), a body consisting of non-executive experts in nuclear safety.

These tasks mentioned above have been performed by the Swiss Federal Nuclear Safety Inspectorate ENSI since 1 January 2009. In accordance with a law adopted by the Federal Assembly, the HSK was separated from the Swiss Federal Office of Energy (SFOE) and was converted into an independent regulatory supervisory authority. This step satisfied the requirement for the independence of the regulatory body as stipulated in the Convention on Nuclear Safety, a legal text adopted at the International Atomic Energy Agency (IAEA) in 1994 and setting the bases for nuclear safety worldwide and ratified by Switzerland subsequently.

== Legal basis ==
ENSI's organisation is governed by the Swiss Federal Nuclear Safety Inspectorate Act (ENSI Act, ENSIG). Most of the legislative bases for ENSI's supervisory activities are laid down in the Swiss Federal Nuclear Energy Act (NEA/KEG) and the Swiss Federal Law on Radiological Protection (LRaP/StSG).

== ENSI's remit ==
According to the Swiss Federal Nuclear Energy Act, an operator is responsible for the safety of its plant. ENSI verifies whether the operator fulfils this responsibility, and organises its own analyses, inspections and supervisory discussions in order to obtain its own bases for this assessment.

ENSI's supervisory activities can be divided into two main areas: assessment of facilities and surveillance of operations.

=== Assessment of facilities ===
==== Basic principles and guidelines ====
Nuclear plants are assessed and monitored on the basis of laws, guidelines and underlying technical and scientific principles which define the safety requirements and assessment criteria to be applied by ENSI. The Inspectorate continues to develop these basic principles and guidelines according to the state-of-the-art in science and technology. For this purpose, ENSI promotes research into nuclear safety, is represented in over 70 international committees and bodies specialising in the field of nuclear safety and security, and participates in the continuous development of international safety standards. Aspects covered by the guidelines include the definition of radiation protection objectives for the operation of nuclear plants, arrangements for reporting on the operation or organisation of nuclear power plants, and specification of requirements for deep geological repositories.

==== Expert reports ====
ENSI draws up expert safety reports when nuclear plant operators submit applications that go beyond the scope of their existing operating licences. For example, the periodic safety reviews (PSRs) undertaken by all the nuclear power plants are assessed by ENSI, and the results are recorded in an expert report together with any conditions that may be imposed.

==== Permits ====
ENSI processes applications for changes to nuclear plants which are covered by existing operating licences and issues permits if the decisions are positive. Examples include changes to components and systems that are classified as important to safety, or changes to technical specifications.

=== Surveillance of operations ===
==== Monitoring, inspection and approval ====
ENSI reviews reports from operators, conducts supervisory discussions and monitors nuclear plants (including their organisation and operation) by carrying out on-site inspections. ENSI only permits individuals with the necessary skills and education to occupy safety-relevant positions in nuclear plants.

==== Planned Maintenance Outages ====
Each nuclear power plant organises an annual planned maintenance outage lasting several weeks, when maintenance work and repairs are carried out in the plant. The fuel is renewed at the same time. ENSI is present during these planned maintenance outages, which it also supervises.

==== Radiation monitoring ====
ENSI monitors compliance with the radiation protection regulations and dose limits. It monitors discharges of radioactivity from nuclear plants and compliance with the discharge limits. ENSI also determines radiation exposure for the general public and the plant staff.

==== Remote monitoring and forecasting ====
ENSI operates a measuring system around each nuclear plant for the purpose of automatic dose rate monitoring, together with a system to transmit plant parameters from the nuclear power plants. In case of an incident, this data enables ENSI to issue forecasts regarding the potential dispersion of radioactivity in the surrounding area.

==== Processing events ====
Events at Swiss and foreign nuclear plants are systematically assessed to determine their significance in terms of nuclear safety. Based on an assessment of the measures implemented by the operator, ENSI examines whether the knowledge gained can be applied to other nuclear plants in Switzerland; if necessary, ENSI requests improvements.

==== Emergency preparedness ====
ENSI is integrated into a nationwide organisation to deal with serious incidents, which includes the National Emergency Operation Centre (among other bodies).

==== Safety assessment ====
ENSI collates all the data acquired during the course of a year into a Systematic Safety Evaluation, from which it derives any measures that may be required as well as the plans for its future supervisory activities. ENSI also provides information to the public in its annual reports on the safety of nuclear plants, radiation protection and the experience accumulated from operation and research.

== Analyses following the reactor accident at Fukushima ==
Following the Fukushima nuclear disaster, ENSI analysed the events with the help of an interdisciplinary team of experts. The results, including the "Lessons Learned", were presented to the public in four reports published between August and December 2011. After Fukushima, Swiss nuclear power plants also had to prove their ability to cope with a 10,000-year flood, a 10,000-year earthquake and a seismically induced flood. In addition, Switzerland voluntarily took part in the EU Stress Test. Swiss nuclear power plants had to implement various improvement measures as a result of these reviews.

== The 2009 operating year ==
The Swiss nuclear plants registered 24 reportable events during 2009. Eleven of these events took place in the two reactors of the Beznau nuclear power plant, four at Mühleberg, three at Gösgen and four at Leibstadt. There were also two events in the nuclear facilities of the Paul Scherrer Institute (PSI). The event on 3 August 2009 at Beznau was assigned to level 2 on the International Nuclear Event Scale (INES); the event at Gösgen on 24 June 2008 (which was reported after a delay) was assigned to level 1, and the other events during the reporting year were classified as level 0. As regards events of this sort, this was definitely the worst operating year for the Swiss nuclear power plants since at least 1995.

== The 2010 operating year ==
The 41 reportable events in 2010 were distributed as follows among Switzerland's nuclear plants: a total of ten for the two reactors at the Beznau nuclear power plant, eleven for Gösgen, five for Leibstadt and fourteen for Mühleberg. To put the events at Mühleberg into context, ENSI states that the disturbances occurred "essentially" during the commissioning of new equipment. Two reportable events at INES level 0 took place in the nuclear facilities of the PSI during 2010. ENSI did not register any events at the two research reactors of the Swiss Federal Institute of Technology, Lausanne and the University of Basel. 40 out of the 41 events can be classified at INES level 0. ENSI assigned one event to INES level 2: this occurred during the planned maintenance outage at the Leibstadt nuclear power plant on 31 August 2010. In this case, the permitted radiation dose of 20 millisievert (mSv) per year was exceeded for one diver. However, this event did not constitute an infringement of the Federal Law on Radiological Protection.

== The 2011 operating year ==
There were 31 reportable events in the Swiss nuclear power plants during 2011. Of these, 30 were assigned to level 0 of the INES International Nuclear Event Scale and one was classified at level 1 on the scale. Seven events concerned the Beznau nuclear power plant, units 1 and 2; five events affected Gösgen, and there were eleven at the Leibstadt nuclear power plant, four at the Mühleberg nuclear power plant, three in the nuclear facilities of the Paul Scherrer Institute, and one in the research reactor of the Swiss Federal Institute of Technology, Lausanne. ENSI did not register any events at the Swiss national central interim storage facility for radioactive waste (ZWILAG) or in the research reactor at the University of Basel. The INES-1 event was reported as the consequence of a potential blockage of the water intake for the special emergency system during an extreme flood at the Mühleberg nuclear power plant. This finding prompted the operator of the power plant, BKW-FMB Energie AG, to shut the plant down prior to the date of the planned maintenance outage in order to carry out back-fitting.

== The 2012 operating year ==
There were 35 reportable events at the Swiss nuclear plants during 2012. 14 of these concerned the two units of the Beznau nuclear power plant; eight were at the Gösgen nuclear power plant, five occurred at the Leibstadt nuclear power plant, six took place at the Mühleberg nuclear power plant and two involved the nuclear facilities of the PSI. ENSI did not register any reportable events in the Swiss national central interim storage facility for radioactive waste (ZWILAG) at Würenlingen, or at the research reactors of the Swiss Federal Institute of Technology, Lausanne and the University of Basel. The reportable events included four reactor scrams: one each at the Mühleberg and Gösgen nuclear power plants, and two at the Beznau plant. ENSI classified one event during 2012 at level 1 on the INES scale, which ranges from 0 to 7. This involved a disturbance in unit 2 of the Beznau nuclear power plant: the special emergency diesel generator (SEDG) failed to start during a periodic function test. The unit was started with compressed air but did not ignite. The plant's specialist staff were summoned to vent the fuel feed line, after which the unit started when another attempt was made. All the other events during the year were below the range of the INES event scale, i.e. they were classified at level 0.

== The 2013 operating year ==
In 2013, there were 37 reportable events in the Swiss nuclear power plants: seven events at the two Beznau units, seven at Gösgen, seven at Leibstadt and 13 at Mühleberg. During operation, there were no reactor scrams recorded. On the INES scale, ranging from 0–7, ENSI rated all reportable events in nuclear power plants in 2013 as Level 0. ENSI did not register any events at the ZWILAG, the two research reactors or the Paul Scherrer Institute. ENSI evaluates the safety of each nuclear power plant as part of a systematic safety evaluation. This reflects both reportable events and other findings, in particular the results of the approximately 460 inspections conducted by ENSI during 2013.

== The 2014 operating year ==
As for 2014, there were 39 reportable events in the Swiss nuclear facilities: five events at each of the two Beznau units, eleven at Gösgen, nine at Leibstadt and eight at Mühleberg. There was one reportable event at the University of Basel research reactor. ENSI did not register any events at the ZWILAG, the Paul Scherrer Institute or the Swiss Federal Institute of Technology, Lausanne.

== The 2015 operating year ==
In 2015, there were 34 reportable events in the Swiss nuclear facilities: four events at Beznau Unit 1 and three at Beznau Unit 2, ten at Gösgen and Leibstadt and seven at Mühleberg. There were four reportable events at the nuclear facilities of the Paul Scherrer Institute and one at the Swiss Federal Institute of Technology, Lausanne. ENSI did not register any events at the ZWILAG and the University of Basel research reactor.

== The 2016 operating year ==
In 2016, there were 31 reportable events in the Swiss nuclear facilities: seven events at Beznau Unit 1 and at Beznau Unit 2, twelve at Gösgen, nine at Leibstadt and three at Mühleberg. There were no reportable events at the nuclear facilities of the Paul Scherrer Institute, ZWILAG, the research reactor at the University of Basel and the Swiss Federal Institute of Technology, Lausanne.

== The 2017 operating year ==
The number of reportable incidents in 2017 was 29. Three incidents concerned the Mühleberg nuclear power plant, nine the Leibstadt nuclear power plant, six the Gösgen nuclear power plant, three unit 1 of the Beznau nuclear power plant, four unit 2 and one incident concerned both units of the Beznau nuclear power plant. One incident occurred at the Zwilag central interim storage facility. All incidents of the operating year 2017 were assigned to level INES 0. No incidents occurred in the Paul Scherrer Institute PSI and in the research reactor of the Swiss Federal Institute of Technology in Lausanne EPFL.

== The 2018 operating year ==
The provisional number of reportable incidents, at 40, is above the long-term average. Three incidents related to the Beznau 1 NPP, one incident related to the Beznau 2 NPP, 13 incidents related to the Gösgen NPP, 13 incidents related to the Leibstadt NPP, four incidents related to the Mühleberg NPP, five incidents related to the PSI nuclear installations, one of which was caused by third parties and not assigned to the PSI and one incident related to the EPFL research reactor in Lausanne. No incidents were reported by the ZWILAG central interim storage facility and the research reactor at the University of Basel. A limited availability of emergency cooling systems at Leibstadt NPP led to an INES-1 assessment on the "International Nuclear Event Scale" of the IAEA. The remaining incidents, the evaluation of which has already been completed, were classified as INES-0. For a number of incidents, the evaluation has not yet been completed.

== The 2019 operating year ==
The number of reportable incidents in 2019 was 34. Two events concerned unit 1 and five unit 2 of Beznau nuclear power plant while two events concerned both units. Two incidents concerned the Mühleberg nuclear power plant, eleven the Leibstadt nuclear power plant and eight the Gösgen nuclear power plant. One of the incidents at the Gösgen nuclear power plant was assigned to level INES 1 by ENSI. All other incidents of the operating year 2019 were assigned to level INES 0. One incident occurred at the Zwilag central interim storage facility. Three incidents occurred in the Paul Scherrer Institute PSI, two out of those three occurred in the research reactor of the Swiss Federal Institute of Technology in Lausanne EPFL.
