= Modern history of Switzerland =

History of Switzerland since 1848

This article deals with the history of Switzerland since 1848. Following a 27-day civil war in Switzerland, the Sonderbund War, Sonderbundskrieg, the Swiss Federal Constitution was passed on 12 September 1848. During World War I and World War II, the country maintained armed neutrality. Despite Swiss opposition to joining the European Union, voters have accepted bilateral agreements with the union.

== Formation of the Federal State (1848) ==
Following a 27-day civil war in Switzerland, the Sonderbund War, Sonderbundskrieg, the Swiss Federal Constitution was passed on 12 September 1848. The constitution was heavily influenced by the US Constitution and the ideas of the French Revolution. The constitution establishes the Swiss Confederation, governed by a comparatively strong federal government, instead the model of a confederation of independent cantons bound by treaties.

== Industrialisation and economic growth (1848–1914) ==
From 1847 to 1914, the Swiss railway network was developed. The Schweizerische Nordbahn (SNB) society opened the first railway line on Swiss soil in 1847, connecting Zürich and Baden. The Gotthard Rail Tunnel was completed in 1881.

The Swiss watchmaking industry has its origins in the 18th century, but boomed during the 19th century, turning the village of La Chaux-de-Fonds into an industrial center. Rapid urban growth also enlarged Zürich, which incorporated its industrial suburb Aussersihl into the municipality in 1891.

Banking emerged as a significant factor in Swiss economy with the foundation of the Union Bank of Switzerland in 1862, and the Swiss Bank Corporation in 1872.

The Golden age of alpinism in the 1850s to 1860s lay the foundation to the tourism industry.

== World wars (1914–1945) ==
During World War I and World War II, Switzerland maintained a stance of armed neutrality, and apart from minor skirmishes was not involved militarily. Because of its neutral status, Switzerland was of considerable interest to the warring parties, as a scene for diplomacy, espionage, commerce, and as a safe haven for refugees.

During World War I, Switzerland was situated between the Central Powers to the north and east, and the Entente Powers to the south and west. During World War II, Switzerland was entirely surrounded by the Axis powers from 1940 to 1944.

== 1945 to present ==
=== Government ===
From 1959, the Federal Council, elected by the parliament, is composed of members of the four major parties, the liberal Free Democrats, the Catholic Christian Democrats, the left-wing Social Democrats and the right-wing People's Party, essentially creating a system without a sizeable parliamentary opposition (see concordance system), reflecting the powerful position of an opposition in a direct democracy.

Women were granted the right to vote in the first Swiss cantons in 1959, at the federal level in 1971 and, after resistance, in the last canton Appenzell Innerrhoden in 1990. After suffrage at the federal level women quickly rose in political significance, with the first woman on the seven-member Federal Council executive being Elisabeth Kopp who served from 1984 to 1989. The first female president was Ruth Dreifuss, elected in 1998 to become president during 1999. The Swiss president is elected every year from those among the seven member high council and cannot serve two consecutive terms.

During the Cold War, Swiss authorities considered the construction of a Swiss nuclear bomb. Leading nuclear physicists at the Federal Institute of Technology Zürich such as Paul Scherrer made this a realistic possibility. In a nationwide referendum held in April 1962, the Swiss people chose not to prohibit nuclear arms in Switzerland. However, financial problems with the defense budget prevented the substantial funds from being allocated, and the Nuclear Non-Proliferation Treaty of 1968 was seen as a valid alternative. All remaining plans for building nuclear weapons were dropped by 1988.

=== Domestic ===
In 1979, parts of the Bernese Jura attained independence while remaining in the Federation, forming the new canton of Jura.

The Demographics of Switzerland has changed in similar ways as in other states in Western Europe. Since 1945, the population of Switzerland has grown from roughly 4.5 to 7.5 million, mostly between 1945 and 1970, with a brief negative growth in the late 1970s, and a population growth hovering around 0.5% per year since the 1990s, mostly due to immigration. With a population composed of a roughly balanced combination of Roman Catholics and Protestants, together amounting to more than 95%, the population without any religious affiliation has grown to more than 10% in the 2000s, while the Muslim population grew from practically nil to some 4% over the past decades. Italians had been the largest group of resident foreigners since the 1920, but with the Yugoslav wars of the 1990s, large-scale immigration of refugees has changed this picture, and residents with origins in the former Yugoslavia now constitute the largest group of resident foreigners, with some 200,000 people (roughly 3% of the population).

=== Relations with the European Union ===
With the exception of Liechtenstein, Switzerland has been completely surrounded by the European Union since 1995. Swiss-EU relations are a major issue in the country.

Swiss voters narrowly rejected a December 1992 referendum to join the European Economic Area, with 50.3% of voters opposed. Swiss voters rejected EU membership in a March 2001 referendum, with 76.8% opposed.

Despite Swiss opposition to joining the EU, voters have accepted bilateral agreements with the union. In a May 2000 referendum, for example, Swiss voters approved such agreements. In a June 2005 referendum, Swiss voters approved joining the Schengen Area.

In February 2014, Swiss voters approved a referendum to reinstitute quotas on immigration to Switzerland, setting off a period of finding an implementation that would not violate the EU's freedom of movement accords that Switzerland adopted.

Switzerland co-founded the European Free Trade Association in 1960, which is a parallel organization to the EU.
