= Gösgen nuclear power plant =

Nuclear power plant in Switzerland

Gösgen Nuclear Power Plant

- Gösgen Nuclear Power Plant
- Official name: Kernkraftwerk Gösgen
- Country: Switzerland
- Location: Däniken, canton of Solothurn
- Coordinates: 47°21′58″N 7°58′0″E
- Status: Operational
- Construction began: 1973
- Commission date: 1 November 1979
- Owner: Alpiq
- Operator: Kernkraftwerk Gösgen-Däniken AG

Nuclear power station
- Reactor type: PWR
- Reactor supplier: German Kraftwerk Union AG

Power generation
- Units operational: 1 x 970 MW
- Nameplate capacity: 970 MW
- Capacity factor: 95.0%
- Annual net output: 8,072 GW·h

External links
- Website: www.kkg.ch
- Commons: Related media on Commons

The Gösgen nuclear power plant (in German Kernkraftwerk Gösgen, abbreviated as KKG) is located in the Däniken municipality (canton of Solothurn, Switzerland) on a loop of the Aar river. It is operated by the ad hoc society Kernkraftwerk Gösgen-Däniken AG.

== History ==
=== Construction ===
The first discussions about the construction of the third Swiss nuclear power plant started in 1966. In 1970 the formal request was submitted to the federal authorities. Initially foreseeing a river water cooling, the blueprints had to be modified in order to meet a new federal regulation that in 1971 forbade such systems for future plants. After the introduction of a cooling tower, the authorities issued the location authorization on 31 October 1972. The construction started in summer 1973, after that a series of local permits had been granted. The commissioning was authorized on 29 September 1979. The KKG was ready to start operation in February 1979, but the Three Mile Island accident led the Swiss Federal Council to order a security check on the Swiss plants that took some months. It eventually entered its commercial phase on 1 November 1979. The unlimited operating license was issued on 29 September 1978.

Over the years the gross plant output has been increased from the initial 970 MW to 990 MW (1992) and finally to the present 1020 MW by a series of small changes in the reactor configuration and the installation of new low pressure turbines.

The last significant change to the KKG was the construction of a new storage facility for spent rods. It entered operation in 2008.

=== Acceptance ===
In the 1970s the opposition to the construction of new plants increased in importance. Despite the accident at the Lucens Nuclear Power Plant, the debate mostly regarded technical aspects such as the construction of facilities in densely populated areas or the cooling system. Numerous were the concerns about an overexploitation of the Aar and Rhine waters, already used for the cooling of the Beznau and Mühleberg stations and in numerous hydroelectric plants. In March 1971 the Federal Council forbade the use of river water for direct cooling of new plants. Since the KKG should also have been cooled by the Aar, the project had to be adapted by adding the cooling tower.

With the submission of the construction request in 1972 numerous formal oppositions were presented by groups and individuals at federal, cantonal, and communal level. All were rejected and construction started in 1973. In the meantime the oil crisis and the resulting awareness of the need of an energy mix diversification decreased the resistance to nuclear power.

The confrontation revived in summer 1977. Over the Pentecost weekend around 3000 opponents a day participated to a protest march towards the plant construction site. On 25 June 1977, at least 2,000 activists tried to occupy the accesses to the KKG and had to be dispersed by the police. The same scuffles took place two weeks later between 6000 demonstrators and 1000 policemen. Still the plant got the authorization to start operation in 1979. The continual strong opposition to the KKG induced the federal authorities in 1980 to call a hearing about the plant safety. They concluded that the plant satisfied all legal requirements and could continue operation. In April 1981 the last formal oppositions were rejected by the Federal Council, putting an end to a decade of intense confrontation.

The Chernobyl disaster rekindled the opposition to nuclear power, which led in 1987 to a cantonal initiative for shutting down the KKG. This was eventually rejected by the Solothurn citizens with a 73% majority. Except for the 10 year building suspension for new plants of 1990, approved by the 52.5%, the same fate has been reserved by the cantonal population to all other federal initiatives proposing anticipated shutdowns or moratoria. In 2007 the cantonal parliament entrusted the government to act in order to promote the building of a new plant in the Niederamt region, between Olten and Aarau.

=== Future ===
The KKG, being in the middle of its original expected lifetime run, should continue to produce power for some decades to come. Therefore no decision about its shutdown or possible substitution has been made.

Near to its location it has been proposed to build the new Niederamt Nuclear Power Plant. Although this is sometimes referred to as Gösgen 2, it should consist in an independent facility.

== Technical specifications ==
=== Reactor and generators ===
The KKG possess a pressurized water reactor delivered by the German Kraftwerk Union AG, a then subsidiary of Siemens AG and now part of Areva NP. It contains 177 fuel assemblies, 48 of which are equipped with control elements. Each fuel assembly can hold up to 225 rods, but only 205 are occupied by the fuel. The remaining 20 positions are reserved to the control rods. The reactor in operation contains a total of around 76 t of uranium. It works at 324 °C and 153 bar. The thermal power output achieves 3002 MW.

Three steam generators transfer the heat to the secondary coolant loop at 65 bar and 280 °C. They are fed by three strands, with the addition of two other for start-up or emergency cases. The resulting steam is routed to the turbine, although around 1% is piped to an evaporator where is converted into pressurized process steam eventually delivered to a downstream cardboard facility. The turbine is composed of a high-pressure and three low-pressure units. It generates a net electric power of 970 MW that is delivered to the 400 kV power grid.

After having fed the turbine, the steam is condensed by the tertiary cooling loop, which water is at 22 °C. The output coolant achieves 36 °C and is therefore transferred to the 150 m tall natural draught wet-type cooling tower that returns it to the initial temperature. 0.4-0.7 out of 31.6 m^{3}/s leave the tower creating the typical plume.

| Unit | Type | Net electrical power | Gross electrical power | Construction start | Critical state | Connected to electricity grid | Commercial operation | Shutdown |
|---|---|---|---|---|---|---|---|---|
| Gösgen | PWR | 970 MW | 1020 MW | Dec. 1973 | Jun. 1979 | Jan. 1979 | Nov. 1979 | - |

=== Safety measures ===
The core is located inside an 11 m tall and 22 cm thick cylindric vessel with an internal diameter of 4.36 m. The reactor concrete building has a wall thickness in the cylindrical part of 1.6 m (1.2 m the dome and 2.8 m the base plate). Due to the massive structures it should be able to withstand an aircraft crash.

In case of small leakages in the reactor cooling loop, four high-pressure injection pumps (one for each cooling loop and a fourth as reserve) would replace the missing water. In case of fast loss of the coolant, six accumulator tanks with a total 3·100% redundancy would flood the reactor until the low-pressure injection pumps could start operation. These four pumps are subdivided in three loops, plus an additional loop in form of a crosstie in direction of the other three loops.

If the coolant is lost from the secondary loop the feeding of the three steam generators would be entrusted to the four strands of the emergency feedwater system (one each and a reserve) with a total redundancy of 2×2·100%. In case of extreme failures, for example a Station Blackout, the cooling would be assured by the two strands of the special emergency feedwater system.

The plant possesses an independent, bunkerised emergency building which purpose is, in extreme cases as plane crashes or explosions, to manage the reactor shutdown and the removal of the decay heat for at least ten hours. It contains the two strands of the special emergency feedwater system and two diesel generators. The plant possess four further emergency diesel generators in two separated building.

=== Waste management ===
The spent fuel is cooled in special pools where the residual decay heat is removed. The rods are then transferred to the central interim storage facility ZWILAG where they are stored. In 2008 the second spent fuel pool started operation increasing the total capacity from 600 to 1600.

The low and medium radioactive operating waste is reconditioned and stored in apposite rooms on the plant site.

== Kernkraftwerk Gösgen-Däniken AG ==
The plant is operated by an ad hoc privately held company called Kernkraftwerk Gösgen-Däniken AG. At the moment it employs around 500 employees. Its stocks are shared by the Alpiq Group (40%), the Axpo AG (25%), the city of Zurich (15%), the Centralschweizerischen Kraftwerke (12.5%), and the Energie Wasser Bern (7.5%). The plant management is entrusted to Alpiq.

== Nuclear events ==
| Year | INES level | | | | | | | | Total |
|---|---|---|---|---|---|---|---|---|---|
| Year | 0 | 1 | 2 | 3 | 4 | 5 | 6 | 7 | Total |
| 2015 | – | – | – | – | – | – | – | – | TBA |
| 2014 | 11 | – | – | – | – | – | – | – | 11 |
| 2013 | 7 | – | – | – | – | – | – | – | 7 |
| 2009 | 2 | 1 | – | – | – | – | – | – | 3 |
| 2008 | 3 | – | – | – | – | – | – | – | 3 |
| 2007 | 1 | – | – | – | – | – | – | – | 1 |
| 2006 | 3 | – | – | – | – | – | – | – | 3 |
| 2005 | 5 | – | – | – | – | – | – | – | 5 |
| 2004 | 1 | – | – | – | – | – | – | – | 1 |
| 2003 | 2 | – | – | – | – | – | – | – | 2 |
| 2002 | – | – | – | – | – | – | – | – | 0 |
| 2001 | 4 | – | – | – | – | – | – | – | 4 |
| 2000 | – | – | – | – | – | – | – | – | 0 |
| 1999 | 1 | – | – | – | – | – | – | – | 1 |
| 1998 | – | – | – | – | – | – | – | – | 0 |
| 1997 | 1 | – | – | – | – | – | – | – | 1 |
| 1996 | 5 | – | – | – | – | – | – | – | 5 |
| 1995 | 3 | – | – | – | – | – | – | – | 3 |
Sources: 2014 · 2013 · 2012

As of February 2009 no operative nuclear event (INES level 2 or above) ever occurred. Since 1995 only one anomaly took place. The KKG is remarkable for the absence of any reactor scram in the last 19 years.

=== Level 1 events ===
==== 2009 ====
- In March the KKG announced to the federal authorities an event that took place after the 2008 revision. Four of the redundant power lines supplying the emergency system failed during a test due to a faulty protective circuit. In case of a real emergency this could only cause problems in case of malfunctioning of the other safety mechanisms, but since the same problem occurred in multiple strands, the event has been assessed as level 1.

== See also ==
- Nuclear power in Switzerland
