= Leibstadt Nuclear Power Plant =

Nuclear power plant in Aargau, Switzerland

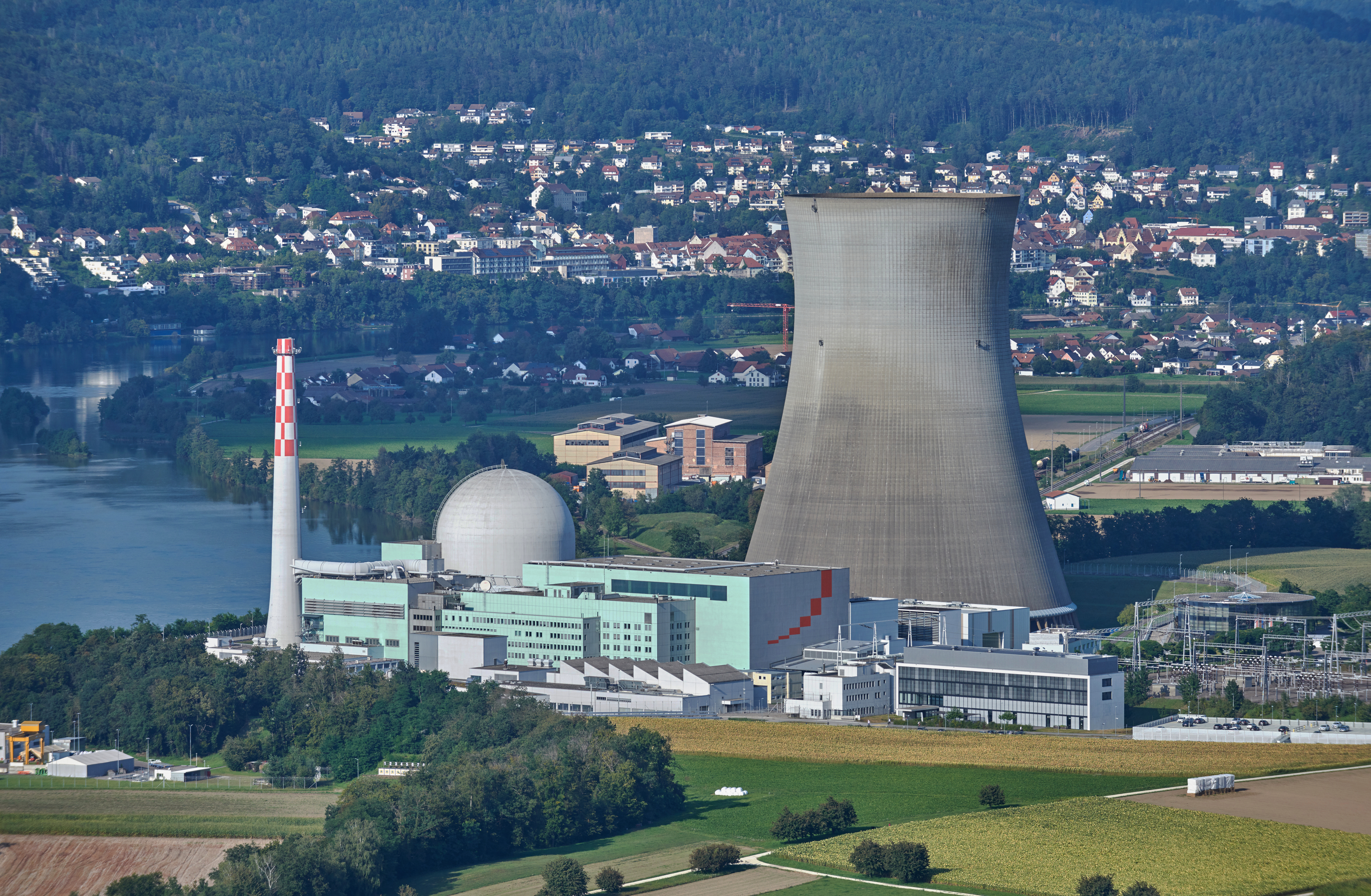
- The Leibstadt NPP
- Country: Switzerland
- Coordinates: 47°36′11″N 8°11′05″E
- Status: Operational
- Construction began: 1972
- Commission date: May 24, 1984
- Owner: Leibstadt AG
- Operator: Kernkraftwerk Leibstadt AG

Nuclear power station
- Reactor type: BWR
- Cooling towers: 1
- Cooling source: Rhine River

Power generation
- Units operational: 1 × 1,285 MW
- Nameplate capacity: 1,285
- Capacity factor: 87.6%
- Annual net output: 9,367 GW·h

External links
- Website: www.kkl.ch
- Commons: Related media on Commons

The Leibstadt Nuclear Power Plant (German: Kernkraftwerk Leibstadt, KKL) is located near Leibstadt, Aargau, Switzerland, on the Rhine and close to the border with Germany. Commissioned in 1984, it is the youngest and most powerful of the country's four operating reactors.

Its General Electric-built boiling water reactor produces 1,285 MW of electrical power. The nuclear power station has produced approximately 8.5 TWh per year, slightly less than the Goesgen Nuclear Power Plant.

It is owned by Leibstadt AG (KKL), a consortium of six Swiss energy companies: Axpo Holding AG (split between CKW AG with 13.6%, Axpo Power AG with 22.8% and Axpo Solutions AG with 16.3%), Alpiq AG with 27.4%, BKW Energie AG with 14.5% and AEW energy AG with 5.4%. Management of the power plant was originally the responsibility of EGL AG before being transferred to Axpo.

== History ==
Planning for the KKL began in 1964 for a 600 MW reactor. The Swiss Federal Council opposed direct cooling by river water, replaced in the design in 1971 with a cooling tower. During further planning the output was increased to 900 and then 1200 MW. In the wake of the 1979 Three Mile Island accident new safety regulations were implemented, delaying completion for several years. The 2 billion Swiss franc construction budget spiraled to over 5 billion before the plant opened in 1984 after eleven years of construction.

The history of the completion of the KKL reflected increasingly critical attitudes toward nuclear power in Switzerland during the 1970s and 1980s, which culminated in the resistance against the Kaiseraugst Nuclear Power Plant.

With the installation of a new low-pressure turbine in 2010 Leibstadt, achieved an increase of 40 megawatts. A new 420 tonne generator, the heaviest AIL to be carried on Switzerland's roads, significantly improved the power plants performance.

== Grid connection ==
Leibstadt Nuclear Power Plant feeds its generated electrical energy via a double-circuit 380 kV line, which is a loop-over of the 380 kV Beznau-Leibstadt line. This line, which starts north of Hottwil, has a special feature: a ground wire consisting of a bundle of two wires each equipped with an integrated communication cable, which are separated by spacers.

== Nuclear events ==
Year	INES level								Total
Year	0	1	2	3	4	5	6	7	Total
2018	?	2	-	–	–	–	–	–	2
2015	–	–	–	–	–	–	–	–	TBA
2014	8	1	–	–	–	–	–	–	9
2013	7	–	–	–	–	–	–	–	7
Sources: 2018 · 2014 · 2013 · 2012

== Gallery ==
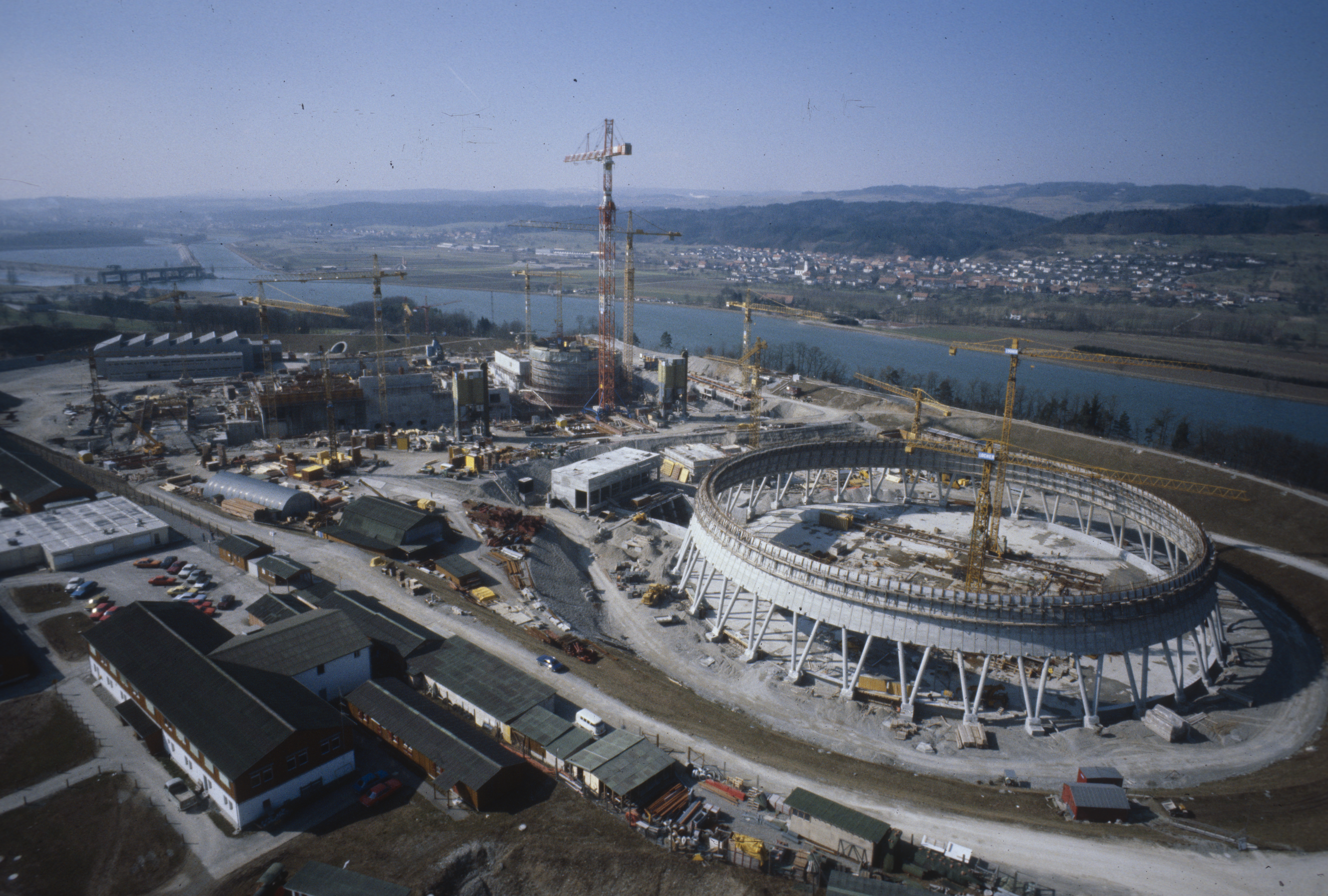
Under construction

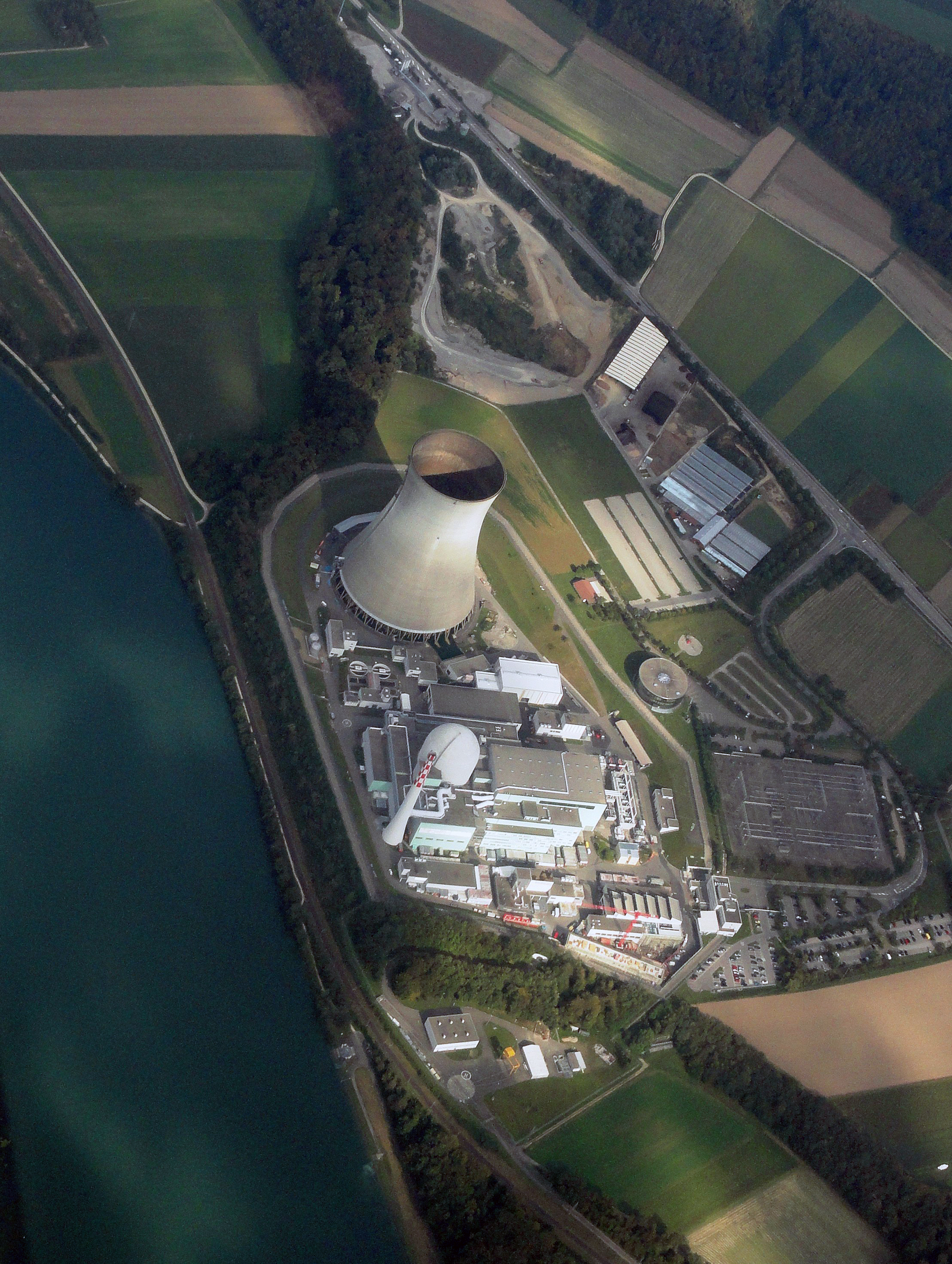
Aerial view without visible steam plume

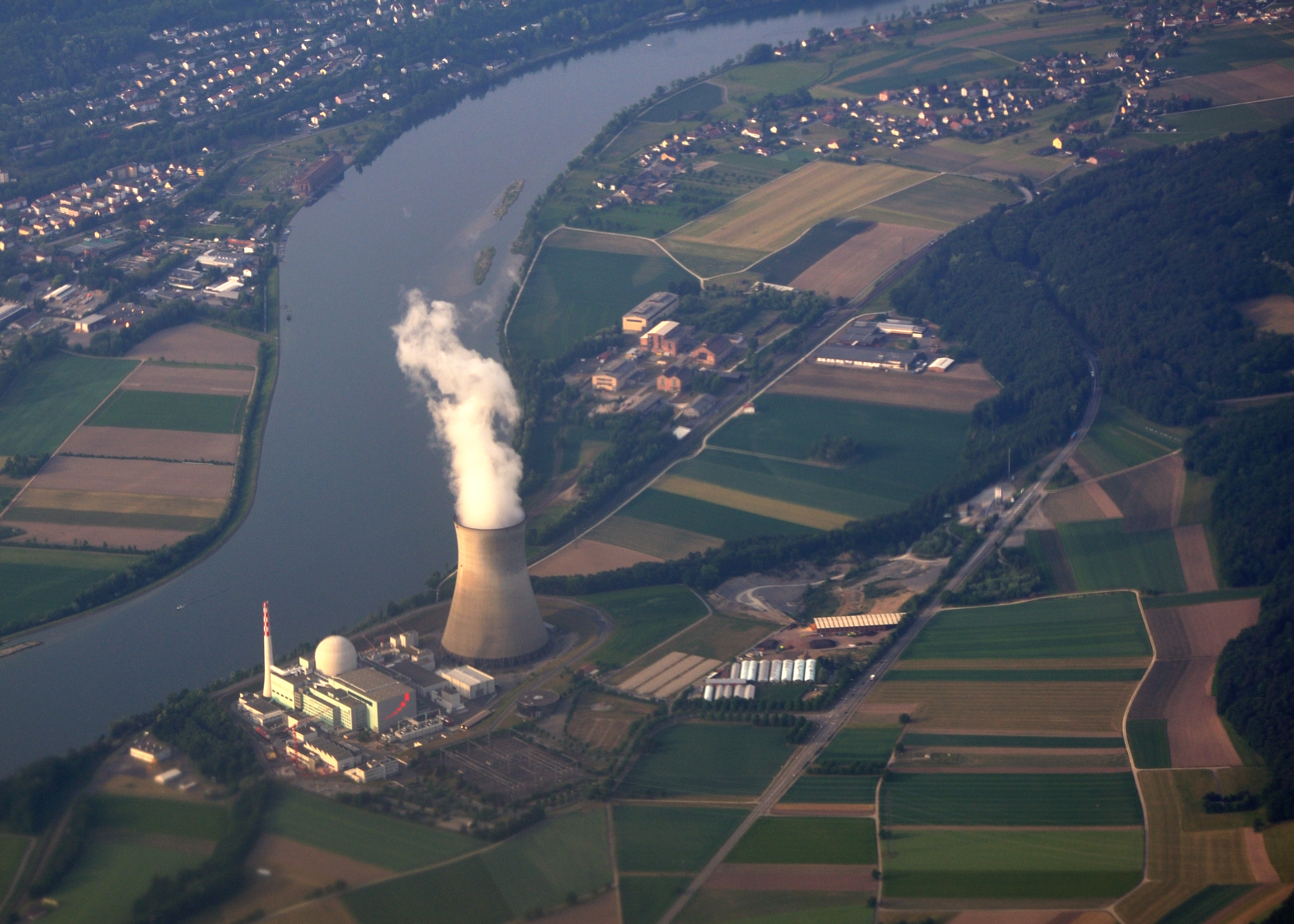
Aerial view 1

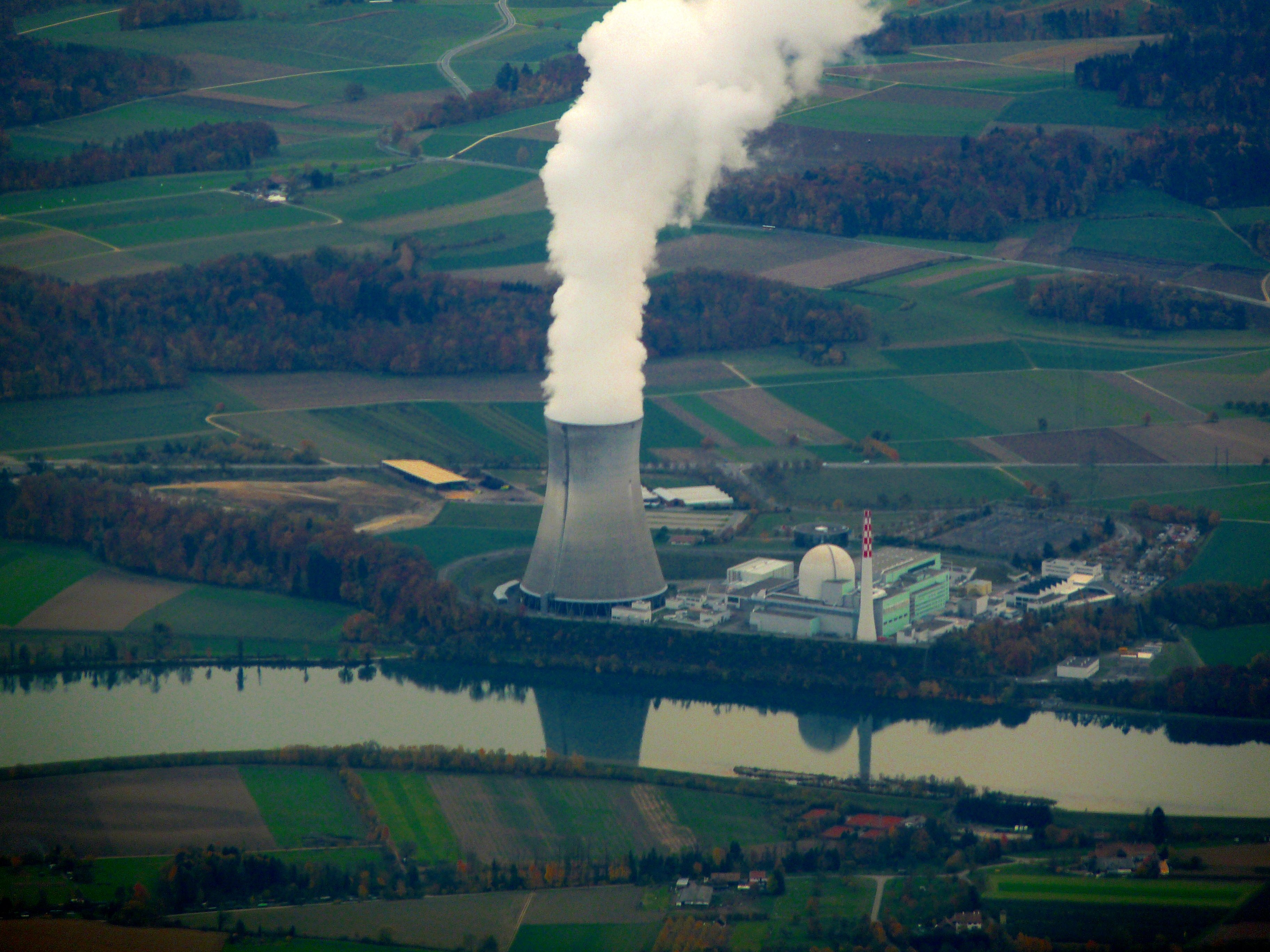
Aerial view 2

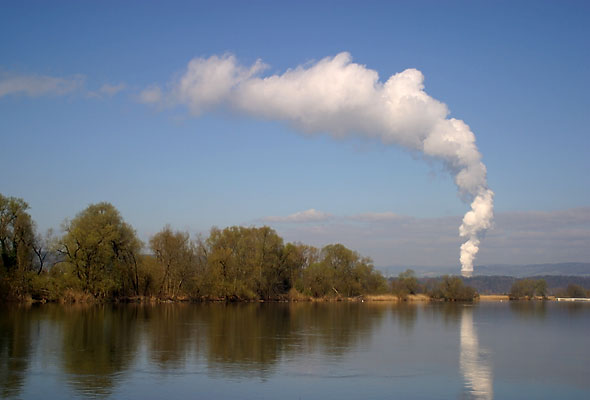
Klingnau reservoir in foreground

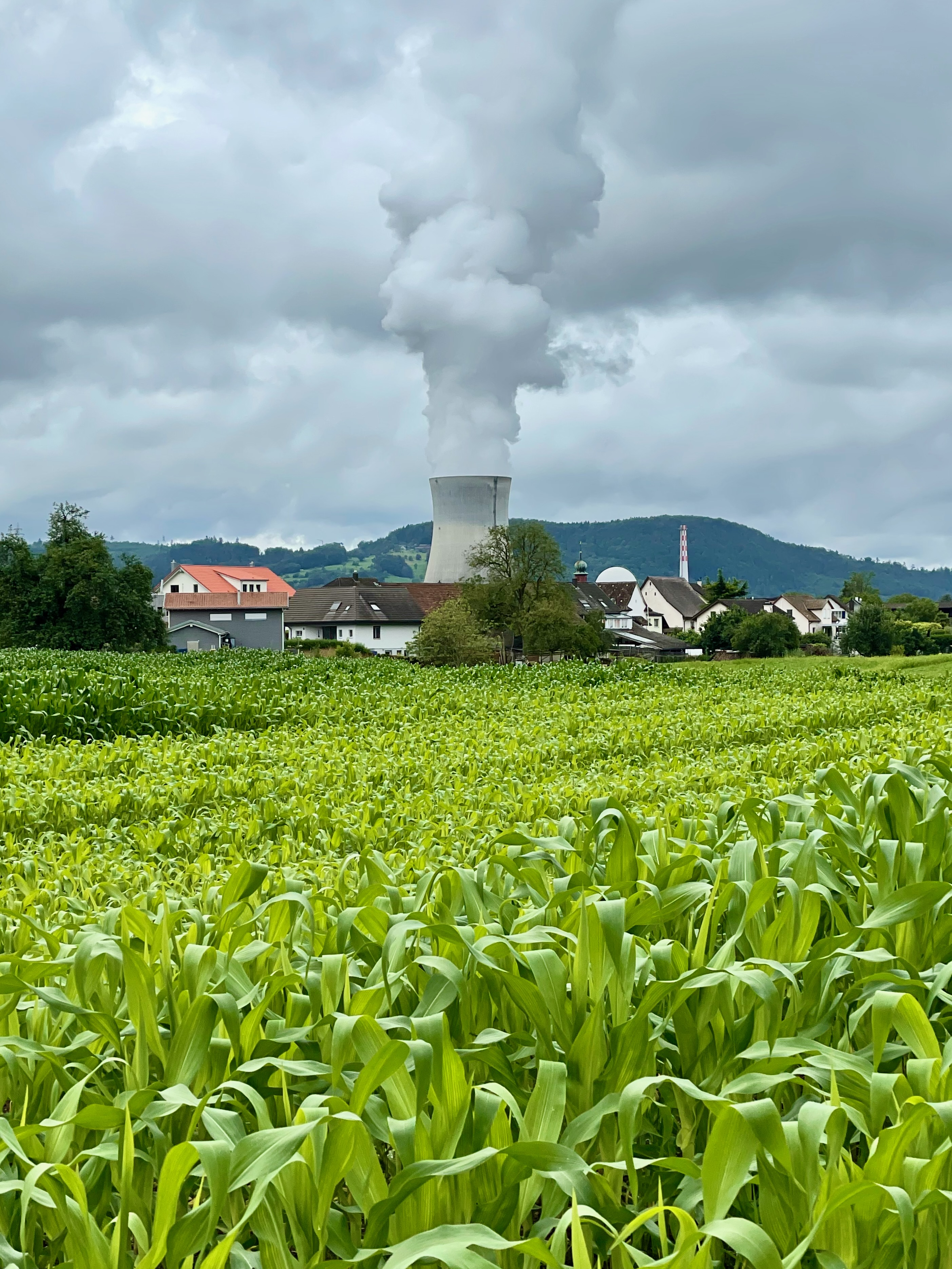
Village of Full and crop fields in foreground

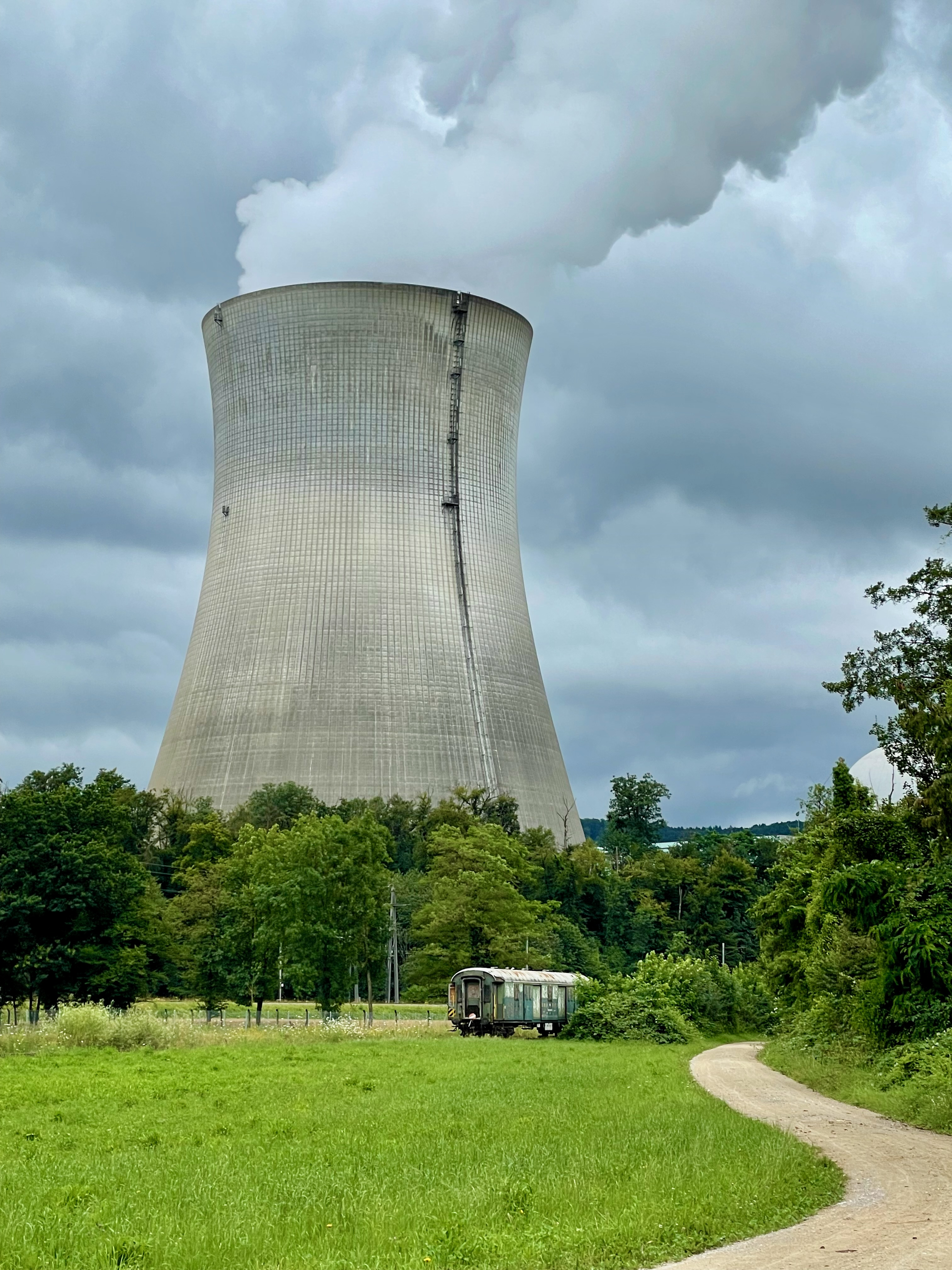
Cooling tower with old rail carriage in foreground

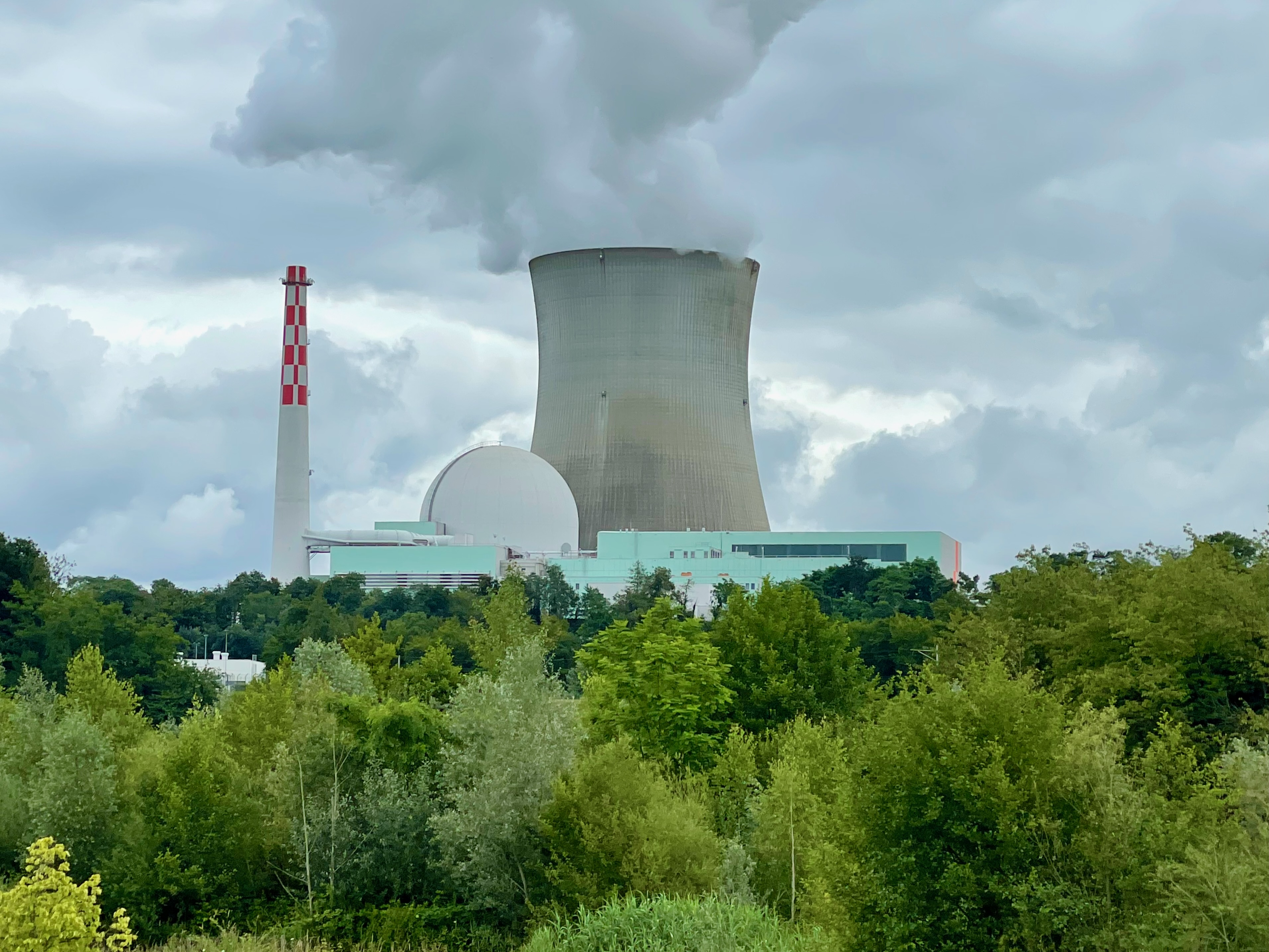
Cooling tower, reactor dome, and chimney

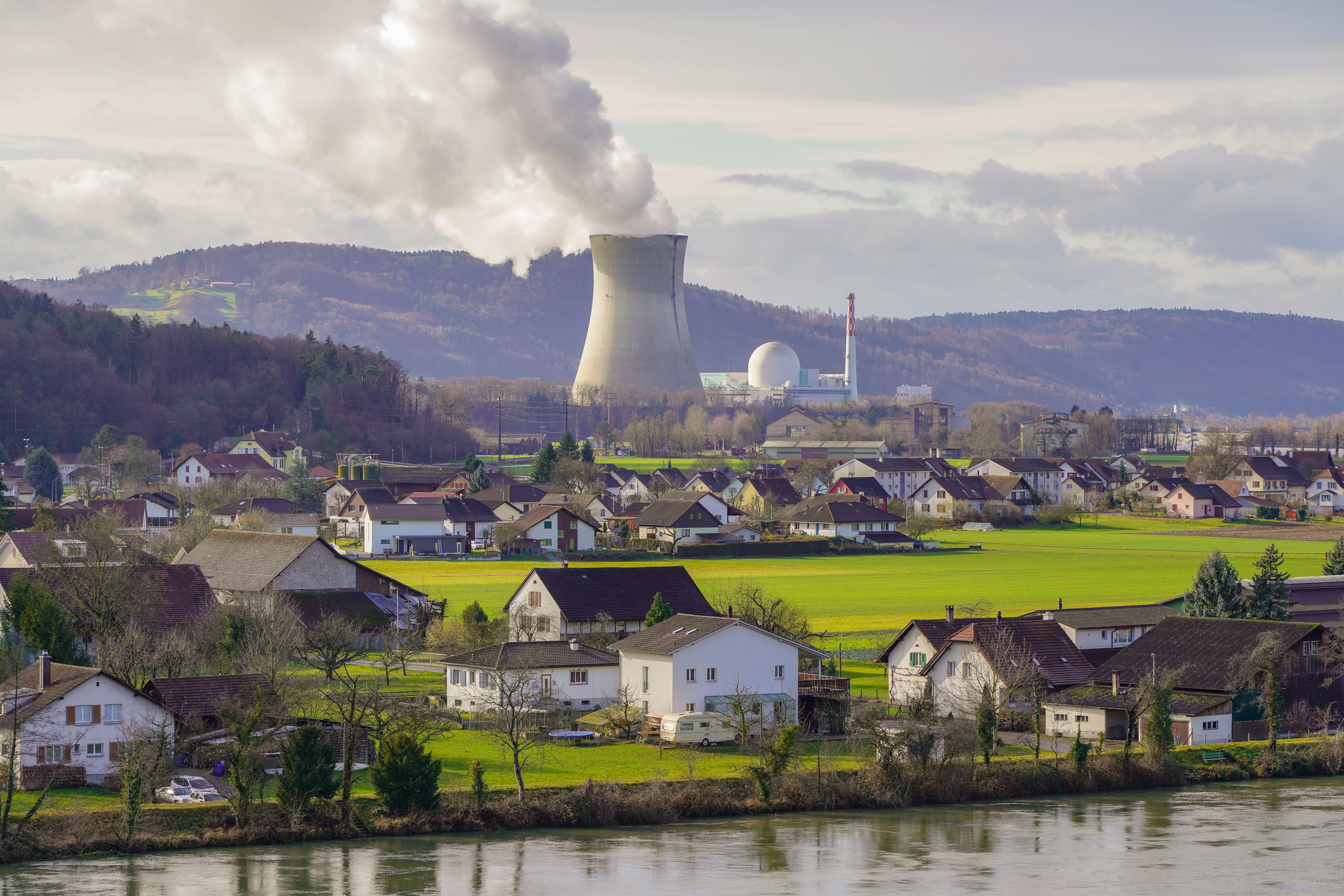
View from the across the Rhine river

== See also ==
- List of commercial nuclear reactors#Switzerland
- Nuclear power in Switzerland
