= Niederamt Nuclear Power Plant =

Nuclear power plant in Solothurn, Switzerland

Niederamt Nuclear Power Plant (KKN)
- Official name: Kernkraftwerk Niederamt
- Country: Switzerland
- Location: Niederamt, Canton of Solothurn between Olten and Aarau
- Coordinates: 47°21′57.4″N 7°58′27.2″E
- Status: Cancelled
- Owner: Kernkraftwerk Niederamt AG
- Operator: Kernkraftwerk Niederamt AG

Power generation
- Units planned: 1 (1,100–1,600 MW)

The Niederamt Nuclear Power Plant (in German Kernkraftwerk Niederamt, abbreviated to KKN and not to be confused with the similarly abbreviated Niederaichbach Nuclear Power Plant) was the name for a planned nuclear power plant near the existing Gösgen Nuclear Power Plant in Niederamt in the Canton of Solothurn between Olten and Aarau in Switzerland. The land earmarked for the project would have taken in some of the residential areas of Niedergösgen, Gretzenbach and Däniken.

== History ==
On 9 June 2008, the Kernkraftwerk Niederamt AG, a project company of Atel Holding AG, which now goes by the name of Alpiq Holding, submitted the general licence application to the Swiss Federal Office of Energy.

This is the first stage of the licensing procedure for a new nuclear power plant in Switzerland. The general licence application consists of six documents: the safety report; the environmental impact report; the security report on protection from external hazards; the demonstration of disposal feasibility; the concept for decommissioning, and the report on conformity with the land-use planning.

The general licence is issued by the Swiss Federal Council. Following the natural disasters in Japan, which resulted in the reactor accidents at the Fukushima nuclear power plant, on 14 March 2011, Federal Councillor Doris Leuthard suspended the general licensing procedures for the replacement of existing nuclear power plants. The project was not further pursued; the project company Kernkraftwerk Niederamt AG was formally dissolved in 2017. On January 1, 2018 an amendment (article 12a) to the Swiss Nuclear Energy Act (Kernenergiegesetz) came into effect, prohibiting the issuing of new general licences for nuclear power plants.

== Project information ==
The general licence application did not refer to any specific plant. It was based on a generic nuclear power plant of the third-generation designs available today with light water reactors (pressurised or boiling water reactors) but stopped short of specifying the actual make or manufacturer. The application was based on two output categories, 1100 megawatt and 1600 megawatt.

== See also ==
- Nuclear power in Switzerland
- List of nuclear reactors
- Kernkraftwerk Niederamt (German)
