= CROCUS =

Experimental nuclear reactor

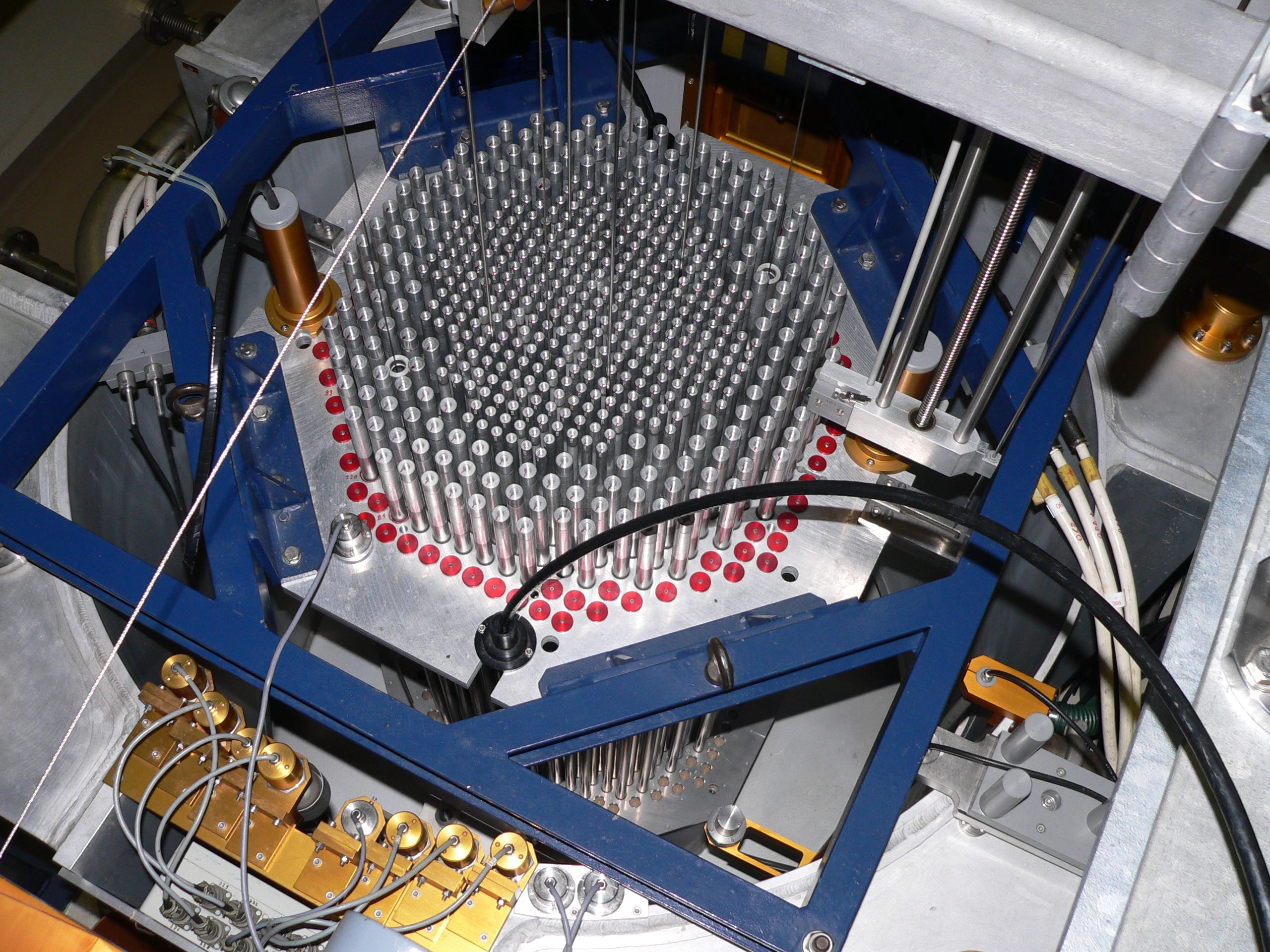
- CROCUS' core
- Operating institution: École Polytechnique Fédérale de Lausanne
- Coordinates: 46.521238°N 6.570361°E
- Power: 100 W (thermal)

Construction and upkeep
- Construction began: January 1, 1970
- First criticality: July 13, 1983
- Staff: 8
- Operators: 2

Technical specifications
- Max thermal flux: 7.5×10^{8} cm^{-2}s^{-1}
- Max fast flux: 1.75×10^{9} cm^{-2}s^{-1}
- Cooling: light water
- Neutron moderator: light water
- Neutron reflector: light water
- Control rods: 2

CROCUS is a research reactor at École Polytechnique Fédérale de Lausanne, a research institute and university in Lausanne, Switzerland.

The uranium nuclear reactor core is in an aluminium container that measures 130 centimetres (51 in) across with 1.2-centimetre (0.47 in)-thick walls. The aluminum vessel is filled with demineralized light water to serve as both a neutron moderator and a neutron reflector.

Power output is controlled either by adjusting the water level in the reactor—with a ±0.1-millimetre (0.0039 in) level of control, or with the adjustment of two boron carbide (B_{4}C) control rods—with a ±1-millimetre (0.039 in) level of finesse. The reactor has six separate safety systems: two cadmium shields and four storage tanks, any of which can shut down the reaction in less than a second.

CROCUS has a license to produce 100 watts (0.13 hp) or a neutron flux of ~2.5 × 10^{9} cm^{-2}s^{-1} at the core's center.

== See also ==
- Media related to CROCUS at Wikimedia Commons
