= 1962 Swiss referendums =

Four referendums were held in Switzerland in 1962. The first was held on 1 April on a popular initiative to ban nuclear weapons, and was rejected by 65% of voters. The second and third were held on 27 May on an amendment to the constitution regarding nature conservation and a federal law amending pay at the federal level. The constitutional amendment was approved, but the law on pay was rejected. The final referendum was held on 4 November on another constitutional amendment on the method of election of the National Council, and was approved by voters.

== Results ==
=== April: Nuclear weapon ban ===
Choice	Popular vote		Cantons		
Choice	Votes	%	Full	Half	Total
For	286,895	34.8	4	0	4
Against	537,138	65.2	15	6	18
Blank votes	14,003	–	–	–	–
Invalid votes	1,554	–	–	–	–
Total	839,590	100	19	6	22
Registered voters/turnout	1,510,038	55.6	–	–	–
Source: Nohlen & Stöver

=== May: Constitutional amendment on nature conservation ===
Choice	Popular vote		Cantons		
Choice	Votes	%	Full	Half	Total
For	442,559	79.1	19	6	22
Against	116,856	20.9	0	0	0
Blank votes	25,360	–	–	–	–
Invalid votes	582	–	–	–	–
Total	585,357	100	19	6	22
Registered voters/turnout	1,509,718	38.8	–	–	–
Source: Nohlen & Stöver

=== May: Pay at the federal level ===
Choice	Votes	%
For	176,737	31.7
Against	381,229	68.3
Blank votes	26,823	–
Invalid votes	726	–
Total	585,515	100
Registered voters/turnout	1,509,718	38.8
Source: Nohlen & Stöver

=== November: Constitutional amendment on the electoral system for the National Council ===
Choice	Popular vote		Cantons		
Choice	Votes	%	Full	Half	Total
For	331,059	63.7	13	6	16
Against	188,731	36.3	6	0	6
Blank votes	29,661	–	–	–	–
Invalid votes	1,016	–	–	–	–
Total	550,467	100	19	6	22
Registered voters/turnout	1,515,920	36.3	–	–	–
Source: Nohlen & Stöver
