= Lucens reactor =

Former nuclear reactor in Switzerland

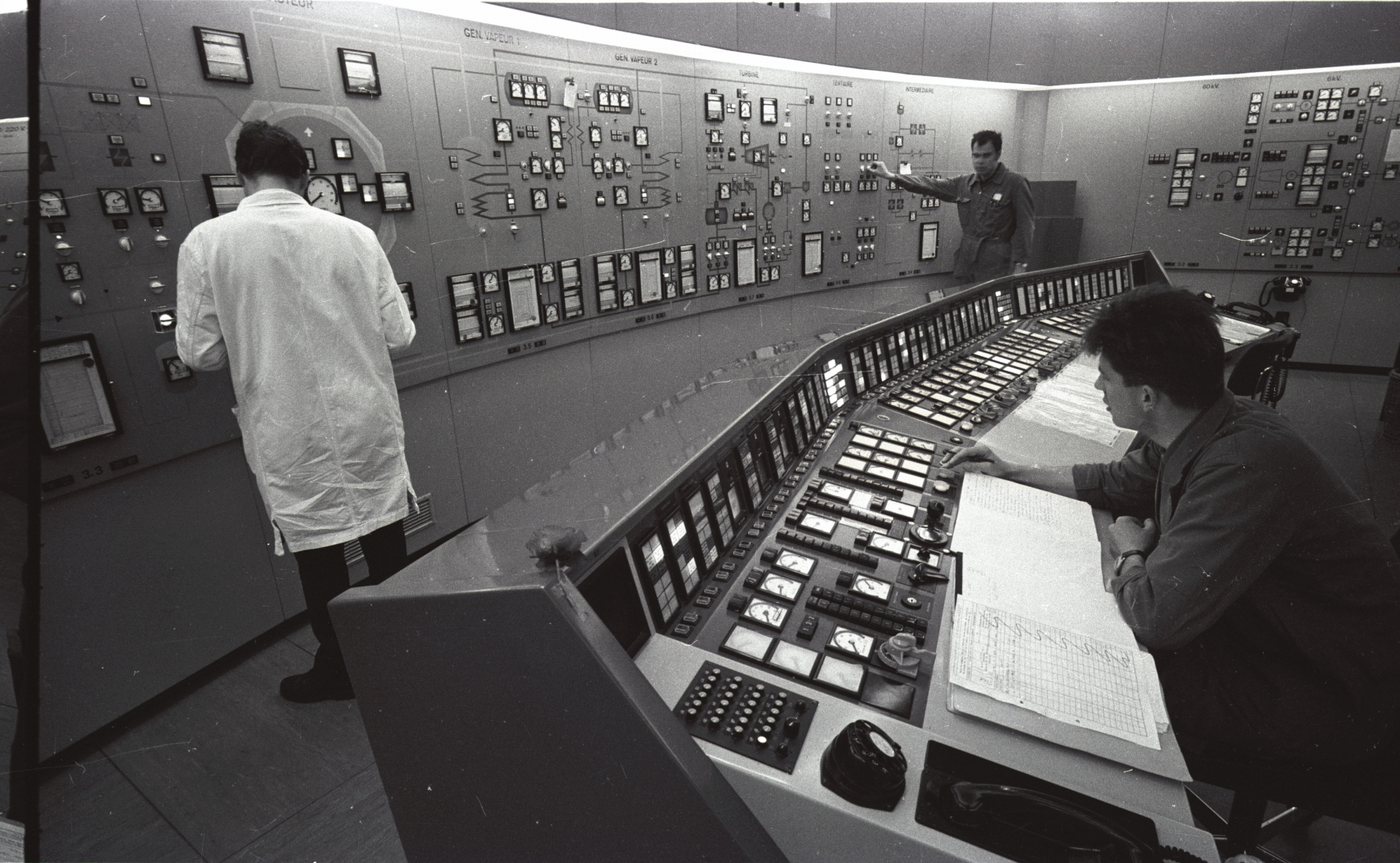
- Control room of the Lucens reactor in April 1968
- Official name: Versuchsatomkraftwerk Lucens
- Country: Switzerland
- Location: Lucens, Vaud
- Coordinates: 46°41′34.16″N 6°49′36.81″E
- Status: Decommissioned
- Construction began: 1 April 1962
- Commission date: 10 May 1968
- Decommission date: 3 March 1969
- Owner: Nationale Gesellschaft zur Förderung der industriellen Atomtechnik
- Operator: Energie Ouest Suisse

Nuclear power station
- Reactor type: HWGCR
- Reactor supplier: Thermatom
- Cooling source: Carbon dioxide

Power generation
- Units decommissioned: 1 x 6 MW
- Nameplate capacity: 6 MW

External links
- Commons: Related media on Commons
- Suffered a nuclear accident on 21 January 1969, leading to a partial core meltdown and significant radioactive contamination

Switzerland nuclear power plants (view)
Active plants
Closed plants

The Lucens reactor (officially in French: Centrale nucléaire expérimentale de Lucens (CNEL), in German: Versuchsatomkraftwerk Lucens (VAKL), lit. 'Lucens experimental nuclear power plant') was an experimental nuclear power reactor built next to Lucens, Vaud, Switzerland. After its connection to the electrical grid on 29 January 1968, the reactor only operated for a year before it suffered an accident on 21 January 1969. The cause was a corrosion-induced loss of heat dispersal leading to the destruction of a pressure tube which caused an adjacent pressure tube to fail, and partial meltdown of the core, resulting in radioactive contamination of the cavern.

== Background ==
After international breakthroughs in Nuclear technology after the Second World War the Swiss federal government sought to participate in this field as well. As a result it launched an extensive funding and research program. The main goal of this program was the construction of a Swiss made nuclear reactor.

In this context three industry groups were founded who applied for funding, each with their own project for a nuclear reactor. In September 1959 the Swiss Federal Council urged them to merge their projects and work together to develop a Swiss made experimental reactor, as a result the Nationale Gesellschaft zur Förderung der industriellen Atomtechnik (transl. National Society for the Promotion of Industrial Nuclear Technology, NGA) was founded.

To contribute to the funding of such projects the Federal Assembly passed a federal decree on 15 May 1960 that allowed the Federal Council to contribute up to 50 million Swiss francs to the construction and experimental operation of prototype power reactors.

In 1960 the Eidgenössische Kommission für die Sicherheit der Atomanlagen, transl. Federal Nuclear Safety Commission was founded to oversee the new nuclear reactors.

== Construction and early operation ==
In May 1962, the definitive decision to build was made and construction started later the same year on 1 April. In the following five years the experimental reactor was constructed near the town of Lucens. The reactor, turbine and fuel rod storage were built into three different caverns for security reasons.

The reactor became critical for the first time on 29 December 1966. During 1967 diverse commissioning attempts as well as completion and improvement work took place. Beginning in early 1968, the reactor's power output was increased in stages until it was tested in a ten-day endurance test in April/ May. With the test the reactor's construction and testing phase was completed and in 1968 the finished reactor was handed over to Energie Ouest Suisse (EOS), the operator of the reactor. The EOS then operated the reactor between mid-August and late October 1968 continuously in a provisional configuration. Operations were then suspended to allow repairs and technical modifications.

== Design ==
The heavy-water moderated, carbon dioxide gas-cooled pressure tube reactor produced 28 megawatts (MW) of heat, which was used to generate 6 MW of electricity. It consisted out of 73 fuel rods, each in their own carbon dioxide filled pressure tube. The tubes were housed within a moderator tank filled with heavy water. Since enriched uranium at the time was only available in the US and Switzerland sought to remain independent the reactor was designed to use natural uranium as fuel, which at the time was hoped to be sourceable in Switzerland as well. It was fueled by 0.96% natural uranium alloyed with chromium cased in magnesium alloy (magnesium with 0.6% zirconium) inserted into a graphite matrix. Carbon dioxide gas was pumped into the top of the channels at 6.28 megapascals (MPa) and 223 °C and exited the channels at a pressure of 5.79 MPa and at a temperature of 378 °C.

== 1969 nuclear accident ==
On 21 January 1969, the reactor was started for regular operation when it suffered a loss-of-coolant accident, leading to a partial core meltdown and the radioactive contamination of the cavern, which was then sealed. The meltdown was caused by water entering the pressure tubes, where it corroded the magnesium tubes. The resulting corrosion products accumulated in some fuel channels, restricting the flow of the CO_{2} cooling gas in them, inhibiting the cooling of the fuel, causing it to overheat, catch fire and partially melt. No irradiation of workers or the population occurred, though the reactor's cavern was seriously contaminated.

Using the criteria of the International Nuclear Event Scale (INES), introduced in 1990, the event has been assessed between level 4, "Accident with local consequences" and level 5, "Accident with wider consequences".

=== Lead-up ===
Starting on 24 October 1968, the reactor went into maintenance during which its cooling system was improved, with work continuing for several months.

One month before the accident the federal government issued the permanent operating license on 23 December 1968. The Swiss nuclear safety commission found that the reactor's fuel elements were potentially vulnerable to malfunction and supported the manufacturers recommendation that the reactor should be operated avoiding thermal fluctuation.

On 21 January the reactor was supposed to start its definitive regular operation.

=== Detailed Timeline ===
The operators began starting the reactor at 04:00 in the morning. It subsequently became critical at 04:23 following startup. Over the day, the power was increased gradually and reached a thermal power output of 12 MW at 17:14. However, due to a blockage of the pressure tube, insufficient CO_{2} was supplied to the fuel element to cool it effectively. Consequently, fuel element number 59 started to overheat, which remained unnoticed as it lacked a temperature sensor. After heating up sufficiently, the magnesium casing and the uranium started to melt, which also spread to neighboring fuel elements. Eventually, the metals ignited, leading to a significant contamination of the CO_{2}. This finally triggered an automatic reactor scram at 17:20, simultaneously sealing the ventilation system. This, however, did not prevent the fuel element from burning, which led to the graphite encasing of the fuel elements to soften and bend. This resulted in the surrounding pressure tube bursting, damaging the reactor's moderator tank. As a consequence heavy water, molten uranium and magnesium, and contaminated CO_{2} were ejected into the cavern. The now mixed heavy water and metal chemically reacted, leading to a second explosion. These explosions further damaged the reactor and moderator tank, leading to further leakage of radioactive elements. At 17:58, operators switched the ventilation system to the emergency exhaust system, which was equipped with iodine filters to reduce radioactive contamination of the surroundings. Operators began wearing gas masks at 18:15 before shutting down the ventilation system at 18:20.

== Decontamination and dismantling ==
On 3 March 1969 the radioactivity in the reactor cavern has subsided to such an extent it could be entered for prolonged time periods for the first time. The decontamination and dismantling could begin. Over the next one and a half years the cavern was decontaminated, and the reactor was beginning to be dismantled. In September 1970 the 72 remaining intact fuel rods were starting to be extracted. At the end of 1974 the decontamination and dismantling was completed. The plant was decommissioned in 1988. Between 1991 and 1993 the reactor cavern and further parts were sealed off with concrete and in April of 1995 the federal council released the site, except for a small patch where the remaining waste was stored, from oversight and cleared it for other use. The last radioactive waste was removed in 2003 with very little remaining lying buried in the concrete filled reactor, leading to the federal council also clearing the last patch. A removal is not planned.

== Investigation ==
Directly after the accident, public attention remained limited, and the event generated little controversy, even among Lucens residents and political officials. According to historians, this reflected the public's acceptance of nuclear energy at the time.

In 1979 the Kommission für die Untersuchung des Zwischenfalles im Versuchs-Atomkraftwerk Lucens (transl. Commission for the Investigation of the incident at the Lucens experimental nuclear power plant) published its final report.

The investigation determined that the primary cause of the accident was a malfunction of the gaskets of the circulation fan of the coolant, that allowed water to enter the reactor.

== Site today ==
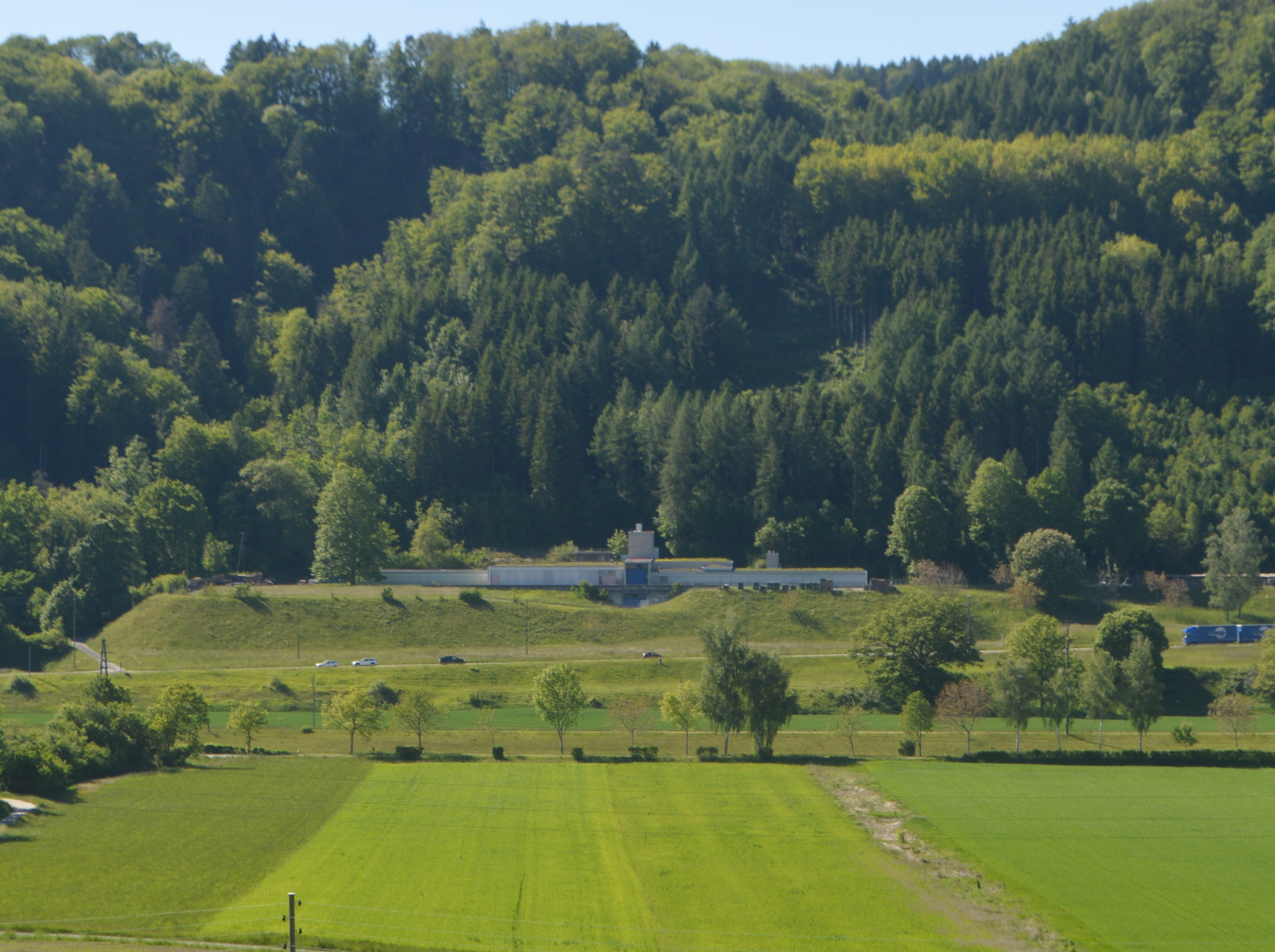
The reactor site in 2021

After being decommissioned and released from observation the canton of Vaud bought the remaining parts and from 1995 to 1998 has renovated and transformed them into a warehouse for the Vaud State Archives, the cantonal Museums as well as the university library. It officially opened on 9 October 1997.

Although not being under observation as a nuclear site, the Federal Office of Public Health still regularly conducts measurements of the water coming from the drainage pipe of the reactor cavern.

== See also ==
- Nuclear power in Switzerland
- List of civilian nuclear accidents
