= Zwilag =

Radioactive waste repository in Switzerland

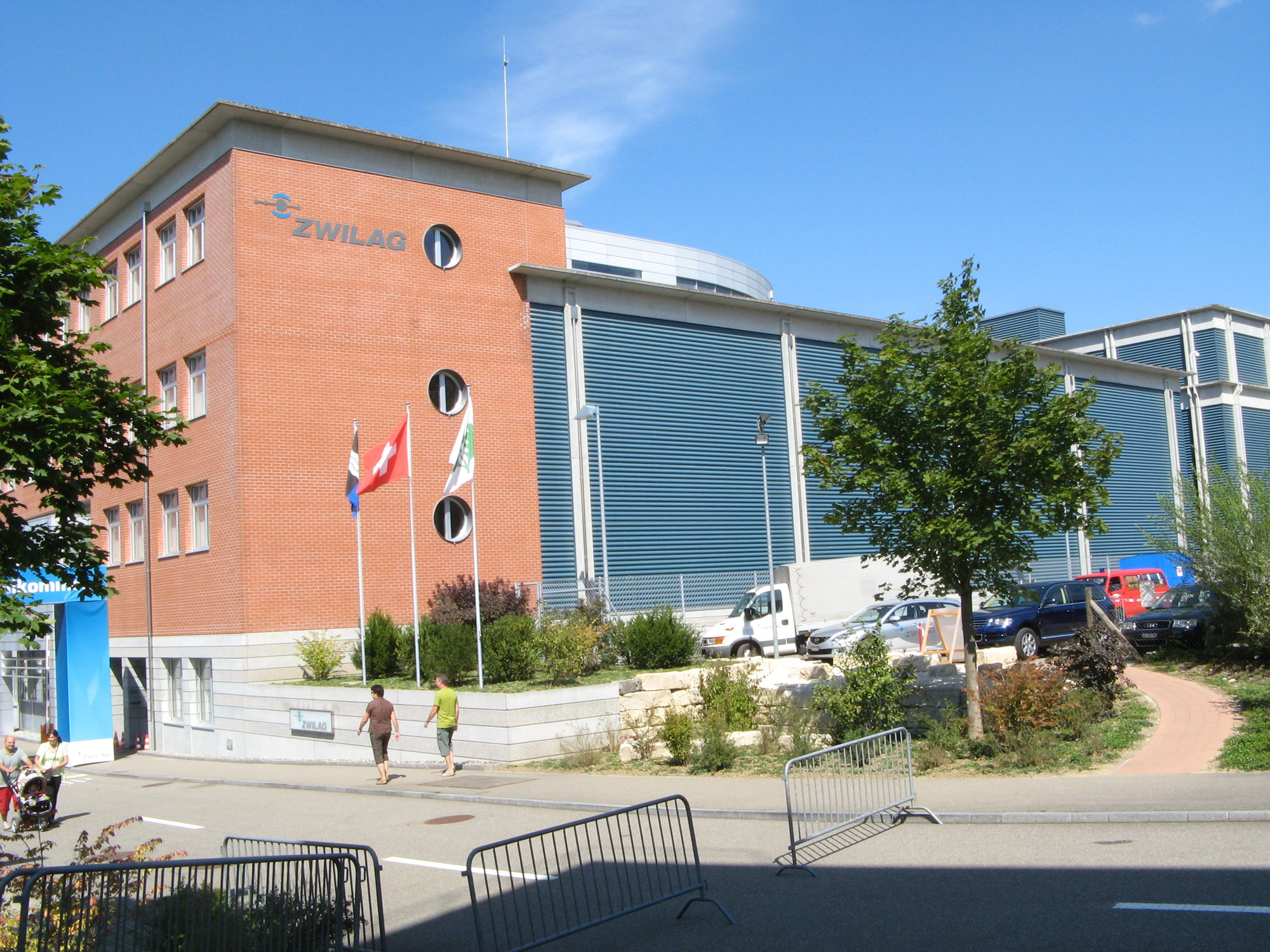
Zwilag Building

Zwilag is an interim storage facility for all categories of radioactive waste from nuclear power plants in Switzerland. It is located next to the Paul Scherrer Institute (PSI) site in Würenlingen. The operating company Zwischenlager Würenlingen AG was registered as a stock corporation in 1990 in the commercial register. It belongs to the Swiss nuclear power plant operating companies, proportionately to the output of the nuclear power plants.

The interim storage facility consists of a warehouse for spent fuel elements and glazed high-level radioactive waste containing a hall for long-life medium-level radioactive waste and a hall for low-level and medium-level radioactive waste. The first fuel assemblies were delivered in July 2001, the first glass molds arriving in December 2001. The interim storage facility also has special facilities for the treatment of low-level radioactive waste, including a conditioning system for sorting mixed waste, compacting, treating liquid waste and cementing, as well as a new type of plasma melting system, Plasmarc, so that it is suitable for final storage.

Next to it is the federal interim storage facility for radioactive waste from medicine, industry and research, which is operated by PSI. In May 2014 it was announced that the capacity of the federal interim storage facility had been exhausted by 85 percent. To date, 5000 barrels and 120 containers of radioactive waste have been stored there.

In 2016 the repatriation of the reprocessing incurred (WA) of spent fuel Swiss radioactive waste from La Hague and Sellafield was completed. In the Zwilag, the highly active glazed waste is now stored in 23 castor containers and the compact, medium - active waste in 552 individual containers (e.g. drums). The contents of these containers were one of the subjects of decades of fierce debate about the WA with the nuclear power plant opposition SNSI receiving critical comments from the Federation for the Environment and Nature Conservation.
