= Würenlingen =

- Municipality
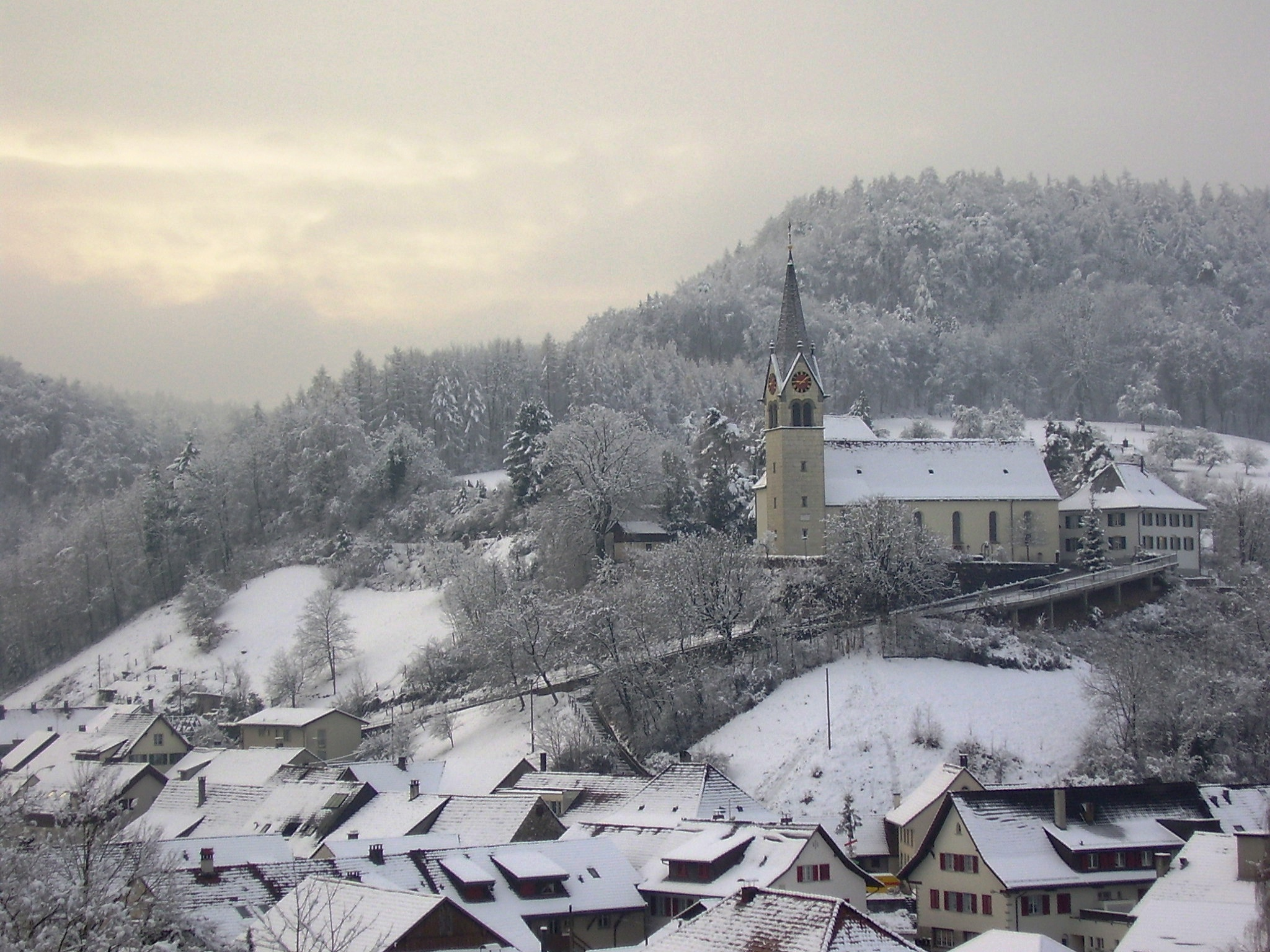

- Flag Coat of arms
- Location of Würenlingen
- Location within Switzerland Location within Canton of Aargau
- Coordinates: 47°32′N 8°16′E
- Country: Switzerland
- Canton: Aargau
- District: Baden

Area
  - Total: 9.37 km^{2} (3.62 sq mi)
- Elevation: 370 m (1,210 ft)

Population (December 2020)
  - Total: 4,838
  - Density: 516/km^{2} (1,340/sq mi)
- Time zone: UTC+01:00 (CET)
  - Summer (DST): UTC+02:00 (CEST)
- Postal code: 5303
- SFOS number: 4047
- ISO 3166 code: CH-AG
- Surrounded by: Böttstein, Döttingen, Endingen, Obersiggenthal, Tegerfelden, Untersiggenthal, Villigen
- Twin towns: Beringen (Switzerland)
- Website: www.wuerenlingen.ch

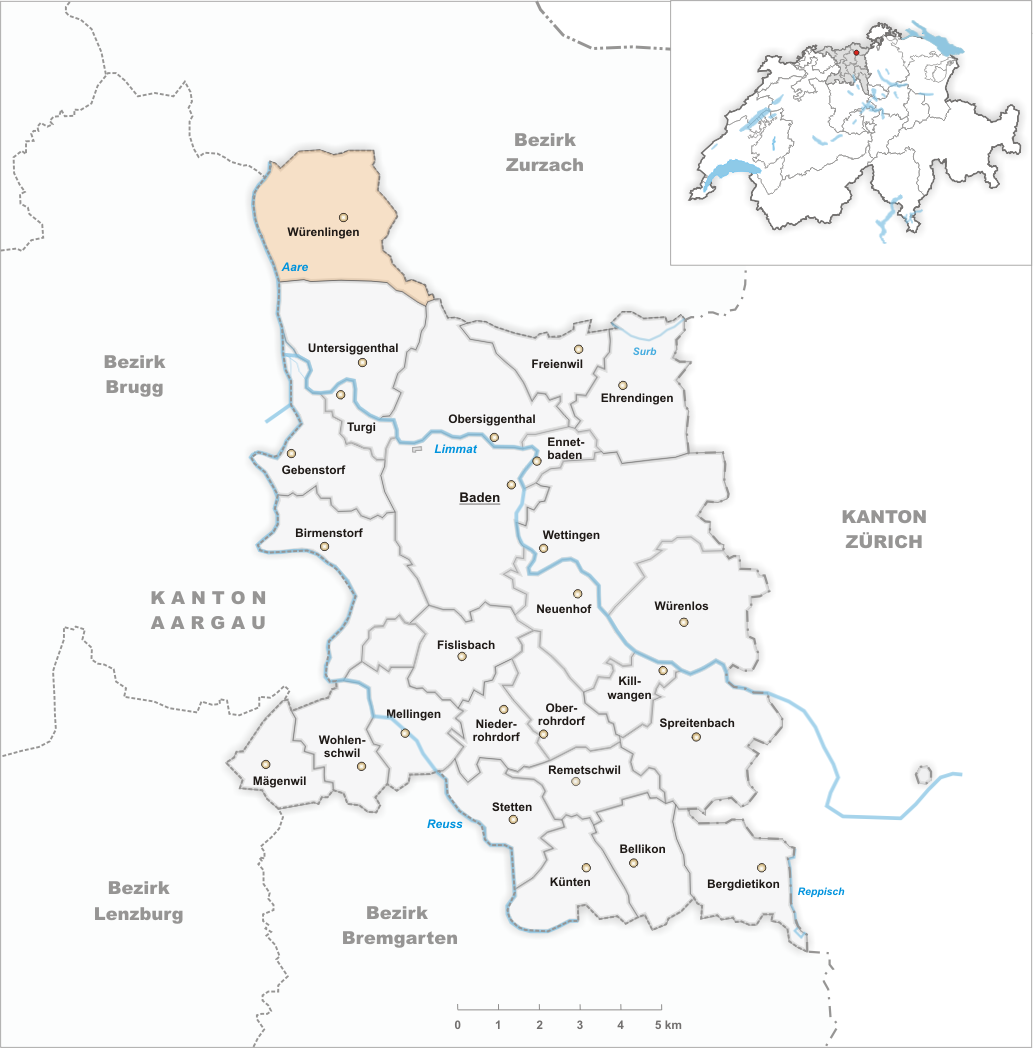
Würenlingen

Würenlingen is a municipality in the district of Baden in the canton of Aargau in Switzerland.

== Geography ==
Aerial view (1964)

Würenlingen has an area, as of 2006, of 9.4 square kilometers (3.6 sq mi). Of this area, 29.2% is used for agricultural purposes, while 49.4% is forested. Of the rest of the land, 19.2% is settled (buildings or roads) and the remainder (2.2%) is non-productive (rivers or lakes).

== Coat of arms ==
The blazon of the municipal coat of arms is Argent an Acorn slipped and leaved of two Vert.

== Demographics ==
Würenlingen had a population (on 31 December 2020) of 4,838. In 2008, 21.6% of the population were made foreign nationals. Over the last 10 years the population has grown at a rate of 9%. Most of the population in 2000, speaks German (88.5%), with Albanian being second most common (2.8%) and Italian being third ( 2.0%).

The age distribution as of 2008, in Würenlingen is; 426 children or 10.5% of the population are between 0 and 9 years old and 514 teenagers or 12.7% are between 10 and 19. Of the adult population, 550 people or 13.6% of the population are between 20 and 29 years old. 513 people or 12.7% are between 30 and 39, 754 people or 18.6% are between 40 and 49, and 533 people or 13.2% are between 50 and 59. The senior population distribution is 378 people or 9.3% of the population are between 60 and 69 years old, 239 people or 5.9% are between 70 and 79, there are 124 people or 3.1% who are between 80 and 89, and there are 15 people or 0.4% who are 90 and older.

Historical population
Year	Pop.	±%
1975	2,645	—
1980	2,784	+5.3%
1990	3,082	+10.7%
2000	3,644	+18.2%
2010	4,241	+16.4%
2014	4,455	+5.0%

In 2000, there were 108 homes with 1 or 2 persons in the household, 638 homes with 3 or 4 persons in the household, and 604 homes with 5 or more persons in the household. The average number of people per household was 2.57 individuals. In 2008, there were 742 single family homes (or 42.5% of the total) out of a total of 1,745 homes and apartments. There were a total of 24 empty apartments for a 1.4% vacancy rate. In 2007, the construction rate of new housing units was 3.4 new units per 1000 residents.

In the 2007 federal election the most popular party was the SVP which received 39% of the vote. The next three most popular parties were the CVP (26.3%), the SP (11.9%) and the FDP (10.9%).

In Würenlingen about 76.9% of the population (between age 25–64) have completed either non-mandatory upper secondary education or additional higher education (either university or a Fachhochschule). Of the school age population (in the 2008/2009 school year), there are 353 students attending primary school, there are 123 students attending secondary school in the municipality.

== Sights ==
The village of Würenlingen is designated as part of the Inventory of Swiss Heritage Sites.

== Economy ==
As of 2007, Würenlingen had an unemployment rate of 1.64%. As of 2005, there were 68 people employed in the primary economic sector and about 15 businesses involved in this sector. One thousand one hundred and sixty five people are employed in the secondary sector and there are 57 businesses in this sector. Six hundred and seven people are employed in the tertiary sector, with 93 businesses in this sector.

As of 2000, there was a total of 1,939 workers who lived in the municipality. Of these, 1,342 or about 69.2% of the residents worked outside Würenlingen while 1,399 people commuted into the municipality for work. There were a total of 1,996 jobs (of at least 6 hours per week) in the municipality. Of the working population, 14.2% used public transportation to get to work, and 53% used a private car.

== Religion ==
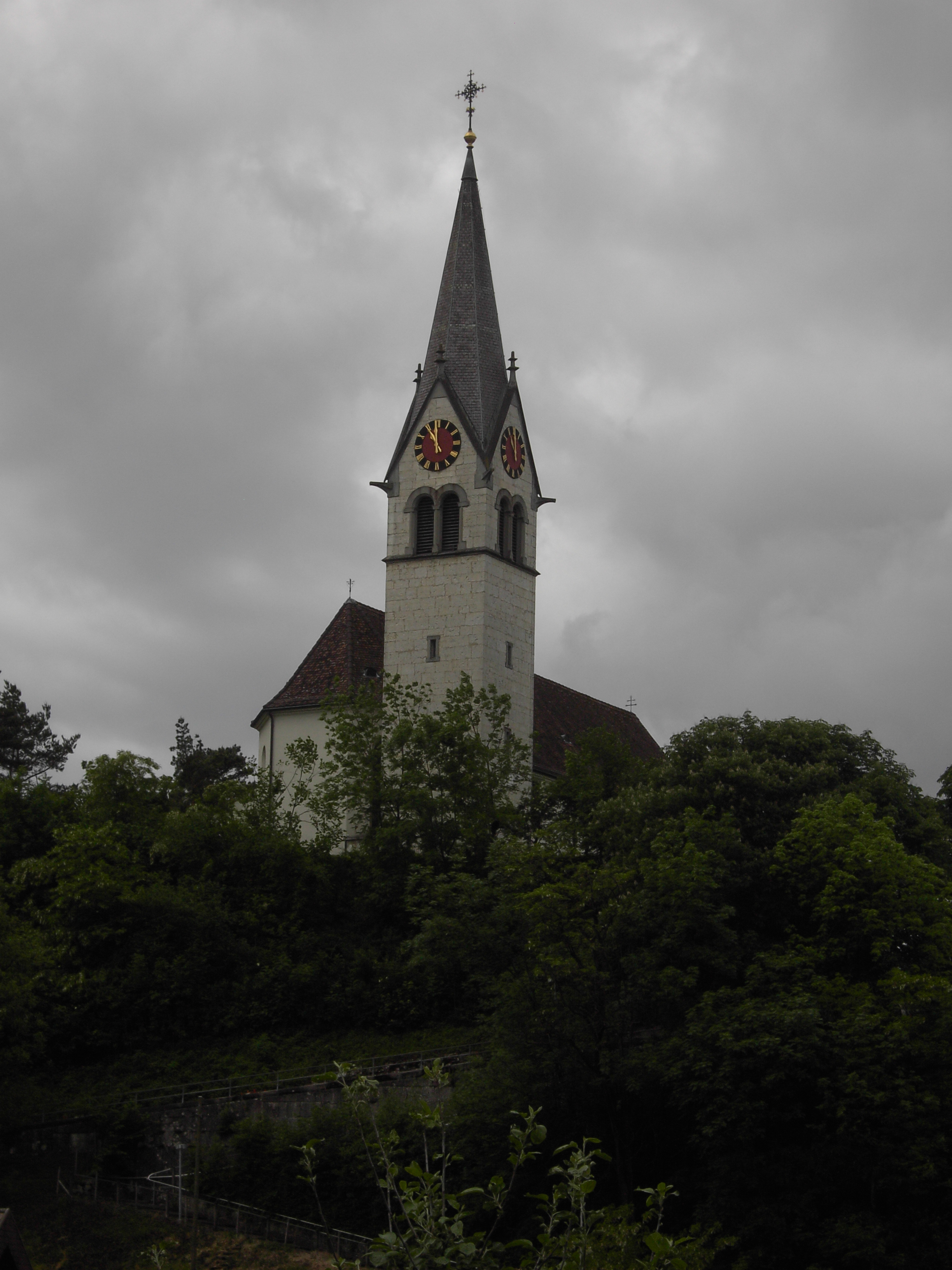
Roman Catholic Church of Würenlingen

From the 2000 census, 2,150 or 59.0% are Roman Catholic, while 750 or 20.6% belonged to the Swiss Reformed Church. Of the rest of the population, there are 4 individuals (or about 0.11% of the population) who belong to the Christian Catholic faith.

== Swissair Flight 330 ==
On 21 February 1970, a bomb placed by Palestinian terrorists was detonated on Swissair Flight 330. The flight crashed at Würenlingen, killing all 47 passengers and crew.

== Shootings ==
Würenlingen has had multiple shootings. In 1985, Alfredo Lardelli, a Swiss entrepreneur, shot the husband of his former wife and two prostitutes. He was sentenced to twenty years in prison and became a Swiss media personality thereafter. In 2015, a 36-year-old man killed his parents and brother-in-law, as well as their neighbour, before committing suicide.
