= Anaxam =

Company in Switzerland

ANAXAM
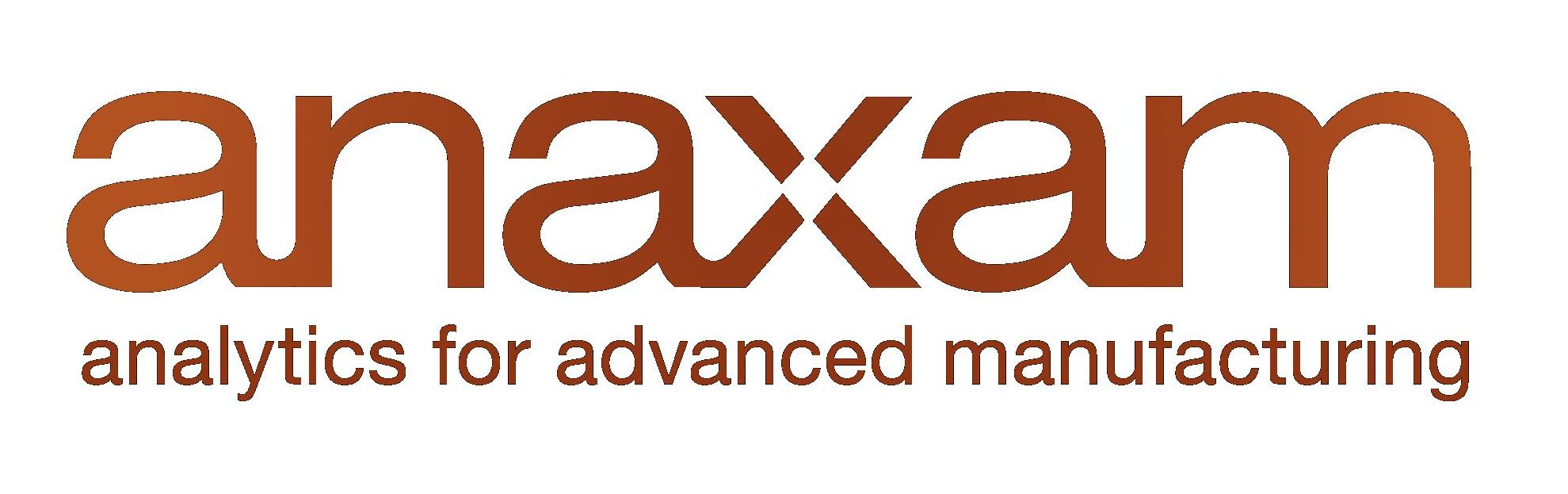
- Company type: Registered association
- Industry: Research, Services, Material analytics
- Founded: May 13, 2019; 6 years ago
- Headquarters: Villigen, Switzerland
- Key people: Christian Grünzweig (CEO), Frithjof Nolting (President)
- Website: anaxam.ch/en

ANAXAM stands for "Analytics with Neutrons And X-rays for Advanced Manufacturing" and it is a knowledge and technology transfer centre in Switzerland. Anaxam is located on the Park Innovaare campus in the canton of Aargau. It is a non-profit organisation.

The centre provides industry with materials analysis using neutron and synchrotron radiation (X-rays) in the field of non-destructive material testing. The technologies offered support companies in the optimisation of processes and products as well as in quality control and quality assurance.

Amongst others, ANAXAM uses the large-scale research facilities of the Paul Scherrer Institute (PSI) – particularly the Swiss Spallation Neutron Source (SINQ) and the Swiss Light Source (SLS).

== Structure ==
The legal form of Anaxam is a Swiss association. It was founded in 2019 by the Paul Scherrer Institute, the University of Applied Sciences Northwestern Switzerland (FHNW), the Swiss Nanoscience Institute and the canton of Aargau. The technology transfer centre is funded by the State Secretariat for Education, Research and Innovation (SERI). Basic funding comes from federal and cantonal funds. The association is also financed by income from its activities, contributions from supporting members, contributions and donations from private partners, donations from other organisations with similar goals and contributions in kind from public administrations, universities, research institutes and private partners.
