= Hybrid pixel detector =

Type of ionizing radiation

Hybrid pixel detectors are a type of ionizing radiation detector consisting of an array of diodes based on semiconductor technology and their associated electronics. The term "hybrid" stems from the fact that the two main elements from which these devices are built, the semiconductor sensor and the readout chip (also known as application-specific integrated circuit or ASIC), are manufactured independently and later electrically coupled by means of a bump-bonding process. Ionizing particles are detected as they produce electron-hole pairs through their interaction with the sensor element, usually made of doped silicon or cadmium telluride. The readout ASIC is segmented into pixels containing the necessary electronics to amplify and measure the electrical signals induced by the incoming particles in the sensor layer.

Hybrid pixel detectors made to operate in single-photon mode are known as Hybrid Photon Counting Detectors (HPCDs). These detectors are designed to count the number of hits within a certain time interval. They have become a standard in most synchrotron light sources and X-ray detection applications.

== History ==
The first hybrid pixel detectors were developed in the 1980s and '90s for high energy particle physics experiments at CERN. Since then, many large collaborations have continued to develop and implement these detectors into their systems, such as the ATLAS, CMS and ALICE experiments at the Large Hadron Collider. Using silicon pixel detectors as part of their inner tracking systems, these experiments are able to determine the trajectory of particles produced during the high-energy collisions that they study.

The key innovation for the construction of such large area pixel detectors was the separation of the sensor and the electronics into independent layers. Given that particle sensors require high resistivity silicon, while the readout electronics requires low resistivity, the introduction of the hybrid design allowed to optimize each element individually and later couple them together through a bump-bonding process involving microscopic spot soldering.

It was soon realized that the same hybrid technology could be used for the detection of X-ray photons. By the end of the 1990s the first hybrid photon counting (HPC) detectors developed by CERN and PSI were tested with synchrotron radiation. Further developments at CERN resulted in the creation of the Medipix chip and its variations.

The first large-area HPC detector was built in 2003 at PSI based on the PILATUS readout chip. The second generation of this detector, with improved readout electronics and smaller pixels, became the first HPC detector to operate routinely at a synchrotron.

In 2006, the company DECTRIS was founded as a spin-off from PSI and successfully commercialized the PILATUS technology. Since then, detectors based on the PILATUS and EIGER systems have been widely used for small-angle scattering, coherent scattering, X-ray powder diffraction and spectroscopy applications. The main reasons for the success of HPC detectors are the direct detection of individual photons and the accurate determination of scattering and diffraction intensities over a wide dynamic range.

== See also ==
- Semiconductor detector
- Microstrip detector
- Medipix
- PILATUS (detector)
