= Chicane (disambiguation) =

A chicane is an artificial feature creating extra turns in a road.

Chicane may also refer to:

- a bridge hand that is void of trumps
- Chicane (musician), (born Nicholas Bracegirdle), British electronic music artist
- Magnetic chicane, used to compress an electron bunch in a free-electron laser
- Mark Winter, a New Zealand cartoonist with the pen name Chicane
- Gender-neutral term of Chicano
