= Hugo Rietveld =

Dutch programmer and crystallographer

- Born: 7 March 1932; The Hague, Netherlands
- Died: 16 July 2016 (aged 84)
- Education: University of Western Australia
- Known for: Rietveld refinement
- Scientific career
- Institutions: Energy Research Centre of the Netherlands
- Doctoral advisor: Edward Norman Maslen
- Other academic advisors: Dorothy Hodgkin

Hugo M. Rietveld (7 March 1932 – 16 July 2016) was a Dutch crystallographer who is famous for single handedly publishing joint work of Loopstra, van Laar and himself on the full profile refinement method in powder diffraction, which became later known as the Rietveld refinement method. The method was developed by Loopstra and van Laar and programmed in Algol by Rietveld to refine neutron diffraction data, but is applicable to other diffraction experiments as well, like X-ray diffraction. The Rietveld refinement uses a least squares approach to refine a theoretical line profile (calculated from a known or postulated crystal structure) until it matches the measured profile. The introduction of this technique which used the full profile instead of individual reflections was a significant step forward in the diffraction analysis of powder samples.

== Biography ==
Rietveld was born in the Hague. After completing Grammar School in the Netherlands he moved to Australia and studied physics at the University of Western Australia in Perth. In 1964 he obtained his PhD degree under Edward Norman Maslen with a thesis entitled "The Structure of p-Diphenylbenzene and Other Compounds", a single crystal neutron and X-ray diffraction study. Dorothy Hodgkin was an external examiner on his thesis. This investigation was the first single crystal neutron diffraction study in Australia and was conducted at the High Flux Australian Reactor (HIFAR) in the Lucas Heights suburb of Sydney.

In 1964 he became a research officer at the Energy Research Centre of the Netherlands (Energieonderzoek Centrum Nederland, ECN) in Petten, where he worked together with Bert Loopstra and Bob van Laar on the structure solution and refinement of uranates and other ceramic compounds using neutron powder diffraction. In 1967 he implemented the full profile refinement method in a computer program, which he published as his own achievement under his own name in his 1969 citation classic. After publishing this important project alone, Rietveld found his position in the small Petten group increasingly difficult. In 1974 he successfully applied for the post of head of the ECN library, a function that had been vacant for some time, and consequently he left science. He remained with the library until his retirement in 1992.

== Awards ==
- The Royal Swedish Academy of Sciences awarded Hugo M. Rietveld, the Aminoff prize in Stockholm, 31 March 1995.
- Barrett Award on behalf of the Denver X-ray Conference Organizing Committee in Denver, U.S., 6 August 2003.
- The Royal Award of Officer in the Order of Oranje-Nassau, for his outstanding contribution to the field of chemistry. Alkmaar, Netherlands, 28 October 2004.
- Award for Distinguished Powder Diffractionists, awarded by The European Diffraction Conferences, handed out on 30 August 2010 in Darmstadt.
- Hans-Kühl-Medal 2010, awarded by Gesellschaft Deutscher Chemiker (GDCh), Fachgruppe Bauchemie, handed out on 7 October 2010 in Dortmund.
