= PILATUS (detector) =

Series of x-ray detectors developed by the Paul Scherrer Institute

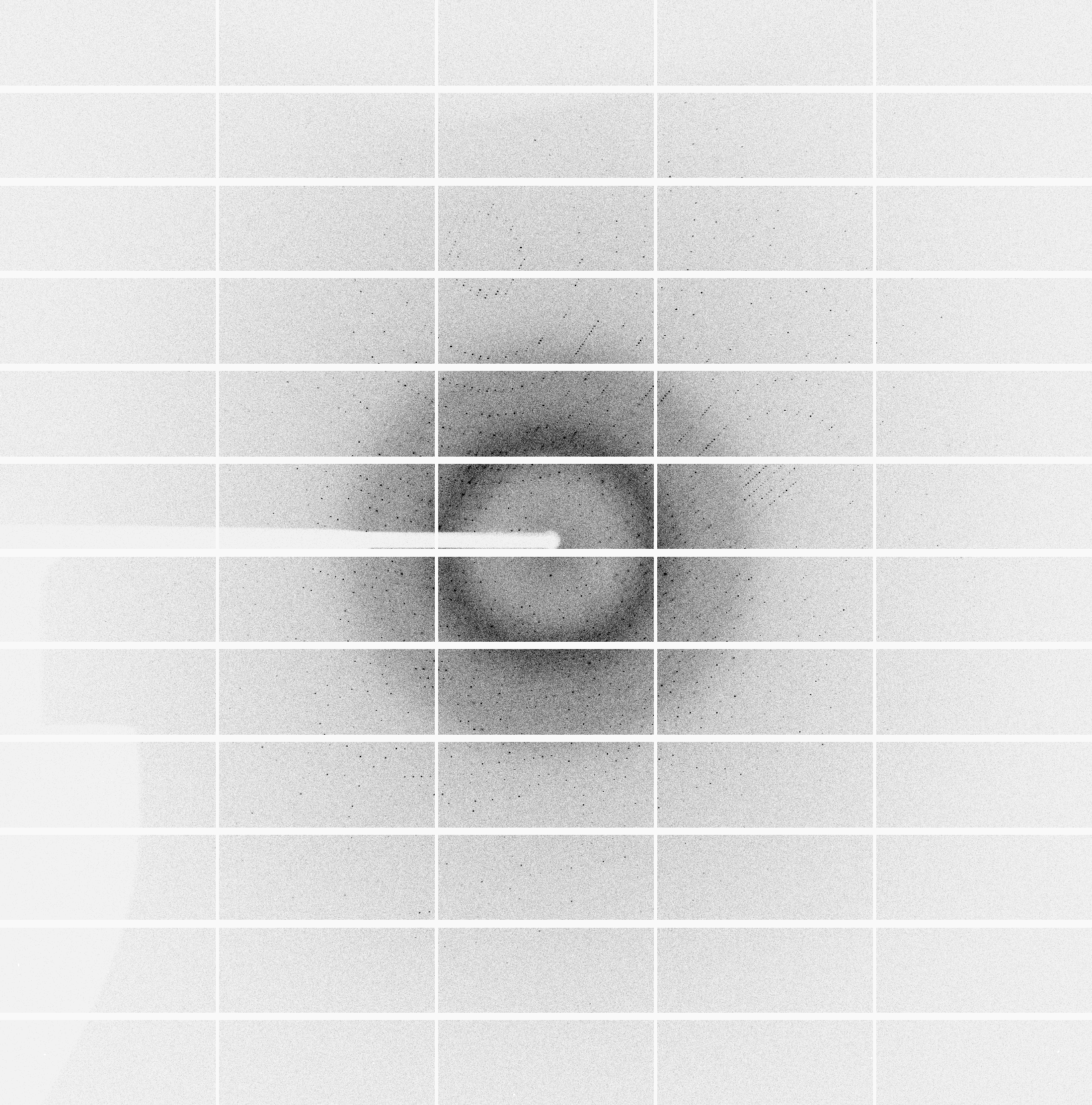
Diffraction pattern of the protein thaumatin in its tetragonal crystal form, recorded on a PILATUS 6M at the HZB MX beamline BL14.1.

PILATUS is the name of a series of x-ray detectors originally developed by the Paul Scherrer Institute at the Swiss Light Source and further developed and commercialized by DECTRIS. The PILATUS detectors are based on hybrid photon counting (HPC) technology, by which X-rays are converted to electrical signals by the photoelectric effect in a semiconductor sensor layer—either silicon or cadmium telluride—which is subject to a substantial bias voltage. The electric signals are counted directly by a series of cells in an ASIC bonded to the sensor. Each cell—or pixel—is a complete detector in itself, equipped with an amplifier, discriminator and counter circuit. This is possible thanks to contemporary CMOS integrated circuit technology.

The direct detection of single photons and the accurate determination of scattering and diffraction intensities over a wide dynamic range have resulted in PILATUS detectors becoming a standard at most synchrotron beamlines and being used for a large variety of X-ray applications, including: small-angle scattering, coherent scattering, X-ray powder diffraction and spectroscopy.

== History ==
The first large-area PILATUS detector was developed at PSI in 2003 as a project stemming from the development of pixel detectors for the CMS experiment at CERN. It became the first HPC detector to be widely used at synchrotron beamlines around the world.

The second generation PILATUS2 systems represented a major technological improvement, featuring a pixel size of 172×172μm, a counter depth of 20 bits and a radiation-tolerant design, necessary for operation with the intense X-ray beams at synchrotrons. In 2006, PILATUS2 was commercialized by DECTRIS. The field of protein crystallography rapidly benefited from the short readout time and noise free signal acquisition of the detector, since it substantially reduced the time required to collect data.

The third generation PILATUS3, introduced in 2012, features instant-retrigger technology, which allows for even higher photon counting rates than its predecessors.
