= Swiss Light Source =

Synchrotron radiation facility at Paul Scherrer Institute in Switzerland

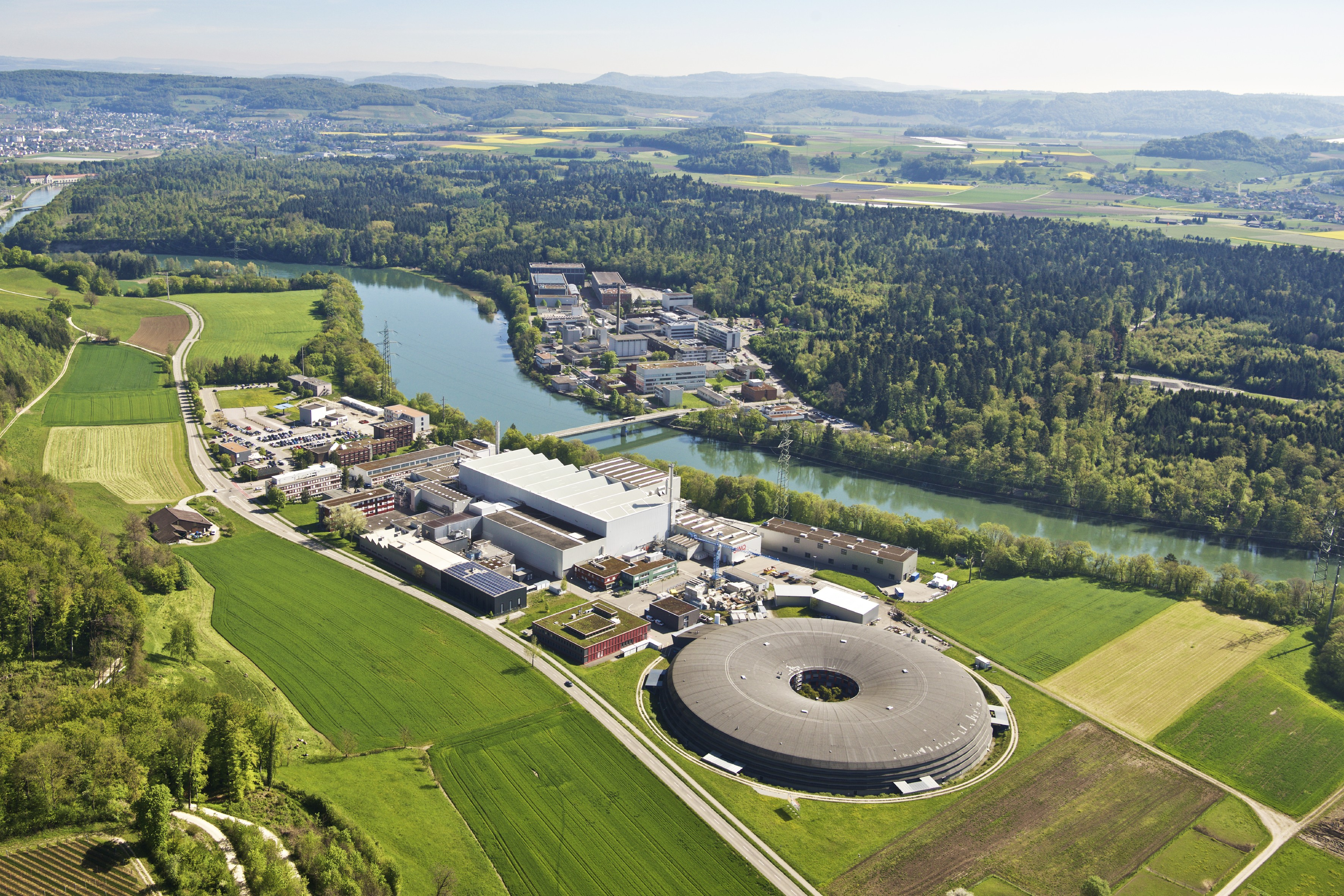
- Swiss Light Source in May 2016

General properties
- Accelerator type: Synchrotron light source
- Beam type: Electrons
- Target type: Light source

Beam properties
- Maximum energy: 2.7 GeV
- Maximum current: 400 mA

Physical properties
- Circumference: 288 metres (945 ft)
- Location: Villigen, Switzerland
- Institution: Paul Scherrer Institute
- Dates of operation: 2000 - present

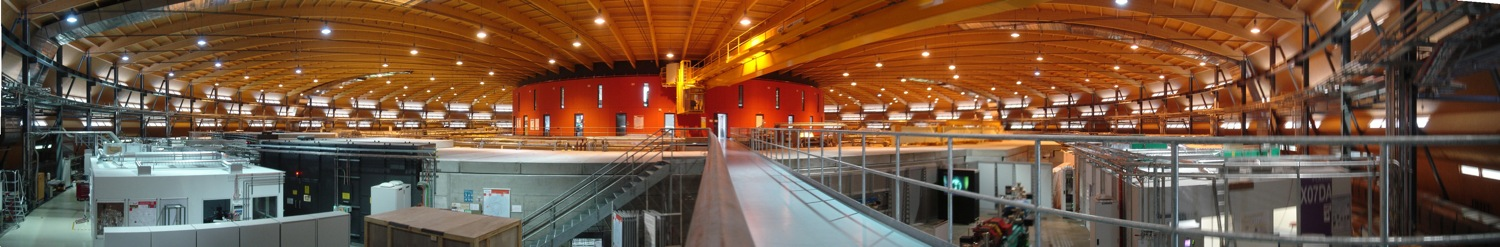
Panoramic view of the inside of the Swiss Light Source. An experiment end-station is visible on the left, the concrete tunnel at the end of the bridge in the middle of the photo houses the electron beam.

The Swiss Light Source (SLS) is a synchrotron located at the Paul Scherrer Institute (PSI) in Switzerland for producing electromagnetic radiation of high brightness. Planning started in 1991, the project was approved in 1997, and first light from the storage ring was seen at December 15, 2000. The experimental program started in June 2001 and it is used for research in materials science, biology and chemistry.

Main component of the SLS is the 2.4 GeV electron storage ring of 288 m circumference: The ring is formed by 36 dipole magnets of 1.4 tesla magnetic field, combined in 12 groups of three (triple bend achromat, TBA) for achromatic deflection of the electron beam. 12 straight sections between the TBAs of different lengths (3×11.5 m, 3×7 m, 6×4 m) accommodate the undulator magnets to generate ultraviolet and X-ray light of extreme brightness. 3 of the dipoles have an increased center field of 3 tesla to produce hard X-rays. A total of 177 quadrupole magnets (magnetic lenses) focuses the beam to provide a beam emittance of 5.5 nm rad. 120 sextupole magnets correct the chromatic focusing errors of the quadrupoles. 73 horizontal and vertical beam steerers are used to continuously correct the position of the electron beam. Finally 24 skew quadrupole magnets are adjusted to correct any torsion of the beam and to minimize the vertical emittance: a world record low value of 3 pm rad has been achieved in 2008.

The SLS has achieved a photon beam stability of 1 micrometre: the ring is operated in top-up mode, i.e. the stored current of 400 mA is kept constant to 2 mA by frequent (2–3 minutes) injections. This maintains a constant thermal load from synchrotron radiation. A fast orbit feedback system controlling the 73 beam position monitors and the 73 horizontal and vertical steerers corrects the position of the electron beam 4000 times per second to suppress any distortions from ground vibrations etc. Beam distortions from changing the undulator status as done during experiments are minimized by application of a set of feed forward corrections measured once for the undulators, the orbit feedback takes care of the rest. Finally X-ray beam position monitors measuring the location of the synchrotron radiation itself perform the final adjustment in front of the experiment.

SLS has a booster synchrotron optimized for top-up operation: it provides a low beam emittance of 10 nm rad for efficient beam injection into the storage ring, and it has a low average power consumption of 30 kW. This is achieved by a large circumference of 270 m, a large number (93) of small dipole magnets and a low aperture of only 30x20mm. The booster accelerates the beam from 100 MeV to 2.4 GeV (optional 2.7 GeV) at a repetition time of 320 ms. A 100 MeV linear accelerator as pre-injector completes the facility.

In 2006 the SLS-FEMTO facility came into operation: By interaction of a high energy (4 mJ), short pulse (50 fs fwhm) laser pulse with the electron beam in a wiggler magnet, a thin slice of the electron beam is modulated in energy. A magnetic chicane bracketing the wiggler and creating dispersion translates this energy modulation into a horizontal separation of the slices from the core beam. So radiation from the slices in a subsequent undulator can be separated by a system of apertures. In this way X-ray pulses of 140 fs length (fwhm) and a tunable photon energy of 3-18 keV can be generated. (This installation caused a major change of the storage ring resulting in the odd numbers of 177 quadrupoles and 73 steerers.) FEMTO experiments were discontinued in 2017, since the manpower was transferred to an experimental station at the SwissFEL.

As of June 2009 SLS has eighteen experimental stations (undulators and bending magnets) and seventeen operational beamlines.

There are three protein crystallography beam-lines, two of which are partially funded by associations of Swiss pharmaceutical companies including Novartis, Roche, Actelion, Boehringer Ingelheim and Proteros.

== See also ==
- Science and technology in Switzerland
