= Dectris =

DECTRIS
- Industry: Electrical equipment
- Founded: 2006
- Headquarters: Baden-Dättwil, Switzerland
- Area served: Worldwide
- Key people: Matthias Schneebeli (CEO)
- Products: X-ray detectors
- Number of employees: 130 (2021)
- Website: www.dectris.com

Dectris Ltd (German: Dectris AG, French, Italian, Romansh: Dectris SA) is a Swiss company producing photon counting X-ray detectors. These are used in synchrotrons worldwide as well as in laboratory imaging.

== History ==
Dectris was founded in 2006 as a spin-off company by Christian Brönnimann, a researcher at the Paul Scherrer Institute, and three colleagues, Eric F. Eikenberry, Markus Näf, and Petr Salficky. In 2007, the company sold its first detector unit in the PILATUS series. In 2008 the MYTHEN detector was introduced followed by the EIGER in 2015. In January 2022, Christian Brönnimann, who had been CEO since 2006, stepped down and Matthias Schneebeli (CTO since 2017) became the new CEO.

== Products ==
Dectris mainly develops and produces hybrid photon counting X-ray detectors. Three different product lines have been launched which all take their names from Swiss mountains, Pilatus, Mythen, and Eiger. All detectors use direct detection, meaning that X-ray photons are directly converted to electron-hole pairs instead of using visible light as an intermediary. This improves efficiency significantly and enables much higher count rates. Nearly two thirds of all structures in the Protein Data Bank have been solved using dectris detectors, legacy CCD detectors making up most of the rest.

In recent years Dectris has developed and started producing electron detectors.
