= SwissFEL =

SwissFEL is the X-ray free-electron laser at the Paul Scherrer Institute (PSI), which was inaugurated in December 2016.

The SwissFEL design is optimised to generate X-ray pulses in the wavelength range of 1 Å to 70 Å. With an overall length of just under 740 metres, the system configuration is relatively compact. Construction work for SwissFEL began in the spring of 2013. After completion of the building, installation of the technical components started at the beginning of 2015. The first pilot experiments were carried out in 2017. In 2018, the first beamline, called ARAMIS, was put into operation. The second beamline, ATHOS, was put into operation in June 2020.

SwissFEL has two beamlines, the hard X-ray beamline ARAMIS (λ=0.1-0.7 nm) with the end-stations Alvra, Bernina and Crystallina, as well as the soft X-ray beamline ATHOS (λ=0.65-5.0 nm) with the endstations Maloja and Furka. ARAMIS delivers very high-energy short-wave X-ray light, which can be used to follow how atoms behave during a fast-moving process. ATHOS delivers softer X-ray light with lower energy, making it possible to observe atoms and molecules as they form a new chemical bond. The total construction cost is around 275 million Swiss francs.

== Location ==
SwissFEL was built in the Würenlinger forest, near the PSI campus. There the temperature fluctuations and vibrations are particularly small, and this simplifies operations: The temperature in the beam channel may not deviate more than 0.1 degree from the ideal 24 degrees Celsius, because otherwise the slightest material expansions could distort the measurement results or thwart experiments entirely. This is also why large parts of the long building were covered with earth and gravel. Doing so created, at the same time, a so-called alkaline grassland biotope that serves as a natural habitat for many endangered plants and animals.

== How it works ==
SwissFEL essentially consists of four components: an electron source, a linear accelerator, an arrangement of undulators, and measuring stations. Electrons are set free from a copper disk with a pulsed laser. The cloud of released electrons is accelerated and held together with an electrical field. They are guided into the linear accelerator, which further accelerates the electrons with alternating current at high frequency. The electrons now fly through the undulator, a stretch of dipole magnets in an alternating arrangement: This forces them onto a slalom course. With every change of direction, the electrons emit X-ray light. This produces an X-ray beam with laser-like properties, which can be used for experiments in the measuring stations.

The X-ray beam reaches up to 10 gigawatts of power and is pulsed extremely rapidly: up to 100 flashes per second, each lasting only 1 to 60 femtoseconds. The pulses are so bright that they can be used to produce films of the movements of atoms and molecules. There are only four other X-ray laser facilities on a comparable scale in the entire world.

== Application Areas ==
X-ray lasers like SwissFEL can be used, for example, to study new materials for electronics with the aim of further advancing miniaturisation in this field. The course of catalytic reactions can be followed on the atomic level in order to optimise them and thus improve resource efficiency in environmental technology or the chemical industry. Biomedical scientists can observe in detail the structure of vital proteins and their reactions to substances, in order to develop new drugs.
