= Ultracold neutrons =

Free neutrons stored in very small traps

Ultracold neutrons (UCN) are free neutrons which can be stored in traps made from certain materials. The storage is based on the reflection of UCN by such materials under any angle of incidence.

== Properties ==
The reflection is caused by the coherent strong interaction of the neutron with atomic nuclei. It can be quantum-mechanically described by an effective potential which is commonly referred to as the Fermi pseudo potential or the neutron optical potential. The corresponding velocity is called the critical velocity of a material. Neutrons are reflected from a surface if the velocity component normal to the reflecting surface is less than or equal to the critical velocity.

As the neutron optical potential of most materials is below 300 neV, the kinetic energy of incident neutrons must not be higher than this value to be reflected under any angle of incidence, especially for normal incidence. The kinetic energy of 300 neV corresponds to a maximum velocity of 7.6 m/s (or a minimum wavelength of 52 nm). As their density is usually very small, UCN can also be described as a very thin ideal gas with a temperature of 3.5 mK.

Due to the small kinetic energy of an UCN, the influence of gravitation is significant. Thus, the trajectories are parabolic. Kinetic energy of an UCN transforms into potential (height) energy with ~102 neV/m.

The magnetic moment of the neutron, produced by its spin, interacts with magnetic fields. The total energy changes with ~60 neV/T.

UCN can lose polarization during their storage in material traps. The neutron spin-flip probability for the materials studied amounts to ~ (1–2)×10^{−5} per collision and does not depend on the temperature.

== History ==
Enrico Fermi first realized that the coherent scattering of slow neutrons would result in an effective interaction potential for neutrons traveling through matter, which would be positive for most materials. The consequence of such a potential would be the total reflection of neutrons slow enough and incident on a surface at a glancing angle. This effect was experimentally demonstrated by Fermi and Walter Henry Zinn and Fermi and Leona Marshall. The storage of neutrons with very low kinetic energies was predicted by Yakov Borisovich Zel'dovich and experimentally realized simultaneously by groups at Dubna and Munich.

== UCN production ==
There are various methods for the production of UCN. Such facilities have been built and are in operation:

1. The use of a horizontal evacuated tube from the reactor, curved so all but UCN would be absorbed by the walls of the tube before reaching the detector.
2. Neutrons transported from the reactor though a vertical evacuated guide about 11 meters long are slowed down by gravity, so only those that happened to have ultracold energies can reach the detector at the top of the tube.
3. A neutron turbine in which neutrons at 50 m/s are directed against the blades of a turbine wheel with receding tangential velocity 25 m/s, from which neutrons emerge after multiple reflections with a speed of about 5 m/s.
4. Protons are accelerated to around 600 MeV and impinge on a lead target, producing neutrons via spallation. These neutrons are thermalized in e.g. heavy water and then moderated e.g. in liquid or solid deuterium to be cold. The final production of UCN occurs via downscattering in solid deuterium. Such a UCN source was realized at the Paul Scherrer Institute, Switzerland and at the Los Alamos National Laboratory, USA.
5. Superfluid helium at low temperature can convert cold neutrons into ultracold ones. With a source of this type it is possible to achieve a UCN density of 1.3·10^{4} n/cm^{3}.

== Reflecting materials ==
Material:	V_{F}	v_{C}	η (10^{−4})
Beryllium	252 neV	6.89 m/s	2.0–8.5
BeO	261 neV	6.99 m/s	
Nickel	252 neV	6.84 m/s	5.1
Diamond	304 neV	7.65 m/s	
Graphite	180 neV	5.47 m/s	
Iron	210 neV	6.10 m/s	1.7–28
Copper	168 neV	5.66 m/s	2.1–16
Aluminium	54 neV	3.24 m/s	2.9–10

Any material with a positive neutron optical potential can reflect UCN. The table on the right gives an (incomplete) list of UCN reflecting materials including the height of the neutron optical potential (V_{F}) and the corresponding critical velocity (v_{C}). The height of the neutron optical potential is isotope-specific. The highest known value of V_{F} is measured for ^{58}Ni: 335 neV (v_{C} = 8.14 m/s). It defines the upper limit of the kinetic energy range of UCN.

The most widely used materials for UCN wall coatings are beryllium, beryllium oxide, nickel (including ^{58}Ni), and, more recently, diamond-like carbon (DLC).

Non-magnetic materials such as DLC are usually preferred for the use with polarized neutrons. Magnetic centers in e.g. Ni can lead to de-polarization of such neutrons upon reflection. If a material is magnetized, the neutron optical potential is different for the two polarizations, caused by

$$V_F(pol.)=V_F(unpol.)\pm\mu_N\cdot B$$

where $\mu_N$ is the magnetic moment of the neutron and $B=\mu_0\cdot M$ the magnetic field created on the surface by the magnetization.

Each material has a specific loss probability per reflection,

$$\mu(E,\theta)=2\eta\sqrt{\frac{E\cos^2\theta}{V_F-E\cos^2\theta}}$$

which depends on the kinetic energy of the incident UCN (E) and the angle of incidence (θ). It is caused by absorption and thermal upscattering. The loss coefficient η is energy-independent and typically of the order of 10^{−4} to 10^{−3}.

== Experiments with UCN ==
The production, transportation, and storage of UCN is currently motivated by their usefulness as a tool to determine properties of the neutron and to study fundamental physical interactions. Storage experiments have improved the accuracy or the upper limit of some neutron related physical values.

=== Measurement of the neutron lifetime ===
The average value for the neutron lifetime over eight different measurements is $878.4\pm0.5\,{\mathrm s}\,$. The most precise result obtained with material trap is $878.5~\pm0.7_{\mathrm{stat}}\pm0.4_{\mathrm{syst}}\,{\mathrm s}\,$. The most precise result obtained with magnetic trap is $\tau_n=877.75\pm0.28_{\mathrm{stat}}{^{+0.22}_{-0.16}}_{\mathrm{syst}}\,{\mathrm s}\,$ The "neutron lifetime anomaly" has not been resolved. Some sources suggest that residual protons in the form of H_{2} may be responsible while others point to residual neutron excited states.

=== Measurement of the neutron electric dipole moment ===
The neutron electric dipole moment is a measure for the distribution of positive and negative charge inside the neutron. No neutron electric dipole moment has been found as of October 2025. The lowest value for the upper limit of the neutron electric dipole moment was measured with stored UCN (see main article).

=== Observation of the gravitational interactions of the neutron ===
Gravitationally bound quantum states of matter were first experimentally observed due to the distinctive characteristics of ultracold neutrons. The quantum states of neutrons in the earth's gravitational field were first observed at the Institut Laue-Langevin. The results confirmed that neutrons do not move continuously but rather transition discretely between quantized heights, in agreement with the predictions of quantum theory (see also quantum bouncing ball). The finding could be used to probe fundamental physics such as the equivalence principle, which states that different masses accelerate at the same rate in a gravitational field. UCN spectroscopy has been used to limit scenarios including dark energy, chameleon fields, and new short range forces.

=== Search for neutron to mirror-neutron oscillations ===
Ultracold neutrons are used in experiments to measure possible oscillations between neutrons and hypothetical mirror matter neutrons.

Mirror matter is considered as a candidate for dark matter as well as a way to restore parity symmetry. Oscillations between ordinary and mirror matter would be expected to be suppressed by ordinary electromagnetic fields. Lifetime measurements on ultracold neutrons in a carefully shielded storage trap limit the neutron–mirror neutron oscillation time to more than 448 s.

=== Measurement of the A-coefficient of the neutron beta decay correlation ===
The first reported measurement of the beta-asymmetry using UCN is from a Los Alamos group in 2009. The LANSCE group published precision measurements with polarized UCN the next year. Further measurements by these groups and others have led to the current world average:

$$A_0 = -0.11958 \pm 0.00021$$
