= Magnetic chicane =

Component of x-ray laser

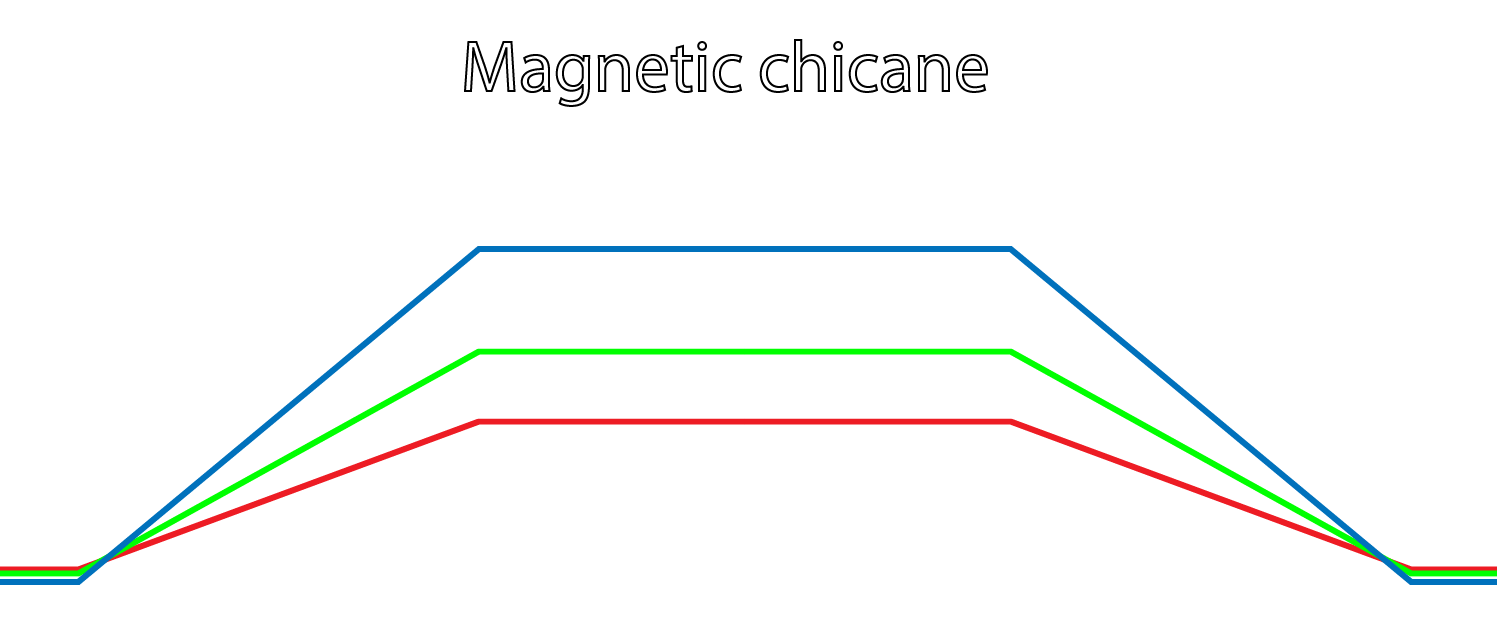
Magnetic chicane compresses bunches longitudinally by shortening the path of more massive particles

A magnetic chicane also called a bunch compressor helps form dense bunches of electrons in a free-electron laser. A magnetic chicane makes electrons detour slightly from their otherwise straight path, and in that way is similar to a chicane on a road.

A magnetic chicane consists of four dipole magnets, giving electrons at the beginning of a bunch a longer path than electrons at the end of the bunch, thereby allowing the lagging electrons to catch up.

== Free-electron laser ==
A free-electron laser depends upon a beam of tightly bunched electrons. Short bunches of electrons are produced by a photoinjector, but they quickly elongate, because electrons have negative charge and little mass, causing the bunch to expand. As the bunch is accelerated, the electrons gain mass and quickly approach the speed of light. After that, electrons at the end of the bunch cannot go any faster to catch up with electrons at the beginning of the bunch.

== Chirp ==
This problem is solved by adjusting the phase of the driving electric field to more strongly add energy and mass to electrons at the trailing end of the bunch. This is called negative energy chirp, meaning the energy decreases along the direction of beam travel. Because the beam is traveling at almost the speed of light, the trailing electrons gain mass, rather than velocity. This results in a correlation between mass and position in the bunch.

== Chicane ==
The chicane gives lagging electrons time to catch up. More massive electrons are deflected less by the magnetic field than lighter electrons, and therefore take a shorter path through the chicane, resulting in a shorter bunch. A chicane consists of four dipole magnets with the following roles:

1. Deflects the beam slightly away from the central axis of the accelerator, with lighter electrons deflected more than more massive electrons.
2. Deflects the beam in the opposite direction, making it parallel to the central axis, but with an offset. The offset is greatest for lighter electrons.
3. Deflects the beam back towards the central axis.
4. Deflects the beam back in the direction of the central axis.

== Limitations ==
In practice, bunch compression cannot be done a single step. To avoid beam emittance blowup, beam compression is usually done by using two chicanes.
