= Villigen =

- Municipality
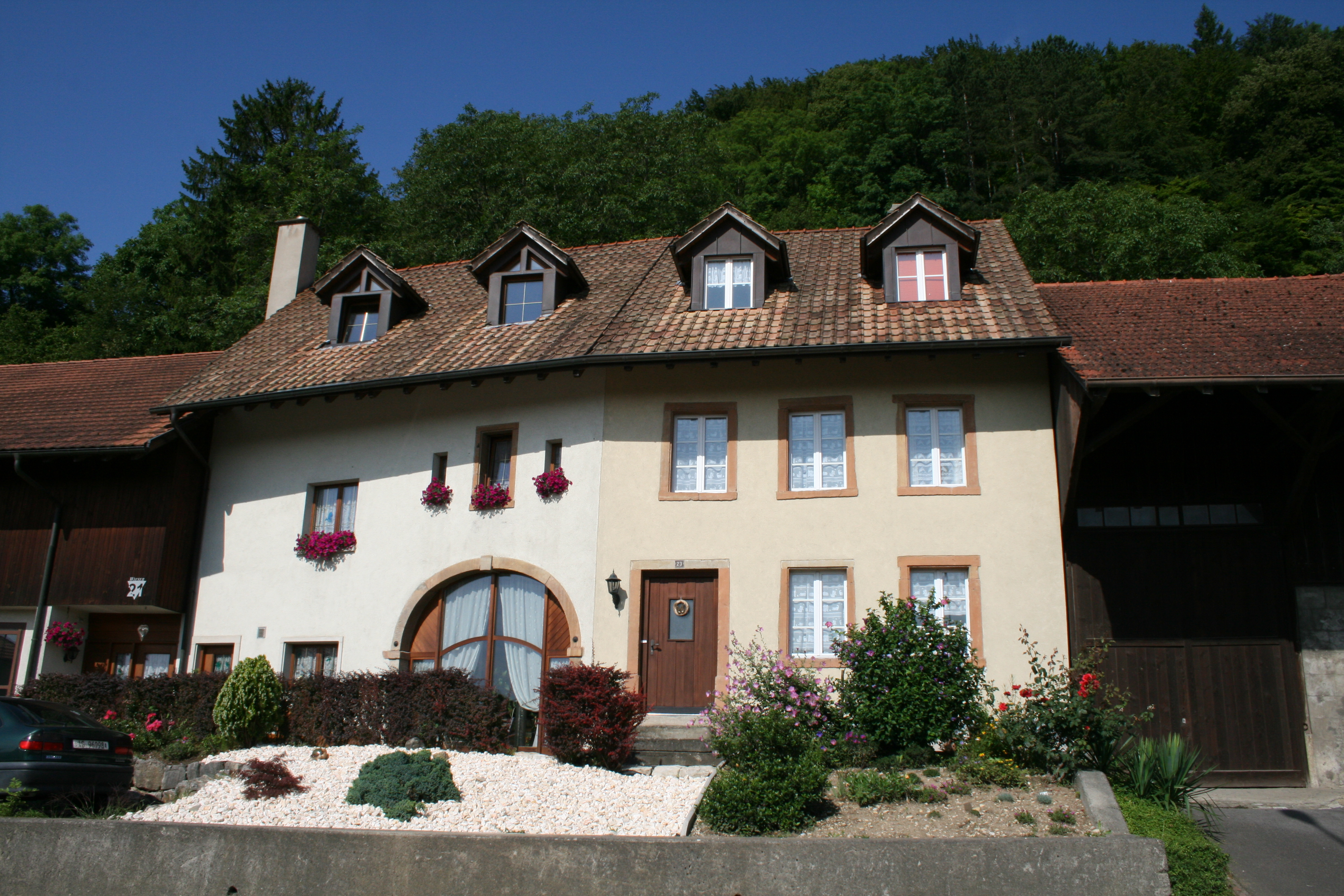

- Flag Coat of arms
- Location of Villigen
- Location within Switzerland Location within Canton of Aargau
- Coordinates: 47°32′N 8°13′E
- Country: Switzerland
- Canton: Aargau
- District: Brugg

Area
  - Total: 11.22 km^{2} (4.33 sq mi)
- Elevation: 367 m (1,204 ft)

Population (December 2020)
  - Total: 2,120
  - Density: 189/km^{2} (489/sq mi)
- Time zone: UTC+01:00 (CET)
  - Summer (DST): UTC+02:00 (CEST)
- Postal code: 5234 Villigen 5233 Stilli
- SFOS number: 4121
- ISO 3166 code: CH-AG
- Surrounded by: Böttstein, Brugg, Hottwil, Mandach, Remigen, Rüfenach, Untersiggenthal, Würenlingen
- Website: www.villigen.ch

Villigen is a municipality in the district of Brugg in the canton of Aargau in Switzerland. In January 2006, Villigen incorporated the former municipality of Stilli.

The Paul Scherrer Institute is primarily located in Villigen, although part is across the Aare river in Würenlingen.

== Geography ==
Aerial view from 1000 m by Walter Mittelholzer (1919)

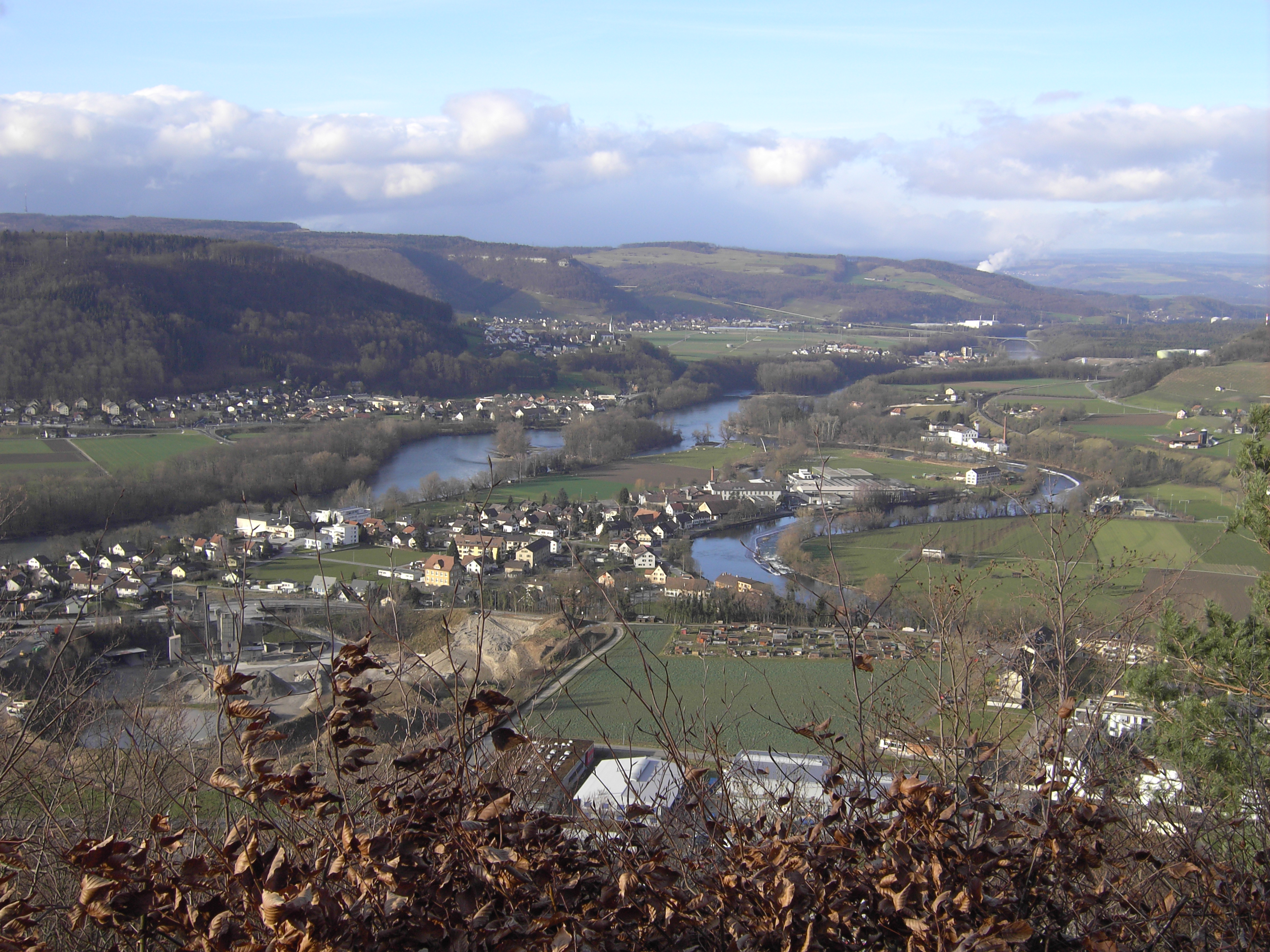
View from Gebenstorf-Vogelsang, Villigen is the center background.

Villigen has an area, as of 2009, of 11.22 square kilometers (4.33 sq mi). Of this area, 3.88 square kilometers (1.50 sq mi) or 34.6% is used for agricultural purposes, while 5.5 square kilometers (2.1 sq mi) or 49.0% is forested. Of the rest of the land, 1.51 square kilometers (0.58 sq mi) or 13.5% is settled (buildings or roads), 0.31 square kilometers (0.12 sq mi) or 2.8% is either rivers or lakes.

Of the built up area, housing and buildings made up 5.7% and transportation infrastructure made up 2.7%. Power and water infrastructure as well as other special developed areas made up 4.6% of the area. 47.6% of the total land area is heavily forested and 1.4% is covered with orchards or small clusters of trees. Of the agricultural land, 18.1% is used for growing crops and 13.4% is pastures, while 3.1% is used for orchards or vine crops. All the water in the municipality is in rivers and streams.

== Coat of arms ==
The blazon of the municipal coat of arms is Azure a Bear's Gambe in pale couped Or and in Chief three Mullets of Five of the same one and two and Coupeaux Vert.

== Demographics ==
Villigen has a population (as of December 2020) of 2,120 As of June 2009, 22.6% of the population are foreign nationals. Over the last 10 years (1997–2007) the population has changed at a rate of 3.6%. Most of the population (as of 2000) speaks German (88.8%), with Italian being second most common ( 2.4%) and Albanian being third ( 1.7%).

The age distribution, as of 2008, in Villigen is; 158 children or 8.0% of the population are between 0 and 9 years old and 218 teenagers or 11.1% are between 10 and 19. Of the adult population, 276 people or 14.0% of the population are between 20 and 29 years old. 263 people or 13.4% are between 30 and 39, 351 people or 17.8% are between 40 and 49, and 327 people or 16.6% are between 50 and 59. The senior population distribution is 200 people or 10.2% of the population are between 60 and 69 years old, 120 people or 6.1% are between 70 and 79, there are 50 people or 2.5% who are between 80 and 89, and there are 4 people or 0.2% who are 90 and older.

As of 2000, there were 49 homes with 1 or 2 persons in the household, 356 homes with 3 or 4 persons in the household, and 283 homes with 5 or more persons in the household. The average number of people per household was 2.46 individuals. As of 2000, there were 711 private households (homes and apartments) in the municipality, and an average of 2.5 persons per household. In 2008 there were 370 single family homes (or 45.1% of the total) out of a total of 821 homes and apartments. Over the 8 years between the two surveys, the number of private households in the municipality increased by 110. There was a total of 1 empty apartment for a 0.1% vacancy rate. As of 2007, the construction rate of new housing units was 3.7 new units per 1000 residents.

In the 2007 federal election the most popular party was the SVP which received 40.5% of the vote. The next three most popular parties were the SP (18.5%), the FDP (13.2%) and the CVP (11.8%).

In Villigen about 77.4% of the population (between age 25–64) have completed either non-mandatory upper secondary education or additional higher education (either university or a Fachhochschule). Of the school age population (in the 2008/2009 school year), there are 101 students attending primary school in the municipality.

The historical population is given in the following table:

Historical population
Year	Pop.	±%
1975	905	—
1980	922	+1.9%
1990	1,248	+35.4%
2000	1,427	+14.3%

== Sights ==
The village of Villigen is designated as part of the Inventory of Swiss Heritage Sites.

== Economy ==
As of 2007, Villigen had an unemployment rate of 1.51%. As of 2005, there were 89 people employed in the primary economic sector and about 16 businesses involved in this sector. 33 people are employed in the secondary sector and there are 13 businesses in this sector. 1,966 people are employed in the tertiary sector, with 48 businesses in this sector.

As of 2000 there was a total of 789 workers who lived in the municipality. Of these, 592 or about 75.0% of the residents worked outside Villigen while 1,071 people commuted into the municipality for work. There were a total of 1,268 jobs (of at least 6 hours per week) in the municipality. Of the working population, 16.4% used public transportation to get to work, and 50.6% used a private car.

== Religion ==
From the 2000 census, 616 or 34.5% were Roman Catholic, while 828 or 46.3% belonged to the Swiss Reformed Church. Of the rest of the population, there were 4 individuals (or about 0.22% of the population) who belonged to the Christian Catholic faith.
