= Paul Scherrer Institute =

Swiss federal research institute

Coordinates: 47°32′10″N 8°13′22″E

The Paul Scherrer Institute (PSI) is a multi-disciplinary research institute for natural and engineering sciences in Switzerland. It is located in the Canton of Aargau in the municipalities Villigen and Würenlingen on either side of the River Aare, and covers an area over 35 hectares in size. Like ETH Zurich and EPFL, PSI belongs to the ETH Domain of the Swiss Confederation. PSI employs around 3000 people. It conducts basic and applied research in the fields of matter and materials, human health, and energy and the environment. About 37% of PSI's research activities focus on material sciences, 24% on life sciences, 19% on general energy, 11% on nuclear energy and safety, and 9% on particle physics.

PSI develops, builds and operates large and complex research facilities and makes them available to the national and international scientific communities. In 2017, for example, more than 2,500 researchers from 60 different countries came to PSI to take advantage of the concentration of large-scale research facilities in the same location, which is unique worldwide. About 1,900 experiments are conducted each year at the approximately 40 measuring stations in these facilities.

In recent years, the institute has been one of the largest recipients of money from the Swiss lottery fund.

== History ==
The institute, named after the Swiss physicist Paul Scherrer, was created in 1988 when EIR (Eidgenössisches Institut für Reaktorforschung, Swiss Federal Institute for Reactor Research, founded in 1960) was merged with SIN (Schweizerisches Institut für Nuklearphysik, Swiss Institute for Nuclear Research, founded in 1968). The two institutes on opposite sides of the River Aare served as national centres for research: one focusing on nuclear energy and the other on nuclear and particle physics. Over the years, research at the centres expanded into other areas, and nuclear and reactor physics accounts for just 11 percent of the research work at PSI today. Since Switzerland decided in 2011 to phase out nuclear energy, this research has primarily been concerned with questions of safety, such as how to store radioactive waste safely in a deep geological repository.

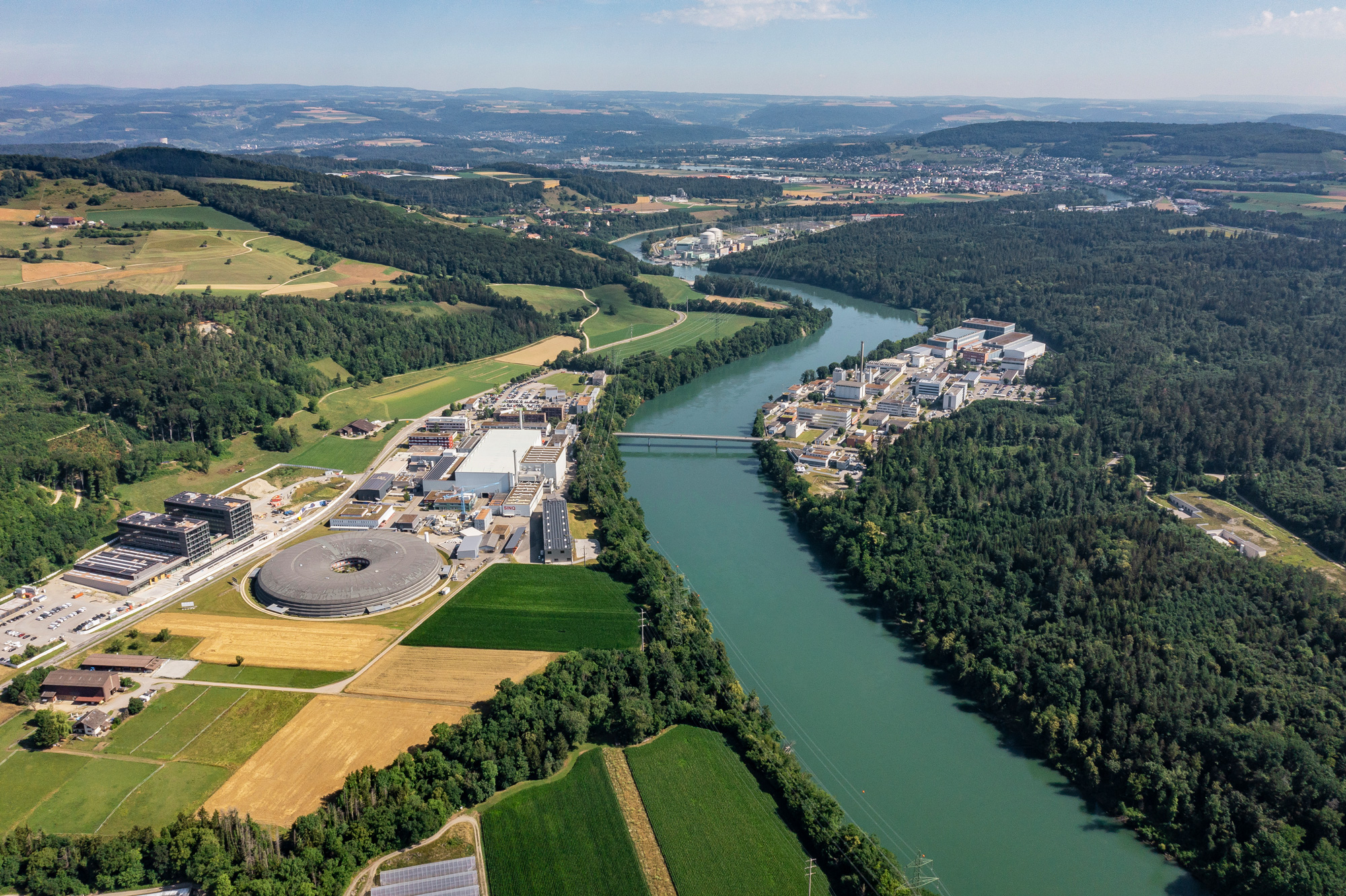
PSI is located on the right and left banks of the River Aare in Canton Aargau, Switzerland

Since 1984, PSI has operated (initially as SIN) the centre for Proton Therapy for treating patients with eye melanomas and other tumours located deep inside the body. More than 9,000 patients have been treated there until now (status 2020).

The institute is also active in space research. For example, in 1990 PSI engineers built the detector of the EUVITA telescope for the Russian satellite Spectrum X-G, and later also supplied NASA and ESA with detectors to analyse radiation in space. In 1992, physicists used accelerator mass spectrometry and radiocarbon methods to determine the age of Ötzi, the mummy found in a glacier in the Ötztal Alps a year earlier, from small samples of just a few milligrams of bone, tissue and grass. They were analysed at the TANDEM accelerator on the Hönggerberg near Zurich, which at the time was jointly operated by ETH Zurich and PSI.

In 2009, the Indian-born British structural biologist Venkatraman Ramakrishnan was awarded the Nobel Prize in Chemistry for, among other things, his research at the Synchrotron Light Source Switzerland (SLS). The SLS is one of PSI's four large-scale research facilities. His investigations there enabled Ramakrishnan to clarify what ribosomes look like and how they function at the level of individual molecules. Using the information encoded in the genes, ribosomes produce proteins that control many chemical processes in living organisms.

In 2010, an international team of researchers at PSI used negative muons to perform a new measurement of the proton and found that its radius is significantly smaller than previously thought: 0.84184 femtometers instead of 0.8768. According to press reports, this result was not only surprising, it could also call previous models in physics into question. The measurements were only possible with PSI's 590 MeV proton accelerator HIPA because its secondarily generated muon beam is the only one worldwide that is intense enough to conduct the experiment.

In 2011, researchers from PSI and elsewhere succeeded in deciphering the basic structure of the protein molecule rhodopsin with the help of the SLS. This optical pigment acts as a kind of light sensor and plays a decisive role in the process of sight.

A so-called ‘barrel pixel detector’ built at PSI was a central element in the CMS detector at the Geneva nuclear research centre CERN, and was thus involved in detecting the Higgs boson. This discovery, announced on 4 July 2012, was awarded the Nobel Prize in Physics one year later.

In January 2016, 20 kilograms of plutonium were taken from PSI to the USA. According to a newspaper report, the federal government had a secret plutonium storage facility in which the material had been kept since the 1960s to construct an atomic bomb as planned at the time. The Federal Council denied this, maintaining the plutonium-239 content of the material was below 92 percent, which meant it was not weapons-grade material. The idea was rather to use the material obtained from reprocessed fuel rods of the Diorit research reactor, which was operated from 1960 to 1977, to develop a new generation of fuel element types for nuclear power plants. This, however, never happened. By the time it was decided, in 2011, to phase out nuclear power, it had become clear that there was no further use for the material in Switzerland. The Federal Council decided at the Nuclear Security Summit in 2014 to close the Swiss plutonium storage facility. A bilateral agreement between the two countries meant the plutonium could then be transferred to the US for further storage.

The removal of plutonium from PSI was praised by the U.S. National Nuclear Security Administration as a contribution to global non-proliferation efforts. Switzerland was recognized as eliminating all separated plutonium from its territory ahead of the 2016 Nuclear Security Summit, in cooperation with U.S., U.K., and IAEA authorities.

PSI-Directors
Term	Director
1988–1990	Jean-Pierre Blaser
1990–1991	Anton Menth
1991–1992	Wilfred Hirt (Interim)
1992–2002	Meinrad Eberle
2002–2007	Ralph Eichler
2007–2008	Martin Jermann (Interim)
2008–2018	Joël Mesot
2019–2020	Thierry Strässle (Interim)
Since 1 April 2020	Christian Rüegg

In July 2017, the three-dimensional alignment of magnetization inside a three-dimensional magnetic object was investigated and visualized with the help of the SLS without affecting the material. The technology is expected to be useful in developing better magnets, for example for motors or data storage.

Joël François Mesot, the long-standing Director of PSI (2008 to 2018), was elected President of ETH Zurich at the end of 2018. His post was temporarily taken over by the physicist and PSI Chief of Staff Thierry Strässle from January 2019. Since 1 April 2020, the physicist Christian Rüegg has been Director of PSI. He was previously head of the PSI research division Neutrons and Muons.

Numerous PSI spin-off companies have been founded over the years to make the research findings available to the wider society. The largest spin-off, with 120 employees, is the DECTRIS AG, founded in 2006 in nearby Baden, which specializes in the development and marketing of X-ray detectors. SwissNeutronics AG in Klingnau, which sells optical components for neutron research facilities, was founded as early as 1999. Several recent PSI offshoots, such as the manufacturer of metal-organic frameworks novoMOF or the drug developer leadXpro, have settled close to PSI in the Park Innovaare, which was founded in 2015 with the support of several companies and Canton Aargau.

In 2024, the European Space Agency (ESA) and the PSI signed an agreement to establish the European Space Deep-Tech Innovation Centre (ESDI) near the PSI campus in northern Switzerland. The centre, formally part of ESA, includes a research platform called Phi-Lab, which is integrated into PSI and supports innovation initiatives. PSI has a long-standing relationship with ESA, including the development of the RADEM radiation detector for the JUICE mission to Jupiter, launched in 2023.

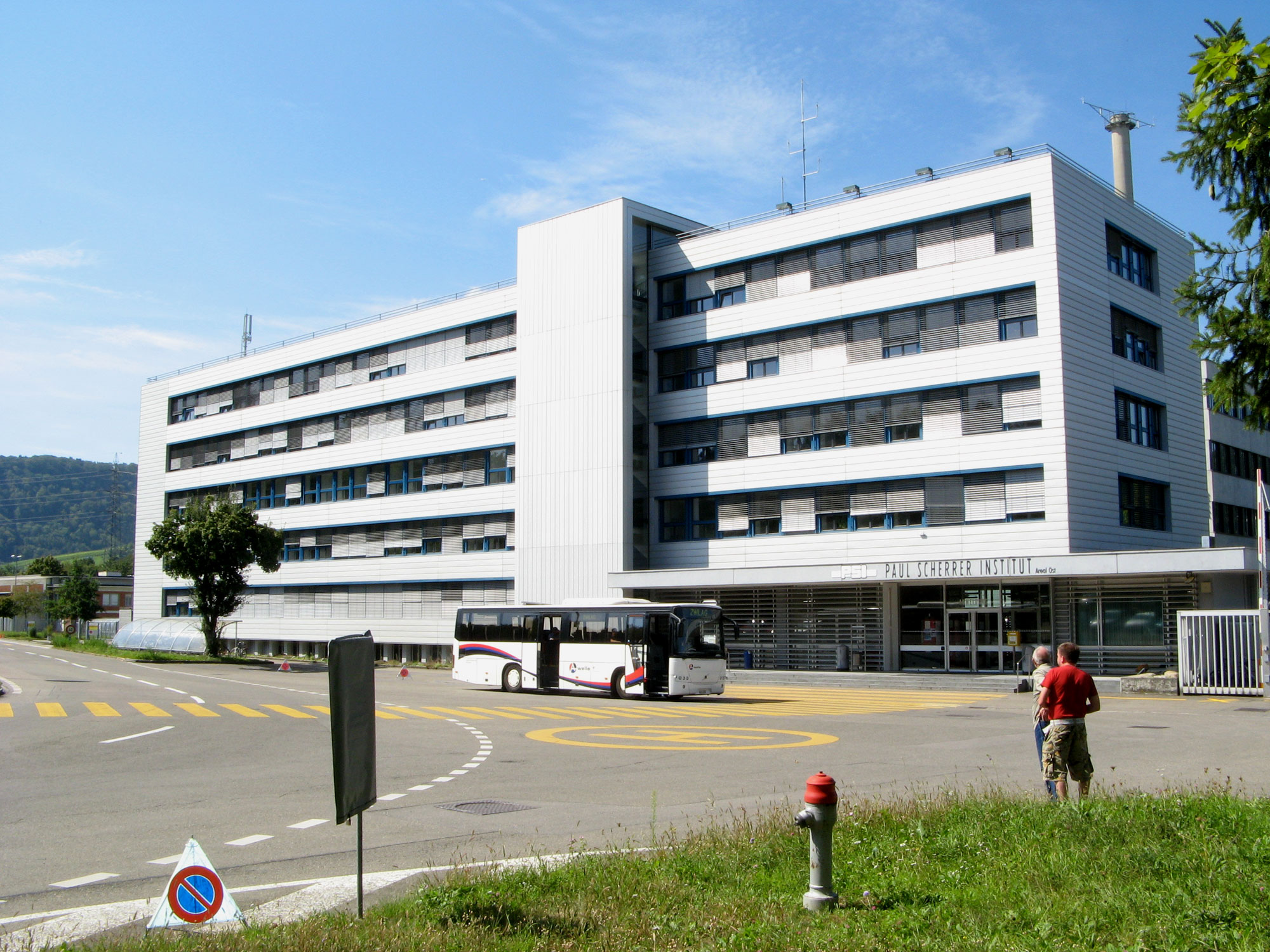
PSI administration building in PSI East in Würenlingen

== Research areas and departments ==
PSI develops, builds and operates several accelerator facilities, e. g. a 590 MeV high-current cyclotron, which in normal operation supplies a beam current of about 2.2 mA. PSI also operates four large-scale research facilities: a synchrotron light source (SLS), which is particularly brilliant and stable, a spallation neutron source (SINQ), a muon source (SμS) and an X-ray free-electron laser (SwissFEL). This makes PSI currently (2020) the only institute in the world to provide the four most important probes for researching the structure and dynamics of condensed matter (neutrons, muons and synchrotron radiation) on a campus for the international user community. In addition, HIPA's target facilities also produce pions that feed the muon source and the Ultracold Neutron source UCN produces very slow, ultracold neutrons. All these particle types are used for research in particle physics.

Research at PSI is conducted with the help of these facilities. Its focus areas include:

=== Matter and Material ===
All the materials humans work with are made up of atoms. The interaction of atoms and their arrangement determine the properties of a material. Most of the researchers in the field of matter and materials at PSI want to find out more about how the internal structure of different materials relates to their observable properties. Fundamental research in this area contributes to the development of new materials with a wide range of applications, for example in electrical engineering, medicine, telecommunications, mobility, new energy storage systems, quantum computers and spintronics. The phenomena investigated include superconductivity, ferro- and antiferromagnetism, spin fluids and topological insulators.

Neutrons are intensively used for materials research at PSI because they enable unique and non-destructive access to the interior of materials on a scale ranging from the size of atoms to objects a centimetre long. They therefore serve as ideal probes for investigating fundamental and applied research topics, such as quantum spin systems and their potential for application in future computer technologies, the functionalities of complex lipid membranes and their use for the transport and targeted release of drug substances, as well as the structure of novel materials for energy storage as key components in intelligent energy networks.

In particle physics, PSI researchers are investigating the structure and properties of the innermost layers of matter and what holds them together. Muons, pions and ultra-cold neutrons are used to test the Standard Model of elementary particles, to determine fundamental natural constants and to test theories that go beyond the Standard Model. Particle physics at PSI holds many records, including the most precise determination of the coupling constants of the weak interaction and the most accurate measurement of the charge radius of the proton. Some experiments aim to find effects that are not foreseen in the Standard Model, but which could correct inconsistencies in the theory or solve unexplained phenomena from astrophysics and cosmology. Their results so far agree with the Standard Model. Examples include the upper limit measured in the MEG experiment of the hypothetical decay of positive muons into positrons and photons as well as that of the permanent electric dipole moment for neutrons.

Muons are not only useful in particle physics, but also in solid-state physics and materials science. The muon spin spectroscopy method (μSR) is used to investigate the fundamental properties of magnetic and superconducting materials as well as of semiconductors, insulators and semiconductor structures, including technologically relevant applications such as for solar cells.

=== Energy and the Environment ===
PSI researchers are addressing all aspects of energy use with the aim to make energy supplies more sustainable. Focus areas include: new technologies for renewable energies, low-loss energy storage, energy efficiency, low-pollution combustion, fuel cells, experimental and model-based assessment of energy and material cycles, environmental impacts of energy production and consumption, and nuclear energy research, in particular reactor safety and waste management.

PSI operates the ESI (Energy System Integration) experimental platform to answer specific questions on seasonal energy storage and sector coupling. The platform can be used in research and industry to test promising approaches to integrating renewable energies into the energy system – for example, storing excess electricity from solar or wind power in the form of hydrogen or methane.

At PSI a method for extracting significantly more methane gas from biowaste was developed and successfully tested with the help of the ESI platform together with the Zurich power company Energie 360°. The team was awarded the Watt d'Or 2018 of the Swiss Federal Office of Energy.

A platform for catalyst research is also maintained at PSI. Catalysis is a central component in various energy conversion processes, for example in fuel cells, water electrolysis and the methanation of carbon dioxide.

To test the pollutant emissions of various energy production processes and the behaviour of the corresponding substances in the atmosphere, PSI also operates a smog chamber.

Another area of research at PSI is on the effects of energy production on the atmosphere locally, including in the Alps, in the polar regions of the Earth and in China.

The Nuclear Energy and Safety Division is dedicated to maintaining a good level of nuclear expertise and thus to training scientists and engineers in nuclear energy. For example, PSI maintains one of the few laboratories in Europe for investigating fuel rods in commercial reactors. The division works closely with ETH Zurich, EPFL and the University of Bern, using, for example, their high-performance computers or the CROCUS research reactor at EPFL.

In 2023, PSI researchers, working with Indian institutions, investigated the formation of night-time smog in New Delhi. They found that emissions from wood and waste burning condense in cooler temperatures to form fine particles, a process described as unique to the city. The findings were published in Nature Geoscience.

In 2024, PSI researchers, in collaboration with ETH Zurich, published a study suggesting that digitalisation could reduce Switzerland’s energy consumption by 10% to 20% by 2050 compared to 2020 levels. Based on a detailed energy system model with six million equations and variables, the study found that improved technologies and behavioral shifts could offset increased demand from remote work and data use, supporting the transition to a net-zero energy system.

=== Human health ===
PSI is one of the leading institutions worldwide in the research and application of proton therapy for the treatment of cancer. Since 1984, the Center for Proton Therapy has been successfully treating cancer patients with a special form of radiation therapy. To date, more than 7500 patients with ocular tumours have been irradiated (status 2020). The success rate for eye therapy using the OPTIS facility is over 98 percent.

In 1996, an irradiation unit (Gantry 1) was equipped for the first time to use the so-called spot-scanning proton technique developed at PSI. With this technique, tumours deep inside the body are scanned three-dimensionally with a proton beam about 5 to 7 mm in width. By superimposing many individual proton spots – about 10,000 spots per litre volume – the tumour is evenly exposed to the necessary radiation dose, which is monitored individually for each spot. This allows an extremely precise, homogeneous irradiation that is optimally adapted to the usually irregular shape of the tumour. The technique enables as much as possible of the surrounding healthy tissue to be spared. The first gantry was in operation for patients from 1996 to the end of 2018. In 2013, the second Gantry 2, developed at PSI, went into operation, and in mid-2018 another treatment station, Gantry 3, was opened.

In the field of radiopharmacy, PSI's infrastructure covers the entire spectrum. In particular, PSI researchers are tackling very small tumours distributed throughout the body. These cannot be treated with the usual radiotherapy techniques. New medically applicable radionuclides have, however, been produced with the help of the proton accelerators and the neutron source SINQ at PSI. When combined for therapy with special biomolecules (antibodies), therapeutic molecules can be formed to selectively and specifically detect tumour cells. These are then labelled with a radioactive isotope. Its radiation can be localized with imaging techniques such as SPECT or PET, which enables the diagnosis of tumours and their metastases. Moreover, it can be dosed so that it also destroys the tumour cells. Several such radioactive substances have been developed at PSI. They are currently being tested in clinical trials, in close cooperation with universities, clinics and the pharmaceutical industry. PSI also supplies local hospitals with radiopharmaceuticals if required.

Since the opening of the Synchrotron Light Source Switzerland (SLS), structural biology has been a further focus of research in the field of human health. Here, the structure and function of biomolecules are being investigated – preferably at atomic resolution. The PSI researchers are primarily concerned with proteins. Every living cell needs a myriad of these molecules in order, for example, to be able to metabolise, receive and transmit signals or to divide. The aim is to understand these life processes better and thus to be able to treat or prevent diseases more effectively.

For example, PSI is investigating the structure of microtubules, filamentous structures which, among other things, pull apart chromosomes during cell division. They consist of long protein chains. When chemotherapy is used to treat cancer, it disturbs the assembly or breakdown of these chains so that the cancer cells can no longer divide. Researchers are closely observing the structure of these proteins and how they change to find out exactly where cancer drugs have to attack the microtubules. With the help of PSI's SwissFEL free-electron X-ray laser, which was inaugurated in 2016, researchers have been able to analyse dynamic processes in biomolecules with extremely high time resolution – less than a trillionth of a second (picosecond). For example, they have detected how certain proteins in the photoreceptors of the retina of our eyes are activated by light.

== Accelerators and large research facilities at PSI ==
=== Proton accelerator facility ===
While PSI's proton accelerator, which went into service in 1974, was primarily used in the early days for elementary particle physics, today the focus is on applications for solid-state physics, radiopharmaceuticals and cancer therapy. Since it started operating, it has been constantly developed further, and its performance today is as much as 2.4 mA, which is 24 times higher than the initial 100 μA. This is why the facility is now considered a high-performance proton accelerator, or HIPA (High Intensity Proton Accelerator) for short. Basically, it consists of three accelerators in series: the Cockcroft-Walton, the injector-2 cyclotron, and the ring-cyclotron. They accelerate the protons to around 80 percent of the speed of light.

==== Proton source and Cockcroft-Walton ====
In a proton source based on cyclotron resonance, microwaves are used to strip electrons from hydrogen atoms. What remains are the hydrogen atomic nuclei, each consisting of only one proton. These protons leave the source with a potential of 60 kilovolts and are then subjected to a further voltage of 810 kilovolts in an accelerator tube. Both voltages are supplied by a Cockcroft-Walton accelerator. With a total of 870 kilovolts, the protons are accelerated to a speed of 46 million km/h or 4 percent of the speed of light. The protons are then fed into the Injector-2.

===== Injector-1 =====
With Injector-1, operating currents of 170 μA and peak currents of 200 μA could be reached. It was also used for low energy experiments, for OPTIS eye therapy and for the LiSoR experiment in the MEGAPIE project. Since December 1, 2010, this ring accelerator has been out of operation.

===== Injector-2 =====
Injektor-2
Type:	Isochronous spiral-back cyclotron
Magnets:	4 units
Total Magnet mass:	760 t
Accelerating elements:	4 Resonators (50 MHz)
Extraction Energy:	72 MeV

The Injector-2, which was commissioned in 1984 and developed by what was then SIN, replaced the Injector-1 as the injection machine for the 590 MeV ring cyclotron. Initially, it was possible to operate Injector-1 and Injector-2 alternately, but now only Injector-2 is used to feed the proton beam into the ring. The new cyclotron has enabled an increase in the beam current from 1 to 2 mA, which was the absolute record value for the 1980s. Today, the injector-2 delivers a beam current of ≈ 2.2 mA in routine operation and 2.4 mA in high current operation at 72 MeV, which is about 38 percent of the speed of light.

Originally, two resonators were operated at 150 MHz in flat-top mode to enable a clear separation of the proton orbits, but these are now also used for acceleration. Part of the extracted 72 MeV proton beam can be split off for isotope production, while the main part is fed into the Ring Cyclotron for further acceleration.

===== Ring =====
PSI Ring Cyclotron
Type:	Isochronous spiral-back cyclotron
Magnets:	8 units
Total Magnet mass:	2000 t
Accelerating elements:	4 (5) Cavities (50 MHz)
Extraction Energy:	590 MeV

Like the Injector-2, the Ring Cyclotron, which has a circumference of about 48 m, went into operation in 1974. It was specially developed at SIN and is at the heart of the PSI proton accelerator facilities. The protons are accelerated to 80 percent of the speed of light on the approximately 4 km long track, which the protons cover inside the ring in 186 laps. This corresponds to a kinetic energy of 590 MeV. Only three such rings exist worldwide, namely: TRIUMF in Vancouver, Canada; LAMPF in Los Alamos, USA; and the one at PSI. TRIUMF has only reached beam currents of 500 μA and LAMPF 1 mA.

In addition to the four original Cavities, a smaller fifth cavity was added in 1979. It is operated at 150 megahertz as a flat-top cavity, and has enabled a significant increase in the number of extracted particles. Since 2008 all the old aluminium cavities of the Ring Cyclotron have been replaced with new copper cavities. These allow higher voltage amplitudes and thus a greater acceleration of the protons per revolution. The number of revolutions of the protons in the cyclotron could thus be reduced from approx. 200 to 186, and the distance travelled by the protons in the cyclotron decreased from 6 km to 4 km. With a beam current of 2.2 mA, this proton facility at PSI is currently the most powerful continuous particle accelerator in the world. The 1.3 MW strong proton beam is directed towards the muon source (SμS) and the spallation neutron source (SINQ).

=== Swiss Muon Source (SμS) ===
In the middle of the large experimental hall, the proton beam of the Ring Cyclotron collides with two targets – rings of carbon. During the collisions of the protons with the atomic carbon nuclei, pions are first formed and then decay into muons after about 26 billionths of a second. Magnets then direct these muons to instruments used in materials science and particle physics. Thanks to the Ring Cyclotron's enormously high proton current, the muon source is able to generate the world's most intense muon beams. These enable researchers to conduct experiments in particle physics and materials science that cannot be carried out anywhere else.

The Swiss Muon Source (SμS) has seven beamlines that scientists can use to investigate various aspects of modern physics. Some materials scientists use them for muon spin spectroscopy experiments. PSI is the only place in the world where a muon beam of sufficient intensity is available at a very low energy of only a few kiloelectron volts – thanks to the Muon Source's high muon intensity and a special process. The resulting muons are slow enough to be used to analyse thin layers of material and surfaces. Six measuring stations (FLAME (from 2021), DOLLY, GPD, GPS, HAL-9500, and LEM) with instruments for a wide range of applications are available for such investigations.

Particle physicists are using some of the beamlines to perform high-precision measurements to test the limits of the Standard Model.

=== Swiss Spallation Neutron Source (SINQ) ===
The neutron source SINQ, which has been in operation since 1996, was the first, and is still the strongest, of its kind. It delivers a continuous neutron flux of 10^{14} n cm^{−2}s^{−1}. In SINQ the protons from the large particle accelerator strike a lead target and knock the neutrons out of the lead nuclei, making them available for experiments. In addition to thermal neutrons, a moderator made of liquid deuterium also enables the production of slow neutrons, which have a lower energy spectrum.

The MEGAPIE Target (Megawatt Pilot-Experiment) came into operation in summer 2006. By replacing the solid target with a target made of a lead-bismuth eutectic, the neutron yield could be increased by about another 80%.

Since it would be very costly to dispose of the MEGAPIE target, PSI decided in 2009 not to produce another such target and instead to develop the solid target further as it had already proven its worth. Based on the findings from the MEGAPIE project, it was possible to obtain almost as large an increase in neutron yield for operation with a solid target.

SINQ was one of the first facilities to use specially developed optical guide systems to transport slow neutrons. Metal-coated glass conduits guide neutrons over longer distances (a few tens of metres) by means of total reflection, analogous to the light guidance in glass fibres, with a low loss of intensity. The efficiency of these neutron guides has steadily increased with advances in manufacturing technology. This is why PSI decided to carry out a comprehensive upgrade in 2019. When SINQ goes back into operation in summer 2020, it will be able to provide, on average, five times more neutrons for experiments, and in a special case, even 30 times more.

SINQ's 15 instruments are not only used for PSI research projects but are also available for national and international users.

=== Ultracold Neutron Source (UCN) ===
Since 2011, PSI has also been operating a second spallation neutron source for the generation of ultracold neutrons (UCN). Unlike SINQ, it is pulsed and uses HIPA's full beam, but normally only for 8 seconds every 5 minutes. The design is similar to that of SINQ. In order to cool down the neutrons, however, it uses frozen deuterium at a temperature of 5 Kelvin (corresponding to −268 degrees Celsius) as a cold moderator. The UCN generated can be stored in the facility and observed for a few minutes in experiments.

=== COMET cyclotron ===
This superconducting 250 MeV cyclotron has been in operation for proton therapy since 2007 and provides the beam for treating tumours in cancer patients. It was the first superconducting cyclotron worldwide to be used for proton therapy. Previously, part of the proton beam from the Ring Cyclotron was split off for this purpose, but since 2007 the medical facility has been producing its own proton beam independently, which supplies several irradiation stations for therapy. Other components of the facility, the peripheral equipment and the control systems have also been improved in the meantime, so that today the facility is available over 98 percent of the time with more than 7000 operating hours per year.

=== Swiss Light Source (SLS) ===
The Swiss Light Source (SLS), an electron synchrotron, has been in operation since 1 August 2001. It works like a kind of combined X-ray machine and microscope to screen a wide variety of substances. In the circular structure, the electrons move on a circular path 288 m in circumference, emitting synchrotron radiation in a tangential direction. A total of 350 magnets hold the electron beam on its course and focus it. Acceleration cavities ensure that the beam's speed remains constant.

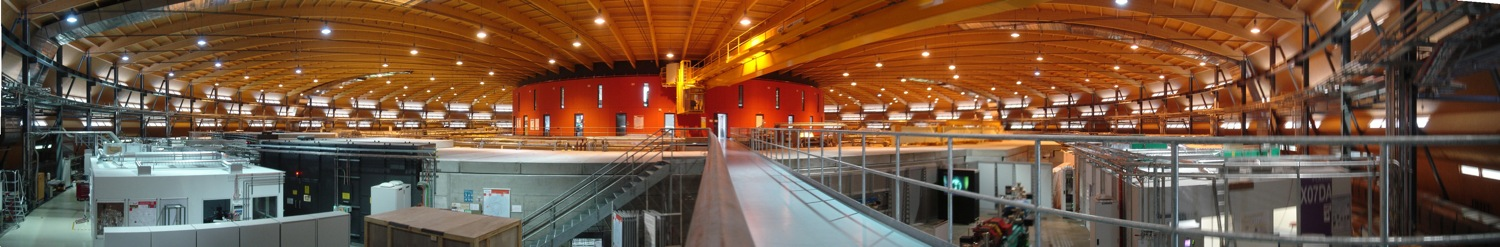
Panoramic view of the Swiss Light Source

Since 2008, the SLS has been the accelerator with the thinnest electron beam in the world. PSI researchers and technicians have been working on this for eight years and have repeatedly adjusted each of the many magnets. The SLS offers a very broad spectrum of synchrotron radiation from infrared light to hard X-rays. This enables researchers to take microscopic pictures inside objects, materials and tissue to, for example, improve materials or develop drugs.

In 2017, a new instrument at the SLS made it possible to look inside a computer chip for the first time without destroying it. Structures such as 45 nanometre narrow power lines and 34 nanometre high transistors became visible. This technology enables chip manufacturers to, for example, check whether their products comply with the specifications more easily.

Currently, under the working title "SLS 2.0", plans are being made to upgrade the SLS and thus create a fourth-generation synchrotron light source.

In 2024, researchers at PSI used the SLS to set a new world record for X-ray imaging precision, achieving a resolution of four nanometres through a technique called ptychography. The work, conducted in collaboration with EPFL, ETH Zurich, and the University of Southern California, enabled high-resolution 3D imaging of a computer chip and was published in Nature. This advancement has potential applications in both information technology and the life sciences.

=== SwissFEL ===
The SwissFEL free-electron laser was officially opened on 5 December 2016 by the Federal Councillor Johann Schneider-Ammann. In 2018, the first beamline ARAMIS came into operation. The second beamline ATHOS is scheduled to follow in autumn 2020. Worldwide, only four comparable facilities are in operation.

== Training Centre ==
The PSI Education Centre has over 30 years of experience in training and providing further education in technical and interdisciplinary fields. It trains over 3,000 participants annually.

The centre offers a wide range of basic and advanced training courses for both professionals and others working with ionising radiation or radioactive materials. The courses, in which participants acquire the relevant expertise, are recognised by the Federal Office of Public Health (FOPH) and the Swiss Federal Nuclear Safety Inspectorate (ENSI).

It also runs basic and advanced training courses for PSI's staff and interested individuals from the ETH Domain. Since 2015, courses on human resources development (such as conflict management, leadership workshops, communication and transferable skills) have also been held.

The quality of the PSI Education Centre is certified (ISO 29990:2001).

== Cooperation with industry ==
PSI holds about 100 active patent families in, for example, medicine, with investigation techniques for proton therapy against cancer or for the detection of prions, the cause of mad cow disease. Other patent families are in the field of photoscience, with special lithography processes for structuring surfaces, in the environmental sciences for recycling rare earths, for catalysts or for the gasification of biomass, in the materials sciences and in other fields. PSI maintains its own technology transfer office for patents.

Patents have, for example, been granted for detectors used in high-performance X-ray cameras developed for the Swiss Synchrotron Light Source SLS, which can be used to investigate materials at the atomic level. These provided the basis for founding the company DECTRIS, the largest spin-off to date to emerge from PSI. In 2017, the Lausanne-based company Debiopharm licensed the active substance 177Lu-PSIG-2, which was developed at the Centre for Radiopharmaceutical Sciences at PSI. This substance is effective in treating a type of thyroid cancer. It is to be further developed under the name DEBIO 1124 with the aim to have it approved and get it ready for market launch. Another PSI spin-off, GratXray, works with a method based on phase contrasts in lattice interferometry. The method was originally developed to characterize synchrotron radiation and is expected to become the gold standard in screening for breast cancer. The new technology has already been used in a prototype that PSI developed in collaboration with Philips.

== See also ==
- Science and technology in Switzerland
- Swiss Innovation Park
- Proton therapy
