= Schmitz =

Schmitz is a common German surname (smith).

== People ==
- Amy J. Schmitz, American legal scholar
- André Schmitz (1929–2016), Belgian poet
- Andreas Schmitz (born 1971), German herpetologist
- Arnold Schmitz (1893–1980), German musicologist, Beethoven researcher
- Barbara Schmitz, German Roman Catholic theologian
- Becky Schmitz, American politician
- Benno Schmitz (born 1994), German footballer
- Bill Schmitz (1954–2013), American football coach
- Bram Schmitz (born 1977), Dutch road cyclist
- Bruno Schmitz (1858–1916), German architect
- Carl Schmitz-Pleis (1877–1943), German painter
- Danny Schmitz (born 1955), American college baseball coach
- David F. Schmitz (born 1956), American historian
- Dennis Schmitz (1937–2019), American poet
- Edouard Schmitz (born 1999), Swiss Olympic equestrian
- Elisabeth Schmitz (1893–1977), German Lutheran theologian and teacher
- Elizabeth Schmitz (1938–2024), Dutch politician
- Else Schmitz-Gohr (1901–1987) German composer and pianist
- Ernst Johann Schmitz (1845–1922), German naturalist, ornithologist, entomologist and Roman Catholic priest
- Eugen Schmitz (1882–1959), German musicologist and music critic
- Eugene Schmitz (1864–1928), mayor of San Francisco at the time of the 1906 earthquake
- Ferdinand Schmitz (1919–1981), German wrestler
- Frank Schmitz (1945–1966), American trampoline gymnast
- Fred Schmitz (1820–1905), American musician and farmer
- Greg Dean Schmitz (born 1970), American online film journalist
- Gregor Peter Schmitz (born 1979), German journalist
- Hannah Schmitz (born 1985), British engineer
- Hans Schmitz, multiple people
- Hector Aron Schmitz or Ettore Schmitz (1861–1928), birthname of the Italian author Italo Svevo
- Heinz Schmitz (1928–1999), German field hockey player
- Helene Schmitz, Swedish photographer
- Hendrik Schmitz (born 1978), German politician
- Herbert Schmitz (1947–2019), German motocross racer
- Herman Schmitz, French composer
- Hermann Schmitz (1881–1960), German industrialist and Nazi war criminal
- Hermann Schmitz (entomologist) (1878–1960), German entomologist
- Hermann Schmitz (philosopher) (1928–2021), German philosopher
- Inge Schmitz-Feuerhake (born 1935), German physicist and mathematician
- Ingeborg Schmitz (1922–1985), German swimmer
- Jean-Pierre Schmitz (1932–2017), Luxembourgish road bicycle racer
- Jim Schmitz, multiple people
- Johannes Andreas Schmitz (1621–1652), Dutch physician
- John Schmitz, multiple people
- Joseph Schmitz, multiple people
- Julian Schmitz (1881–1943), American gymnast and track and field athlete
- Karl Schmitz-Scholl (1868–1933), German businessman, merchant and controlling shareholder
- Kathryn H. Schmitz, American exercise physiologist
- Kenneth L. Schmitz (1922–2017), Canadian philosopher
- Kim Schmitz (born 1974), German entrepreneur
- Leonhard Schmitz (1807–1890), German-born classical scholar and educator active mainly in the United Kingdom
- Lisa Schmitz (born 1992), German footballer
- Lucas Schmitz (born 1994), German politician
- Ludwig Schmitz (1884–1954), German film actor
- Lukas Schmitz (born 1988), German professional footballer
- Manfred Schmitz (1939–2014), German composer and pianist
- Marc Schmitz (born 1963), German artist
- Marco Schmitz (born 1979), German politician
- Maria Schmitz (1875–1962), German teacher, persistent campaigner and politician
- Marlene Schmitz-Portz (born 1938), German athlete
- Maurits Schmitz (born 1993), German football player
- Mike Schmitz (born 1974), American Catholic priest, speaker, author and podcaster
- Mike Schmitz (politician), American business leader and certified public accountant
- Nicole Schmitz (born 1988), Filipino model and beauty titleholder
- Norbert Schmitz (1958–1998), German footballer
- Oliver Schmitz (born 1960), South African film director
- Oscar A. H. Schmitz (1873–1931), German writer
- Peter Schmitz (born 1954), United Nations official
- Peter Schmitz (composer) (1895–1964), German composer
- Pierre Schmitz (1920–2004), Luxembourgish gymnast
- Rafael Schmitz (born 1980), Brazilian footballer
- Ralf Schmitz (born 1974), German actor
- Reinhard Schmitz (born 1951), German footballer
- Richard Schmitz (1885–1954), mayor of Vienna, Austria
- Robert Schmitz, multiple people
- Rolf Martin Schmitz (born 1957), German manager and former CEO
- Rudolf Michael Schmitz (born 1957), German Catholic prelate
- Sabine Schmitz (1969–2021), German race driver
- Sammy Schmitz (born 1980), American amateur golfer
- Sascha Schmitz (born 1972), German pop singer
- Sigrid Schmitz (born 1961), German behavioral physiologist
- Sybille Schmitz (1909–1955), German actress
- Tara Schmitz (born 1998), German ice hockey player
- Ted Schmitz, Canadian football executive, coach and broadcaster
- Thea Schmitz (1927–1990), Australian librarian
- Tilo Schmitz, German voice actor
- Timothy L. Schmitz (born 1965), American politician
- Toby Schmitz (born 1977), Australian actor, playwright, director and novelist
- Todd Schmitz (born 1978), American swimming coach
- Torsten Schmitz (born 1964), German boxer

== Places ==
- Schmitz Lake, lake in South Dakota
- Schmitz Park
- Schmitz Park Creek
