= Tollius =

Tollius is a surname. Notable people with the surname include:

- Bartha Hermina Tollius (1780–1847), amateur Dutch pastellist
- Cornelius Tollius (c. 1628–1654), Dutch scholar
- Herman Tollius (1742–1822), Dutch philologist and historian
- Jacobus Tollius (1633–1696), Dutch classicist
