= Johannes Teyssen =

German manager (born 1959)

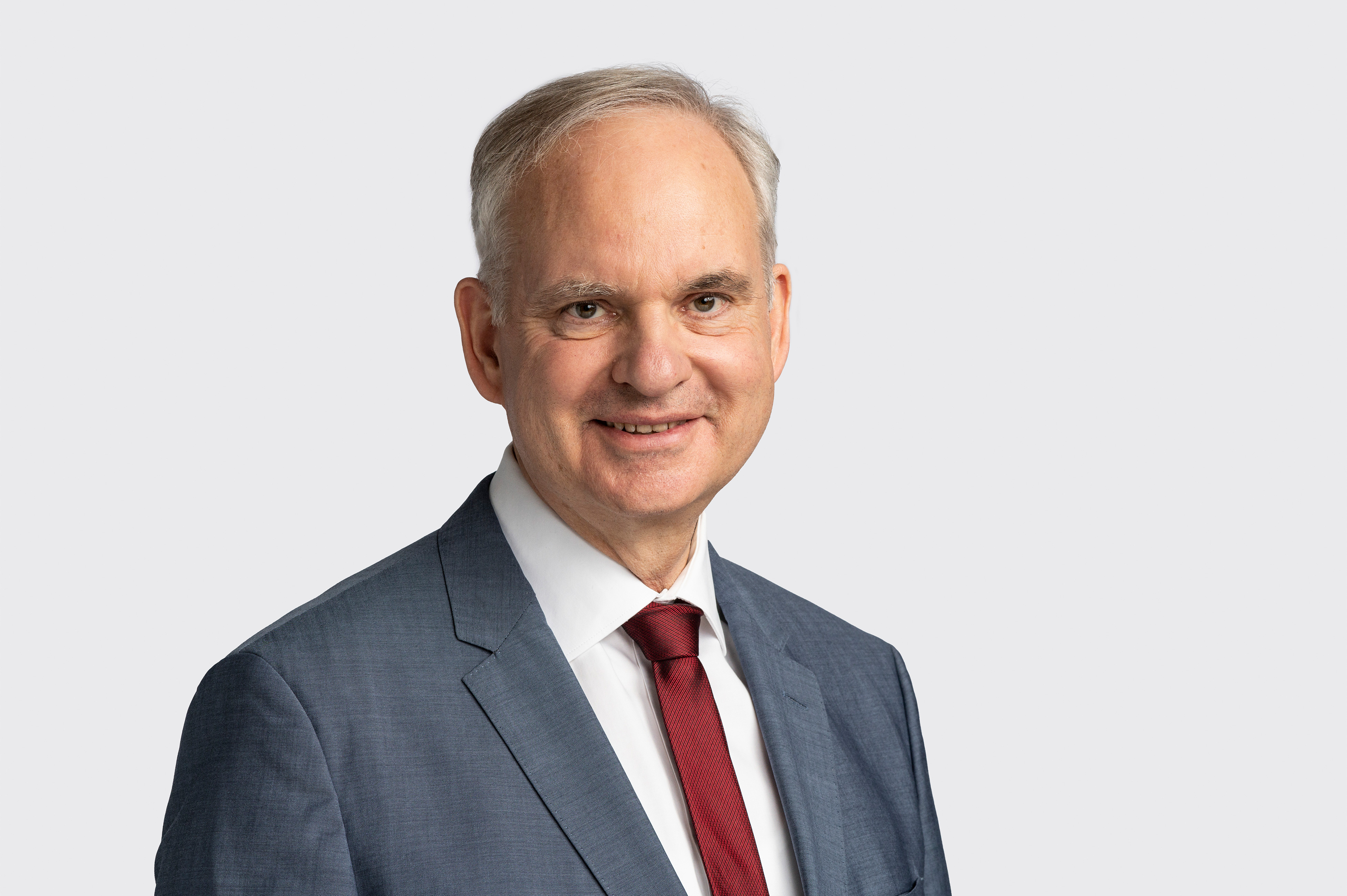
- Teyssen in 2022
- Born: 9 October 1959 (age 67); Hildesheim, Germany
- Education: University of Göttingen
- Occupation: Business executive
- Spouse: Married
- Children: 4

Johannes Teyssen (born 9 October 1959) is a German economist and lawyer who was the chief executive of E.ON, a German multinational electric utility company, from 2010 to 2021. Since January 2021, he has been a non-executive director of BP plc; since October 2021, a senior advisor at Kohlberg Kravis Robertsand since May 2026, chairman of the Supervisory Board of Deutsche Lufthansa AG. From 2022 until October 2026 he was chairman of Swiss energy group Alpiq Holding.

== Early life ==
Teyssen was born on 9 October 1959 in Hildesheim, Germany. He went on to study economics and law in Freiburg and at the University of Göttingen from where he graduated in 1984. He then went on to pursue doctoral studies in Boston, US, but returned to Germany to finish in 1991, earning a Doctor of Jurisprudence degree. His research included comparative law work on the relationship between the legislative and judicial branches of criminal procedure law.

== Career ==
Teyssen's first career role was as a law clerk at the State Superior Court in Celle, Germany. He stayed in that position until he joined PreussenElektra in Hanover in 1989, where most recently he was Head of the Legal Department. In 1991 he was promoted by PreussenElektra to head of energy and corporate law. In 1994, he earned another promotion, this time as head of legal affairs.

In 1998, Teyssen joined the Hanover-based power company Hastra in his first executive position as member of the board. In the course of the merger of Hastra and four other energy supply companies to form Avacon, based in Helmstedt, he was appointed chairman of the Board of Management of the new company in 1999, the majority (64.6 percent) of which is owned by E.ON Energie AG, which was formed in July 2000.

In 2001, Teyssen moved to E.ON Energie AG and was responsible for the finance department. Two years later, he became chief executive officer (CEO). In 2005 he was promoted to chief operating officer and deputy chairman of the board for E.ON Ruhrgas AG and E.ON Energy Trading AG. At the beginning of August 2009 it was announced that Teyssen would replace Wulf Bernotat as CEO with effect from May 1, 2010. In September 2017, it was announced that Johannes Teyssen's contract would be extended early by a further 3 years, i.e. until the end of 2021.

His tenure was marked by decisions concerning Germany's switch to renewable energy, which he cited as a huge opportunity. In January 2012, he spoke out against the European Union Emission Trading Scheme (EU ETS) and in 2013, he questioned the profitability of gas-fired plants.

In August 2010, Teyssen and around 40 other prominent figures signed the Energy Policy Appeal for an extension of the operating lives of German nuclear power plants. In 2017, Teyssen, along with other representatives of the energy industry and Germany's Economics Minister Brigitte Zypries, signed the agreement on financing the nuclear phase-out, which finally settled the dispute over the peaceful use of nuclear energy in Germany.

June 3, 2013 Teyssen was elected President of Eurelectric, the representative body of the European electricity industry.

At the end of 2014, he announced the spin-off of E.ON SE's conventional power generation business and international energy trading to the newly founded Uniper SE, which was successfully listed on the stock exchange in 2016. In March 2018, together with Rolf Martin Schmitz, CEO of RWE AG, he announced the reorganization of the two groups. E.ON acquired the energy infrastructure and sales operations of Innogy SE, becoming Europe's largest energy network company and an energy supplier to about 50 million customers in more than 10 European countries. RWE acquired the renewables businesses of E.ON and Innogy, becoming one of Europe's three largest renewables players. Following approval by the antitrust authorities, the reorganization was completed in March 2020.

Teyssen was Norwegian Honorary Consul General until the end of 2020, responsible for the German states of North Rhine-Westphalia, Rhineland-Palatinate and Saarland.

In January 2021 he was appointed as non-executive member of the Board of Directors of BP plc, in October 2021 he became Senior Advisor at KKR, , in the beginning of 2022 he was appointed as chairman of the Board of Directors of the Swiss energy group Alpiq Holding.. On August, 27, 2026 was published, that he will leave Alpiq in Autumn 2026. On 15 October 2026, he passed on this function to his successor Alberto di Paoli.

In May 2026 he was appointed Chairman of the Supervisory Board of Lufthansa Group.

== Corporate board memberships ==
- Lufthansa, chairman of the supervisory board (since 2026)
- BP, Non-Executive Member of the Board of Directors (since 2021)
- Alpiq Holding, chairman of the Board of Directors (2022-2026)
- Innogy, chairman of the supervisory board (2019–2020)
- Deutsche Bank AG, Member of the supervisory board (2008–2018)
- Salzgitter AG, Member of the supervisory board (2006–2016)

== Personal life ==
Teyssen is married with four children. Together with his wife, he supports the Kunstpalast (formerly: Museum Kunstpalast) in Düsseldorf in the Stifterkreis and the Museum Folkwang in Essen in the Centennial Kreis. In 2015, Teysssen was a member of the search committee to select a new director of the Museum Kunstpalast.

His father, Hans Teyssen, was Vice President of the Higher Regional Court of Celle for many years and most recently Ministerial Director in the Lower Saxony Ministry of Justice; his uncle, Anton Teyssen, was a member of the Christian Demokratic Union of the state parliament for Hildesheim for many years.
