= Cornelius Tollius =

Dutch scholar (c.1628–1654)

Cornelius or Cornelis Tollius (c. 1628 - 13 June 1654) was a Dutch scholar.

== Life ==
Tollius was born in Rhenen, the son of Johannes Tollius and his first wife Maria Gordon. He probably studied in Utrecht and certainly in Amsterdam under the friendly guidance of Gerhard Johann Vossius. With Gerhard's son Isaac Vossius, who in 1648 became court librarian in Uppsala, he went to Sweden as an amanuensis. His companion later accused him of having stolen some of his books. On 12 April 1648 Tollius was appointed professor of history and Greek at the University of Harderwijk, where he was also secretary of the College of Curators. In January 1654 he succeeded Georgius Hornius as professor of history, political science, and geography. Tollius died unexpectedly in Gouda, shortly after his marriage on 5 March to Margaretha van Kent, the daughter of the mayor of Gouda. He died in Gouda, still a young man, while his contemporaries had high expectations of him.

== Works ==
Tollius' publications include:

- Cornelii Tollii Ad Pierii Valeriani De literatorum infelicitate librum appendix (Amsterdam 1647) online (Harderwijk 1655 and Leipzig 1707, with Pietro Alcionio, Medices legatus sive de exilio Oratio de natura et constitutione verae Politices)
- Palæphati De Incredibilibvs, Greek text with Latin translation (Amsterdam 1649) online (translation reprinted by Martin Brunner, Uppsala 1663; by Thomas Gale, Opuscula Mythologica Ethica et Physica, Cambridge 1671, repr. Amsterdam 1688; and by Paulus Pater, Frankfurt 1685, 1686, 1687)
- Ioannis Cinnami De rebus gestis imperat. Constantinop. Joannis et Manuelis, Commenorum, historiar. libri IV, editio princeps with Latin translation (Utrecht 1652) online

A number of Tollius' orations were also published:

- Cornelii Tollii Adlocutio ad nobilissimum & magnificum dominum, Ioannem Wynbergium, supremae Gelriae curiae senatorem, ejusdem ducatus & comitatis Zutphaniae academiae curatorem, Hardervici consulem, sponsum: cum domum duceret nobilissimam, lectissimamque virginem, Gertrudim à Dedem, sponsam (Harderwijk 1647; to Johan van Wijnbergen, the mayor of Harderwijk)
- Oratio de pace inter Hispaniae regem Philippum et liberos ordines Belgii ipso publicationis die Harderovici habita (Amsterdam 1648)
- Cornelii Tollii Oratio in obitum incomparabilis, & illustris viri Gerardi Ioannis Vossii ... in inclito Amstelodamensium gymnasio professoris celeberrimi : habita .... XII aprilis MDCXLIX (Amsterdam 1649)
- Oratio in obitum Joh. Andr. Schmitzii in Acad. Harderov. Medic. Prof. (Harderwijk 1652)
