= Hydropower in Switzerland =

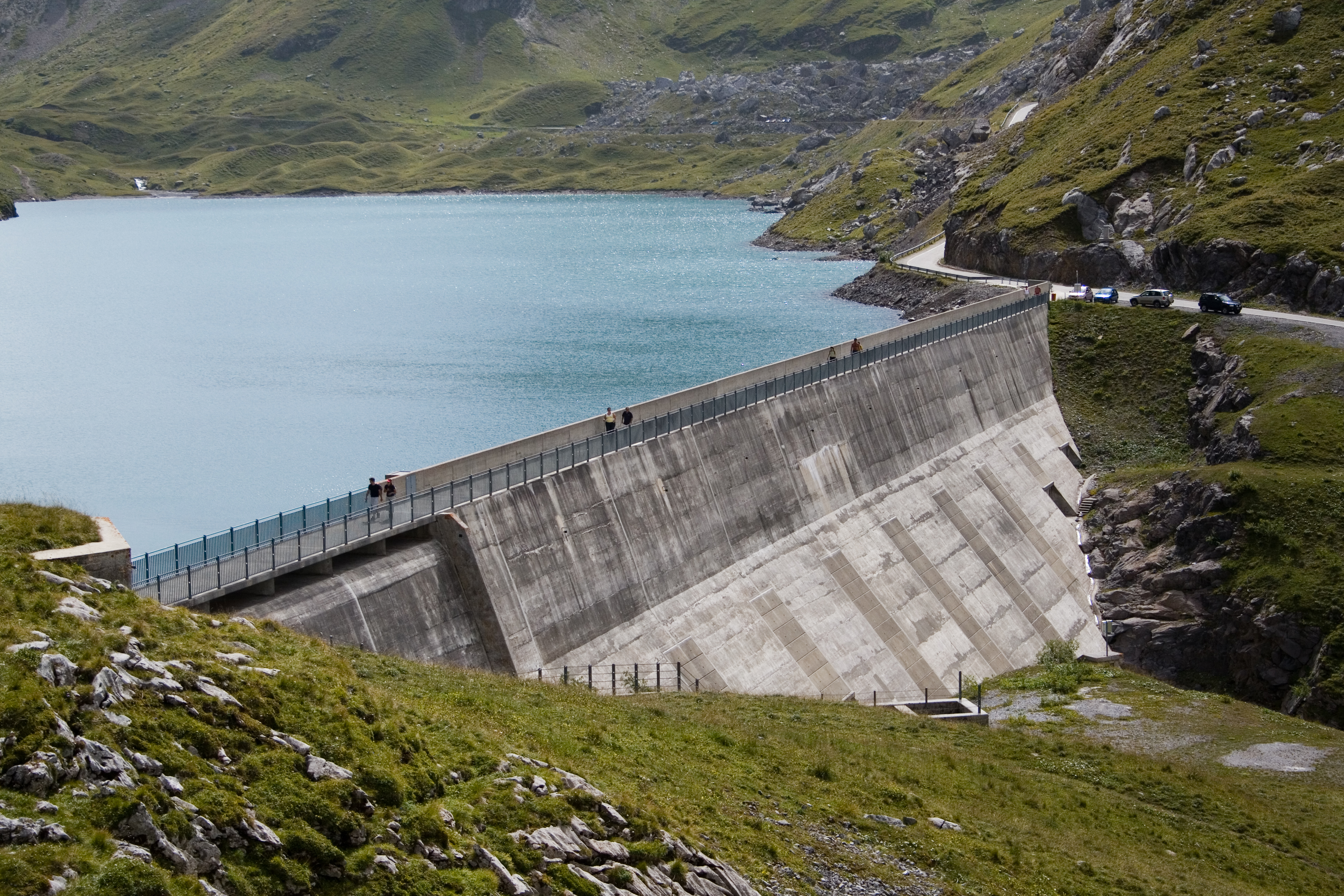
Sanetsch dam in the Bernese Alps.

In 2022, hydropower contributed 52.8% of the country's total electricity production and accounted for 54.6% of its electricity consumption.

In the same year, Switzerland ranked 6th in Europe for hydropower production, making up 6% of Europe's total output.

At the end of 2022, Switzerland's installed capacity in hydroelectric power stations will rank 6th in Europe, representing 6.9% of the European total. The country also ranked 6th in Europe for pumped storage power stations, with 7.8% of the European total.

== History ==
Switzerland's first hydroelectric dams date back to the 19th century: the Maigrauge dam built in Fribourg between 1870 and 1872 was Europe's first concrete dam; its power station (Oelberg) was built in 1910.

Switzerland's first hydroelectric power station (two 20-hp turbines) was built in 1882 at Couvaloup to provide lighting for Lausanne's cantonal hospital.

The 1950s and 1970s saw the construction of numerous large dams, particularly in the Alps.

== Production ==
According to the International Hydropower Association, Swiss hydropower production amounted to 34 TWh in 2022, or 0.8% of the world total; in Europe, Switzerland ranks 6th with 6.0% of the European total, behind Norway (22.7%), Sweden (12.3%), Turkey (11.6%), France (8.8%) and Austria (6.3%).

In 2021, Swiss hydropower production accounted for 0.9% of the world total and ranked 7th in Europe with 5.7% of the European total.

Swiss hydropower plants produced 33.5 TWh in 2022, down 15.2%, or 52.8% of the country's net electricity production and 54.6% of its electricity consumption, compared with 39.5 TWh in 2021 (61.5% and 63.2%).

In 2019, Swiss hydropower production accounted for 0.9% of the world total, ranking 7th in Europe with 6.2% of the European total.

In 2018, production stood at 37.78 TWh, or 0.9% of the world total, far behind China (1,232.9 TWh); in Europe, Switzerland ranked 6th with 5.9% of the European total, behind Norway (139.5 TWh), France (63.1 TWh), Sweden (60.9 TWh), Turkey (59.75 TWh) and Italy (49.28 TWh).

In 2015, Swiss hydropower plants generated 39,486 GWh of electricity, or 59.9% of the country's total electricity production. This production was divided between run-of-river power plants (42%) and storage power plants (58%).

Hydroelectric installations also consume electricity. Pumped storage involves pumping water downstream to fill upstream storage dams. In 2015, pumped storage consumed 2,296 GWh, or 3.5% of the country's electricity production.

Switzerland has 604 power stations with an output of 300 kW or more, producing an average of 36,031 GWh/year of electricity. Some 47.6% is generated by run-of-river power plants, 48% by storage power plants, and 4.4% by pumped storage power plants. Around 63% of total production comes from the Alpine cantons (Uri, Graubünden, Ticino, and Valais), but the cantons of Aargau and Berne also supply considerable quantities of hydroelectric power. International hydropower plants on border rivers account for 11% of total Swiss production.

Small-scale hydropower (power stations with a capacity ≤ 10 MW) has a long history in Switzerland, since there were already around 7,000 small hydroelectric power stations in operation at the beginning of the 20th century. However, lower-cost power generation in large-scale plants has led to the decommissioning of many of these facilities. In 2013, there were more than 1,000 small hydroelectric power plants in Switzerland, with an installed capacity of around 760 MW and an annual output of 3,400 GWh. Small hydropower still offers development potential of up to 2,200 GWh/year.

== Installed capacity ==
The installed capacity of Switzerland's hydroelectric power plants will reach 17,756 MW by the end of 2022; 6th in Europe, with 6.9% of the European total, behind Norway (13.1%), Turkey (12.4%), France (9.9%), Italy (8.8%) and Spain (7.9%), and 13th in the world, with 1.3% of the global total, far behind China (414,811 MW); pumped storage plants account for 25% of the total. Switzerland ranked 5th worldwide for commissioning in 2022, with the Nant de Drance 900 MW pumped storage plant.

Commissioning in 2021 totalled 12 MW. The Swiss government has identified a number of potential new sites and opportunities for dam extensions, which could bring an additional 2 TWh of production with minimal impact on biodiversity and landscapes.

Extensions completed in 2015 totalled 71 MW, and plants under construction at the end of 2015 represented an additional capacity of 2,486 MW.

Installed capacity was 13,745 MW in the 2014/2015 hydrological year, and the SFOE's forecasts for its development are 13,815 MW for 2015/2016, 15,350 MW for 2016/2017, and 16,300 MW for 2018/2019.

The SFOE divides the power plants into four categories, with their expected average power and output:

- Run-of-river: 3,941 MW, 17,312 GWh;
- Storage power plants (with reservoirs): 7,966 MW, 17,295 GWh;
- Mixed pumped storage: 1,383 MW, 1,567 GWh;
- Pure pumped storage: 469 MW.

Storage dams are reservoirs located at high altitudes. The turbines, installed lower down in the valley, are fed by penstocks, producing electricity thanks to the head of water between the dam and the turbine. The dam wall creates energy storage, which is transformed into electrical energy and regulated according to demand. Some storage facilities also use pumped storage. Water is pumped from the valley and raised to higher altitudes when consumption is low, to be turbined when consumption peaks.

The breakdown by canton and river basin is as follows:

Canton	Number of plants	Power MW	Production GWh
Zurich	14	128.74	595.41
Schaffhouse	4	47.53	279.55
Berne	64	1,346.33	3,346.15
Appenzell Rhodes-Extérieures	3	8.90	22.98
Lucerne	9	8.52	52.71
Appenzell Rhodes-Intérieures	1	3.87	10.76
Uri	23	494.02	1,528.77
Saint Gall	49	426.85	616.64
Schwyz	15	228.74	477.06
Grisons	103	2,703.17	7,889.38
Obwalden	12	116.60	311.49
Aargau	29	541.70	3,240.81
Nidwalden	6	45.32	158.97
Thurgau	11	10.73	60.37
Glarus	34	629.58	933.54
Ticino	33	1,450.36	3,547.39
Zoug	7	22.42	70.58
Vaud	24	334.71	814.02
Fribourg	13	267.56	608.43
Valais	117	4,577.85	9,679.27
Soleure	9	87.67	545.22
Neuchâtel	13	34.24	134.72
Basel-Stadt		47.29	261.61
Geneva	4	136.53	647.63
Basel-Landschaft	10	53.59	303.00
Jura	5	7.36	38.13
Total	612	13,760.17	36,174.58

Maximum available electrical power and expected average annual production, status at January 1, 2016.

Mountainous areas have made it possible to build large hydroelectric facilities, so that the cantons of Graubünden and Valais together account for almost half of production.

Basin	Number of plants	Power MW	Expected production GWh
Rhine	147	2,697.90	8,625.06
Aar	113	1,902.77	5,855.16
Reuss	68	708.00	2,324.30
Limmat	75	950.83	1,794.01
Rhône	142	5,009.39	10,764.13
Tessin	44	1,745.60	4,497.71
Adda	12	305.31	771.37
Inn	20	437.54	1,525.34
Adige	2	2.83	17.50
Total	623	13,760.17	36,174.58

Existing power plants classified by river basin, as of January 1, 2016.

== Energy policy ==
The 2008 Energy Act includes a feed-in tariff for hydroelectric power plants with a capacity of up to 10 MW.

With its Energy Strategy 2050, the Swiss government has set itself the target of increasing average annual electricity production from hydropower to 37.4 TWh/year by 2035 and 38.6 TWh/year by 2050.

"Among the first measures taken as part of the 2050 Energy Strategy, we note that large hydroelectric power plants (capacity greater than 10 MW), as well as significant renovations or expansions of hydroelectric power plants, will be eligible for investment contributions (up to 30% of investment costs); in addition, a market premium can be claimed for electricity produced by large Swiss hydroelectric power plants when it has to be sold on the market below cost price; this premium is capped at 1 ct/kWh and the resources available overall are limited; the measure is limited to five years. Finally, the courts will now have to give as much weight to the benefits of using renewable energies as they do to protecting nature and the landscape."

== Main dams ==
Main hydropower schemes in Switzerland

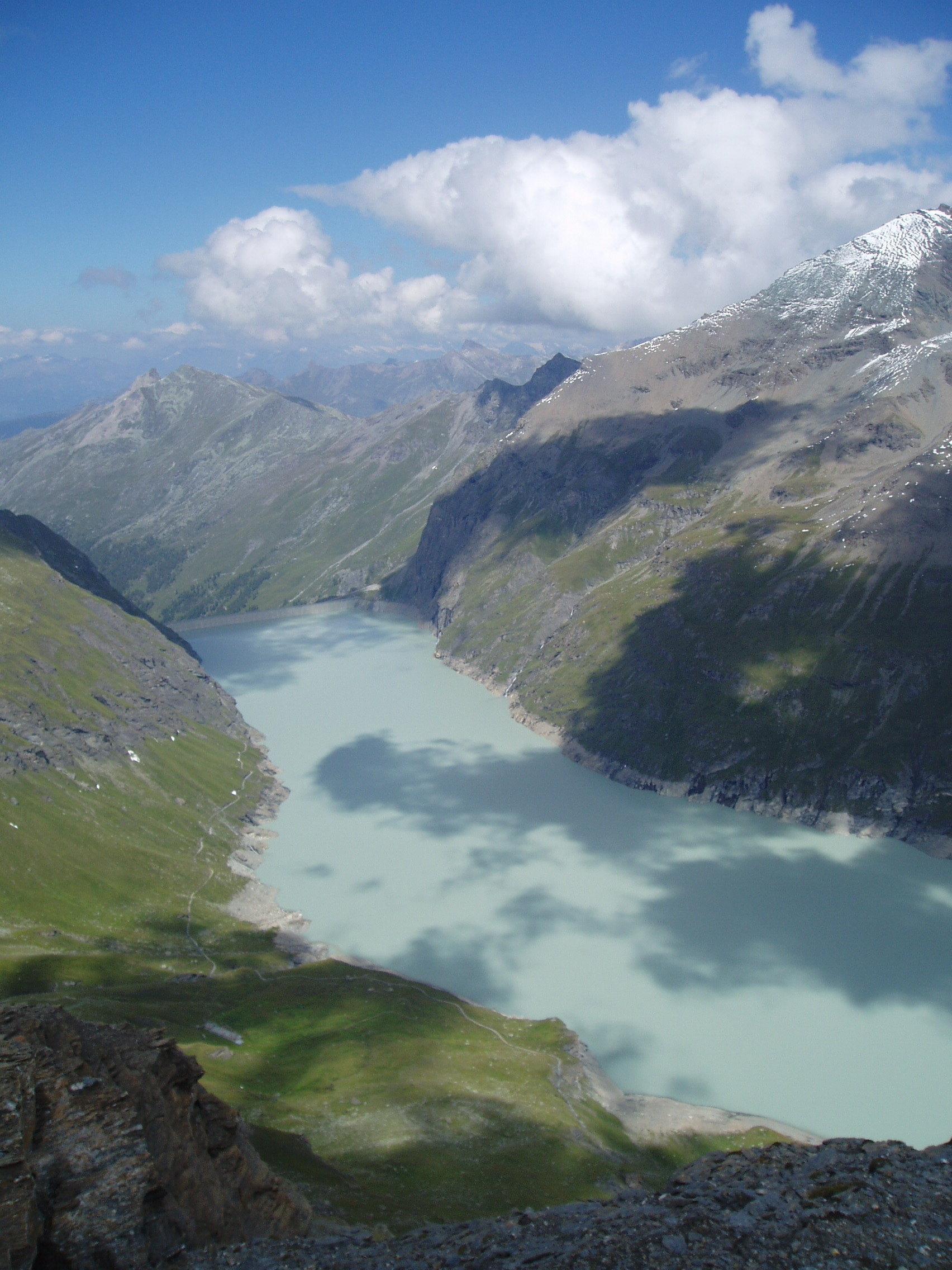
Grande Dixence and Lac des Dix.

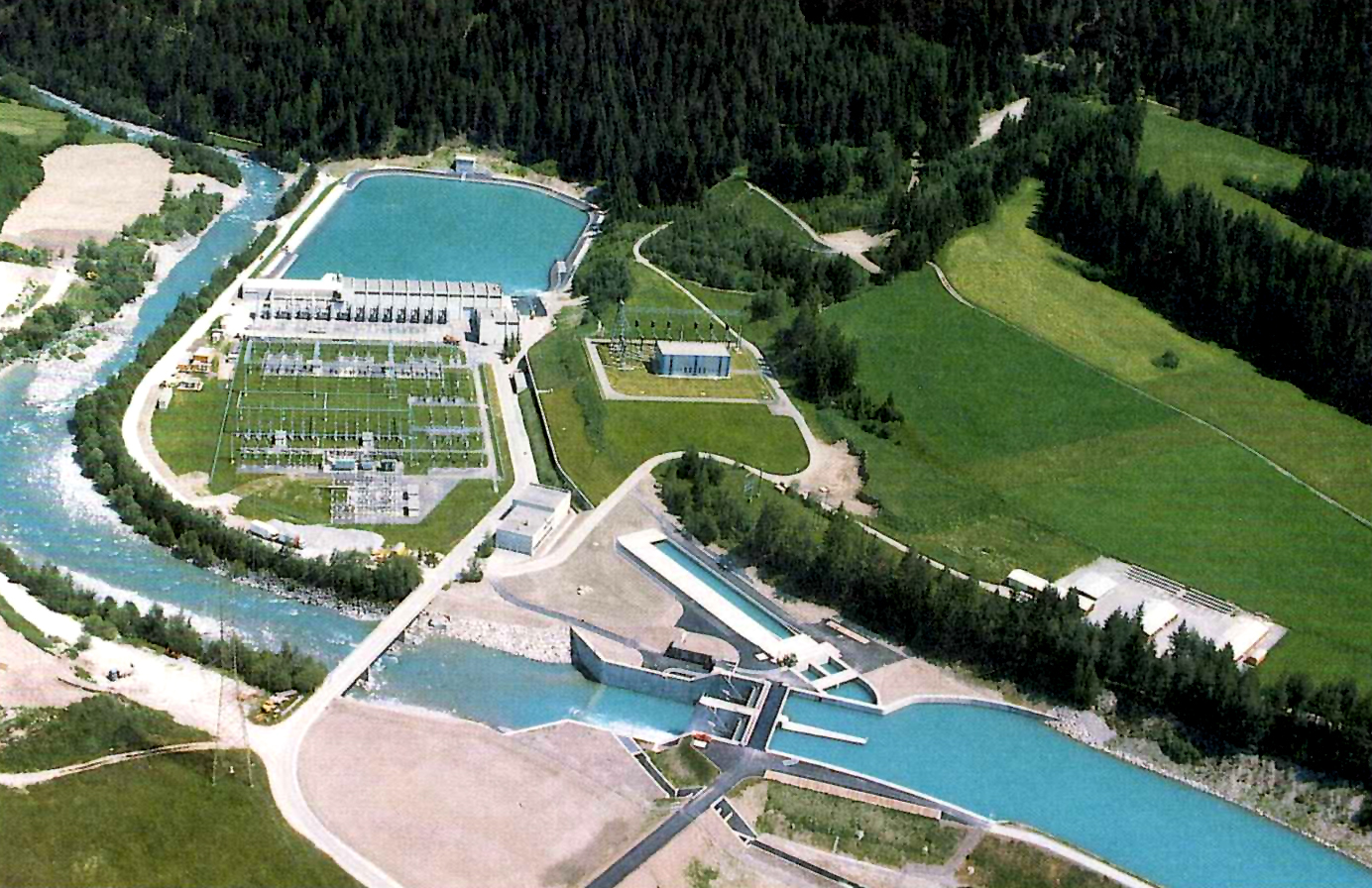
Pradella power station.

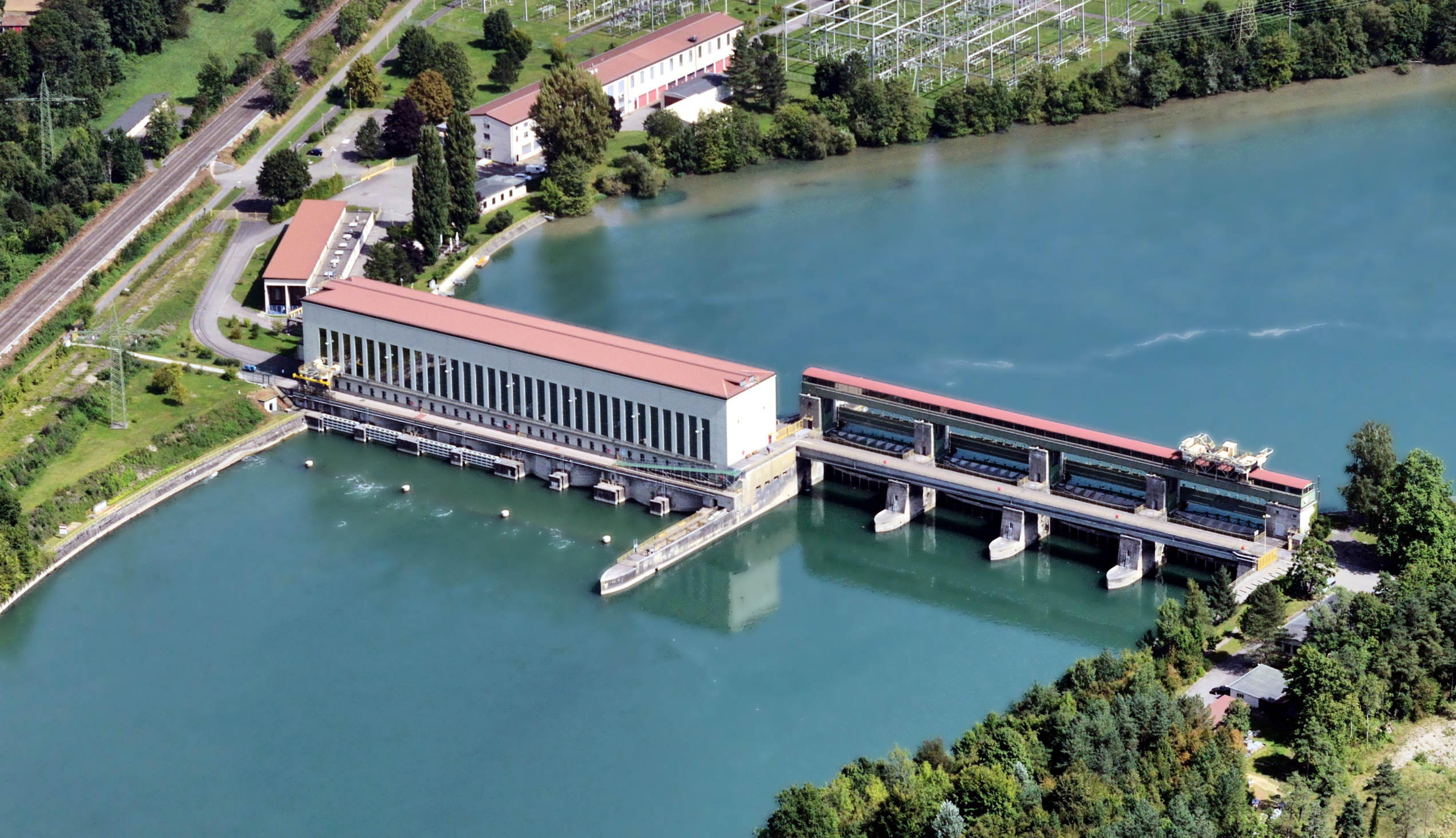
Centrale de Ryburg-Schwörstadt.

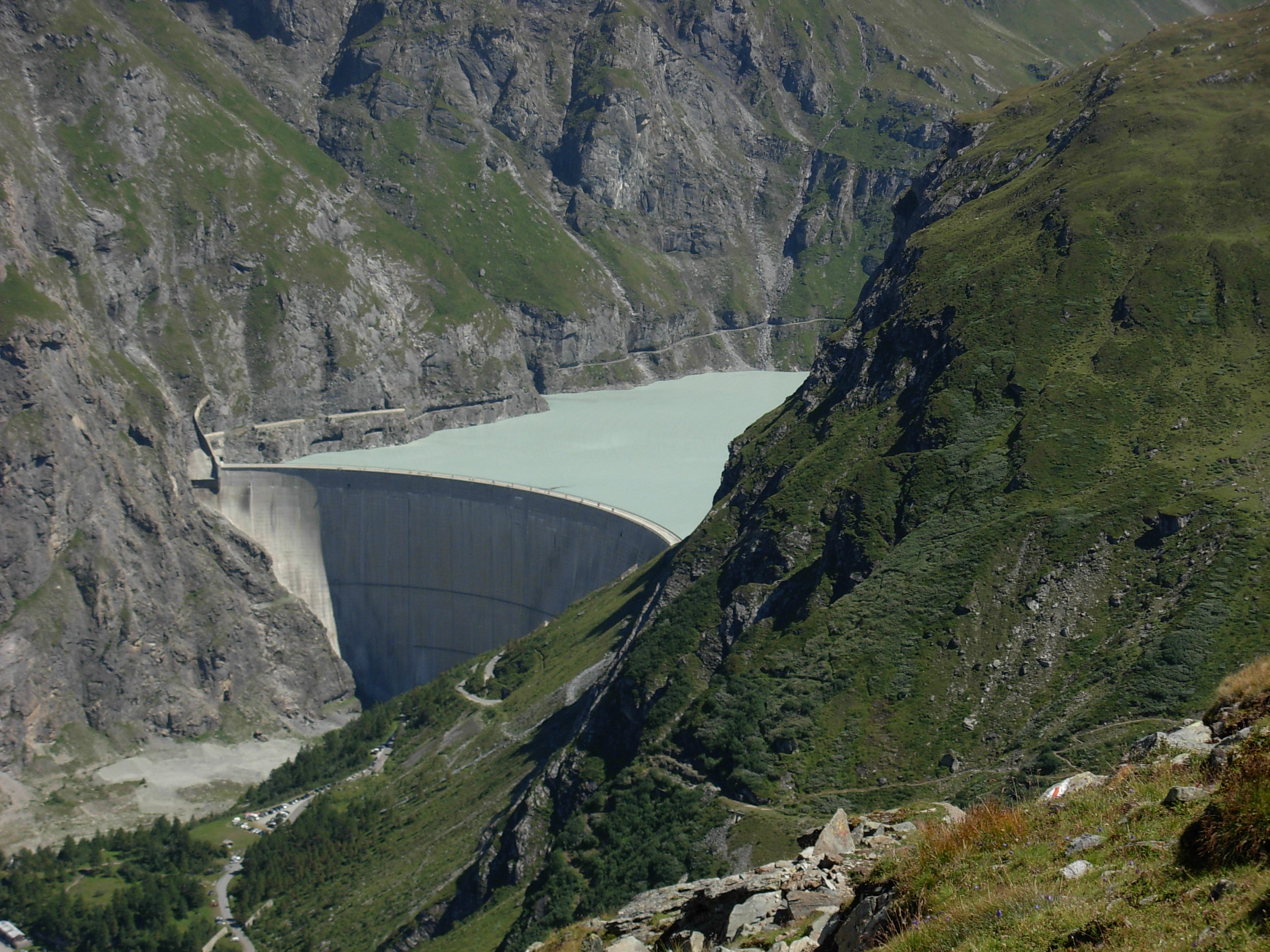
Mauvoisin Dam.

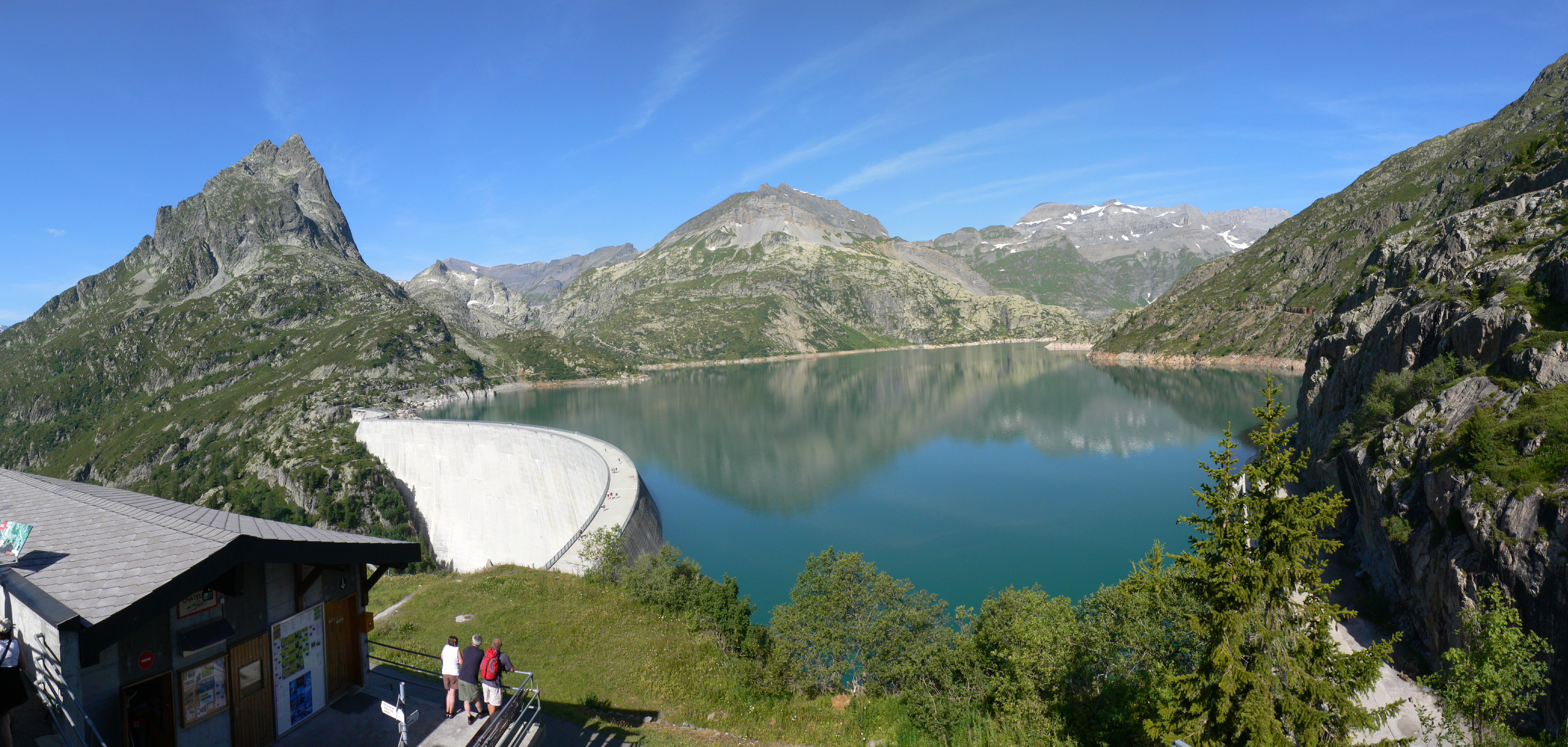
Émosson Dam.

As of 01.01.2016, Switzerland had 612 power stations with a capacity of 300 kW or more, totalling 13,760 MW and generating an average of 36,175 GWh/year; its most important hydroelectric schemes are:

- Grande Dixence (Bieudron 1,269 MW, Nendaz 390 MW, and Fionnay 290 MW), which produced 2,458 GWh in 2020, or 6.05% of the country's hydroelectric output.
- Pradella on the Inn (Engadine): 1,020 GWh.
- Rhine power stations on the border with Germany: Laufenburg 315 GWh, Ryburg-Schwörstadt 350 GWh and Rheinfelden 300 GWh, and Kembs in France 171 GWh (Swiss share of expected production).
- Mauvoisin: Riddes power station (225 MW, 688 GWh), Fionnay (138 MW) and Chanrion (28 MW).
- Émosson: production from the Émosson dam is shared half with France: 207.5 GWh at Martigny-La Bâtiaz and 205 GWh at Châtelard-Vallorcine (France).

== Pumped storage power plants ==
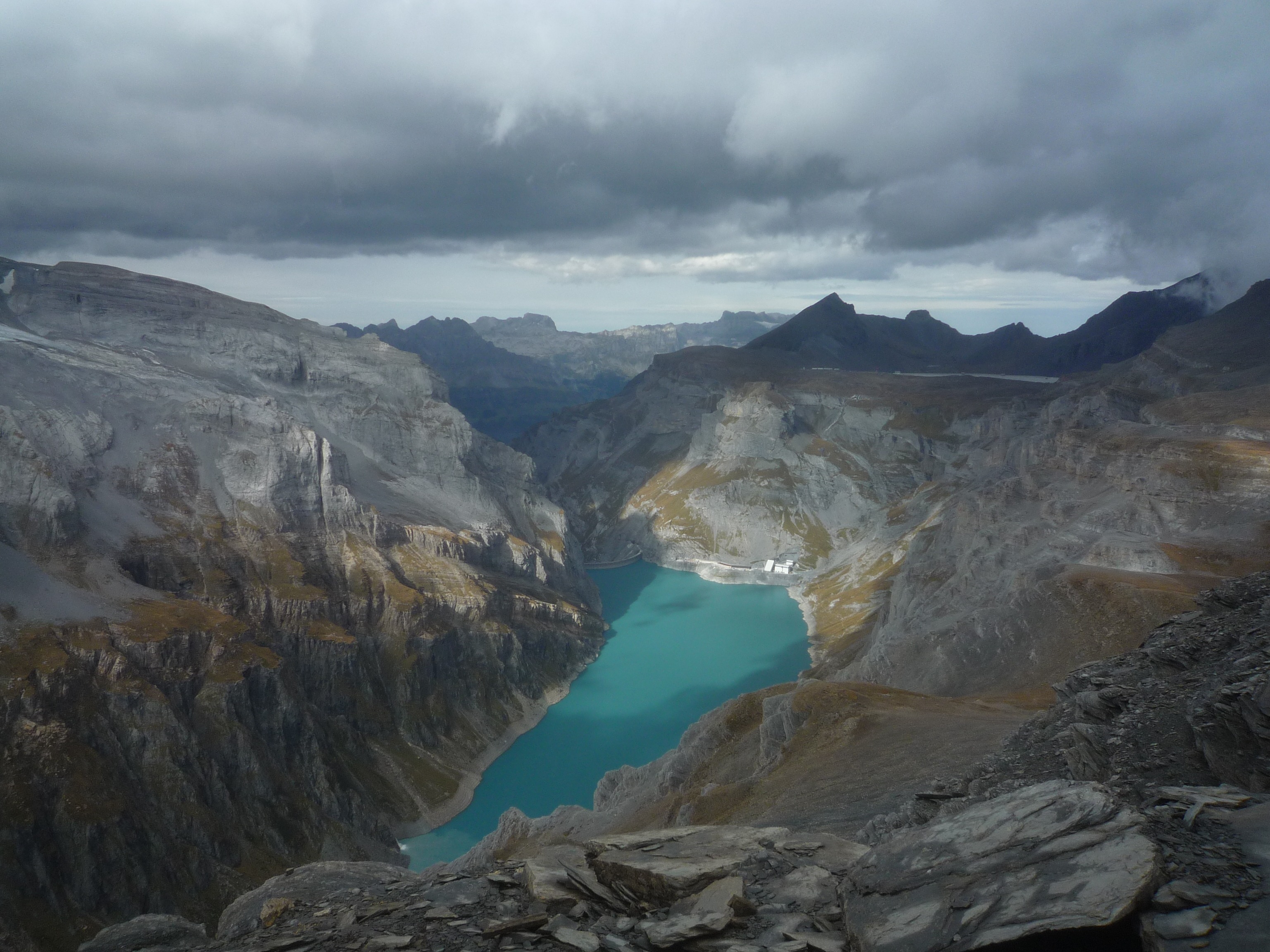
Lake Limmern and Muttsee dam top right, October 2014.

Switzerland ranks 6th in Europe for pumped storage power plants, with 4,419 MW in 2022, or 7.8% of the European total, compared with 7,891 MW in Italy, 6,414 MW in Germany, 6,164 MW in Spain, 5,596 MW in Austria and 5,050 MW in France. The Nant de Drance power plant (900 MW) was commissioned with 6 variable-speed Francis pump turbines and a storage capacity of 20 GWh.

In 2021, Switzerland ranked 6th in Europe for pumped storage power plants, with 3,029 MW, or 5.5% of the European total.

The second phase of the Hongrin-Léman pumped-storage project, also known as the Veytaux pumped-storage power plant, was completed in 2017, increasing the capacity of this 240 MW facility to 480 MW, the second most powerful in the country. It is located on the shore of Lake Geneva; its upper reservoir is Lac de l'Hongrin, 800 meters higher. The FMHL+ project involved the addition of two 120 MW units, installed in a new cavern; work began on April 7, 2011.

Switzerland's pumped storage capacity was increased by 1,000 MW in 2016 with the commissioning of the Linth-Limmern complex; it will be further increased by the Nant de Drance project (900 MW), which will be commissioned progressively from 2018; water will be pumped from Lac d'Emosson to Lac du Vieux-Emosson.

The Linth-Limmern complex in the Linth valley already included a 140 MW pumped storage power station between Lake Limmern and the Tierfehd power station, and was completed by the Linthal 2015 project, which adds 1,000 MW between Lakes Limmern and Mutt, 600 meters higher.

More than 3,000 MW were under construction at the end of 2015, including the Linthal 2015 project: extension of the lower and upper reservoirs and flow regulation for downstream power plants, and the Nant de Drance project; two other major projects are scheduled for 2019: Lago Bianco (900 MW) and Grimsel 3 (660 MW).

== See also ==
- Hydroelectricity
- Energy in Switzerland
- List of dams and reservoirs in Switzerland

== Bibliography ==
- Office fédéral de l'énergie (2021). Statistique Suisse de l'électricité 2020 (PDF).
