= Lac du Vieux Émosson =

Reservoir in Valais, Switzerland

Lac du Vieux Émoson
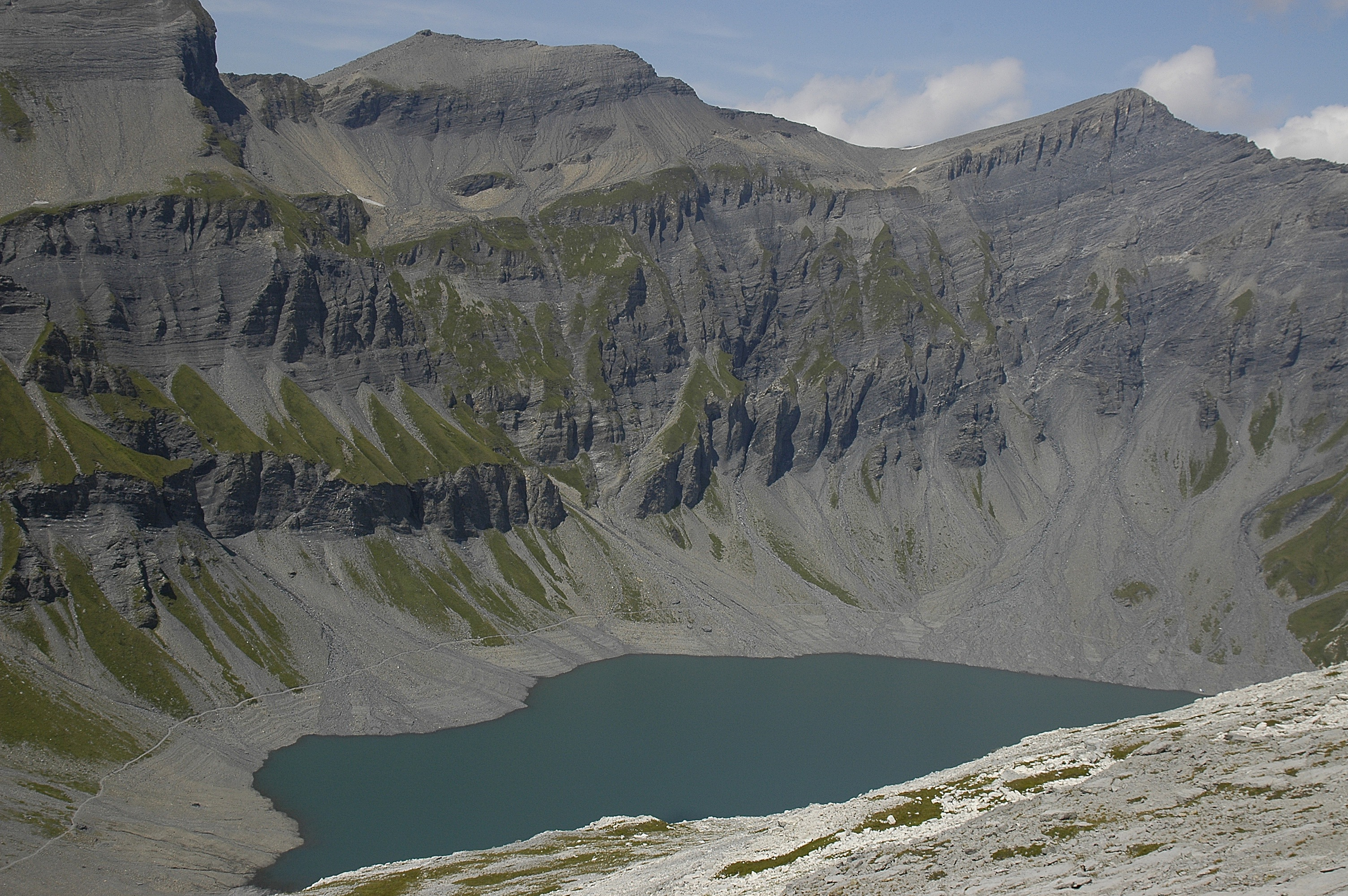

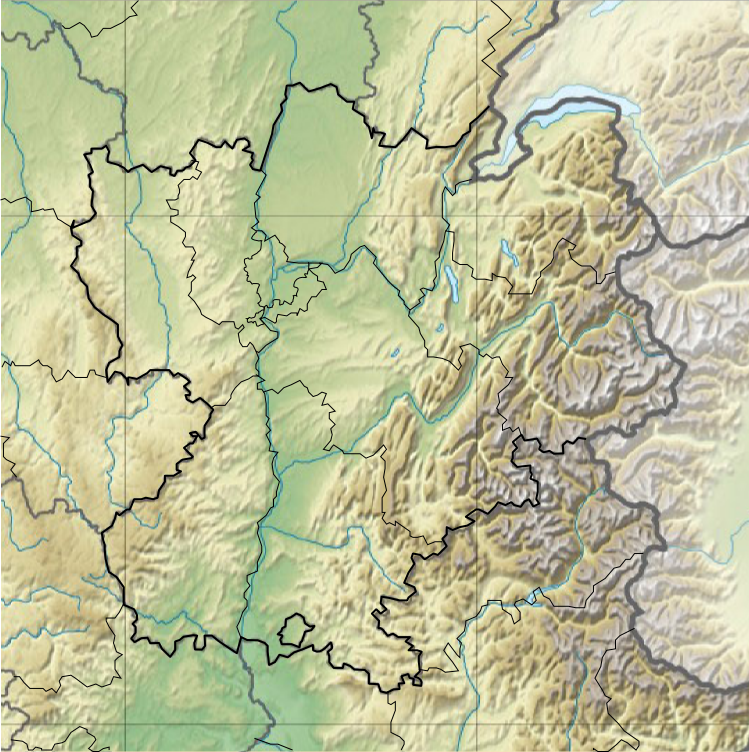
- Location within Canton of Valais Location within Rhône-Alpes Location within Switzerland Location within France Location within Alps
- Interactive map of Lac du Vieux Émoson
- Location: Valais
- Coordinates: 46°3′45″N 6°53′21″E
- Catchment area: 4.6 km^{2} (1.8 sq mi)
- Basin countries: Switzerland
- Max. length: 1.5 km (0.93 mi)
- Surface area: 0.55 km^{2} (0.21 sq mi)
- Max. depth: 42 m (138 ft)
- Water volume: 13.8 million cubic metres (11,200 acre⋅ft)
- Surface elevation: 2,205 m (7,234 ft)

Lac du Vieux Émosson (French pronunciation: [lak dy vjøz‿emɔsɔ̃]) is a reservoir in Valais, Switzerland, in the municipality of Finhaut at an elevation of 2205 m. The lake drains into the reservoir Lac d'Émosson, 300 m below.

In September 2014, an increase of the dam by 21.5 meters was completed. The capacity of the lake was thus doubled to 25 million m^{3}. The larger capacity is used for the Nant de Drance pumped storage plant, for which Lac du Vieux Emosson forms the upper basin and Emosson reservoir the lower basin. The storage power plant went into operation on 1 July 2022, after 14 years of construction. The construction of the plant cost the equivalent of 2 billion euros. The installed capacity is 900 MW, and 20 GWh can be stored.

The arch dam Vieux Émosson was completed in 1955. Efforts to raise the dam 20 m (66 ft) began in 2013. The lake forms the upper reservoir for the 900 MW Nant de Drance Hydropower Plant which began operations in 2022.

== See also ==
- List of lakes of Switzerland
- List of mountain lakes of Switzerland
