= Schmitz Park Bridge =

Road bridge in Seattle, Washington, United States

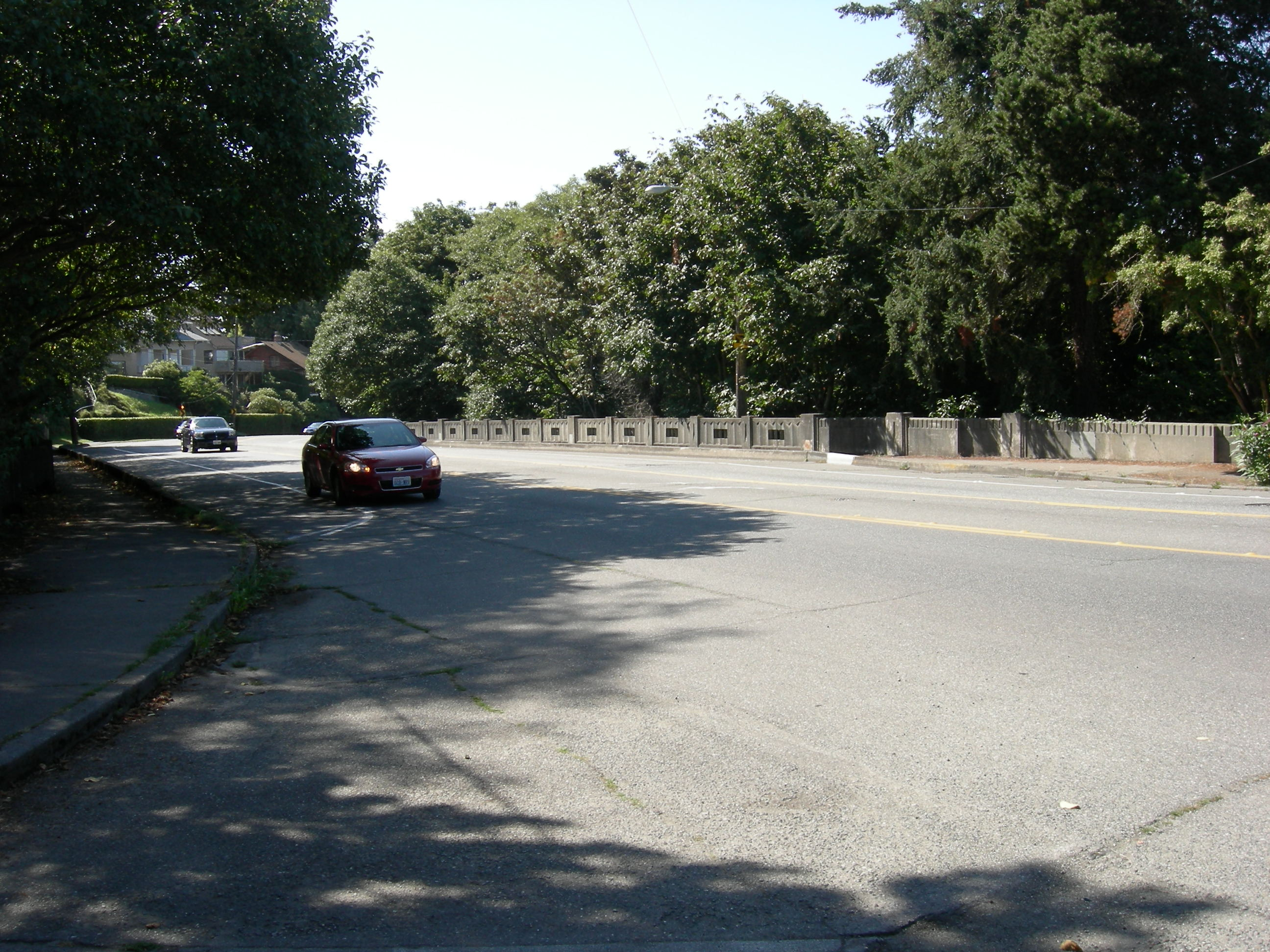
- Coordinates: 47°34′38″N 122°24′07″W

Characteristics
- Total length: 175-foot (53 m)

History
- Engineering design by: Clark Eldridge
- Construction end: 1936
- Schmitz Park Bridge
- U.S. National Register of Historic Places
- Seattle Landmark
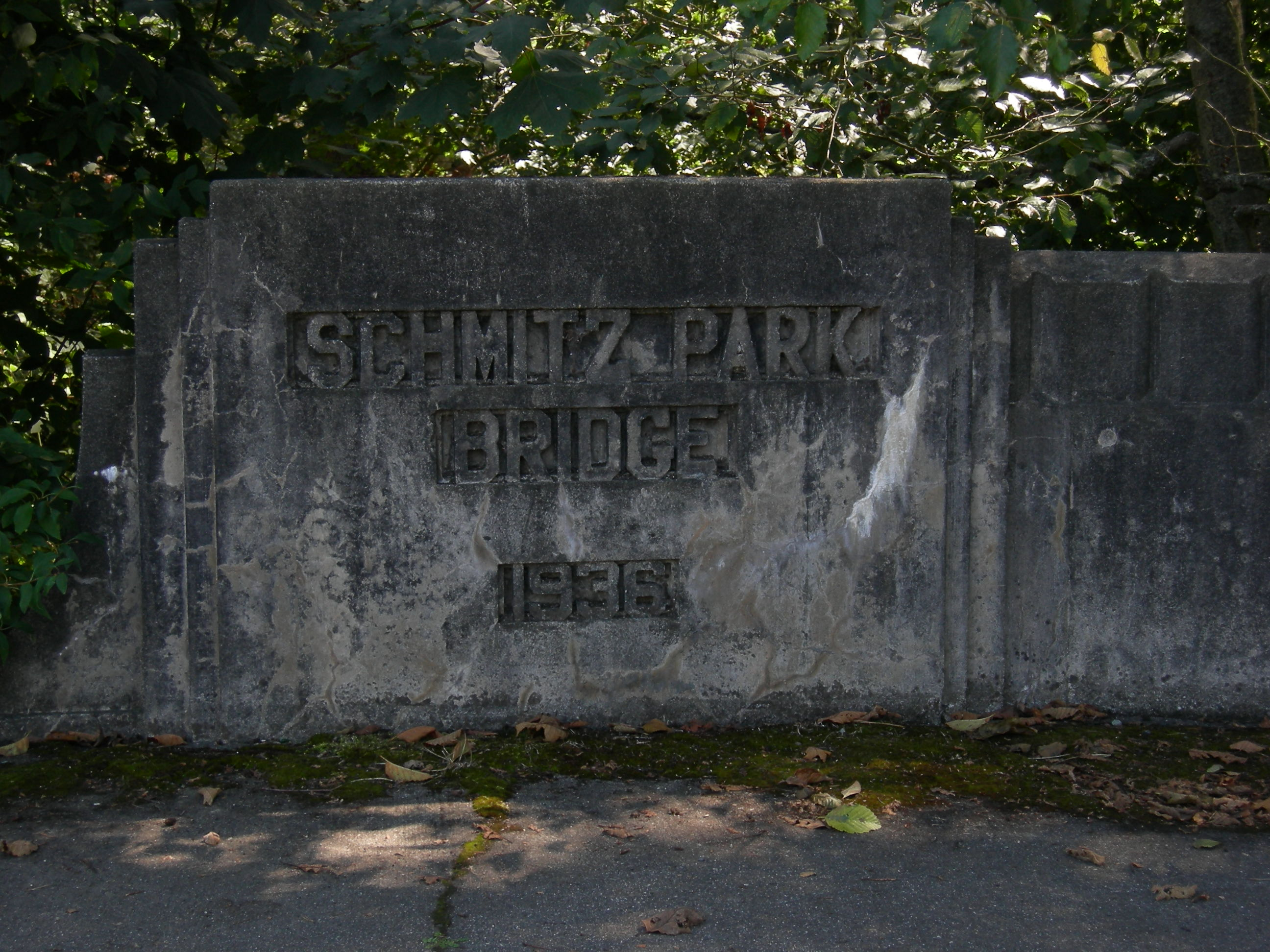

- Location within Washington (state) Location within the United States
- Location: Spans Schmitz Park Ravine, Seattle, Washington
- Coordinates: 47°34′38″N 122°24′8″W
- Built: 1935
- Architect: Clark Eldridge; Mahoney, J.
- Architectural style: Art Deco, rigid frame bridge
- MPS: Historic Bridges/Tunnels in Washington State TR
- NRHP reference No.: 82004247

Significant dates
- Added to NRHP: July 16, 1982
- Designated SEATL: December 28, 1981

Location
- Interactive map of Schmitz Park Bridge

The Schmitz Park Bridge is a 175 ft (53 m) concrete-box bridge that spans a ravine in Seattle's Schmitz Park. Built in 1936, the structure is both listed in the National Register of Historic Places and is a designated city landmark.

The bridge was designed by city engineer Clark Eldridge. It replaced a timber-truss span that had been erected in 1916. The funds were provided by the federal Public Works Administration and by local gas-tax and highway funds. The rigid frame created by the concrete box cells made the structure 60 percent longer than any such bridge previously constructed.

The graffiti artwork underneath the bridge has received praise in C-Monster's art blog and from a critic with the Seattle Post-Intelligencer.
