= Isaac Vossius =

Dutch classical scholar (1618–1689)

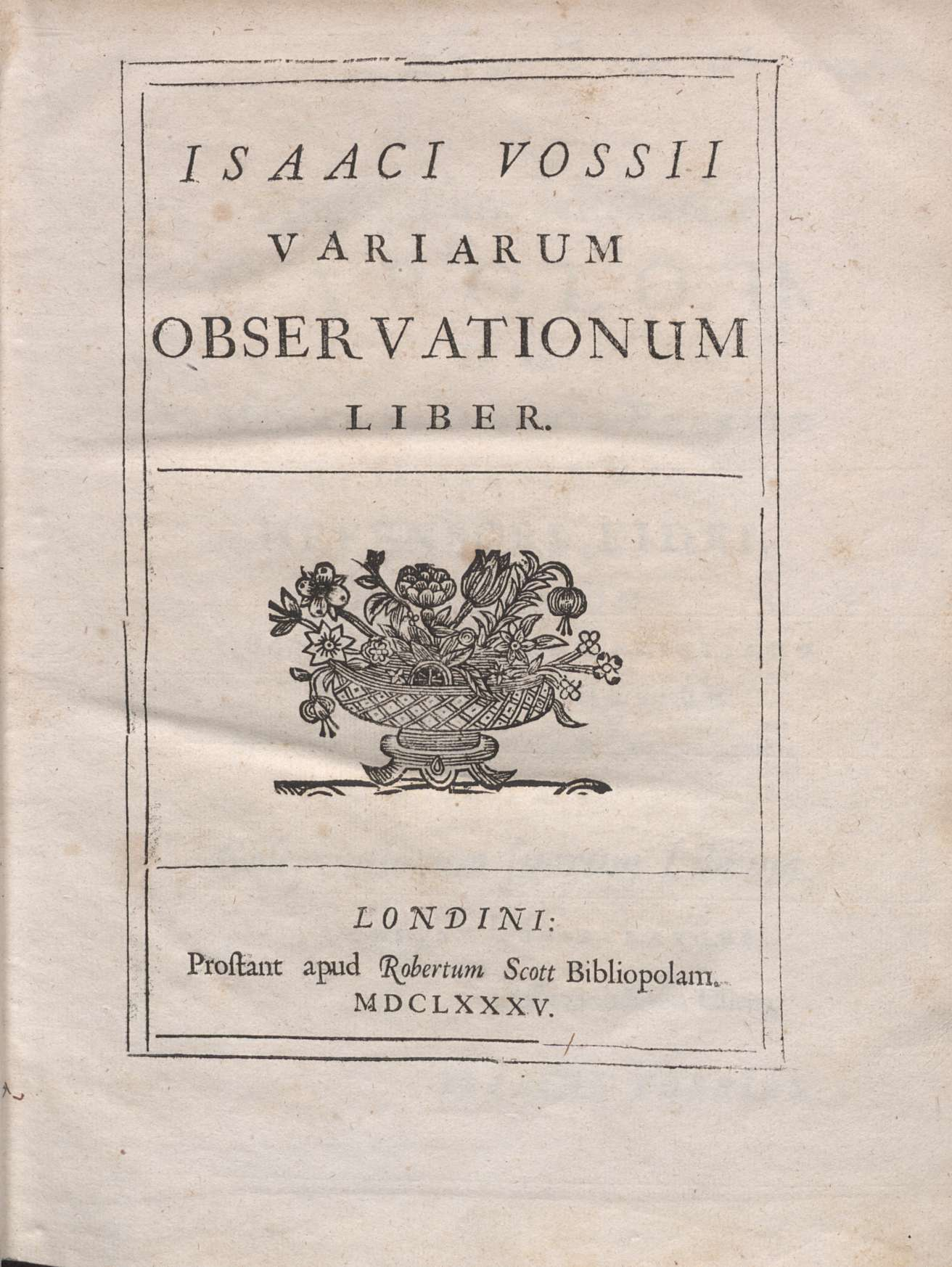
Variarum observationum liber, 1685

Isaak Vossius, sometimes anglicised Isaac Voss (1618 in Leiden – 21 February 1689 in Windsor, Berkshire) was a Dutch philologist scholar and manuscript collector.

== Life ==
Isaac Vossius was the son of the humanist Gerhard Johann Vossius. Isaak formed what was accounted the best private library in the world (Massil 2003). He had a contemporary reputation for eccentricity, refusing the sacrament on his deathbed, it was reported, until reminded that to do so would reflect unfavorably on the canons of St George's Chapel, Windsor Castle, to which chapter he belonged.

He was raised in the atmosphere of a scholarly household, familiar with Greek, ancient geography, and Arabic from an early age. In 1641, he undertook a European tour, in which he visited England, France and Italy (notably Florence), making the acquaintance of scholars of the elder generation such as James Ussher and Hugo Grotius and beginning his lifelong collecting of manuscripts and books before he returned to Amsterdam in 1644 to take up a position as city librarian.

In 1648, he went to Sweden, summoned by Queen Christina to take up a position as her court librarian, and was accompanied by Cornelius Tollius as his amanuensis. There he enriched the library that had been founded by Gustavus Adolphus, partly as booty of war from the library of Prague, with judicious purchases, but incurred the enmity of the French philologist Claudius Salmasius. At the death of his father in 1650, he returned briefly to Amsterdam to oversee the shipping of his father's library to Stockholm. He determined to leave Sweden in 1654, and after Christina abdicated upon her conversion to Catholicism, he followed her to Brussels, where he took his leave of her. The impecunious queen paid her former librarian's outstanding back pay in books, among which was the Codex Argenteus. In 1664 Vossius was elected a Fellow of the Royal Society in London.

After his brilliant, though at times controversial, career of scholarship in Sweden, Vossius went to England in 1670, received a degree in civil law from Oxford, and became residentiary canon at Windsor in 1673, a post he held until 1688, shortly before his death. In the later stage of his life, his interests turned to mathematics and natural history.

== Bibliotheca Vossiana ==
By the time of his death in 1689, Vossius' private library contained around 700 manuscripts and almost 4000 printed works. After his death, his heirs sold his library of books and manuscripts to the University of Leiden for 33,000 guilders. Today the 729 Codices Vossiani are catalogued under shelfmarks identifying his collection within the broader Western manuscript collection. The Codices Vossiani are classified according to language and format:

- VLF, VLQ, VLO – Latin folio, quarto and octo
- VGF, VGQ, VGO – Greek folio, quarto and octo
- VMI – miscellenae (mixed Latin and Greek)
- VGG F, VGG Q – Germano-Gallico (Germanic and Romance languages) folio and quarto
- VCF, VCQ, VCO – medical, pharmaceutical and alchemical manuscripts, folio, quarto and octo.

In 2025, 324 manuscripts of the Vossiani Latini collection were made available free online with a CC-BY license via the Leiden University Library Digital Collections website.

== Works ==
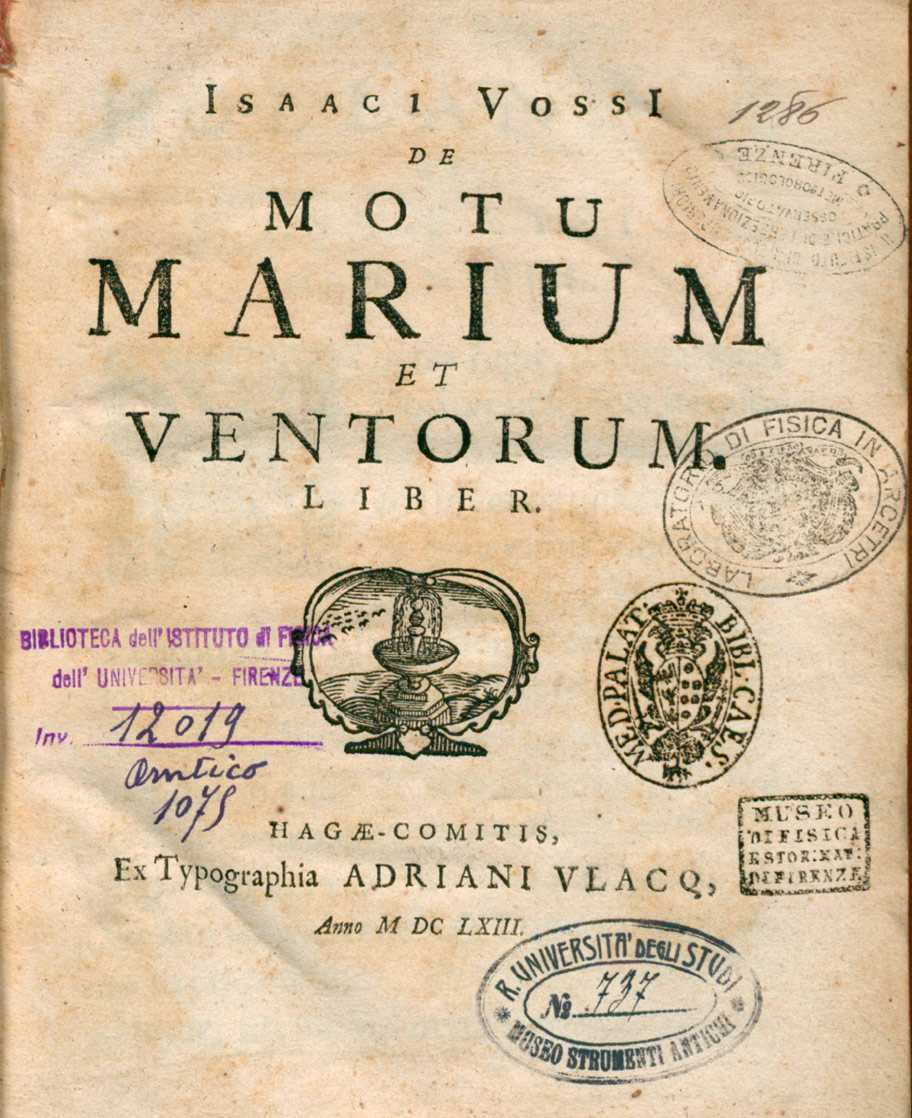
De motu marium et ventorum, 1663

He was the author of De septuaginta interpretibus (1661), De poematum cantu et viribus rhythmi (1673), and Variarum observationum liber (1685).

- De motu marium et ventorum (in Latin). Den Haag: Adriaen Vlacq. 1663.
- Variarum observationum liber (in Latin). London: Robert Scott. 1685.
- Observationum ad Pomponium Melam appendix (in Latin). London: Robert Scott. 1686.

== See also ==
- Coenraad van Beuningen
