= Joseph Schmitz =

Joseph Schmitz may refer to:

- Joseph A. Schmitz (1898–1994), member of the Wisconsin State Assembly
- Joseph E. Schmitz (born 1956), American attorney and government official
