= Herman Tollius =

Dutch philologist and historian

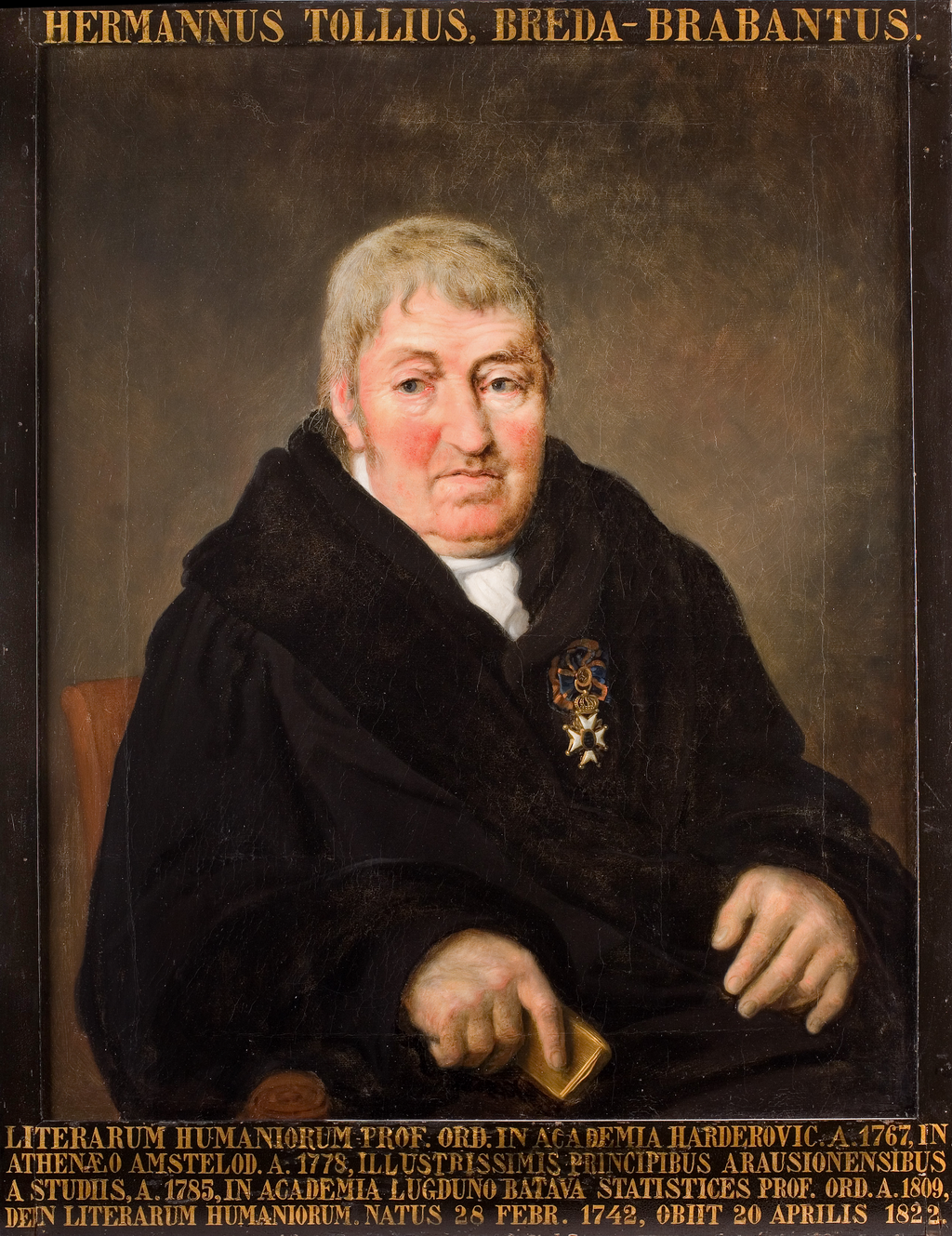
Herman Tollius (1742-1822)

Herman Tollius (28 February 1742, in Breda – 29 April 1822, in Leiden) was a Dutch philologist and historian.

He studied jurisprudence in Leiden, earning his doctorate of law in 1763. From 1767 he served as a professor of rhetoric and Greek at the University of Harderwijk. Beginning in 1784 he was a private tutor to the children of Stadtholder William V. In 1809 he was appointed professor of statistics and diplomacy at Leiden, where he later worked as a professor of Greek and Latin languages.

Among his written efforts was an edition of Apollonius Sophista titled "Apollonii Sophistae Lexicon graecum Iliadis et Odysseae" (1788), and a work on constitutional writings involving events taking place in the United Netherlands in 1786/87, — Staatkundige geschriften, betreffende eenige gewigtige gebeurtenissenin de Vereendigde Nederlanden, gedurende de jaren MDCCLXXXVI, MDCCLXXXVII, en vervolgens.

His daughter Bartha produced a handful of pastel portraits, including one of her father.
