= Nant de Drance Hydropower Plant =

Nant de Drance
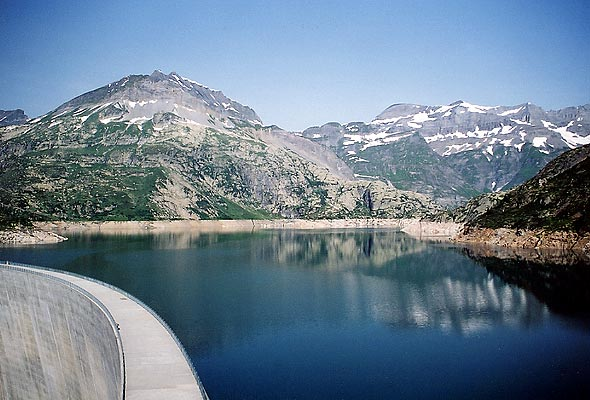
- Lac d'Emosson forms the lower reservoir
- Country: Switzerland
- Location: Finhaut, Saint-Maurice, Valais
- Coordinates: 46°03′49″N 06°54′36″E
- Status: Operational
- Construction began: September 2008
- Opening date: July 2022
- Construction cost: US$2.1 billion (CHF 1.9 billion, €1.5 billion)
- Owner(s): Nant de Drance SA

Upper reservoir
- Creates: Lac du Vieux Emosson
- Total capacity: 25,000,000 m^{3} (20,000 acre⋅ft)

Lower reservoir
- Creates: Lac d'Emosson
- Total capacity: 227,000,000 m^{3} (184,000 acre⋅ft)

Power Station
- Hydraulic head: 295 m (968 ft)
- Pump-generators: 6 x 150 MW reversible Francis-type
- Installed capacity: 900 MW
- Annual generation: 2,500 GWh (est.)
- 20 GWh energy storage

The Nant de Drance Hydropower Plant is a pumped-storage power station in the canton of Valais in Switzerland. It is within the municipality of Finhaut, district of Saint-Maurice and about 14 km (8.7 mi) southwest of Martigny. Construction on the power plant began in 2008 and it began operations in 2022. It is owned by Nant de Drance SA, a consortium of Alpiq (39%), SBB (36%), Industrielle Werke Basel (15%) and Forces Motrices Valaisannes (FMV) (10%). The US$1.9 billion plant has an installed capacity of 900 MW and an energy storage capacity of 20 GWh.

== Background ==
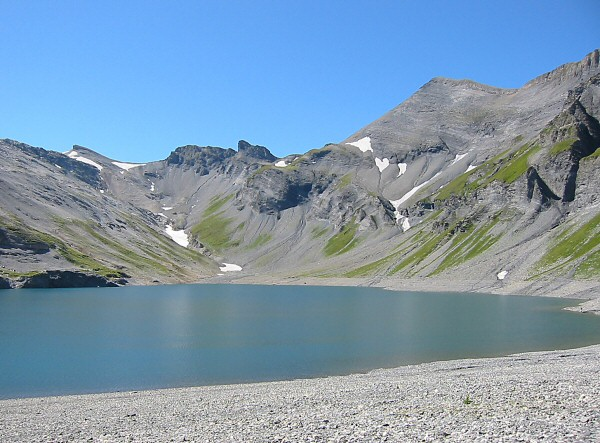
Lac du Vieux Emosson will be raised and form the upper reservoir

On 25 August 2008, the Swiss Federal Department of Environment, Transport, Energy and Communications granted a building permit to Nant de Drance SA for the construction of the plant with a 600 MW design. Preliminary construction began in September 2008 but a concession was granted in April 2011 which allowed for a larger 900 MW plant. Excavation of the tunnels began in 2009 and the caverns commenced in 2010. Raising of the upper Vieux Emosson Dam began in Spring 2013. The underground power house excavation was completed in April 2014. The first generators were tested in 2017.

In December 2014, at the International Tunnelling & Underground Space Awards, the project was awarded the Major Tunnelling Project of the Year award in the category of projects over US$500 million.

== Design ==
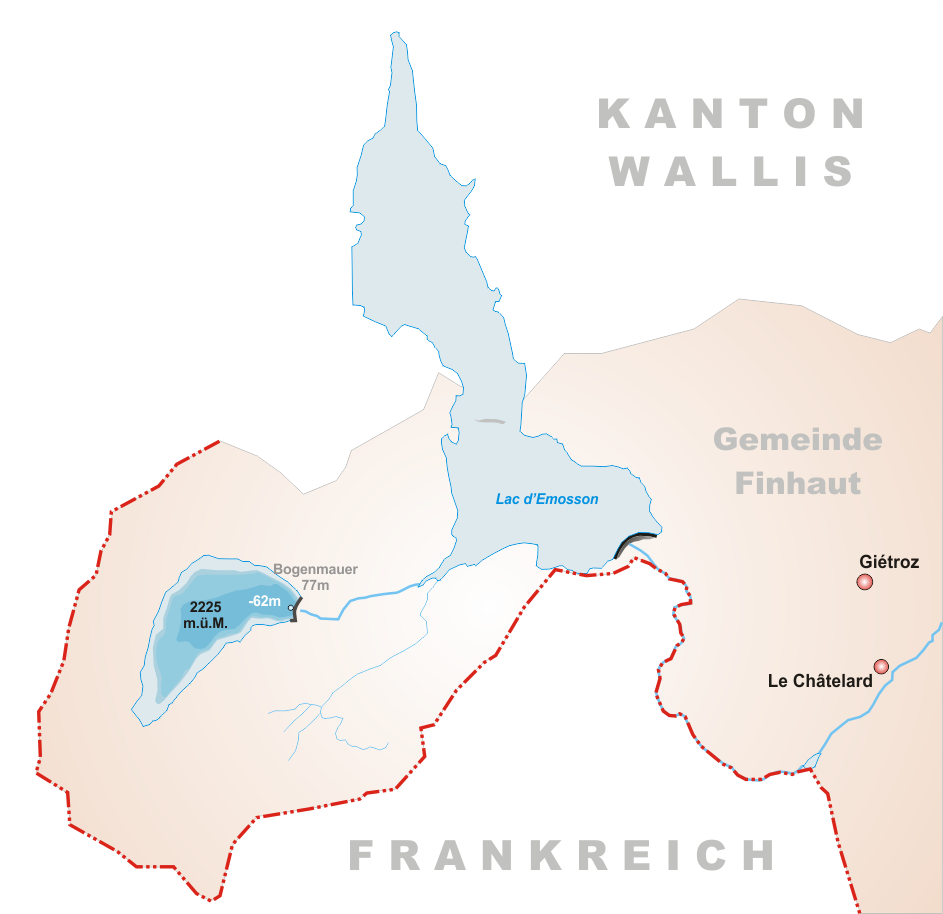
The plant will be located between the upper and lower reservoirs

The power plant uses two existing reservoirs to operate. The lower reservoir, Lac d'Emosson, is formed by the 180 m (590 ft) tall, 555 m (1,821 ft) long Émosson Dam, an arch dam which was completed in 1974. It withholds a reservoir with a storage capacity of 227,000,000 m^{3} (184,000 acre⋅ft) and surface area of 327 ha (810 acres). The lower reservoir is 4 km (2.5 mi) long and when full, lies 1,930 m (6,330 ft) above sea level.

The upper reservoir for the plant, Lac du Vieux Emosson, is formed by a 45 m (148 ft) tall and 170 m (560 ft) long arch dam originally completed in 1955. The dam is 65 m (213 ft) tall. Lac du Vieux Emosson's storage capacity is 25,000,000 m^{3} (20,000 acre⋅ft) and has a surface area of 55 ha (140 acres). When full, the upper reservoir lies 2,225 m (7,300 ft) above sea level.

The power plant is between both reservoirs and uses the pumped-storage hydroelectric method. To accomplish this, when energy demand is high, water is released from the upper reservoir, down a series of 425 m (1,394 ft) penstocks to the six 150 MW reversible Francis turbine-generators in the power plant. The large underground power house measures 194 m (636 ft) long, 52 m (171 ft) high and 32 m (105 ft) wide. After generating power, water from the power plant is discharged to the lower reservoir, releasing up to 20 GWh of energy. When power demand is low, such as at night, the turbines reverse and water can be pumped back up to the upper reservoir for use during high demand periods. As such, it serves as a peaking power plant with 80% efficiency.

Under the guidance of AF-Consult Switzerland Ltd as general planner, the civil engineering works were carried out by GMI (a joint venture of Marti and Implenia) and the electro-mechanical works were done by GE Hydro.
