= Herman Schmitz =

Herman Schmitz co-wrote the song Patrick mon chéri (1975), along with Peter Koelewijn and Will Hoebee. This song was performed by the duo of which he was part, Kiki and Pearly. The song was covered by French singer Sheila, who had a French number-one hit with it in 1976.

Herman started his music career as the guitar player of Tagrag.
