= Alpiq =

International active energy group

- Type: Public
- ISIN: CH0285509334
- Industry: Electric utility
- Founded: 2009; 17 years ago
- Headquarters: Lausanne, Switzerland
- Key people: Antje Kanngiesser (CEO); Alberto de Paoli (chairman)
- Products: Energy production, energy trading, renewable energy
- Revenue: ▼CHF 5.9 billion (2025)
- Number of employees: 1417 (2025)
- Website: www.alpiq.com

Alpiq is an internationally active energy group headquartered in Lausanne, Switzerland. The company was established in 2009 after the merger of Atel Holding AG (Aare-Tessin AG für Elektrizität) and EOS S.A. (Energie Ouest Suisse).

The energy group has around 1,400 employees, is active in most European countries and is considered too big to fail in Switzerland.

== History ==
The company was formed in February 2009 from the merger of Energie Ouest Suisse (EOS) and Aare-Tessin AG für Elektrizität (Atel).

In 2010, Alpiq became the largest open market electric power trader in Romania, surpassing Alro Slatina, and gaining a 16% market share.

From 2012 to 2016, the company's revenue fell by more than half and Alpiq incurred heavy losses in the area of hydropower. Acting as a wholesaler, the company was affected by a price drop in the wholesale market. Furthermore, unlike other renewable energies, hydropower was not supported by the state. Alpiq therefore announced its intention to sell 49% of the hydropower plants in March 2016, but no buyer was found.

Alpiq tried to sell its Swiss nuclear power plants to EDF in 2016, as the production costs of the nuclear power plants were higher than the electricity prices at the time.

In March 2018, Bouygues acquired Alpiq's energy services business for over CHF 800 million. Following disagreements over the final adjustment amount, arbitration proceedings ensued. This was terminated in 2020 and Alpiq refunded over CHF 50 million to Bouygues.

Until 2019, Alpiq owned two coal-fired power stations in the Czech Republic until they were transferred to investor Pavel Tykač's Seven Energy Group at the end of August 2019, as Alpiq increasingly focused investments on renewable energies. Through the sale of the coal-fired power station, the company reduced its CO_{2} emissions by 60%.

At a media conference in early April 2019, Alpiq announced that EDF was selling its Alpiq shares. The consortium agreement, which was to be terminated in September 2020, ended early. By the end of May 2019, EOS Holding and Primeo Energie each took over half of the share package, financed by a mandatory convertible loan from Credit Suisse. The aim was to delist Alpiq shares from the Six Swiss Exchange by means of a squeeze-out, and to split Alpiq's share capital. The delisting application was approved by Six Exchange Regulation on 26 November 2019 and the delisting was set for 17 December 2019. On the last day on the stock exchange, the share price was approximately CHF 70.

Since the mid-2020s, Alpiq has expanded into battery energy storage systems. In October 2025, the company commissioned its first wholly owned battery storage facility in Finland. It acquired another facility in France in early 2026 and a 90% stake in the British battery storage developer and operator Harmony Energy in July 2026.

== Company structure ==
Alpiq is a public limited company under the Swiss Code of Obligations, with its registered office in Lausanne. As the operator of several power plants, it is active in the fields of energy generation and energy trading. As of 31 December 2025, the three shareholder groups EOS Holding SA, Schweizer Kraftwerksbeteiligungs-AG and the consortium of Swiss minority shareholders each held one third of Alpiq shares.

Since 1 January 2026, Alpiq has had three business divisions: Assets, Trading and Energy Solutions. Assets operates power plants and storage facilities used to generate electricity. Trading handles electricity trading in Europe and the optimisation of Alpiq's power plants. Energy Solutions provides products and services for customers, including the direct marketing of renewable electricity and power purchase agreements.

Alpiq is managed by the Board of Directors and the Executive Board. The Board of Directors is responsible for the overall management and strategic direction of the Alpiq Group as well as for supervising the Executive Board. As of October 2026, its members were Alberto de Paoli (Chairman), François Gabella (Deputy Chairman), Adrian Honegger, Christian Plüss, Adèle Thorens Goumaz, Jørgen Kildahl and Ronald Trächsel. As of November 2026, the Executive Board consisted of Antje Kanngiesser (CEO), Peter-Wim Gerssen (CFO), Amédée Murisier (Head of Assets), Bianca Sarbu (Head of Energy Solutions) and Morgane Trieu Cuot (interim Head of Trading).

In the 2025 financial year, Alpiq generated revenue of around CHF 5.9 billion and employed 1,417 people.

=== Sites ===
Alpiq is active in various countries in Europe. In addition to its headquarters in Switzerland, the company operates further power plants at several locations in Italy, Spain, France, and Hungary. The various nuclear and hydroelectric power plants are located in Switzerland, while the power plants for new renewable energies are located in Switzerland, Italy, France and Sweden. Other subsidiaries are located in the Czech Republic, Germany and the Nordic countries.

== Activities ==
Alpiq is an independent electricity producer and energy trader. The company is active in the business fields of energy generation, trading, and services. Its customers include medium-sized companies, large enterprises and public institutions.

Alpiq uses hydropower, nuclear power, gas-fired and combined cycle power plants and new renewable energy sources such as small hydro, wind, and solar power plants to generate electricity. In 2025, Alpiq produced 14,860 gigawatt-hours (GWh) of electricity, which broke down as follows:

- 7001 GWh hydropower (47%)
- 4546 GWh nuclear power (31%)
- 2990 GWh conventional thermal power plants (20%)
- 323 GWh wind and photovoltaic power (2%).

=== Nuclear power plants ===
The company has interests in two nuclear power plants. Alpiq holds a 40% interest in the Swiss Gösgen Nuclear Power Plant (capacity, 1060 MW) and is in charge of management. It holds a 27.4% stake in the Swiss Leibstadt Nuclear Power Plant (capacity, 1165 MW). In 2016, Alpiq attempted to sell the nuclear power plants.

=== Hydropower plants ===
Reservoir and pumped-storage plants can respond to changes in demand and help stabilise power grids by supplying electricity when solar and wind generation is low.

Alpiq is involved in a number of hydropower expansion projects. Grande Dixence SA, in which Alpiq holds a 60% interest, is planning the Gornerli multipurpose reservoir above Zermatt, with a storage volume of around 120 million cubic metres. At the Moiry and Emosson reservoirs, the dams are planned to be raised by 9 and 10 metres respectively, which is intended to increase storage capacity by a total of more than 165 gigawatt-hours. In February 2026, Alpiq acquired the Navaleo pumped-storage project in Castile and León, Spain, with a planned capacity of 535 megawatts.

==== Storage power plants ====
The most important hydropower plants for Switzerland are the Grande Dixence Dam with a capacity of over 2000 megawatts, and the Nant de Drance Hydropower Plant with a capacity of 900 megawatts. With its capacity of 900 megawatts, the Nant de Drance is one of the most powerful pumped storage plants in Switzerland.

Alpiq Holding operates the following storage power plants:

Storage power plants
Name	Country	Capacity MW	Annual production (million kWh)	Stake (%)
Blenio	Switzerland	400	835	17%
Cleuson-Dixence (Note: Cleuson-Dixence and Grande Dixence have a combined capacity of 2069 MW and a combined annual production of 2 TWh)	Switzerland	2069	2000	72,7%
Emosson	Switzerland	420	850	50%
Gougra	Switzerland	168	643	54%
Engadiner	Switzerland	410	1418	22%
Grande Dixence	Switzerland	2069	2000	60%
Hinterrhein	Switzerland	744	1368	9,3%
Forces Motrices Hongrin-Léman S.A. (FMHL)	Switzerland	480	1000	39,3%
Maggia	Switzerland	626	1265	12,5%
Electra-Massa	Switzerland	340	564	34,5%
Nant de Drance	Switzerland	900		39%
Salanfe S.A.	Switzerland	70	110	100%
Simplon	Switzerland	80	258	82%
Zervreila	Switzerland	266	550	21,6%

==== Run-of-river power plants ====
Alpiq also owns and operates various run-of-river power plants on the Aare in the cantons of Solothurn, Valais, Bern and Aargau. The run-of-river power plant near Flumenthal has a capacity of 27 megawatts and generates 146 million kilowatt hours of electricity per year. The Gösgen run-of-river power plant near Niedergösgen is one of the largest run-of-river power plants on the Aare, with an annual production of around 300 million kilowatt hours and an output of 51.3 megawatts. On 23 September 2020, the power plant received a new 70-year concession with retroactive effect from 1 January 2020. With an output of 23 megawatts, the Ruppoldingen run-of-river power plant generates 115 million kilowatt hours per year and is certified with the Swiss green electricity label naturemade star.

Alpiq operates the following run-of-river power plants:

Run-of-river power plants
Name	Country	Capacity MW	Annual production (million kWh)	Stake (%)
Ruppoldingen	Switzerland	23	115	100%
Flumenthal	Switzerland	27	146	62,1%
Gösgen	Switzerland	51.3	300	100%
Ryburg-Schwörstadt	Switzerland	120	705	13,5%
Martigny-Bourg	Switzerland	22	89	18%

=== Gas-fired and combined cycle power plants ===
Alpiq has stakes of up to 100% in gas-fired and combined cycle power plants in Italy, Spain, and Hungary:

Gas-fired and combined cycle power plants
Name	Country	Capacity MW	Annual production (million kWh)	Stake (%)
Csepel	Hungary	403	500	100%
Novel	Italy	100	602	51%
Plana del Vent	Spain	846	662	50%
San Severo	Italy	403	1421	100%
Vercelli	Italy	50		100%

=== New renewable energies ===
In addition to hydroelectric power plants, Alpiq also generates electricity through wind power, small hydroelectric power plants and solar energy. The following table provides an overview of the small hydroelectric power plants in which Alpiq has a stake or owns:

Small-scale hydropower plants
Name	Country	Capacity MW	Annual production (million kWh)	Stake (%)
Alagna Valsesia	Italy	4.6	9	90%
Bätterkinden	Switzerland	0.37	2.47	65%
Brüggmühle and Sittermühle	Switzerland	0.283	1.22	100%
Buchholz	Switzerland	0.14	0.53	23%
Cotlan	Switzerland	2.6	12.5	60%
Büttenen 1&2	Switzerland	0.895	5.43	100%
Eisenhammer	Switzerland	0.24	0.84	100%
Freienstein	Switzerland	0.61	2.27	18%
Grüneta	Switzerland	0.198	1.41	100%
Hagerhüsli	Switzerland	0.5	2.85	65%
Hämmerli	Switzerland	0.1	0.5	23%
Hüscherabach	Switzerland	1.9	6.1	60%
Lavinuoz	Switzerland	2.9	10.8	25%
Le Bayet	France	2.5	6.2	100%
Model	Switzerland	0.418	2.51	49%
Moos	Switzerland	0.88	5.74	100%
Matzingen	Switzerland	0.105	0.64	100%
Meyerhans	Switzerland	0.42	2.45	49%
Murkart	Switzerland	0.325	1.48	100%
Nenzlingen	Switzerland	0.34	1.43	100%
Peist	Switzerland	0.295	1.2	51%
Riein	Switzerland	0.015	0.07	100%
Riva Valdobbia	Italy	1.0	8.5	90%
Seon	Switzerland	0.072	0.41	75%
Striempel	Switzerland	0.014	0.046	100%
Tambobach	Switzerland	1.835	7.85	70%
Tomils	Switzerland	0.038	0.129	100%
Trans	Switzerland	0.022	0.09	100%
Walzmühle	Switzerland	0.062	0.37	100%
Widen	Switzerland	0.77	4.4	49%

==== Solar power plants ====
In 2022, Alpiq, together with the municipality of Gondo-Zwischbergen and Energie Electrique du Simplon, launched the Gondosolar project to install solar modules in Alpjerung near the municipality of Gondo. Alpiq is also involved in other projects for the installation of high-alpine photovoltaic systems, such as the Prafleuri and Grimentz Solaire projects. Alpiq operates several solar power plants in Switzerland, France, and Italy: In July 2024, Alpiq sold its seven rooftop photovoltaic installations in Switzerland to PS Panneaux Solaires SA.

Solar power plants
Name	Country	Capacity MW	Annual production (million kWh)	Stake (%)
Ruppoldingen	Switzerland	0.111	0.1	100%
Società Agricola Solar Farm 2	Italy	5.190	7	100%
Società Agricola Solar Farm 4	Italy	8.408	13.5	100%

==== Wind power plants ====
Alpiq operates wind farms in Italy, France, Sweden and Switzerland. In December 2020, Alpiq and the Swiss company Future Generation Renewable Energy (Fu-Gen) concluded a co-ownership agreement for the Tormoseröd wind farm developed by Alpiq in south-west Sweden. The wind farm has been operational since 2023 and Alpiq holds a 30% stake.

Wind power plants
Name	Country	Capacity MW	Annual production (million kWh)	Stake (%)
Roca Rossa	Italy	84	127	100%
Cers	France	11.5	36	15%
Cattolica Eraclea	Italy	40	56	100%
Roussas-Gravières	France	10.5	21	100%
Le Peuchapatte	Switzerland	6.9	13.5	100%
Ennese	Italy	70.5	111	100%
Monte Mele	Italy	9	12	100%
Tormoseröd	Sweden	72.6	220	30%

=== Battery storage ===
Alpiq operates battery energy storage systems (BESS). In October 2025, it commissioned its first wholly owned battery storage system in Valkeakoski, Finland. The facility has a power output of 30 megawatts and a capacity of 36 megawatt-hours. It is used for grid services as well as short-term and intraday trading.

In January 2026, Alpiq acquired the Cheviré battery storage facility at the port of Nantes Saint-Nazaire in France from Harmony Energy. The facility, which was inaugurated in December 2025, has a power output of 100 megawatts and a capacity of 200 megawatt-hours. At the time of the acquisition, it was the largest operational battery storage facility in France. In early July 2026, Alpiq acquired a 90% stake in Harmony Energy, a battery storage developer and operator founded in 2010 and based in the United Kingdom.

Battery storage facilities
Name	Location	Power output MW	Capacity MWh	Stake (%)
BESS Valkeakoski	Valkeakoski, Finland	30	36	100%
BESS Cheviré	Nantes Saint-Nazaire, France	100	200	100%

=== Hydrogen ===
In April 2024, Alpiq acquired a majority stake in the Finnish hydrogen company P2X Solutions, which is based in Espoo. P2X Solutions built Finland's first industrial-scale green hydrogen production facility in Harjavalta. The facility, which has an electrolysis capacity of 20 megawatts, entered service in February 2025.

In Switzerland, Alpiq holds an interest in Hydrospider AG together with H2 Energy and Linde. Since 2020, Hydrospider has worked with partner companies on the production, logistics and distribution of green hydrogen. Its two-megawatt electrolysis facility at Alpiq's run-of-river power plant in Niedergösgen can produce up to 300 tonnes of green hydrogen per year.

== Environment and sustainability ==
In 2018, Alpiq generated an average of 298 grams of CO_{2} equivalents and 19 cubic millimeters of nuclear waste per kilowatt-hour. Alpiq was the worst performer among the largest energy companies, with an average of 347 environmental impact points (EIP). The sale of the last two coal-fired power plants in the Czech Republic in the same year reduced Alpiq's CO_{2} emissions scrap by 60%.

During the construction of the Nant de Drance pumped storage power plant, a total of CHF 22 million were invested in ecological compensation measures, in cooperation with WWF and Pro Natura. The measures included, above all, the restoration of wetland biotopes to enable the recolonization of endangered or rare animal and plant species.

Alpiq is also committed to environmental protection at the company's own power plants. In rivers downstream of hydroelectric power plants, there is often a lack of bed load, which is considered the habitat of many aquatic creatures. To counteract the bed load deficit in the Aare downstream of the Ruppoldingen hydroelectric power plant and protect the habitat, Alpiq poured a total of 6,000 cubic meters of gravel into the river in 2021. The Ruppoldingen hydroelectric power plant is also naturemade star certified, the highest award for green electricity in Switzerland. For every kilowatt-hour sold from the power plant with proof of origin, money is paid into the Alpiq eco-fund. These funds are then used to support ecological upgrading and improvement measures. More than CHF 5 million have been invested in such measures, including revitalization measures on the Witibach in Grenchen and ecological upgrading on the Aare.
