= Pietro Alcionio =

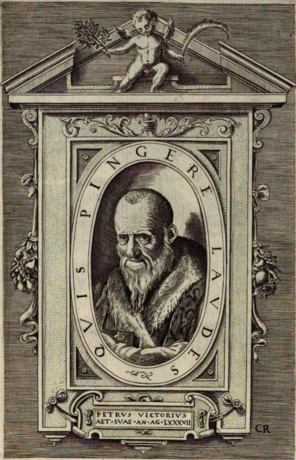
- Pietro Alcionio, gravura em De generatione et corruptione, 1521
- Born: 1487; Venice
- Died: 1527 (aged 39–40); Rome
- Occupation: Renaissance humanist, teacher, classical philologist

Pietro Alcionio (or Petrus Alcyonius) (c. 1487 – 1527) was a Venetian humanist and classical scholar under the patronage of Pope Clement VII. He is known as a translator of Aristotle. He was wounded during the Sack of Rome in May 1527, and died later that year.

His origins are unknown; his eloquence was praised in Erasmus' letter to John Watson in 1516, the earliest surviving notice. After having studied Greek in Venice under Marcus Musurus of Candia, he was employed for some time as a proofreader by the printer Aldus Manutius. Alcionio published at Venice, in 1521, a Latin translation of several of the works of Aristotle (dedicating the volume to Leo X). The Spanish scholar Sepúlveda, when shown the work, found it to contain many mistakes.

In 1522 Alcionio was appointed professor of Greek at Florence through the influence of Giulio de' Medici. That year he entrusted to the Aldine publish a dialogue in the nature of a eulogy on the theme of exile (Medices legatus, sive de exsilio), in a Ciceronian Latin so finely honed that he was charged with plagiarism by his personal enemy, Paulus Manutius. The accusation was that he had taken the finest passages in the work from Cicero's lost treatise De Gloria and had then destroyed the only existing copy of the original to escape detection. The 18th century scholar Abate Girolamo Tiraboschi in his Storia della letterature italiana demonstrated this to be groundless, but the smear has dogged the reputation of Alciono.

When his patron became pope the following year under the title of Clement VII, Alcionio followed him to Rome and remained there until his death. Encyclopædia Britannica (1911) remarked that "His contemporaries speak very unfavourably of Alcionio, and accuse him of haughtiness, uncouth manners, vanity and licentiousness."

Alcionio is one of the four humanists in the circle of Clement VII selected by Kenneth Gouwens to illustrate the shock of cultural discontinuity and new sense of human vulnerability caused by the Sack of Rome that put a premature end to the High Renaissance. Of Alcionio's numerous translations of Greek classics into Latin, which included the orations of Isocrates and Demosthenes mentioned by Ambrogio Leoni, only his Aristotle has survived (Simon Finch).
