= Schmitz Park Creek =

Coordinates: 47°34′26.1″N 122°24′1.4″W

Location
- Country: United States
- State: Washington
- City: Seattle

Schmitz Park Creek is a stream in the West Seattle neighborhood of Seattle, Washington, United States. It is located entirely within Schmitz Park. A local citizens' group, Schmitz Park Creek Restore Project, was formed in an effort to daylight the stream, which had been covered by grates and other structures in the 19th and 20th centuries.
