= Schmitz Park =

Park in Seattle, Washington, United States

- Interactive map of Schmitz Park
- Type: Public
- Location: Seattle, Washington
- Coordinates: 47°34′26.7″N 122°24′00.9″W
- Area: 53.1-acre (21.5 ha)
- Established: 1908; 118 years ago
- Operator: Seattle Parks and Recreation

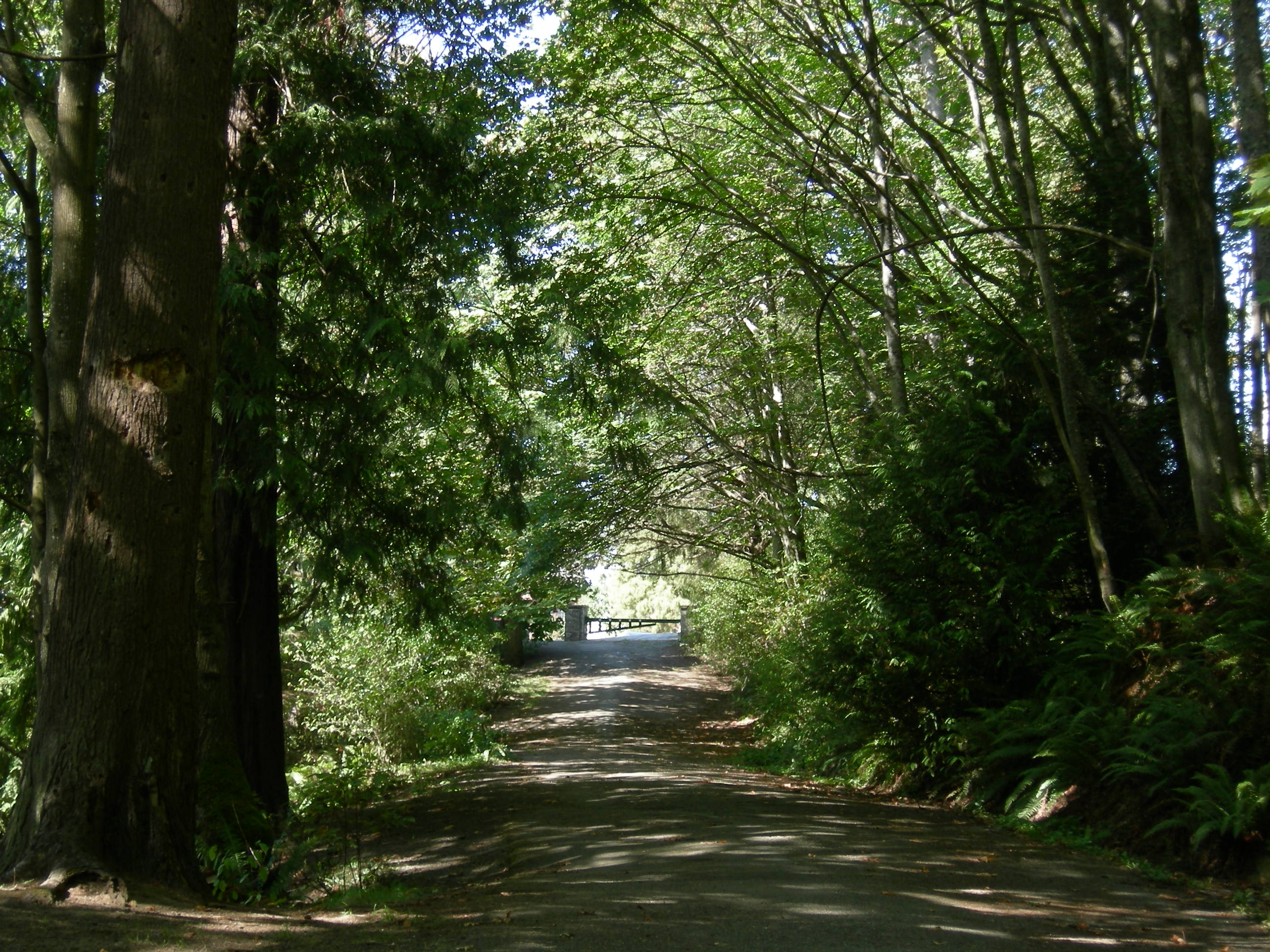
One of the very few roads in any part of Schmitz Park, looking out toward the Admiral Way entrance.

Schmitz Park, also known as Schmitz Preserve Park, is a 53.1-acre (21.5 ha) park around 15 blocks east of Alki Point in West Seattle, Washington. It features Schmitz Park Creek and one of the last stands of old-growth forest in the city.

The Lushootseed name for the area that is now the park is dəxʷqutəb, meaning "place of disease."

Ferdinand and Emma Schmitz donated 30 acres (12 ha) of the park to the city in 1908. They wanted their land to be used as a park. (Ferdinand was a German immigrant who moved to Seattle in 1887 and was the city's Parks Commissioner from 1908 to 1914). Additions to the park were purchased in 1909, 1930, 1947, and 1958, making the park grow over 20 more acres (8 ha).

In 1949, a "preservation policy" was applied to Schmitz Park. It stated that only foot trails were allowed and all signs were to be removed from inside the park's borders. This policy still remains today.

In 1953, Schmitz Park Elementary School opened to the public. The school sits adjacent to Schmitz Park.

In January 2018 Seattle City Council Bill No. CB 119169 authorized the purchase of a 5,000-sq. ft. lot at the southeast edge of the park from Bruce Stotler for $225,000, less than half its assessed value. Stotler will continue to live in his home there until he dies or chooses to move.

== See also ==
- Schmitz Park Bridge
