= Johannes Andreas Schmitz =

Dutch physician (1621–1652)

Johannes Andreas Schmitz (1621, Soest, Nordrhein-Westfalen – 2 October 1652, Harderwijk) was a German physician and the third rector of the University of Harderwijk.

== Life ==
Schmitz studied medicine in Groningen (1639), Leiden (1643), and Angers. He served as personal physician to Frederick William I, Elector of Brandenburg, and as city physician in Harderwijk (Reip. Harderv. Medicus ordinarius). He became Professor of Medicine (1648) and rector (1650) of the University of Harderwijk. He married Gertrud Kumpsthoff and had a son Johann Dietrich Schmitz (1648/1649-1692), who became mayor of Cleves, and a daughter Sophia (c. 1644-1671).

== Works ==
Schmitz is known for his posthumous work Medicinae practicae compendium (Harderwijk 1653, Copenhagen 1659, Paris 1666, Utrecht 1682, Leiden 1688). Georgius Hornius' preface to this work mentions the deceased author's never-realized plan to publish a botanical work, Plantarum Velavicarum Historia.
