= Bartha Hermina Tollius =

Dutch artist (1780–1847)

Bartha Hermina Tollius (May 5, 1780 – December 14, 1847) was an amateur Dutch pastellist.

Born in Amsterdam, Tollius was the daughter of Herman Tollius and his second wife, Johanna Christina Schoorn. The family fled the Netherlands with the events of 1795 and settled in Germany. It is likely that the three known surviving pastels by Bartha, a self-portrait and portraits of her parents, were made during this time; it has been posited that they were created in Braunschweig. Bartha Tollius married Roelof Gabriel Bennet (1774–1829), a naval officer and cartographer, and later published a Dagboek van onze uitlandigheid telling the story of her family's exile. She died in Amsterdam.
