= John Schmitz =

John Schmitz may refer to:

- John G. Schmitz (1930–2001), American congressman
- John P. Schmitz (born 1955), American government official and son of John G. Schmitz
- John Michael Schmitz (born 1999), American football player
- Johnny Schmitz (1920–2011), American baseball pitcher
