= Georgius Hornius =

Georgius Hornius (born Georg Horn; 1620–1670) was a German historian and geographer, and professor of history at Leiden University from 1653 until his death.

== Life ==
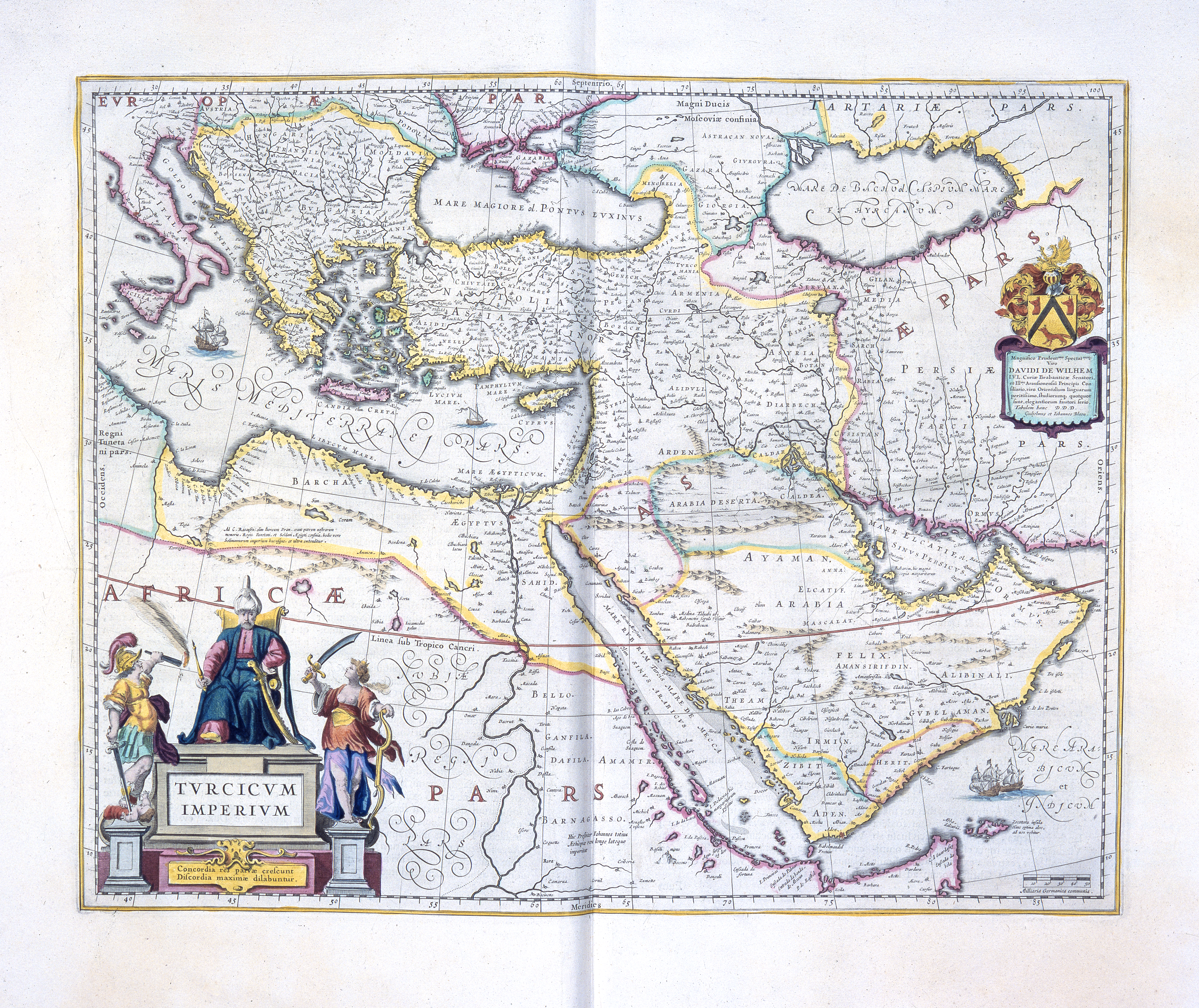
Map from 1654.

He was born in Kemnath, Upper Palatinate (at the time part of the Electoral Palatinate under Frederick V) as the son of the superintendent of the Reformed church there. His family was forced to move away in the wake of the Catholic victory at White Mountain when Horn was still an infant. In 1635, he visited the gymnasium in Nuremberg, and in 1637 he was enrolled in University of Altdorf as a student of theology and medicine. He later worked as a private tutor, in Gröningen and later in Leiden, in the Dutch Republic. In Leiden, he was also enrolled as a student of Friedrich Spanheim. After a two years' sojourn in England, he returned to Leiden, compiling a history of the events of the ongoing English Civil War (Rerum Britannicarum libri VII, De statu ecclesiae Britannicae hodierno).

In 1648, he completed a doctorate in Leiden and refused calls to both Frankfurt University and Heidelberg University as professor of theology, instead accepting the position of professor of history, politics and geography at the new University of Harderwijk, where he became rector in 1652. In 1653, he became professor of history at Leiden University, a position he held until his death on 10 November 1670 in Leiden.

In his later life, Horn was also greatly interested in alchemy. In 1665, he was swindled out of the considerable sum of 5,000 guilders by a fraudulent alchemist. His interest in alchemy als resulted in an edition of Pseudo-Geber in 1668. From about this time, he also began to suffer from intermittent spells of mental distraction, although he remained a prolific writer until his death.

Among his publications, his Latin works on universal history, intended as a textbook for students, were especially influential (Historia ecclesiastica et politica, Arca Noae, Orbis Politicus, Orbis Imperans). These works were re-published long after his death in both the Netherlands and Germany. He treated universal history in a modern manner, no longer divided into the history of the four classical empires (Assyria, Persia, Macedon, Rome) but based on the concept of national history, including the history of the peoples of the New World (De originibus Americanis). He was also one of the earliest historiographers to divide world history into three major epochs, antiquity from earliest times until the Migration period, the middle period from the Migration period to the year 1500, and modern history from 1500 to his own day. His coverage of the Migration period is presented as the history of the "Scythian" nation, which is divided into Germans, Huns and Slavs.

In all his works, Horn presents himself as a pious Protestant and as a patriot of his homeland, considering himself a native of and exile from the Upper Palatinate (which had been annexed by the Catholic Duke of Bavaria in 1628).

== Works ==
- De statu ecclesiae Britannicae hodierno commentarius. 1647
- Rerum Britannicarum libri septem, quibus res in Anglia, Scotia, Hibernia, ab anno MDCXLV bello gestae, eponuntur 1648
- De originibus Americanis libri IV. 1652
- Historia philosophica libri septem: quibus de origine, successione, sectis & vita philosophorum ab orbe condito ad nostram aetatem agitur. Elzevir, 1655
- Dissertationes historicae et politicae. Franciscus Hackius, 1655.
- Arca Noae, sive historia imperiorum et regnorum ̀condito orbe ad nostra tempora. Officina Hackiana, Leiden 1666 (archive.org)
- Arca Mosis, sive historia mundi. 1668
- Georgi Horni orbis politicus, imperiorum, regnorum, principatuum rerumpublicarum. 1668
- Gebri Arabis Chimia sive traditio summae perfectionis et investigatio magisterii innumeris locis emendata a Caspare Hornio [...] Medulla Alchimiae Gebricae omnia edita a Georgio Hornio. 1668 (google books).

posthumous editions:

- Historia naturalis et civilis. 1670, 1671, 1679
- Ulysses peregrinans, omnia lustrans littora. 1671, 1672
- Historia ecclesiastica. ed. Melchior Leydekker, 1687

translations:

- Aardbeschryving. 1681
- Kerkelycke historie, van de scheppinge des werelts, tot 't jaer des Heeren 1666. 1685 (archive.org).
- Description exacte de l'Univers : ou l'ancienne Geographie sacrée et profane. Pierre de Hondt, Haag 1741 (Digitized).
