= Rolf Martin Schmitz =

German businessman

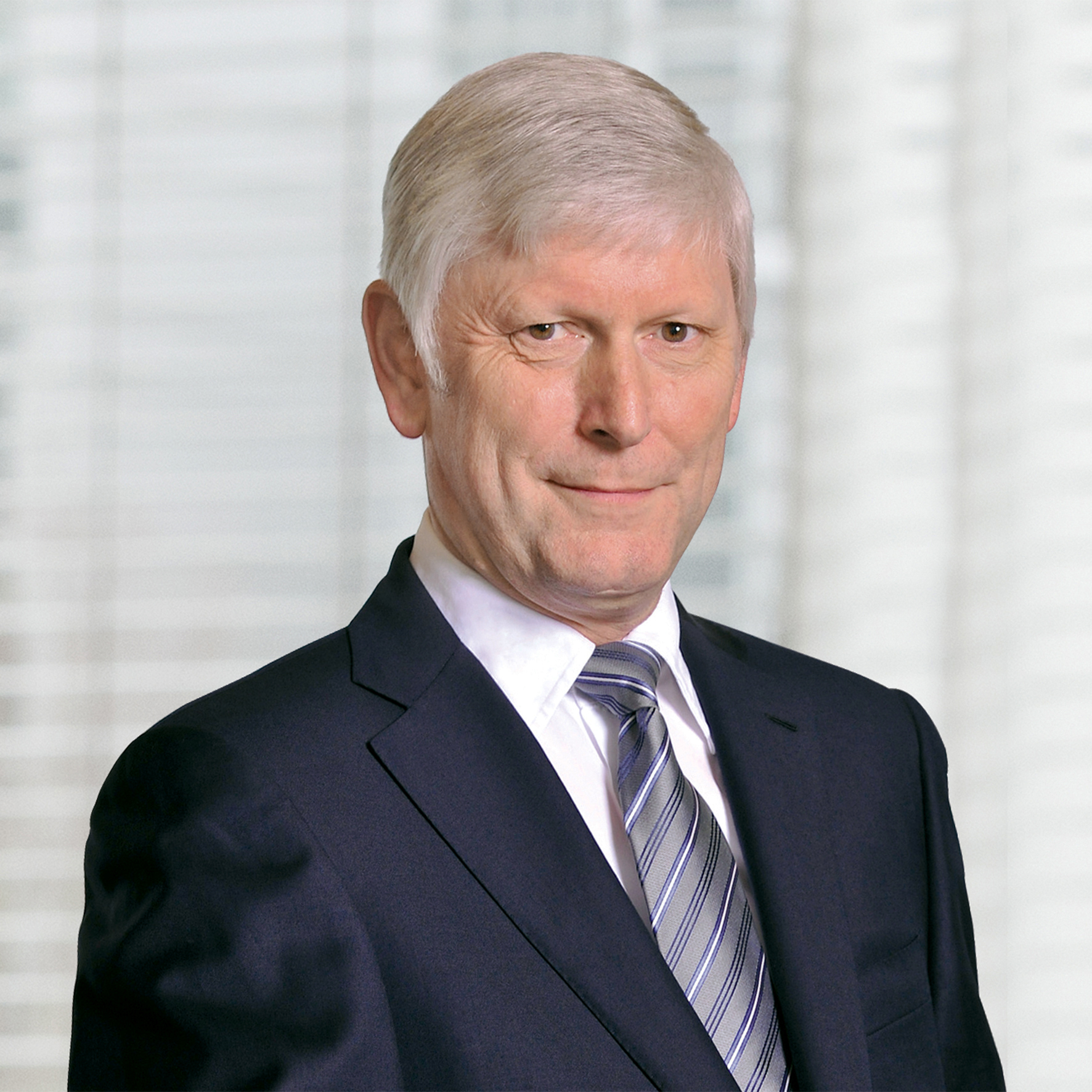
- Born: 17 June 1957 (age 69); Mönchengladbach, West Germany
- Education: RWTH Aachen University
- Occupations: ex-CEO, RWE

Rolf Martin Schmitz (born 17 June 1957) is a German manager and the former chief executive officer (CEO) at the German utilities company RWE AG.

== Education ==
Schmitz studied engineering from 1976 to 1981 at the RWTH Aachen and received his doctorate in 1985.

== Career ==
Schmitz started his career as planning and project engineer at STEAG in Essen, Germany, in 1986. He served in the machine technology department until 1988. He then served at the VEBA AG in Düsseldorf, where he finally worked as deputy head of economic policy. He stayed with VEBA until 1998. In 1998 Schmitz was appointed as member of the executive board at RheinEnergie AG in Cologne. In 2001 he became a member of the management board at Thüga AG, Munich, where he served before becoming chairman of the board at E.ON Kraftwerke GmbH in Hannover in 2004.

Rolf Martin Schmitz has been the CEO of RWE AG since October 2016. He was succeeded by Dr. Markus Krebber on 1 May 2021.

== Positions ==
According to Schmitz, the continued usage of existing coal plants and of new gas plants over the coming decades should remain a vital part of the energy mix for Germany. Schmitz stated that the energy transformation into renewables relies on energy suppliers to provide security of supply and large-scale solutions for power-storage. He has described RWE as a "cornerstone" and a "security partner" for the turnaround and the future of Germany's energy market.

Schmitz requested from Germany's government to provide a stable political framework for the energy market of the coming decades in order to allow suppliers to set up business plans accordingly. He rejected additional national CO_{2} emissions trading conditions or an additional minimum price, exceeding the agreements which have been reached on the EU level.

== Other ventures ==
=== Corporate boards ===
- Amprion, member of the supervisory board
- Kelag, member of the supervisory board
- TÜV Rheinland, member of the supervisory board

=== Non-profit organizations ===
- German Association of Energy and Water Industries (BDEW), president
- Klavier-Festival Ruhr, chairman of the board of trustees
