= List of Swiss Federal Acts =

Other federal laws are excluded from this list, such as the Federal constitution, the Civil Code, the Criminal Code, the Criminal Procedure Code, Federal ordinances and Federal decrees.

== Current legislation ==
Name	Decision	In force	Description	Category (SR)	German	French	Italian
SR 121 – Intelligence Service Act (IntelSA)	2015	2017	Defines the powers and scope of the Federal Intelligence Service (FIS), Switzerland's intelligence agency	12 Security of the Confederation	Nachrichtendienstgesetz, NDG	Loi fédérale sur le renseignement, LRens	Legge federale sulle attività informative, LAIn
SR 141.0 – Swiss Citizenship Act (SCA)	2014	2018	Governs the acquisition of Swiss citizenship	14 Citizenship, residence, permanent residence	Bürgerrechtsgesetz, BüG	Loi sur la nationalité suisse, LN	Legge sulla cittadinanza, LCit
SR 120 – Federal Act establishing measures for the maintenance of internal security	1997	1998	Governs the use of preventive police measures to maintain internal security (including terrorism, violent extremism, organized crime)	12 Security of the Confederation	Bundesgesetz über Massnahmen zur Wahrung der inneren Sicherheit, BWIS	Loi fédérale instituant des mesures visant au maintien de la sûreté intérieure, LMSI	Legge federale sulle misure per la salvaguardia della sicurezza interna, LMSI
SR 128 – Information Security Act	2020	2022	Governs the processing of information by federal authorities, establishes the National Cyber Security Centre (NCSC), mandates reporting of cyberattacks on critical infrastructure	12 Security of the Confederation	Informationssicherheitsgesetz, ISG	Loi sur la sécurité de l’information, LSI	Legge sulla sicurezza delle informazioni, LSIn
SR 138.1 – Federal law on the participation of the cantons in the foreign policy of the Confederation	1999	2000	Clarifies the role of cantons within Switzerland's foreign policy decisions	13 Confederation and Cantons	Bundesgesetz über die Mitwirkung der Kantone an der Aussenpolitik des Bundes, BGMK	Loi fédérale sur la participation des cantons à la politique extérieure de la Confédération, LFPC	Legge federale concernente la partecipazione dei Cantoni alla politica estera della Confederazione, LFPC
SR 142.51 – Federal law on the common information system for foreigners and asylum seekers	2003	2006	Establishes a common information system for the management of foreigners and asylum seekers	14 Citizenship, residence, permanent residence	Bundesgesetz über das Informationssystem für den Ausländer- und den Asylbereich, BGIAA	Loi fédérale sur le système d’information commun aux domaines des étrangers et de l’asile, LDEA	Legge federale sul sistema d’informazione per il settore degli stranieri e dell’asilo, LSISA
SR 143.1 – Identity Documents Act	2001	2002	Regulates the issuance of passports and identity cards	14 Citizenship, residence, permanent residence	Ausweisgesetz, AwG	Loi sur les documents d’identité, LDI	Legge sui documenti d’identità, LDI
SR 142.20 – Federal Act on Foreign Nationals and Integration (FNIA)	2005	2008	Regulates the immigration, residence and integration of foreign nationals	14 Citizenship, residence, permanent residence	Ausländer- und Integrationsgesetz, AIG	Loi fédérale sur les étrangers et l’intégration, LEI	Legge federale sugli stranieri e la loro integrazione, LStrI
SR 142.31 – Asylum Act (AsylA)	1998	1999	Governs the procedures for granting asylum to refugees	14 Citizenship, residence, permanent residence	Asylgesetz, AsylG	Loi sur l’asile, LAsi	Legge sull’asilo, LAsi
SR 151.3 – Disability Discrimination Act (DDA)	2002	2004	Prohibits discrimination against people with disabilities and establishes the Federal Bureau for the Equality of Persons with Disabilities	15 Fundamental rights	Behindertengleichstellungsgesetz, BehiG	Loi sur l’égalité pour les handicapés, LHand	Legge sui disabili, LDis
SR 152.1 – Archiving Act (ArchA)	1998	1999	Governs the management, preservation, and accessibility of public Swiss Federal Archives	15 Fundamental rights	Archivierungsgesetz, BGA	Loi fédérale sur l’archivage, LAr	Legge sull’archiviazione, LAr
SR 151.1 – Gender Equality Act (GEA)	1995	1996	Promotes equal rights and opportunities for men and women, prohibits discrimination between women and men in employment relationships, establishes the Federal Office for Gender Equality (FOGE)	15 Fundamental rights	Gleichstellungsgesetz, GlG	Loi sur l’égalité, LEg	Legge federale sulla parità dei sessi, LPar
SR 152.3 – Freedom of Information Act (FoIA)	2004	2006	Guarantees the right of access to information held by federal authorities	15 Fundamental rights	Öffentlichkeitsgesetz, BGÖ	Loi sur la transparence, LTrans	Legge sulla trasparenza, LTras
SR 150.1 – Federal Act on the Commission for the Prevention of Torture	2009	2010	Establishes the National Commission for the Prevention of Torture, responsible to ensure the respect of the UN Convention Against Torture	15 Fundamental rights	Bundesgesetz über die Kommission zur Verhütung von Folter	Loi fédérale sur la Commission de prévention de la torture	Legge federale sulla Commissione per la prevenzione della tortura
SR 150.2 – Federal Law on the International Convention for the Protection of All Persons from Enforced Disappearance	2015	2017	Transposes the International Convention for the Protection of All Persons from Enforced Disappearance into national law	15 Fundamental rights	Bundesgesetz zum Internationalen Übereinkommen zum Schutz aller Personen vor dem Verschwindenlassen	Loi fédérale relative à la Convention internationale pour la protection de toutes les personnes contre les disparitions forcées	Legge federale relativa alla Convenzione internazionale per la protezione di tutte le persone dalla sparizione forzata
SR 161.1 – Political Rights Act (PRA)	1976	1978	Regulates the exercise of political rights, including referendums, popular initiatives, and elections	16 Political rights	Bundesgesetz über die politischen Rechte, BPR	Loi fédérale sur les droits politiques, LDP	Legge federale sui diritti politici, LDP
SR 170.512 – Publications Act (PublA)	2004	2005	Governs the publication of the compilations of federal law (Official Compilation and Systematic Compilation) and of the Federal Gazette	17 Federal authorities	Publikationsgesetz, PublG	Loi sur les publications officielles, LPubl	Legge sulle pubblicazioni ufficiali, LPubb
SR 172.010.31 – Federal Act on the Status and Tasks of the Swiss Federal Institute of Intellectual Property (IPIA)	1995	1996	Establishes the Swiss Federal Institute of Intellectual Property	17 Federal authorities	Bundesgesetz über Statut und Aufgaben des Eidgenössischen Instituts für Geistiges Eigentum, IGEG	Loi fédérale sur le statut et les tâches de l’Institut Fédéral de la Propriété Intellectuelle, LIPI	Legge federale sullo statuto e sui compiti dell’Istituto federale della proprietà intellettuale, LIPI
SR 173.41 – Patent Court Act (PatCA)	2009	2010	Establishes the Federal Patent Court	17 Federal authorities	Patentgerichtsgesetz, PatGG	Loi sur le Tribunal fédéral des brevets, LTFB	Legge sul Tribunale federale dei brevetti, LTFB
SR 172.021 – Administrative Procedure Act (APA)	1968	1969	Regulates the procedures followed by federal administrative authorities when making decisions that affect the rights of individuals	17 Federal authorities	Verwaltungsverfahrensgesetz, VwVG	Loi fédérale sur la procédure administrative, PA	Legge federale sulla procedura amministrativa, PA
SR 171.10 – Parliament Act (ParlA)	2002	2003	Clarifies the rights, duties, tasks, organization and procedure of the Federal Assembly, as well as the division of power between the Federal Assembly, the Federal Council, and the Federal courts	17 Federal authorities	Parlamentsgesetz, ParlG	Loi sur le Parlement, LParl	Legge sul Parlamento, LParl
SR 172.056.1 – Public Procurement Act (PPA)	2019	2021	Governs the awarding of public contracts by Swiss federal authorities, and transposes the WTO's Agreement on Government Procurement (GPA) into Swiss law	17 Federal authorities	Bundesgesetz über das öffentliche Beschaffungswesen, BöB	Loi fédérale sur les marchés publics, LMP	Legge federale sugli appalti pubblici, LAPub
SR 172.010 – Government and Administration Organisation Act (GAOA)	1997	1997	Clarifies the rights, duties, tasks, organization and procedure of the Federal Council and the Federal Administration	17 Federal authorities	Regierungs- und Verwaltungsorganisationsgesetz, RVOG	Loi sur l’organisation du gouvernement et de l’administration, LOGA	Legge sull’organizzazione del Governo e dell’Amministrazione, LOGA
SR 170.32 – Liability Act	1958	1959	Regulates the liability of the Federal Administration for the acts of its officials	17 Federal authorities	Verantwortlichkeitsgesetz, VG	Loi sur la responsabilité, LRCF	Legge sulla responsabilità, LResp
SR 171.21 – Resources Allocated to Parliamentarians Act	1988	1988	Regulates the compensation and allowances paid to members of the Swiss Parliament	17 Federal authorities	Parlamentsressourcengesetz, PRG	Loi sur les moyens alloués aux parlementaires, LMAP	Legge sulle indennità parlamentari, LI
SR 172.061 – Consultation Procedure Act, CPA	2005	2005	Regulates the consultation procedure used by the Federal administration to obtain input from the public on proposed legislation and other government measures	17 Federal authorities	Vernehmlassungsgesetz, VlG	Loi sur la consultation, LCo	Legge sulla consultazione, LCo
SR 172.121 – Federal Act concerning the salaries and Occupational Pensions for Judges	1989	1990	Regulates the salaries and pension provisions of federal judges and magistrates	17 Federal authorities	Bundesgesetz über Besoldung und berufliche Vorsorge der Magistratspersonen	Loi fédérale concernant les traitements et la prévoyance professionnelle des magistrats	Legge federale concernente la retribuzione e la previdenza professionale dei magistrati
SR 172.220.1 – Federal Personnel Act (FPA)	2000	2001	Governs the working relationship between the Confederation and its personnel	17 Federal authorities	Bundespersonalgesetz, BPG	Loi sur le personnel de la Confédération, LPers	Legge sul personale federale, LPers
SR 173.110 – Federal Supreme Court Act	2005	2007	Governs the organization and internal functioning of the Swiss Federal Supreme Court	17 Federal authorities	Bundesgerichtsgesetz, BGG	Loi sur le Tribunal fédéral, LTF	Legge sul Tribunale federale, LTF
SR 173.110.3 – Federal Act on the calculation of time limits that include a Saturday	1963	1963	Requires that the calculation of federal legal deadlines considers Saturday as a public holiday. Shortest federal law with only 2 articles.	17 Federal authorities	Bundesgesetz über den Fristenlauf an Samstagen	Loi fédérale sur la supputation des délais comprenant un samedi	Legge federale sulla decorrenza dei termini nei giorni di sabato
SR 173.32 – Federal Administrative Court Act	2005	2007	Governs the organization and functioning of the Swiss Federal Administrative Court	17 Federal authorities	Verwaltungsgerichtsgesetz, VGG	Loi sur le Tribunal administratif fédéral, LTAF	Legge sul Tribunale amministrativo federale, LTAF
SR 173.71 – Criminal Authorities Organization Act	2010	2011	Governs the organization, tasks and procedures of the federal criminal authorities, including Fedpol, the Office of the Attorney General (OAG), and the Federal Criminal Court	17 Federal authorities	Strafbehördenorganisationsgesetz, StBOG	Loi sur l’organisation des autorités pénales, LOAP	Legge sull’organizzazione delle autorità penali, LOAP
SR 196.1 – Foreign Illicit Assets Act (FIAA)	2015	2016	Provides for the freezing, confiscation and restitution of assets of foreign politically exposed persons that have been acquired through corruption or other criminal means, and deposited in Swiss banks	19 Foreign affairs	Bundesgesetz über die Sperrung und die Rückerstattung unrechtmässig erworbener Vermögenswerte ausländischer politisch exponierter Personen (SRVG)	Loi sur les valeurs patrimoniales d’origine illicite, LVP	Legge sui valori patrimoniali di provenienza illecita, LVP
SR 192.12 – Host State Act (HSA)	2007	2008	Governs the granting of privileges, immunities and financial support to foreign representations, international organizations and conferences	19 Foreign affairs	Gaststaatgesetz, GSG	Loi sur l’État hôte, LEH	Legge sullo Stato ospite, LSO
SR 195.1 – Swiss Abroad Act (SAA)	2014	2015	Governs the consular protection and services to Swiss abroad, and the measures supporting their political rights	19 Foreign affairs	Auslandschweizergesetz, ASG	Loi sur les Suisses de l’étranger, LSEtr	Legge sugli Svizzeri all’estero, LSEst
SR 198.1 – Federal Act on the implementation of the Protocol on Environmental Protection to the Antarctic Treaty	2016	2017	Transposes the Protocol on Environmental Protection to the Antarctic Treaty of 1991 into national law	19 Foreign affairs	Bundesgesetz über die Umsetzung des Umweltschutzprotokolls zum Antarktis-Vertrag	Loi fédérale sur la mise en œuvre du protocole au traité sur l’Antarctique, relatif à la protection de l’environnement	Legge federale concernente l’attuazione del Protocollo sulla protezione ambientale relativo al Trattato sull’Antartide
SR 194.2 – Federal Act on the Promotion of the Conditions for the Establishment of Businesses in Switzerland	2007	2008	Defines the promotion measures (e.g., publications, marketing, information sharing) that the confederation can take to encourage companies to establish themselves in Switzerland	19 Foreign affairs	Bundesgesetz zur Förderung der Information über den Unternehmensstandort Schweiz	Loi fédérale concernant la promotion des conditions d’implantation des entreprises en Suisse	Legge federale che promuove l’informazione riguardante la piazza imprenditoriale svizzera
SR 194.1 – Federal Act on the Promotion of the Image of Switzerland Abroad	2000	2000	Defines the tasks of the FDFA to promote the image and knowledge of Switzerland abroad	19 Foreign affairs	Bundesgesetz über die Pflege des schweizerischen Erscheinungsbildes im Ausland	Loi fédérale sur la promotion de l’image de la Suisse à l’étranger	Legge federale concernente la promozione dell’immagine della Svizzera all’estero
SR 193.9 – Federal Act on Civil Peace Promotion Measures and Human Rights Strengthening	2003	2004	Governs the Confederation's foreign policy activities to promote peace and strengthen human rights. With a 2021 amendment, also establishes the National human rights institution (NHRI)	19 Foreign affairs	Bundesgesetz über Massnahmen zur zivilen Friedensförderung und Stärkung der Menschenrechte	Loi fédérale sur des mesures de promotion civile de la paix et de renforcement des droits de l’homme	Legge federale su misure di promozione civile della pace e di rafforzamento dei diritti dell’uomo
SR 211.423.4 – Issuance of Mortgage Bonds Act	1930	1931	Governs the issuance of mortgage bonds	21 Civil code	Pfandbriefgesetz, PfG	Loi sur l’émission de lettres de gage, LLG	Legge sulle obbligazioni fondiarie, LOF
SR 211.412.11 – Federal Act on Rural Land Law	1991	1994	Governs the ownership and use of agricultural land in Switzerland	21 Civil code	Bundesgesetz über das bäuerliche Bodenrecht, BGBB	Loi fédérale sur le droit foncier rural, LDFR	Legge federale sul diritto fondiario rurale, LDFR
SR 211.221.31 – Federal Act on the Hague Adoption Convention and on Measures for the Protection of Children in Cases of Intercountry Adoption	2001	2003	Transposes the Hague Adoption Convention into national law	21 Civil code	Bundesgesetz zum Haager Adoptionsübereinkommen und über Massnahmen zum Schutz des Kindes bei internationalen Adoptionen, BG-HAÜ	Loi fédérale relative à la Convention de La Haye sur l’adoption et aux mesures de protection de l’enfant en cas d’adoption internationale, LF-CLaH	Legge federale relativa alla Convenzione dell’Aia sull’adozione e a provvedimenti per la protezione del minore nelle adozioni internazionalim, LF-CAA
SR 211.222.32 – Federal Act on International Child Abduction and the Hague Conventions on the Protection of Children and Adults	2007	2009	Transposes the Hague Protection of Adults Convention into national law	21 Civil code	Bundesgesetz über internationale Kindesentführung und die Haager Übereinkommen zum Schutz von Kindern und Erwachsenen, BG-KKE	Loi fédérale sur l’enlèvement international d’enfants et les Conventions de La Haye sur la protection des enfants et des adultes, LF-EEA	Legge federale sul rapimento internazionale dei minori e sulle Convenzioni dell’Aia sulla protezione dei minori e degli adulti, LF-RMA
SR 211.223.13 – Federal Act on Compulsory Social Measures and Placements prior to 1981, CSMPA	2016	2017	Acknowledges and redress the injustice suffered by victims of compulsory social measures and placements in Switzerland prior to 1981	21 Civil code	Bundesgesetz über die Aufarbeitung der fürsorgerischen Zwangsmassnahmen und Fremdplatzierungen vor 1981, AFZFG	Loi fédérale sur les mesures de coercition à des fins d’assistance et les placements extrafamiliaux antérieurs à 1981, LMCFA	Legge federale sulle misure coercitive a scopo assistenziale e i collocamenti extrafamiliari prima del 1981, LMCCE
SR 211.231 – Same-Sex Partnership Act (SSPA)	2004	2007	Introduced same-sex registered partnerships. Mostly repealed in 2022; now governs the transformation of partnership into marriage	21 Civil code	Partnerschaftsgesetz, PartG	Loi sur le partenariat, LPart	Legge sull’unione domestica registrata, LUD
SR 211.111.1 – Sterilization Act	2004	2005	Defines the conditions under which sterilization is authorized for contraceptive purposes, as well as the applicable procedure	21 Civil code	Sterilisationsgesetz	Loi sur la stérilisation	Legge federale sulle sterilizzazioni
SR 211.412.41 – Lex Koller (Federal Act on Acquisition of Real Estate by Persons Abroad)	1983	1985	Limits the acquisition of real estate by persons abroad	21 Civil code	Bundesgesetz über den Erwerb von Grundstücken durch Personen im Ausland, BewG	Loi fédérale sur l'acquisition d'immeubles par des personnes à l'étranger, LFAIE	Legge federale sull’acquisto di fondi da parte di persone all’estero, LAFE
SR 220 – Federal Act on the Amendment of the Swiss Civil Code (Part Five: The Code of Obligations)	1911	1912	Introduces the code of obligations (5th part of the civil code), the main legislation regulating Contract Law	22 Code of Obligations	Bundesgesetz betreffend die Ergänzung des Schweizerischen Zivilgesetzbuches (Fünfter Teil: Obligationenrecht)	Loi fédérale complétant le Code civil suisse (Livre cinquième: Droit des obligations)	Legge federale di complemento del Codice civile svizzero (Libro quinto: Diritto delle obbligazioni)
SR 221.302 – Audit Supervision Act	2005	2007	Governs the accreditation and supervision auditors	22 Code of Obligations	Revisionsaufsichtsgesetz, RAG	Loi sur la surveillance de la révision, LSR	Legge sui revisori, LSR
SR 221.301 – Merger Act	2003	2004	Regulates the adaptation of the legal structures of companies that undergo mergers, splits, conversions and transfers of assets	22 Code of Obligations	Fusionsgesetz, FusG	Loi sur la fusion, LFus	Legge sulla fusione, LFus
SR 221.229.1 – Insurance Contract Act	1908	1910	Regulates insurance policies	22 Code of Obligations	Versicherungsvertragsgesetz, VVG	Loi sur le contrat d’assurance, LCA	Legge sul contratto d’assicurazione, LCA
SR 221.215.311 – Federal Act on the Extension of the Scope of Application of Collective Bargaining Agreements	1956	1957	Allows the government to extend the scope of application of collective bargaining agreements to employers and workers who are not party to the agreement	22 Code of Obligations	Bundesgesetz über die Allgemeinverbindlicherklärung von Gesamtarbeitsverträgen	Loi fédérale permettant d’étendre le champ d’application de la convention collective de travail	Legge federale concernente il conferimento del carattere obbligatorio generale al contratto collettivo di lavoro
SR 221.214.1 – Federal Consumer Credit Act	2001	2003	Regulates Consumer Credit contracts	22 Code of Obligations	Bundesgesetz über den Konsumkredit, KKG	Loi fédérale sur le crédit à la consommation, LCC	Legge federale sul credito al consumo, LCC
SR 221.112.944 – Product Liability Act	1993	1994	Establishes a legal framework for product liability, setting out the legal responsibility of manufacturers and importers for the safety of their products	22 Code of Obligations	Produktehaftpflichtgesetz, PrHG	Loi fédérale sur la responsabilité du fait des produits, LRFP	Legge federale sulla responsabilità per danno da prodotti, LRDP
SR 221.213.15 – Federal Act on framework rental agreements and their declaration of general binding force	1995	1996	Regulates framework agreements between associations of landlords and tenants	22 Code of Obligations	Bundesgesetz über Rahmenmietverträge und deren Allgemeinverbindlicherklärung	Loi fédérale sur les contrats-cadres de baux à loyer et leur déclaration de force obligatoire générale	Legge federale sui contratti-quadro di locazione e sul conferimento dell’obbligatorietà generale
SR 221.213.2 – Federal Act on Agricultural Leases	1985	1986	Regulates the rental of agricultural land	22 Code of Obligations	Bundesgesetz über die landwirtschaftliche Pacht, LPG	Loi fédérale sur le bail à ferme agricole, LBFA	Legge federale sull’affitto agricolo, LAAgr
SR 231.1 – Copyright Act, CopA	1992	1993	Governs authors' rights	23 Intellectual property and data protection	Urheberrechtsgesetz, URG	Loi sur le droit d’auteur, LDA	Legge sul diritto d’autore, LDA
SR 231.2 – Topographies Act	1992	1993	Governs the protection of layout designs (topographies) of integrated circuits	23 Intellectual property and data protection	Topographiengesetz, ToG	Loi sur les topographies, LTo	Legge sulle topografie, LTo
SR 232.11 – Trade Mark Protection Act, TmPA	1992	1993	Governs trademark protection	23 Intellectual property and data protection	Markenschutzgesetz, MSchG	Loi sur la protection des marques, LPM	Legge sulla protezione dei marchi, LPM
SR 232.12 – Designs Act, DesA	2001	2002	Governs the protection of product designs	23 Intellectual property and data protection	Designgesetz, DesG	Loi sur les designs, LDes	Legge sul design, LDes
SR 232.14 – Patents Act, PatA	1954	1956	Governs Patent Law	23 Intellectual property and data protection	Patentgesetz, PatG	Loi sur les brevets, LBI	Legge sui brevetti, LBI
SR 232.16 – Plant Variety Protection Act	1975	1977	Governs plant breeders' rights and implements the UPOV convention	23 Intellectual property and data protection	Sortenschutzgesetz	Loi fédérale sur la protection des obtentions végétales	Legge federale sulla protezione delle novità vegetali
SR 232.21 – Coat of Arms Protection Act, CAPA	2013	2017	Governs the protection of the Swiss Coat of Arms, the Swiss flag, and other emblems of the confederation, cantons and municipalities	23 Intellectual property and data protection	Wappenschutzgesetz, WSchG	Loi sur la protection des armoiries, LPAP	Legge sulla protezione degli stemmi, LPSt
SR 232.22 – Federal Act concerning the protection of the emblem and Name of the Red Cross	1954	1955	Restricts the use of the emblem and name of the Red Cross outside of the personnel and material protected by the Geneva Convention of 1949	23 Intellectual property and data protection	Bundesgesetz betreffend den Schutz des Zeichens und des Namens des Roten Kreuzes	Loi fédérale concernant la protection de l’emblème et du nom de la Croix-Rouge	Legge federale concernente la protezione dell’emblema e del nome della Croce Rossa
SR 232.23 – Federal Act concerning the protection of the names and emblems of the United Nations and Other Intergovernmental Organizations	1961	1962	Governs the protection of the name and emblems of the United Nations	23 Intellectual property and data protection	Bundesgesetz zum Schutz von Namen und Zeichen der Organisation der Vereinten Nationen und anderer zwischenstaatlicher Organisationen	Loi fédérale concernant la protection des noms et emblèmes de l’Organisation des Nations Unies et d’autres organisations intergouvernementales	Legge federale concernente la protezione dei nomi e degli emblemi dell’Organizzazione delle Nazioni Unite e d’altre organizzazioni intergovernative
SR 235.1 – Federal Act on Data Protection, FADP	1992	1993	Governs information privacy and data processing	23 Intellectual property and data protection	Bundesgesetz über den Datenschutz, DSG	Loi fédérale sur la protection des données, LPD	Legge federale sulla protezione dei dati, LPD
SR 235.2 – Federal Act on the processing of personal data by the Federal Department of Foreign Affairs	2020	2021	Regulates data processing by the FDFA	23 Intellectual property and data protection	Bundesgesetz über die Bearbeitung von Personendaten durch das Eidgenössische Departement für auswärtige Angelegenheiten	Loi fédérale sur le traitement des données personnelles par le Département fédéral des affaires étrangères	Legge federale sul trattamento dei dati personali da parte del Dipartimento federale degli affari esteri
SR 235.3 – Schengen Data Protection Act	2018	2019	Regulates data processing in the context of the implementation of the Schengen Agreement	23 Intellectual property and data protection	Schengen-Datenschutzgesetz, SDSG	Loi sur la protection des données Schengen, LPDS	Legge sulla protezione dei dati in ambito Schengen, LPDS
SR 241 – Unfair Competition Act, UCA	1986	1988	Prohibits anti- competitive practices (outside of collusion)	24 Unfair Competition	Bundesgesetz gegen den unlauteren Wettbewerb, UWG	Loi fédérale contre la concurrence déloyale, LCD	Legge federale contro la concorrenza sleale, LCSl
SR 251 – Cartel Act, CartA	1995	1996	Restricts collusion between companies (prevention of cartels)	25 Cartels	Kartellgesetz, KG	Loi sur les cartels, LCart	Legge sui cartelli, LCart
SR 273 – Federal Act of Federal Civil Procedure	1947	1948	Defines the procedures for cases presented to the Swiss Federal Supreme Court	27 Civil Procedure	Bundesgesetz über den Bundeszivilprozess	Loi fédérale de procédure civile fédérale	Legge di procedura civile federale
SR 281.1 – Federal Act on debt collection and bankruptcy	1889	1892	Regulates debt collection and bankruptcy	28 Debt Collection and Bankruptcy	Bundesgesetz über Schuldbetreibung und Konkurs, SchKG	Loi fédérale sur la poursuite pour dettes et la faillite, LP	Legge federale sulla esecuzione e sul fallimento, LEF
SR 282.11 – Federal Law regulating debt collection against the municipalities and other communities under cantonal public law	1947	1949	Regulates debt collection against municipalities and cantonal authorities	28 Debt Collection and Bankruptcy	Bundesgesetz über die Schuldbetreibung gegen Gemeinden und andere Körperschaften des kantonalen öffentlichen Rechts	Loi fédérale réglant la poursuite pour dettes contre les communes et autres collectivités de droit public cantonal	Legge federale sull’esecuzione per debiti contro i Comuni e altri enti di diritto pubblico cantonale
SR 291 – Federal Act on Private International Law, PILA	1987	1989	Regulates conflicts of laws (e.g., for citizenship, marriage, property law, succession law)	29 Private International Law	Bundesgesetz über das Internationale Privatrecht, IPRG	Loi fédérale sur le droit international privé, LDIP	Legge federale sul diritto internazionale privato, LDIP
SR 312.1 – Criminal procedure applicable to minors	2009	2011	Regulates criminal procedure for minors	31 Ordinary criminal law	Jugendstrafprozessordnung, JStPO	Procédure pénale applicable aux mineurs, PPMin	Procedura penale minorile, PPMin
SR 312.2 – Federal Act on Extrajudicial Witness Protection	2011	2013	Regulates witness protection	31 Ordinary criminal law	Bundesgesetz über den ausserprozessualen Zeugenschutz, ZeugSG	Loi fédérale sur la protection extraprocédurale des témoins, Ltém	Legge federale sulla protezione extraprocessuale dei testimoni, LPTes
SR 312.4 – Federal Act on the Sharing of Confiscated Assets	2004	2004	Defines conditions for sharing seized assets between the Confederation, the cantons and foreign states	31 Ordinary criminal law	Bundesgesetz über die Teilung eingezogener Vermögenswerte, TEVG	Loi fédérale sur le partage des valeurs patrimoniales confisquées, LVPC	Legge federale sulla ripartizione dei valori patrimoniali confiscati, LRVC
SR 312.5 – Victims' Assistance Act	2007	2009	Defines crime victims' rights for assistance and compensation (from the perpetrator and the state)	31 Ordinary criminal law	Opferhilfegesetz, OHG	Loi sur l’aide aux victimes, LAVI	Legge federale concernente l’aiuto alle vittime di reati, LAV
SR 313.0 – Federal Act on Administrative Criminal Law	1974	1975	Regulates criminal procedures initiated by federal authorities	31 Ordinary criminal law	Bundesgesetz über das Verwaltungsstrafrecht, VStrR	Loi fédérale sur le droit pénal administratif, DPA	Legge federale sul diritto penale amministrativo, DPA
SR 314.1 – Orderly Fines Act	2016	2018	Regulates the simplified procedure for small contraventions	31 Ordinary criminal law	Ordnungsbussengesetz, OBG	Loi sur les amendes d’ordre, LAO	Legge sulle multe disciplinari, LMD
SR 411.3 – Federal Act on contributions to the Cantonal School of the French Language in Bern	2022	2023	Governs the funding of the Confederation to the Cantonal School of the French Language in Bern	41 Schools	Bundesgesetz über die Beiträge an die kantonale Schule französischer Sprache in Bern	Loi fédérale sur les contributions à l’École cantonale de langue française de Berne	Legge federale sui contributi alla Scuola cantonale di lingua francese di Berna
SR 412.10 – Vocational and Professional Education and Training Act, VPETA	2002	2004	Regulates vocational education and professional education	41 Schools	Berufsbildungsgesetz, BBG	Loi fédérale sur la formation professionnelle, LFPr	Legge sulla formazione professionale, LFPr
SR 412.106 – Swiss Federal University for Vocation Educations and Training Act	2020	2021	Governs the Swiss Federal University for Vocation Educations and Training (SFUVET)	41 Schools	EHB-Gesetz	Loi sur la HEFP	Legge sulla SUFFP
SR 416.2 – Federal Act concerning the granting of scholarships to foreign students and artists in Switzerland	1987	1988	Governs the granting of scholarships to foreign students	41 Schools	Bundesgesetz über Stipendien an ausländische Studierende und Kunstschaffende in der Schweiz	Loi fédérale concernant l’attribution de bourses à des étudiants et artistes étrangers en Suisse	Legge federale sulle borse di studio a studenti e artisti stranieri in Svizzera
SR 418.0 – Swiss schools abroad Act	2014	2015	Governs measures that the Confederation can take to promote Swiss educational institutes abroad	41 Schools	Schweizerschulengesetz, SSchG	Loi sur les écoles suisses à l’étranger, LESE	Legge sulle scuole svizzere all’estero, LSSE
SR 419.1 – Federal Act on Continuing Education	2014	2017	Governs and promotes continuing education	41 Schools	Bundesgesetz über die Weiterbildung, WeBiG	Loi fédérale sur la formation continue, LFCo	Legge federale sulla formazione continua, LFCo
SR 410.2 – Act on Cooperation in the Swiss Education Area	2016	2017	Allows the Confederation to sign a convention with cantons to cooperate in education topics	41 Schools	Bildungszusammenarbeitsgesetz, BiZG	Loi sur la coopération dans l’espace suisse de formation, LCESF	Legge sulla collaborazione nello spazio formativo svizzero, LCSFS
SR 510.10 – Army Act	1995	1996	Governs the Swiss Armed Forces	51 Military defence	Militärgesetz, MG	Loi sur l’armée, LAAM	Legge militare, LM
SR 510.62 – Geoinformation Act, GeoIA	2007	2008	Ensures that geodata related to the Swiss territory is made available for the public and key stakeholders	51 Military defence	Geoinformationsgesetz, GeoIG	Loi sur la géoinformation, LGéo	Legge sulla geoinformazione, LGI
SR 510.91 – Federal Act on the information systems of the army and of the DDPS	2008	2010	Regulates data processing by the Swiss Armed Forces and DDPS	51 Military defence	Bundesgesetz über militärische und andere Informationssysteme im VBS, MIG	Loi fédérale sur les systèmes d’information de l’armée et du DDPS, LSIA	Legge federale sui sistemi d’informazione militari e su altri sistemi d’informazione nel DDPS, LSIM
SR 514.51 – War Mat Act, WMA	1996	1998	Regulates the manufacture and transfer of war materiel and related technology	51 Military defence	Kriegsmaterialgesetz, KMG	Loi fédérale sur le matériel de guerre, LFMG	Legge federale sul materiale bellico, LMB
SR 514.54 – Weapons Act, WA	1997	1999	Regulates the acquisition, import, export, storage, possession, carrying, transport, brokerage, manufacture of, and trade of weapons and ammunitions	51 Military defence	Waffengesetz, WG	Loi sur les armes, LArm	Legge sulle armi, LArm
SR 515.08 – Federal Act on Support for the Elimination and Non-Proliferation of Chemical Weapons	2003	2003	Allows the Confederation to support other countries (primarily Russia) in complying with the Chemical Weapons Convention	51 Military defence	Bundesgesetz über die Unterstützung der Abrüstung und Nonproliferation von Chemiewaffen	Loi fédérale sur le soutien à l’élimination et à la non-prolifération des armes chimiques	Legge federale sul sostegno al disarmo e alla non-proliferazione delle armi chimiche
SR 520.1 – Federal Act on the protection of the population and civil protection	2019	2021	Defines the tasks of the Confederation and cantons regarding civil defense, and regulates the Civil Protection organization	52 Protection of the population and civil protection	Bevölkerungs- und Zivilschutzgesetz, BZG	Loi fédérale sur la protection de la population et sur la protection civile, LPPCi	Legge federale sulla protezione della popolazione e sulla protezione civile, LPPC
SR 520.3 – Federal Act on the Protection of Cultural Property in the Event of Armed Conflict, Disaster or Emergency	2014	2015	Defines protection measures to be taken to protect Swiss cultural assets in emergency situations	52 Protection of the population and civil protection	Bundesgesetz über den Schutz der Kulturgüter bei bewaffneten Konflikten, bei Katastrophen und in Notlagen	Loi fédérale sur la protection des biens culturels en cas de conflit armé, de catastrophe ou de situation d’urgence, LPBC	Legge federale sulla protezione dei beni culturali in caso di conflitti armati, catastrofi e situazioni d’emergenza, LPBC
SR 531 – National Economic Supply Act, NESA	2016	2017	Regulates the measures ensuring the supply of essential goods and services in times of serious shortage	53 National economic supply	Landesversorgungsgesetz, LVG	Loi sur l’approvisionnement du pays, LAP	Legge sull’approvvigionamento del Paese, LAP
SR 611.0 – Federal Budget Act	2005	2006	Regulates the management of the Confederation's finances, the financial management of the administration and the preparation of the accounts	61 Finance – General Organisation	Finanzhaushaltgesetz, FHG	Loi sur les finances, LFC	Legge federale sulle finanze della Confederazione, LFC
SR 611.010 – Federal Act instituting measures to improve federal finances	1974	1965	Allows the Confederation to take special measures to improve Finances (most articles have been abrogated)	61 Finance – General Organisation	Bundesgesetz über Massnahmen zur Verbesserung des Bundeshaushaltes	Loi fédérale instituant des mesures destinées à améliorer les finances fédérales	Legge federale a sostegno di provvedimenti per migliorare le finanze federali
SR 613.2 – Federal Act on Financial Equalization and Compensation of Burdens	2003	2005	Introduces Equalization Payments to redistribute financial resources both between the Confederation and cantons	61 Finance – General Organisation	Bundesgesetz über den Finanz- und Lastenausgleich, FiLaG	Loi fédérale sur la péréquation financière et la compensation des charges, PFCC	Legge federale concernente la perequazione finanziaria e la compensazione degli oneri, LPFC
SR 614.0 – Financial Control Act	1967	1968	Defines the tasks, responsibilities and processes of the Swiss Federal Audit Office	61 Finance – General Organisation	Finanzkontrollgesetz, FKG	Loi sur le Contrôle des finances, LCF	Legge sul Controllo delle finanze, LCF
SR 616.1 – Subsidies Act	1990	1991	Defines the conditions under which the federal government is allowed to provide subsidies	61 Finance – General Organisation	Subventionsgesetz, SuG	Loi sur les subventions, LSu	Legge sui sussidi, LSu
SR 631.0 – Customs Act	2005	2007	Regulates Swiss customs (incl. movement of goods and people)	63 Finance -Customs	Zollgesetz, ZG	Loi sur les douanes, LD	Legge sulle dogane, LD
SR 632.10 – Customs Tariff Act, CTA	1986	1988	Regulates Customs tariffs	63 Finance -Customs	Zolltarifgesetz, ZTG	Loi sur le tarif des douanes, LTaD	Legge sulla tariffa delle dogane, LTD
SR 632.91 – Preferential Tariffs Act	1981	1982	Allows the granting of reduced tariffs for developing countries	63 Finance -Customs	Zollpräferenzengesetz	Loi sur les préférences tarifaires	Legge sulle preferenze tariffali
SR 641.10 – Federal Stamp Duty Act	1973	1974	Regulates stamp duties	64 Finance – Taxation	Bundesgesetz über die Stempelabgaben, StG	Loi fédérale sur les droits de timbre, LT	Legge federale sulle tasse di bollo, LTB
SR 641.20 – Value Added Tax Act, VAT Act	2009	2010	Regulates VAT	64 Finance – Taxation	Mehrwertsteuergesetz, MWSTG	Loi sur la TVA, LTVA	Legge sull’IVA, LIVA
SR 641.203 – Federal Act on the increase of value-added tax rates in favor of the OASI	1998	1999	Introduces a one-time increase of VAT to fund the old-age and survivors' insurance (OASI)	64 Finance – Taxation	Bundesgesetz über die Anhebung der Mehrwertsteuersätze für die AHV	Loi fédérale sur le relèvement des taux de la taxe sur la valeur ajoutée en faveur de l’AVS	Legge federale RU LLL sull’aumento delle aliquote dell’imposta sul valore aggiunto a favore dell’AVS
SR 641.31 – Tobacco Taxation Act	1969	1970	Regulates the taxation of tobacco	64 Finance – Taxation	Tabaksteuergesetz, TStG	Loi fédérale sur l’imposition du tabac, LTab	Legge sull’imposizione del tabacco, LImT
SR 641.411 – Beer Taxation Act	2006	2007	Regulates the taxation of beer	64 Finance – Taxation	Biersteuergesetz, BStG	Loi fédérale sur l’imposition de la bière, LIB	Legge sull’imposizione della birra, LIB
SR 641.51 – Motor Vehicles Taxation Act	1996	1997	Regulates the taxation of motor vehicles	64 Finance – Taxation	Automobilsteuergesetz, AStG	Loi fédérale sur l’imposition des véhicules automobiles, Limpauto	Legge federale sull’imposizione degli autoveicoli, LIAut
SR 641.61 – Mineral Oils Taxation Act	1996	1997	Regulates the taxation of mineral oils	64 Finance – Taxation	Mineralölsteuergesetz, MinöStG	Loi sur l’imposition des huiles minérales, Limpmin	Legge federale sull’imposizione degli oli minerali, LIOm
SR 641.71 – CO2 Act	2011	2013	Regulates carbon dioxide emissions to mitigate climate change, notably through the introduction of a carbon tax	64 Finance – Taxation	CO2-Gesetz	Loi sur le CO2	Legge sul CO2
SR 641.81 – Heavy Vehicle Fee Act	1997	2000	Regulates taxation of heavy vehicles to offset costs from that traffic and fund rail transport	64 Finance – Taxation	Schwerverkehrsabgabegesetz, SVAG	Loi relative à une redevance sur le trafic des poids lourds, LRPL	Legge sul traffico pesante, LTTP
SR 641.91 – Taxation of Savings Act	2004	2005	Implements the EU agreement on the taxation of savings (bilateral II agreements) by regulating the administrative assistance between Switzerland and the EU in the case of tax fraud	64 Finance – Taxation	Zinsbesteuerungsgesetz, ZBstG	Loi sur la fiscalité de l’épargne, LFisE	Legge sulla fiscalità del risparmio, LFR
SR 641.92 – Federal Act on the repeal of the Savings Tax Act of December 17, 2004 and the International Withholding Tax Act of June 15, 2012	2016	2017	Repeals two other federal laws	64 Finance – Taxation	Bundesgesetz über die Aufhebung des Zinsbesteuerungsgesetzes vom 17. Dezember 2004 und des Bundesgesetzes vom 15. Juni 2012 über die internationale Quellenbesteuerung	Loi fédérale sur l’abrogation de la loi du 17 décembre 2004 sur la fiscalité de l’épargne et de la loi fédérale du 15 juin 2012 sur l’imposition internationale à la source	Legge federale concernente l’abrogazione della legge del 17 dicembre 2004 sulla fiscalità del risparmio e della legge del 15 giugno 2012 sull’imposizione alla fonte in ambito internazionale
SR 642.11 – Federal Act on the Federal Direct Tax	1990	1995	Regulates the Federal Direct Tax	64 Finance – Taxation	Bundesgesetz über die direkte Bundessteuer, DBG	Loi fédérale sur l’impôt fédéral direct, LIFD	Legge federale sull’imposta federale diretta, LIFD
SR 642.14 – Tax Harmonization Act	1990	1993	Regulates the direct taxation from cantons and municipalities	64 Finance – Taxation	Steuerharmonisierungsgesetz, StHG	Loi fédérale sur l’harmonisation des impôts directs des cantons et des communesm, LHID	Legge federale sull’armonizzazione delle imposte dirette dei Cantoni e dei Comuni, LAID
SR 642.21 – Withholding Tax Act	1965	1967	Regulates the federal withholding tax	64 Finance – Taxation	Verrechnungssteuergesetz, VStG	Loi fédérale sur l’impôt anticipé, LIA	Legge federale sull’imposta preventiva, LIP
SR 651.1 – Tax Administrative Assistance Act, TAAA	2012	2013	Governs the exchange of information on request or spontaneously in tax matters	65 Finance – Exchange of information on tax matters	Steueramtshilfegesetz, StAhiG	Loi sur l’assistance administrative fiscale, LAAF	Legge sull’assistenza amministrativa fiscale, LAAF
SR 653.1 – Federal Act on the International Automatic Exchange of Information in Tax Matters, AEOIA	2015	2016	Governs the automatic exchange of information in tax matters	65 Finance – Exchange of information on tax matters	Bundesgesetz über den internationalen automatischen Informationsaustausch in Steuersachen, AIAG	Loi fédérale sur l’échange international automatique de renseignements en matière fiscale, LEAR	Legge federale sullo scambio automatico internazionale di informazioni a fini fiscali, LSAI
SR 654.1 – Act on the exchange of country-by-country declarations	2017	2017	Governs the automatic exchange of information for the tax declarations of multinational companies	65 Finance – Exchange of information on tax matters	Bundesgesetz über den internationalen automatischen Austausch länderbezogener Berichte multinationaler Konzerne, ALBAG	Loi sur l’échange des déclarations pays par pays, LEDPP	Legge federale sullo scambio automatico internazionale delle rendicontazioni Paese per Paese di gruppi di imprese multinazionali, LSRPP
SR 661 – Federal Act on the Military Exemption Tax	1959	1960	Regulates the military exemption tax	66 Finance – Military exemption tax	Bundesgesetz über die Wehrpflichtersatzabgabe, WPEG	Loi fédérale sur la taxe d’exemption de l’obligation de servir, LTEO	Legge federale sulla tassa d’esenzione dall’obbligo militare, LTEO
SR 672.2 – Federal Act on the Execution of International Tax Conventions	2021	2022	Implements tax-related international conventions, including measures to avoid double taxation	67 Finance – Exclusion of tax agreements. Double taxation	Bundesgesetz über die Durchführung von internationalen Abkommen im Steuerbereich, StADG	Loi fédérale relative à l’exécution des conventions internationales dans le domaine fiscal, LECF	Legge federale concernente l’esecuzione delle convenzioni internazionali in ambito fiscale, LECF
SR 672.3 – Federal Act on the Recognition of Private Agreements for the Avoidance of Double Taxation with respect to Taxes on Income and on Capital	2011	2011	Allows the Federal Council to recognize double taxation agreements even if they are made between private institutions that are not officially recognized as a state (e.g., Taiwanese government)	67 Finance – Exclusion of tax agreements. Double taxation	Bundesgesetz über die Anerkennung privater Vereinbarungen zur Vermeidung der Doppelbesteuerung auf dem Gebiet der Steuern vom Einkommen und vom Vermögen	Loi fédérale sur la reconnaissance d’accords entre institutions privées destinés à éviter les doubles impositions en matière d’impôts sur le revenu et sur la fortune	Legge federale sul riconoscimento di convenzioni private per evitare le doppie imposizioni in materia di imposte sul reddito e sul patrimonio
SR 672.4 – Federal Act on International Withholding Tax, IWTA	2012	2012	Governs withholding taxes set in the context of international tax agreements	67 Finance – Exclusion of tax agreements. Double taxation	Bundesgesetz über die internationale Quellenbesteuerung, IQG	Loi fédérale sur l’imposition internationale à la source, LISint	Legge federale sull’imposizione alla fonte in ambito internazionale, LIFI
SR 672.933.6 – Federal Act on the Implementation of the FATCA Agreement between Switzerland and the United States, FATCA Act	2013	2014	Implements the US Foreign Account Tax Compliance Act (FATCA)	67 Finance – Exclusion of tax agreements. Double taxation	Bundesgesetz über die Umsetzung des FATCA-Abkommens zwischen der Schweiz und den Vereinigten Staaten, FATCA-Gesetz	Loi fédérale sur la mise en œuvre de l’accord FATCA entre la Suisse et les Etats-Unis, Loi FATCA	Legge federale sull’attuazione dell’Accordo FATCA tra la Svizzera e gli Stati Uniti, Legge FATCA
SR 680 – Alcohol Act	1932	1933	Regulates the manufacture, distribution, acquisition and consumption of alcoholic beverages	68 Finance – Alcohol monopoly	Alkoholgesetz, AlkG	Loi fédérale sur l’alcool, LAlc	Legge sull’alcool, LAlc
SR 700 – Spatial Planning Act, SPA	1979	1980	Regulates spatial planning (e.g., agriculture, habitations, nature conversation)	70 Public works – Energy – Transport – National, regional and local planning	Raumplanungsgesetz, RPG	Loi sur l’aménagement du territoire, LAT	Legge sulla pianificazione del territorio, LPT
SR 702 – Second Homes Act, SHA	2015	2016	Limits the constructions and conversion of second homes in communes where second homes exceed 20%	70 Public works – Energy – Transport – National, regional and local planning	Zweitwohnungsgesetz, ZWG	Loi fédérale sur les résidences secondaires, LRS	Legge sulle abitazioni secondarie, LASec
SR 704 – Federal Act on Footpaths and Hiking Trails	1985	1987	Regulates and promotes the construction and maintenance of footpaths	70 Public works – Energy – Transport – National, regional and local planning	Bundesgesetz über Fuss- und Wanderwege, FWG	Loi fédérale sur les chemins pour piétons et les chemins de randonnée pédestre, LCPR	Legge federale sui percorsi pedonali ed i sentieri, LPS
SR 705 – Cycle Routes Act	2022	2023	Regulates and promotes the construction and maintenance of cycling lanes	70 Public works – Energy – Transport – National, regional and local planning	Veloweggesetz	Loi fédérale sur les voies cyclables	Legge federale sulle vie ciclabili
SR 711 – Federal Act on Expropriation	1930	1932	Defines the conditions under which the state can use expropriation for public utility purposes	71 Public works – Energy – Transport – Expropriation	Bundesgesetz über die Enteignung, EntG	Loi fédérale sur l’expropriation, LEx	Legge federale sull’espropriazione, LEspr
SR 721.100 – Federal Act on the Arrangement of Watercourses	1991	1993	Governs measures to protect people and assets from water damage	72 Public works – Energy – Transport – Public works	Bundesgesetz über den Wasserbau	Loi fédérale sur l’aménagement des cours d’eau	Legge federale sulla sistemazione dei corsi d’acqua
SR 721.80 – Water Power Act	1916	1918	Regulates water power installations (e.g., dam, retention basin, canals)	72 Public works – Energy – Transport – Public works	Wasserrechtsgesetz, WRG	Loi sur les forces hydrauliques, LFH	Legge sulle forze idriche, LUFI
SR 725.11 – Federal Act on National Roads	1960	1960	Regulates the construction and maintenance of national roads	72 Public works – Energy – Transport – Public works	Bundesgesetz über die Nationalstrassen, NSG	Loi fédérale sur les routes nationales, LRN	Legge federale sulle strade nazionali, LSN
SR 725.116.2 – Federal Act on the use of compulsorily allocated mineral oil tax and other funds for road and air traffic	1985	1985	Regulates the use of various government taxes and revenues for spend related to road and air traffic	72 Public works – Energy – Transport – Public works	Bundesgesetz über die Verwendung der zweckgebundenen Mineralölsteuer und weiterer für den Strassen- und Luftverkehr zweckgebundener Mittel, MinVG	Loi fédérale concernant l’use de l’impôt sur les huiles minérales à affectation obligatoire et des autres moyens affectés à la circulation routière et au trafic aérien, LUMin	Legge federale concernente l’utilizzazione dell’imposta sugli oli minerali a destinazione vincolata e di altri mezzi a destinazione vincolata per il traffico stradale e aereo, LUMin
SR 725.13 – Federal Act on the fund for national roads and for agglomeration traffic	2016	2018	Regulates the fund for national roads and agglomeration traffic, which recipient from the income sources defined in SR 725.116.2	72 Public works – Energy – Transport – Public works	Bundesgesetz über den Fonds für die Nationalstrassen und den Agglomerationsverkehr, NAFG	Loi fédérale sur le fonds pour les routes nationales et pour le trafic d’agglomération, LFORTA	Legge federale concernente il Fondo per le strade nazionali e il traffico d’agglomerato, LFOSTRA
SR 818.101 – Epidemics Act	2012	2016	Governs epidemics				
SR 952.0 – Swiss Banking Act	1934	1935	Governs banking in Switzerland	95 Credit	Bankengesetz, BankG	Loi sur les banques, LB	Legge sulle banche, LBCR

== Previous legislation ==
Name	Decision	Repealed	Replaced by	German	French	Italian
SR 121 – Federal Act on Civilian Intelligence	2008	2015	SR 121 – Intelligence Service Act (IntelSA)	Bundesgesetz über die Zuständigkeiten im Bereichdes zivilen Nachrichtendienstes, ZNDG	Loi fédérale sur le renseignement civil, LFRC	Legge federale sul servizio informazioni civile, LSIC
SR 142.20 – Federal Act on the Residence and Settlement of Foreigners	1931	2005	SR 142.20 – Federal Act on Foreign Nationals and Integration (FNIA)	Bundesgesetz über Aufenthalt und Niederlassung der Ausländer (ANAG)	Loi fédérale sur le séjour et l'établissement des étrangers (LSEE)	Legge federale concernente la dimora e il domicilio degli stranieri (LDDS)
SR 142.31 – Asylum Act	1979	1998	SR 142.31 – Asylum Act (AsylA)	Asylgesetz	Loi sur l'asile	Legge sull'asilo
SR 170.512 – Publications Act	1986	2004	SR 170.512 – Publications Act (PublA)	Publikationsgesetz	Loi sur les publications officielles	Legge sulle pubblicazioni ufficiali
SR 171.10 – Parliamentary Procedures Act	1962	2002	SR 171.10 – Parliament Act (ParlA)	Geschäftsverkehrsgesetz, GVG	Loi sur les rapports entre les conseils, LREC	Legge sui rapporti fra i Consigli, LRC
SR 172.056.1 – Public Procurement Act	1994	2019	SR 172.056.1 – Public Procurement Act (PPA)	Bundesgesetz über das öffentliche Beschaffungswesen (BöB)	Loi fédérale sur les marchés publics (LMP)	Legge federale sugli acquisti pubblici (LAPub)
SR 172.010 – Administration Organisation Act	1979	1997	SR 172.010 – Government and Administration Organisation Act (GAOA)	Verwaltungsorganisationsgesetz, VwOG	Loi sur l'organisation de l'administration, LOA	Legge sull'organizzazione dell'ammininistrazione, LOA
SR 172.010 – Federal Act on the Organization of the Federal Administration	1914	1979	SR 172.010 – Administration Organisation Act	Bundesgesetz über die Organisation der Bundesverwaltung	Loi fédérale sur l'organisation de l'administration fédérale	Legge federale sull'organizzazione dell'Amministrazione federale
SR 196.1 – Restitution of Illicit Assets Act	2010	2015	SR 196.1 – Foreign Illicit Assets Act (FIAA)	Bundesgesetz über die Rückerstattung unrechtmässig erworbener Vermögenswerte politisch exponierter Personen (RuVG)	Loi sur la restitution des avoirs illicites, LRAI	Legge sulla restituzione degli averi di provenienza illecita, LRAI
SR 141.0 – Federal Act on the Acquisition and Loss of Swiss Citizenship	1952	2014	SR 141.0 – Swiss Citizenship Act (SCA)	Bürgerrechtsgesetz, BüG	Loi sur la nationalité, LN	Legge sulla cittadinanza, LCit
SR 171.21 – Compensation Act	1972	1988	SR 171.21 – Resources Allocated to Parliamentarians Act	Taggeldergesetz	Loi sur les indemnités	Legge federale sulle indennità parlamentari
SR 171.21 – Federal Act on the Allowances Due to Members of the National Council and Legislative Council Committees	1968	1972	SR 171.21 – Compensation Act	Bundesgesetz über die Vergütungen an die Mitglieder des Nationalrates und der Kommissionen der eidgenössischen Räte	Loi fédérale sur les indemnités dues aux membres du Conseil national et des commissions des conseils législatifs	Legge federale sulle indennità ai membri del Consiglio nazionale e delle commissioni delle Camere federali
SR 173.110 – Judicial organization	1943	2005	SR 173.110 – Federal Supreme Court Act	Bundesrechtspflegegesetz, OG	Organisation judiciaire, OJ	Organizzazione giudiziaria, OG
SR 173.71 – Criminal Court Act	2002	2010	SR 173.71 – Criminal Authorities Organization Act	Strafgerichtsgesetz, SGG	Loi fédérale sur le Tribunal pénal fédéral, LTPF	Legge sul Tribunale penale federale, LTPF
SR 194.2 – Federal Act on the Promotion of the Conditions for the Establishment of Businesses in Switzerland	2005	2007	SR 194.2 – Federal Act on the Promotion of the Conditions for the Establishment of Businesses in Switzerland	Bundesgesetz zur Förderung der Information über den Unternehmensstandort Schweiz	Loi fédérale concernant la promotion des conditions d’implantation des entreprises en Suisse	Legge federale che promuove l’informazione riguardante la piazza imprenditoriale svizzera
SR 194.1 – Federal Act establishing a coordination commission for Switzerland's presence abroad	1976	2000	SR 194.1 – Federal Act on the Promotion of the Image of Switzerland Abroad	Bundesgesetz über die Einsetzung einer Koordinationskommission für die Präsenz der Schweiz im Ausland	Loi fédérale instituant une commission de coordination pour la présence de la Suisse à l'étranger	Legge federale che istituisce una commissione di coordinamento per la presenza della Svizzera all'estero
SR 193.9 – Federal Act on the participation and the granting of financial aid by the Confederation to the Henry Dunant Centre for Humanitarian Dialogue	2000	2003	SR 193.9 – Federal Act on Civil Peace Promotion Measures and Human Rights Strengthening	Bundesgesetz über die Teilnahme und die Finanzhilfe des Bundes an das Henry-Dunant-Zentrum für den humanitären Dialog	Loi fédérale concernant la participation et l'octroi d'une aide financière de la Confédération au Centre Henry-Dunant pour le Dialogue humanitaire	Legge federale sulla partecipazione e la concessione di aiuti finanziari della Confederazione al Centro Henry Dunant per il Dialogo umanitario
SR 211.412.11 – Federal Act on Rural Land Ownership Maintenance	1951	1991	SR 211.412.11 – Federal Act on Rural Land Law	Bundesgesetz über die Erhaltung des bäuerlichen Grundbesitzes	Loi fédérale sur le maintien de la propriété foncière rurale	Legge federale sulla conservazione della proprietà fondiaria agricola
SR 221.214.1 – Federal Act on Consumer Credit	1993	2001	SR 221.214.1 – Federal Law on Consumer Credit	Bundesgesetz über den Konsumkredit, KKG	Loi fédérale sur le crédit à la consommation, LCC	Legge federale sul credito al consumo, LCC
SR 231.1 – Federal Act on Copyright in Literary and Artistic Works	1922	1992	SR 231.1 – Copyright Act, CopA and SR 231.2 -Topographies Act	Bundesgesetz betreffend das Urheberrecht an Werken der Literatur und Kunst	Loi fédérale concernant le droit d'auteur sur les oeuvres littéraires et artistiques	Legge federale concernente il diritto d'autore sulle opere letterarie ed artistiche
SR 231.2 – Federal Act concerning the collection of copyrights	1940	1992	SR 231.1 – Copyright Act, CopA and SR 231.2 -Topographies Act	Bundesgesetz betreffend die Verwertung von Urheberrechten	Loi fédérale concernant la perception de droits d'auteur	Legge federale concernente la riscossione dei diritti d'autore
SR 232.11 – Federal Act on the Protection of Trademarks, Indications of Source and Industrial Awards	1891	1992	SR 232.11 – Trade Mark Protection Act, TmPA	Bundesgesetz betreffend den Schutz der Fabrik- und Handelsmarken, der Herkunftsbezeichnungen von Waren und der gewerblichen Auszeichnungen	Loi fédérale concernant la protection des marques de fabrique et de commerce, des indications de provenance et des mentions de récompenses industrielles	Legge federale sulla protezione delle marche di fabbrica e di commercio, delle indicazioni di provenienza di merci e delle distinzioni industriali
SR 232.12 – Federal Act on Industrial Designs	1900	2001	SR 232.12 – Designs Act, DesA	Bundesgesetz betreffend die gewerblichen Muster und Modelle	Loi fédérale sur les dessins et modèles industriels	Legge federale sui disegni e modelli industriali
SR 232.21 – Federal Act for the protection of public coats of arms and other public signs	1931	2013	SR 232.21 – Coat of Arms Protection Act, CAPA	Bundesgesetz zum Schutz öffentlicher Wappen und anderer öffentlicher Zeichen	Loi fédérale pour la protection des armoiries publiques et autres signes publics	Legge federale per la protezione degli stemmi pubblici e di altri segni pubblici
SR 235.2 – Federal Act on the processing of personal data by the Federal Department of Foreign Affairs	2000	2020	SR 235.2 – Federal Act on the processing of personal data by the Federal Department of Foreign Affairs	Bundesgesetz über die Bearbeitung von Personendaten im Eidgenössischen Departement für auswärtige Angelegenheiten	Loi fédérale sur le traitement des données personnelles au Département fédéral des affaires étrangères	Legge federale sul trattamento di dati personali in seno al Dipartimento federale degli affari esteri
SR 241 – Unfair Competition Act, UCA	1943	1986	SR 241 – Unfair Competition Act, UCA	Bundesgesetz über den unlauteren Wettbewerb	Loi fédérale sur la concurrence déloyale	Legge federale sulla concorrenza sleale
SR 251 – Cartel Act, CartA	1985	1995	SR 251 – Cartel Act, CartA	Kartellgesetz, KG	Loi sur les cartels, LCart	Legge sui cartelli, LCart
SR 251 – Federal Act on Cartels and Similar Organizations	1962	1985	SR 251 – Cartel Act, CartA	Bundesgesetz über Kartelle und ähnliche Organisationen	Loi fédérale sur les cartels et organisations analogues	Legge federale sui cartelli e le organizzazioni analoghe
SR 312.5 – Victims' Assistance Act	1991	2007	SR 312.5 – Victims' Assistance Act	Opferhilfegesetz, OHG	Loi sur l’aide aux victimes, LAVI	Legge federale concernente l’aiuto alle vittime di reati, LAV
SR 411.3 – Federal Act on contributions to the Cantonal School of the French Language in Bern	1981	2022	SR 411.3 – Federal Act on contributions to the Cantonal School of the French Language in Bern	Bundesgesetz über die Beiträge an die kantonale Schule französischer Sprache in Bern	Loi fédérale sur les contributions à l’École cantonale de langue française de Berne	Legge federale sui contributi alla Scuola cantonale di lingua francese di Berna
SR 412.10 – Vocational and Professional Education and Training Act, VPETA	1978	2002	SR 412.10 – Vocational and Professional Education and Training Act, VPETA	Berufsbildungsgesetz, BBG	Loi fédérale sur la formation professionnelle, LFPr	Legge sulla formazione professionale, LFPr
SR 412.10 – Vocational and Professional Education and Training Act, VPETA	1963	1978	SR 412.10 – Vocational and Professional Education and Training Act, VPETA	Berufsbildungsgesetz, BBG	Loi fédérale sur la formation professionnelle, LFPr	Legge sulla formazione professionale, LFPr
SR 418.0 – Education of Swiss abroad Act	1987	2014	SR 418.0 – Swiss schools abroad Act	Auslandschweizer-Ausbildungsgesetz, AAG	Loi sur l'instruction des Suisses de l'étranger, LISE	Legge federale concernente il promovimento del l'istruzione dei giovani Svizzeri all'estero, LISE
SR 510.10 – Federal Act on the military organization of the Swiss Confederation	1907	1995	SR 510.10 – Army Act	Bundesgesetz über die Militärorganisation	Loi fédérale concernant l'organisation militaire de la Confédération suisse	Legge federale concernente l'organizzazione militare della Confederazione Svizzera
SR 514.51 – Federal Act on War Material	1972	1996	SR 514.51 – War Mat Act, WMA	Bundesgesetz über das Kriegsmaterial	Loi fédérale sur le matériel de guerre	Legge federale sul materiale bellico
SR 520.1 – Federal Act on the protection of the population and civil protection	2002	2019	SR 520.1 – Federal Act on the protection of the population and civil protection	Bevölkerungs- und Zivilschutzgesetz, BZG	Loi fédérale sur la protection de la population et sur la protection civile, LPPCi	Legge federale sulla protezione della popolazione e sulla protezione civile, LPPC
SR 520.1 – Civil Protection Act	1994	2002	SR 520.1 – Federal Act on the protection of the population and civil protection	Zivilschutzgesetz, ZSG	Loi sur la protection civile, LPCi	Legge federale sulla protezione civile, LPCi
SR 520.1 – Civil Protection Act	1962	1994	SR 520.1 – Civil Protection Act	Zivilschutzgesetz, ZSG	Loi sur la protection civile, LPCi	Legge federale sulla protezione civile, LPCi
SR 520.3 – Federal Act on the Protection of Cultural Property in the Event of Armed Conflict	1966	1968	SR 520.3 – Federal Act on the Protection of Cultural Property in the Event of Armed Conflict, Disaster or Emergency	Bundesgesetz über den Schutz der Kulturgüter bei bewaffneten Konflikten	Loi fédérale sur la protection des biens culturels en cas de conflit armé	Legge federale per la protezione dei beni culturali in caso di conflitto armato
SR 531 – National Economic Supply Act, NESA	1982	2016	SR 531 – National Economic Supply Act, NESA	Landesversorgungsgesetz, LVG	Loi sur l'approvisionnement du pays, LAP	Legge sull'approvvigionamento del Paese, LAP
SR 611.0 – Federal Budget Act	1989	2005	SR 611.0 – Federal Budget Act	Finanzhaushaltgesetz, FHG	Loi fédérale sur les finances de la Confédération, LFC	Legge federale sulle finanze della Confederazione (LFC
SR 611.0 – Federal Budget Act	1968	1989	SR 611.0 – Federal Budget Act	Bundesgesetz über den eidgenössischen Finanzhaushalt	Loi fédérale sur les finances de la Confédération, LFC	Legge federale concernente la gestione finanziaria della Confederazione
631.0 – Customs Act	1925	2007	631.0 – Customs Act	Zollgesetz, ZG	Loi fédérale sur les douanes, LD	Legge federale sulle dogane, LD
632.10 – Federal Law on the Swiss Customs Tariff (with Tariff of Use)	1959	1988	632.10 – Customs Tariff Act, CTA	Bundesgesetz über den schweizerischen Zolltarif (Zolltarifgesetz) (mit Gebrauchs-Zolltarif)	Loi fédérale sur le tarif des douanes suisses (avec Tarif d'usage)	Legge federale su la tariffa delle dogane svizzere (con Tariffa d'uso)
SR 641.20 – Value Added Tax Act	1999	2010	SR 641.20 – Value Added Tax Act, VAT Act	Mehrwertsteuergesetz, MWSTG	Loi sur la TVA, LTVA	Legge sull'IVA, LIVA
SR 641.71 – CO2 Act	1999	2013	SR 641.71 – CO2 Act	CO2-Gesetz	Loi sur le CO2	Legge sul CO2
SR 672.2 – Federal Act on the execution of international agreements concluded by the Confederation for the avoidance of double taxation	1951	2022	SR 672.2 – Federal Act on the Execution of International Tax Conventions	Bundesgesetz über die Durchführung von zwischenstaatlichen Abkommen des Bundes zur Vermeidung der Doppelbesteuerung	Loi fédérale concernant l’exécution des conventions internationales conclues par la Confédération en vue d’éviter les doubles impositions	Legge federale concernente l’esecuzione delle convenzioni internazionali concluse dalla Confederazione per evitare i casi di doppia imposizione
SR 725.13 – Infrastructure Fund Act	2006	2018	SR 725.13 – Federal Act on the fund for national roads and for agglomeration traffic	Infrastrukturfondsgesetz, IFG	Loi sur le fonds d'infrastructure, LFInfr	Legge sul fondo infrastrutturale, LFIT
