= Foreign Illicit Assets Act =

Swiss law about asset seizure

Foreign Illicit Assets Act (FIAA)
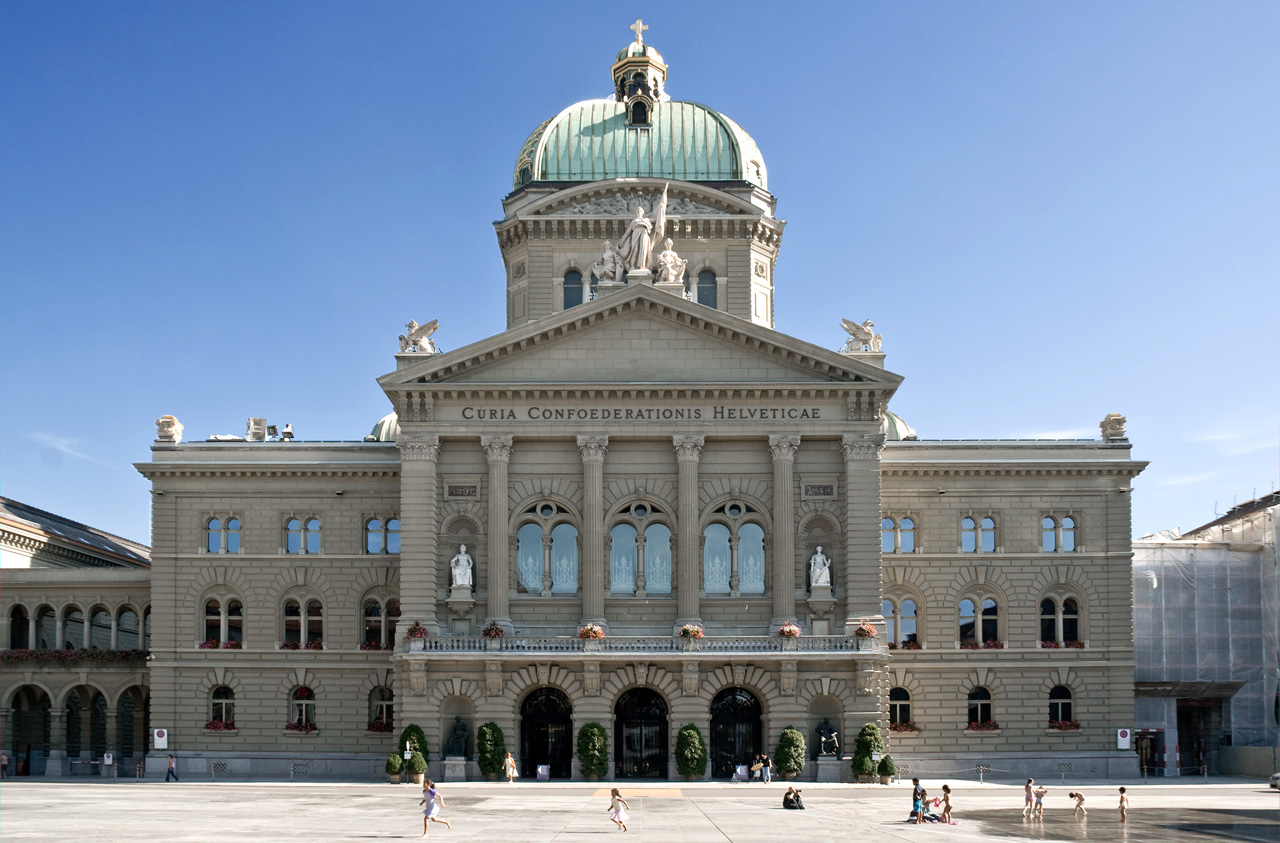

Federal Assembly of Switzerland
- Long title: Federal Act on the Freezing and the Restitution of Illicit Assets held by Foreign Politically Exposed Persons (SR 196.1)
- Territorial extent: Switzerland
- Enacted by: Federal Assembly of Switzerland
- Enacted: 18 December 2015
- Commenced: 1 July 2016

Repeals
- Restitution of Illicit Assets Act (2010)
- Status: Current legislation

The Foreign Illicit Assets Act (FIAA) (Note: German: Bundesgesetz über die Sperrung und die Rückerstattung unrechtmässig erworbener Vermögenswerte ausländischer politisch exponierter Personen (SRVG); French: Loi sur les valeurs patrimoniales d’origine illicite, LVP; Italian: Legge sui valori patrimoniali di provenienza illecita, LVP) is a Swiss federal law that provides for the freezing, confiscation and restitution of assets of foreign politically exposed persons (e.g., heads of state, senior politicians, close associates) that have been acquired through corruption or other criminal means, and which have been deposited in Swiss banks.

It was adopted on 18 December 2015 by the Federal Assembly and came into force on 1 July 2016. It replaces the Restitution of Illicit Assets Act (Note: German: Bundesgesetz über die Rückerstattung unrechtmässig erworbener Vermögenswerte politisch exponierter Personen, RuVG; French: Loi sur la restitution des avoirs illicites, LRAI; Italian: Legge sulla restituzione degli averi di provenienza illecita, LRAI) from 2010.

Switzerland was first confronted with the issue of the return of illicit assets in 1986, during the fall of the Philippine dictator Ferdinand Marcos, where it froze US$685 million of assets and restituted them to the Philippines. However, until the law of 2010, these measures were taken on an ad hoc basis by relying on the provisions of the Swiss constitution, lacking a formal legal basis.

The FIAA is administered by the Federal Department of Foreign Affairs.

== Key provisions ==
=== Conditions for freezing and confiscation ===
Under the law, assets can only be frozen if the following four conditions are met (art 3. para. 2):

1. the government of the country of origin has lost power or is about to lose power;
2. the level of corruption in the country of origin is notoriously high;
3. the assets were likely acquired through corruption, criminal mismanagement or other felonies;
4. the safeguarding of Switzerland's interests requires the freezing of the assets.

Assets can also be frozen for purpose of confiscation if three conditions are met (art. 4 para. 2):

1. the assets are subject to a provisional seizure order in criminal matters initiated at the request of the country of origin
2. the country of origin is unable to meet the requirements for mutual legal assistance due to the failure of state structures
3. the safeguarding of Switzerland's interests requires the freezing of the assets.

Assets can be frozen for a maximum of 10 years (art. 6).

=== Restitution ===
The assets can be restituted to the country of origin for the purposes of improving the living conditions of the inhabitants, or to strengthen the rule of law in the country of origin therefore contribute to the fight against impunity (art. 17).
