= National Council (Switzerland) =

House of the Federal Assembly of Switzerland

(in official languages)
German	Nationalrat
French	Conseil national
Italian	Consiglio nazionale
Romansh	Cussegl naziunal
- 52nd National Council

Type
- Type: House of the Swiss Federal Assembly

Leadership
- President: Pierre-André Page, SVP/UDC since 1 December 2025
- First Vice President: Katja Christ, GLP/VLP since 1 December 2025
- Second Vice President: Farah Rumy, SP/PS since 1 December 2025

Structure
- Seats: 200
- Political groups: SVP/UDC (62) SP/PS (41) The Centre (29) FDP/PLR (28) GPS/PES (23) GLP/PVL (10) MCG (2) EVP/PEV (2) EDU/UDF (2) Ticino League (1)
- Length of term: 4 years

Elections
- Voting system: Party-list proportional representation (Hagenbach-Bischoff system)
- First election: 1–27 October 1848
- Last election: 22 October 2023
- Next election: October 2027

Meeting place
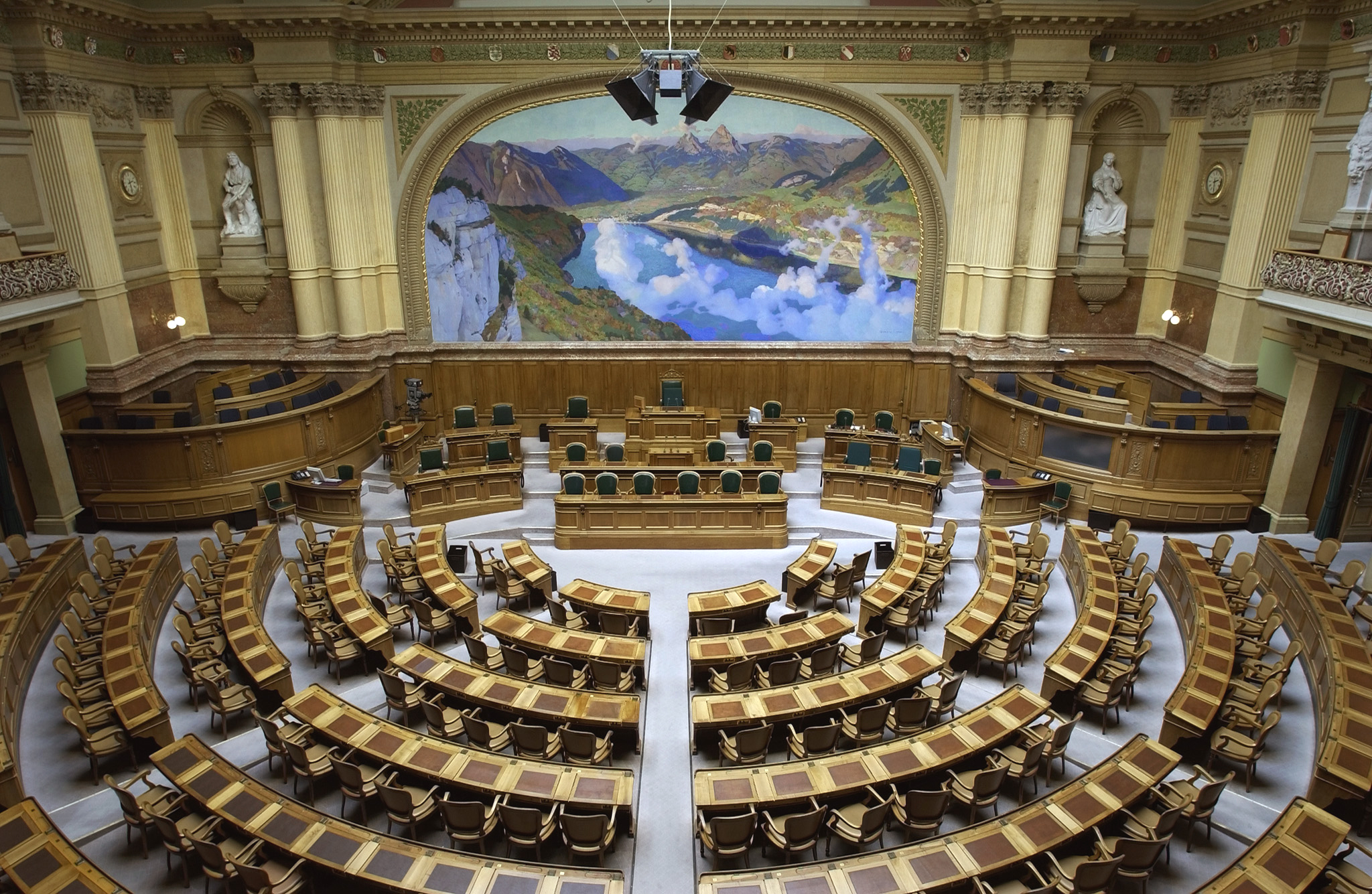
- Federal Palace, Bern

Website
- www.parlament.ch/en/organe/national-council

The National Council (German: Nationalrat; French: Conseil national; Italian: Consiglio nazionale; Romansh: Cussegl naziunal) is a house of the Federal Assembly of Switzerland, representing the people. The other house, the Council of States, represents the states. As the powers of the houses are the same, it is sometimes called perfect bicameralism. Both houses meet in the Federal Palace of Switzerland in Bern.

The National Council consists of 200 members. Adult citizens elect the council's members, who are called national Councillors, for four year terms. Members are apportioned to the cantons in proportion to their population.

== Organisation ==
With 200 members, the National Council is the larger house of the Federal Assembly. It represents the people, the vote of each citizen having more or less the same weight, whereas the Council of States represents the cantons - each of them having the same weight, regardless of its population.

When the Swiss Confederation was founded in 1848, the number of seats was not yet fixed, and was thus determined by the population of the individual cantons. According to the provisions of the federal constitution at that time, a canton was to receive one National Council member for every 20,000 citizens. Thus, the first National Council, which met in 1848, had 111 members.

In 1963, the number of members was fixed at 200. The division of the seats between the individual cantons is determined by each canton's percentage of the national population, as revealed in the national census (including foreign residents), using the largest remainder method. A change in the division of the seats occurred in 2003, as a result of the 2000 census.

Every canton is entitled to at least one seat in the National Council.

Unlike the Council of States where no translation is provided, simultaneous translation is provided into German, French, and Italian, but not Romansh.

== Electoral system ==
Under the Swiss Federal Constitution, elections for the National Council are held every four years by the Swiss people. The most recent election took place on Sunday, 22 October 2023.

Since a popular initiative in 1918, elections have been by proportional representation, in which each canton forms an electoral district (Wahlkreis). There is no election threshold. Since 1971 women have been entitled to vote and stand in National Council elections.

Since the reform of the census system and the adoption of the use of government administrative data for determining the population in 2007, the distribution of the seats in the National Council between the cantons has been based on the permanent resident population (including residents who are not entitled to vote) in the year following the most recent federal election. There is a proviso that each canton is entitled to at least one seat.

The number of seats given to the cantons which are entitled to more than one seat is determined using the largest remainder method. Cantons which are only entitled to send one councillor to the National Council elect the candidate who wins a majority of votes.

The cantons use a unique system of proportional representation, sometimes called a "free list". Each citizen may cast as many votes as there are seats available to their constituency, and may even cast up to two votes for the same candidate. For every vote received by a candidate, that candidate's party also receives a vote. Voters also list a party vote, in which all blank candidate votes contribute towards the party's total. In elections, political parties publish lists in the cantons with their candidates. Each list contains at most the number of candidates which the canton is entitled to send to the National Council. In addition, each party can produce multiple lists to the canton (e.g. men's, women's, youth, or seniors' lists; in larger cantons they might offer lists for individual cities or districts). It is also possible for several parties to enter a single shared list. Voters may choose a pre-prepared party list without making changes or they can alter it by cumulative voting or panachage. Thus, the voter can give his vote to a specific candidate and ignore the rest of that candidate's party. Alternatively, it is possible for the voter to split their vote among several candidates from different parties.

Election results for the National Council, 2019

The seats are then apportioned using the Hagenbach-Bischoff System. This system is unique in that it allows voters to split their vote across different parties, depending on which candidate the voter prefers.

=== Fictional voter ===
To determine a party's strength, the notion of "fictional voter" was introduced and is defined by the Swiss Federal Statistical Institute as: number of votes obtained by party A * (number of valid ballots / number of valid votes). Individual voters can choose to make fewer than the permissible number of votes. The number of valid votes / number of valid ballots closely matches the number of deputies a canton needs to elect. More exactly, this number represents the average number of valid votes per voter. The formula can then be summed up by: number of votes obtained by party A / average of valid votes per voters.

The result is the number of fictional voters for a given party in a given canton. A total number of fictional voters can then be established and the party strength can be deduced.

The number of deputies in each party is determined at the cantonal level using proportional representation with the Hagenbach-Bischoff system (except in single-member cantons.) The election's turnout is computed as: number of valid ballots cast / number of registered voters.

== Role ==
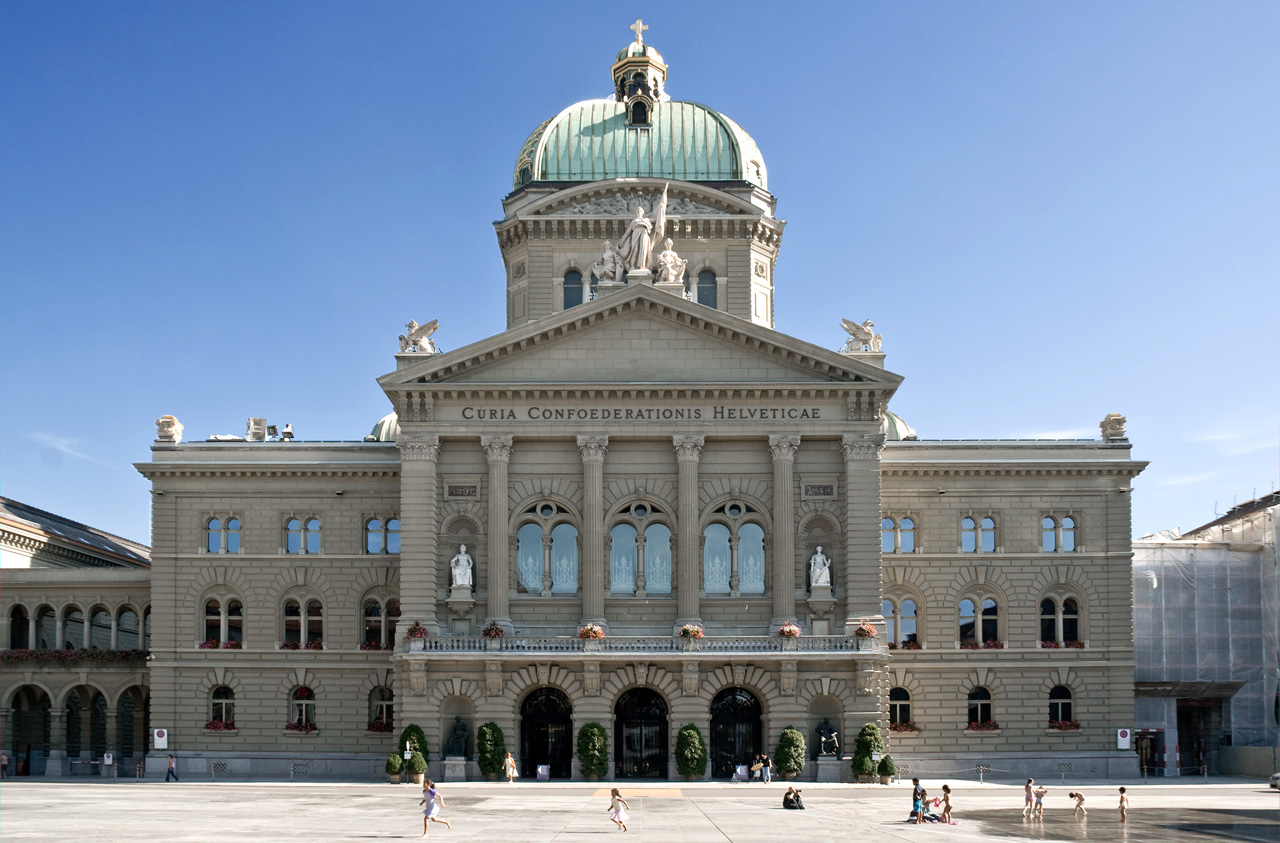
Federal Palace of Switzerland, Bern

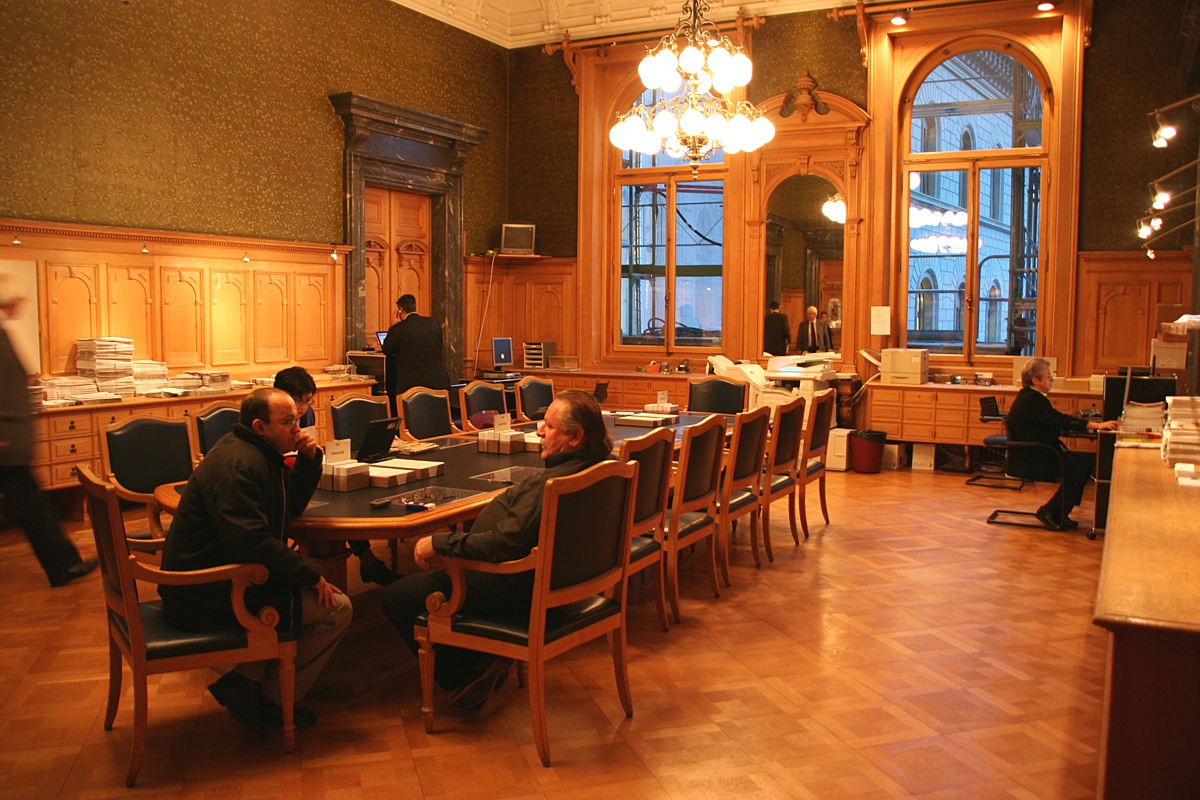
The antechamber of the National Council hall

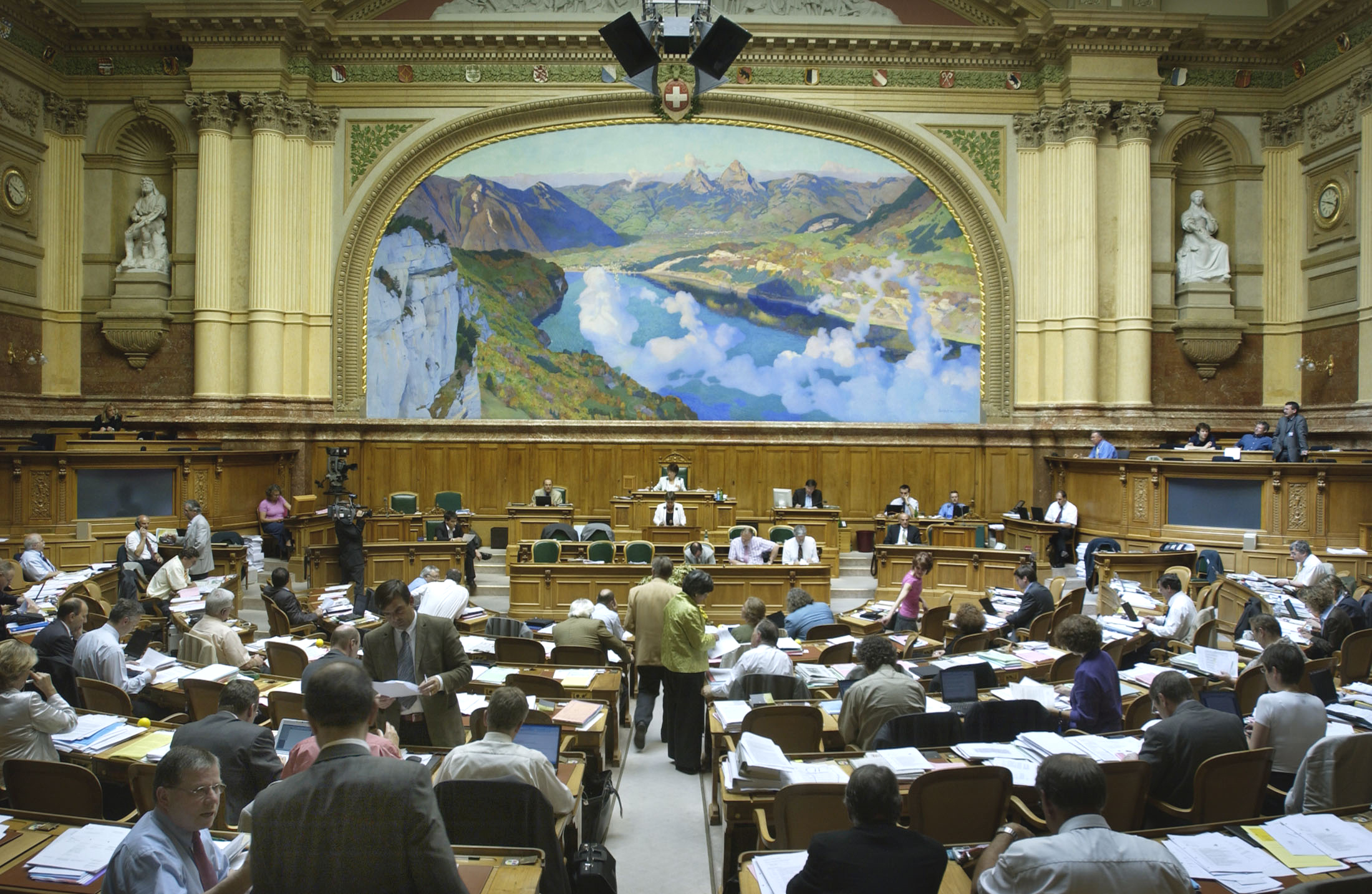
National Council hall during a session

The role and powers of the National Council are regulated by the Parliament Act (ParlA) and the Title 5 of the Swiss Federal Constitution. The National Council, together with the Council of States, forms the Federal Parliament and exercises the highest legal authority in Switzerland, subject to the rights of the people and the cantons. Both chambers of the Federal Parliament are called "councils" (Räte). The National Council and the Council of States do not meet daily, but meet regularly for sessions. Usually, there are four sessions in a year, each lasting three weeks, with between two and five sittings per week. The spring session (Frühjahrssession) begins on the first Monday in March, the summer session (Sommersession) on the first Monday in June, the Autumn session (Herbstsession) after the Federal Day, and the winter session (Wintersession) on the last Monday in November. During the sessions, proposed legislation is debated. If there is not enough time in the regular sessions, an extra session can be convened. In special situations (political crises, wars, etc.) a quarter of the members of one of the two councils or the Federal Council can convene an extraordinary session. To date, there have been eight extraordinary sessions, most of them called by the social democratic parliamentary group.

Extraordinary sessions of the National Council
Date	Reason/event
July 1891	Introduction of the federal currency monopoly
6–7 February 1985	Response to Forest dieback
9–11 October 1986	Energy policy after the Chernobyl disaster
22–23 January 1998	Tax loopholes and merger/economic policy (merger of UBS and SBV)
16 November 2001	Financing Swissair
3 October 2002	minimum interest rate ("employment pension")
1 October 2007	Tax issues
8 December 2008	2008 financial crisis
4–8 May 2020	COVID-19 pandemic

== Powers ==
The National Council and the Council of States are constitutionally completely equal - a bill is only law when it has been accepted by both councils in the same version. All business is considered by both councils in turn. The presidents of the councils decide together which council will handle a given matter first (Erstrat).

Sometimes, after the first reading, the National Council and the Council of States end up producing different texts, in which case a difference resolution procedure takes place, in which the bill is sent back and forth between the two councils. After a bill has been sent back three successive times, the two councils must meet together to discuss the matter.

Each year the National Council elects a President of the National Council, who leads sessions of the National Council and joint sessions of the National Council and the Council of States.

== Committees ==
- Foreign Affairs Committee (FAC)
- Committee for Science, Education and Culture (CSEC)
- Committee for Social Security and Health (CSSH)
- Committee for the Environment, Spatial Planning and Energy (CESPE)
- Defence Committee (DefC)
- Committee for Transportation and Telecommunications (CTT)
- Committee for Economic Affairs and Taxation (CEAT)
- Political Institutions Committees (PIC)
- Committee for Legal Affairs (CLA)
- Committee for Public Buildings (CPB)

=== Supervisory committees ===
- Finance Committee (FC)
- Control Committees (CC)
- Parliamentary investigation committees (PIC)

=== Other committees ===
- Committee on Pardons
- Rehabilitation Committee
- Drafting Committee
- Judicial Committee

== Members per canton ==
Development of composition of the Swiss National Council, 1919–2023

Abbr.	Canton	Number of seats	Population (2024)	Population per seat	Voting power (Note: Under Switzerland's panachage system, each voter has as many votes as there are seats in the canton.)
ZH	Zurich	36	1,620,020	45,001	58,320,720
BE	Bern	23	1,071,216	46,575	24,637,968
LU	Luzern	10	437,944	43,794	4,379,440
UR	Uri	1	38,275	38,275	38,275
SZ	Schwyz	4	168,931	42,233	675,724
OW	Obwalden	1	39,662	39,662	39,662
NW	Nidwalden	1	45,345	45,345	45,345
GL	Glarus	1	42,371	42,371	42,371
ZG	Zug	3	133,739	44,580	401,217
FR	Fribourg	8	346,674	43,334	2,773,392
SO	Solothurn	6	289,792	48,299	1,738,752
BS	Basel-Stadt	4	201,384	50,346	805,536
BL	Basel-Landschaft	7	301,323	43,046	2,109,261
SH	Schaffhausen	2	88,667	44,334	177,334
AR	Appenzell Ausserrhoden	1	56,705	56,705	56,705
AI	Appenzell Innerrhoden	1	16,733	16,733	16,733
SG	St. Gallen	12	540,036	45,003	6,480,432
GR	Grisons	4	206,138	51,535	824,552
AG	Aargau	16	735,808	45,988	11,772,928
TG	Thurgau	6	299,509	49,918	1,797,054
TI	Ticino	8	358,903	44,863	2,871,224
VD	Vaud	19	855,106	45,006	16,247,014
VS	Valais	8	371,288	46,411	2,970,304
NE	Neuchâtel	4	179,518	44,880	718,072
GE	Geneva	12	531,102	44,259	6,373,224
JU	Jura	2	74,840	37,420	149,680
Overall		200	9,051,029	45,255	146,462,919

== See also ==
- Parliament Act (Switzerland)
- Political Rights Act (Switzerland)
- List of presidents of the National Council of Switzerland
- List of members of the National Council of Switzerland (2023–2027)
- List of members of the National Council of Switzerland, 2019–23
- List of members of the National Council of Switzerland, 2011–15
- List of members of the National Council of Switzerland, 2007–11
- List of members of the National Council of Switzerland, 2003–07
- Political Institutions Committee

== Bibliography ==
- Federal Chancellor Corina Casanova, ed. (28 April 2015), The Swiss Confederation – A Brief Guide 2015, Bern, Switzerland: Swiss Federal Chancellery (FCh) of the Swiss Confederation, archived from the original (PDF) on 21 January 2016
