= Public Procurement Act (Switzerland) =

Law governing the awarding of public contracts by Swiss federal authorities

Public Procurement Act (PPA)

Federal Assembly of Switzerland
- Long title: Federal Act on Public Procurement (SR 172.056.1)
- Territorial extent: Switzerland
- Enacted by: Federal Assembly of Switzerland
- Enacted: 21 June 2019
- Commenced: 1 January 2021

Repeals
- Public Procurement Act (1994)
- Status: Current legislation

The Public Procurement Act (PPA) (Note: German: Bundesgesetz über das öffentliche Beschaffungswesen, BöB; French: Loi fédérale sur les marchés publics, LMP; Italian: Legge federale sugli appalti pubblici, LAPub) is a Swiss federal law that governs the awarding of public contracts by Swiss federal authorities, representing a total market of 80-100 billion CHF per year. It transposes the WTO's Agreement on Government Procurement (GPA) into Swiss law. It was adopted on 21 June 2019 by the Federal Assembly and came into force on 1 January 2021. It is a complete revision of the previous law of 1994.

This act does not apply to cantonal authorities, which have their own regulation on the topic. However, the 2019 revision was also accompanied by a total revision of Intercantonal Agreement on Public Procurement, (Note: German: Interkantonale Vereinbarung über das öffentliche Beschaffungswesen, IVöB; French: Accord intercantonal sur les marchés publics, AIMP) which provides a common framework for the Public Procurement at the cantonal level. Together, these changes brought substantial harmonization of federal and cantonal law.

The PPA is implemented by the Public Procurement Ordinance (PPO) (Note: German: Verordnung über das öffentliche Beschaffungswesen, VöB; French: Ordonnance sur les marchés publics, OMP; Italian: Ordinanza sugli appalti pubblici, OAPub) of 2020, which came into effect at the same time as the law.

== See also ==
- Agreement on Government Procurement
