= Federal Consumer Credit Act (Switzerland) =

Swiss federal law

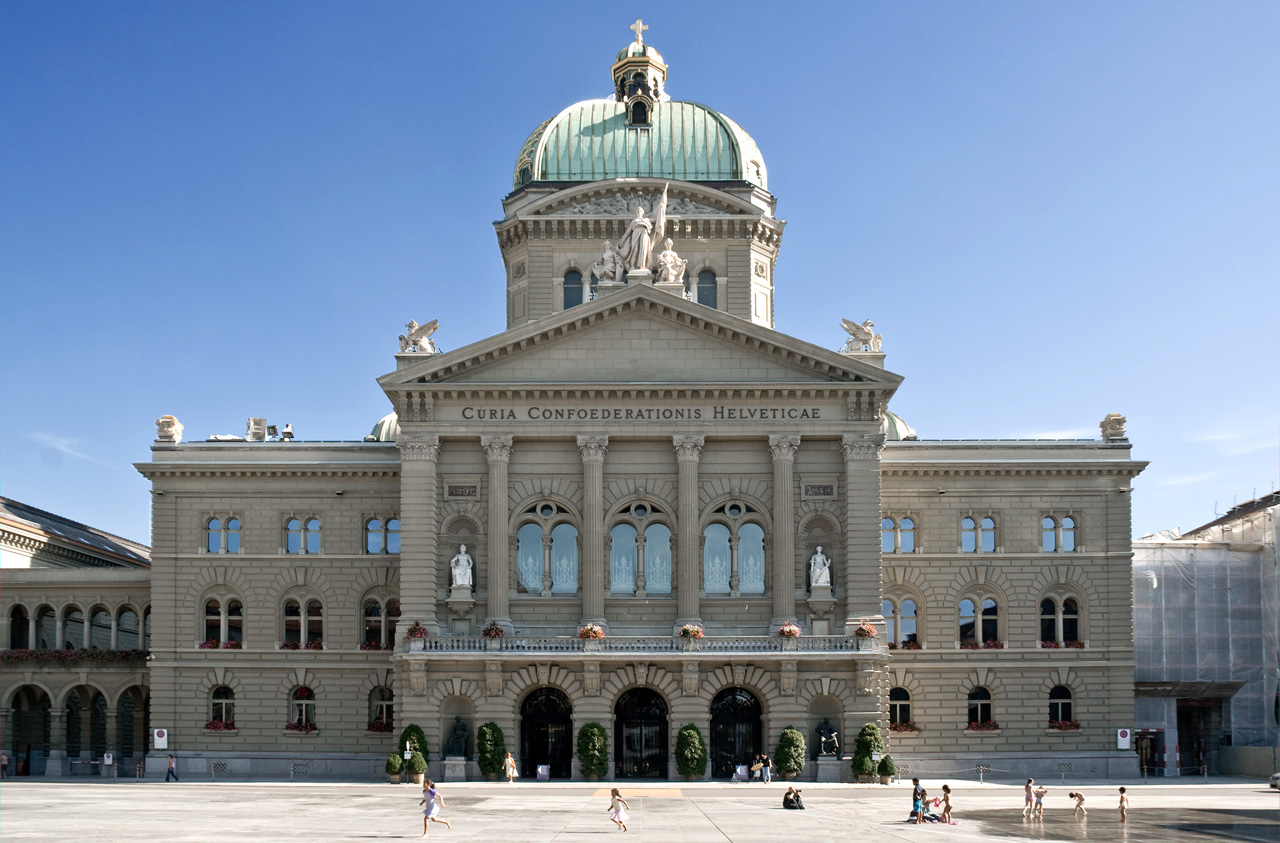

Federal Assembly of Switzerland
- Long title: SR 221.214.1
- Territorial extent: Switzerland
- Enacted by: Federal Assembly of Switzerland
- Enacted: 23 March 2001
- Commenced: 1 January 2003

Repeals
- Federal Consumer Credit Act (1993)
- Status: Current legislation

The Federal Consumer Credit Act (Note: German: Bundesgesetz über den Konsumkredit, KKG; French: Loi fédérale sur le crédit à la consommation, LCC; Italian: Legge federale sul credito al consumo, LCC) is a Swiss federal law that aims to increase the protection of borrowers against overindebtedness. The law covers consumer credits and leasing contracts to natural persons without professional or commercial intention, credit and loyalty cards as well as bank overdrafts.

It was adopted on 23 March 2001 by the Federal Assembly and came into force on 1 January 2003, replacing the previous law from 1993.

The Ordinance on the Federal Consumer Credit Act (SR 221.214.11), (Note: German: Verordnung zum Konsumkreditgesetz, VKKG; French: Ordonnance relative à la loi fédérale sur le crédit à la consommation, OLCC; Italian: Ordinanza concernente la legge sul credito al consumo, OLCC) issued by the Federal Council, regulates a number of special implementing provisions, including the maximum annual interest rate of 10% above the SARON 3-month rate.

== Types of loans ==
The law applies to the following types of credit (payment contracts):

- Bank overdrafts on current accounts
- Account overdrafts, which the bank implicitly accepts
- Credit cards and loyalty cards with credit options
- Loans (especially financing loans), payment periods and similar financial assistance
- certain leasing contracts

== Exceptions ==
A bank overdraft is not subject to the act if it is (art. 7):

- directly or indirectly secured by real estate pledges
- covered by the deposit of a bank guarantee
- covered by sufficient assets deposited by the consumer with the creditor
- for an amount of less than CHF 500 or more than CHF 80 000
- of a duration where the consumer must repay the credit within three months

Furthermore, the law only applies if the borrower is a natural person and the credit is taken for private use.

== Content of the contract ==
The consumer credit agreement is subject to rather strict formal requirements (art. 9). It must in any case be in writing and contain the net amount and the APR, which are the total costs for the borrower and other possible expenses. The planned repayment period with the respective monthly installments must also be given. The contract must also contain a passage allowing the borrower to repay the full amount under interest reduction. The possibility of revocation must also be mentioned in the contract.

Additional requirements apply to the consumer credit agreement (art. 10) and the leasing agreement (art. 11). An immediate repayment for example is not possible at any time, but on the contrary, in case of termination of the contract, the borrower owes money to the lessor for this termination.

== Creditworthiness ==
The examination of the consumer's creditworthiness is mandatory (Art. 28). A consumer is considered solvent if the monthly payment does not exceed the seizable part of the income. In this case, a repayment in a maximum of 36 months is assumed. The maximum credit amount is determined by law, which is why the seizable portion of the income is multiplied by 36.

== Borrower's right of revocation ==
The borrower may revoke a bank overdraft in writing within 14 days of receiving the copy of the contract intended. The borrower has no right of revocation if he/she tacitly accepts bank overdrafts.

== Maximum interest rate ==
The maximum interest rate has been reduced from 15% to 10%. The new maximum interest rate of 10% above the SARON 3-month rate (SAR3MC) has been in force since 1 July 2016.

== Duty to report ==
The law stipulates that the lender must report the consumer credit or leasing agreement granted to the information centre (Art. 25). In the case of accounts linked to a credit card or a customer card with a credit option, the obligation to report only applies from an outstanding amount of CHF 3,000 (Art. 27).

== Credit brokering ==
A licence is required for commercial credit brokering in Switzerland (Art. 39). This is issued by the canton in which the credit broker has its headquarters. Credit brokers are prohibited from charging brokerage or processing fees.

== Unfair Competition Act ==
In addition to the Federal Consumer Credit Act, Articles 3k-n of the Unfair Competition Act also apply. In particular Article 3n, which prescribes that the granting of credit is prohibited if it leads to the consumer becoming over-indebted.
