= Parliament Act (Switzerland) =

Swiss law defining the rights, duties, and procedure of the Federal Assembly

Parliament Act (ParlA)
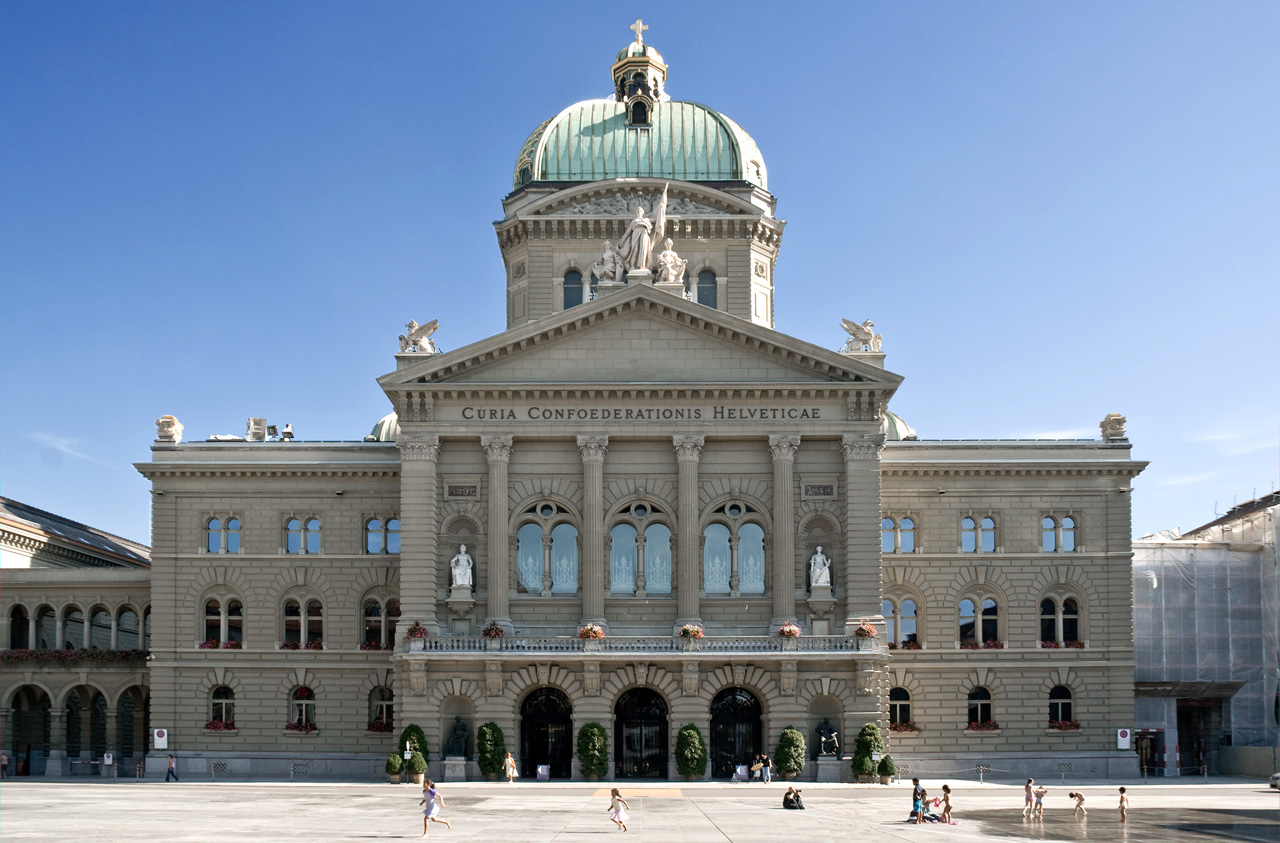

Federal Assembly of Switzerland
- Long title: Federal Act on the Federal Assembly (SR 171.10)
- Territorial extent: Switzerland
- Enacted by: Federal Assembly of Switzerland
- Enacted: 13 December 2002
- Commenced: 1 December 2003

Repeals
- Parliamentary Procedures Act (1962)
- Status: Current legislation

The Parliament Act (ParlA) (Note: German: Parlamentsgesetz, ParlG; French: Loi sur le Parlement, LParl; Italian: Legge sul Parlamento, LParl) is a Swiss federal law that clarifies the provisions of the Swiss constitution (Title 5, Chapter 2) on the rights, duties, tasks, organization and procedure of the Federal Assembly, as well as the division of power between the Federal Assembly, the Federal Council, and the Federal courts. It was adopted on 13 December 2002 by the Federal Assembly and came into force on 1 December 2003. It replaces the Parliamentary Procedures Act from 1962.

== History ==
- 1849: the first federal law governing the procedural relations between the two chambers of the Federal assembly (National Council and the Council of States).
- 1902: a total revision of the Act was passed. It introduced, among other things, the Finance Delegation.
- 1962: the Parliamentary Procedures Act (Note: German: Geschäftsverkehrsgesetz, GVG; French: loi sur les rapports entre les conseils, LREC; Italian: legge sui rapporti fra i Consigli, LRC) is introduced, another total revision of the law.
- 2002: a third total revision of the law is introduced with the Parliament Act (ParlA), which comes into force on 1 December 2003.

== See also ==
- Federal Assembly (Switzerland)
