= Civil servants in Switzerland =

Public servants in Switzerland

Federal Personnel Act (FPA)
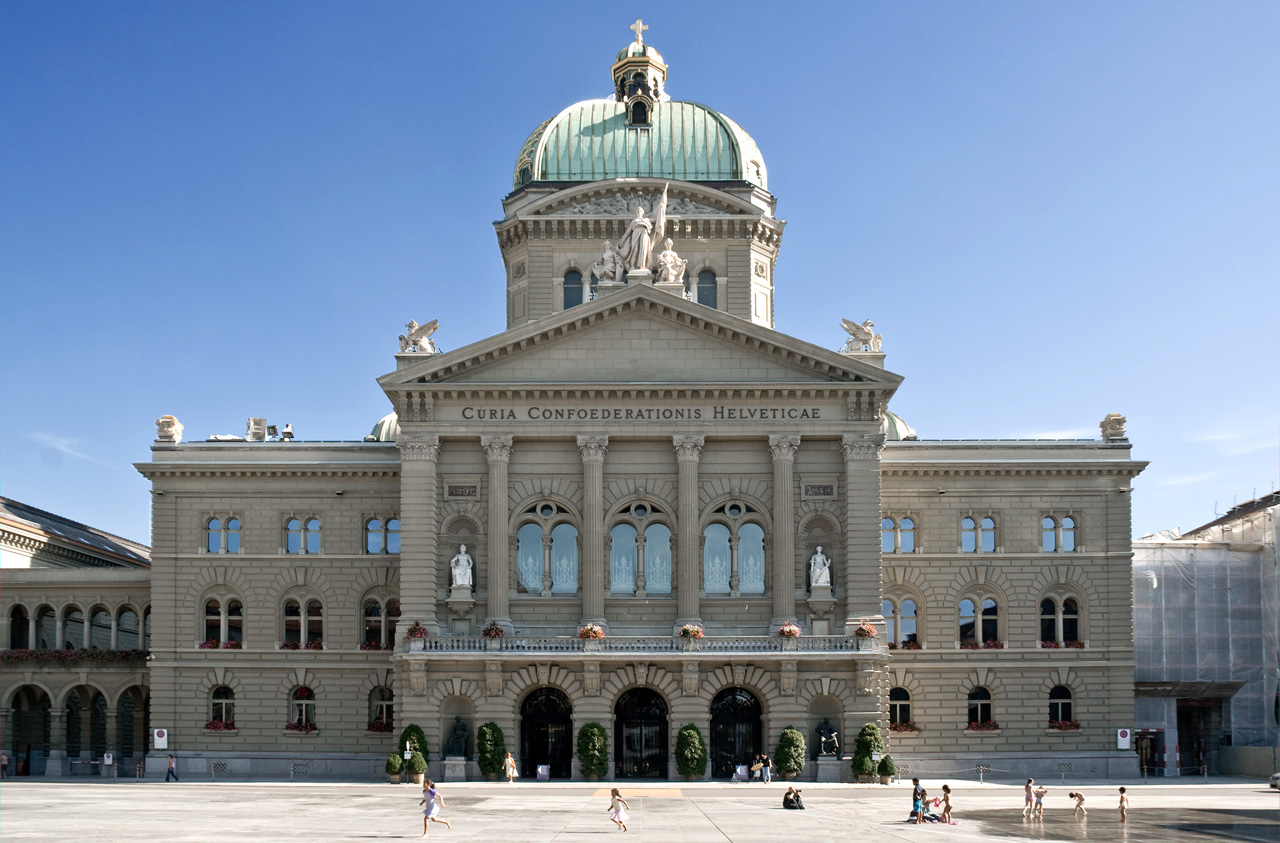

Federal Assembly of Switzerland
- Long title: Federal Personnel Act (SR 172.220.1)
- Territorial extent: Switzerland
- Enacted by: Federal Assembly of Switzerland
- Enacted: 24 March 2000
- Commenced: 1 January 2001
- Status: Current legislation

Civil servants in Switzerland are public sector employees who work for the Confederation, cantons, or communes. According to the OECD, approximately 595,000 people worked for a public administration in 2022, representing 11.2% of the active population. However, some estimates place the figure at 23% when including employees of semi-public entities such as the Post, the Federal Railways, university hospitals, and subsidized sectors. Using the OECD's standardized definition, Switzerland ranks in the lower third among OECD member countries.

Today, most Swiss public sector workers are employed under regular employment contracts with indefinite duration, similar to private sector employees, following major reforms in the late 20th and early 21st centuries. The Swiss public service is characterized by extreme fragmentation, with the Confederation, 26 cantons, and approximately 3,000 communes each maintaining their own personnel regulations.

Historically, Swiss civil servants belonged to a public administration that engaged them for fixed terms (period of function), with service relationships often renewed by tacit re-election. They had a particular duty of loyalty to the authority they served and were traditionally considered to benefit from greater job security than in the private economy. However, toward the end of the 20th century, most cantons gradually shifted to engaging personnel for an indefinite duration with appropriate notice periods. By 2000, the majority of cantons and numerous municipalities, including the major cities, had modified their laws and ordinances on personnel and transitioned from a traditional civil service system to an administration composed of regular employees. The Confederation followed this evolution with its Federal Personnel Act (FPA), (Note: German: Bundespersonalgesetz, BPG; French: Loi sur le personnel de la Confédération, LPers; Italian: Legge sul personale federale, LPers) which entered into force in 2002 (for SBB personnel in 2001).

== Evolution of civil service law ==
The first text relating to the law of civil servants enacted by the federal state of 1848 was the law of 9 December 1850 on the responsibility of federal authorities and civil servants. It attributed primary responsibility to the civil servant at fault in case of damages caused by an authority (and not to the State, as the law of 14 March 1958 would do). In 1853, "permanent federal functions" were inscribed for the first time in a law which, with subsequent decrees (until 1972), served as the basis for the "state of functions", a list regularly established by the Federal Council and approved by Parliament. After a century, the number of functions thus formally defined was 581; it decreased sharply from 1972 and was only 325 when the new Federal Personnel Act of 24 March 2000, which entered into force in 2002, abolished the state of functions, which had become obsolete as its content corresponded less and less to concrete administrative tasks.

Civil servants in the formal sense were appointed for a fixed term (at the Confederation level: three years until 1959, then four years); in principle, they acquired no right to re-election. In its concrete application, the Swiss system of mandates aligned, over time, with the career system in force abroad, insofar as the quadrennial "re-election" became practically automatic. In 1992, however, a fairly high number of civil servants were only re-elected provisionally, in connection with staff reductions in the Military Department (now the Federal Department of Defence, Civil Protection and Sport or DDPS). Parliament still refused in 1995 to replace, for senior civil servants, the period system with the dismissal mechanisms in use in the private economy. It was only with the new Federal Personnel Act that civil servants became employees. The basis of engagement is no longer a quasi-sovereign decision of the State, but an employment contract of normally indefinite duration and which can, under certain conditions, also be terminated by the Confederation.

It took nearly eighty years to establish a uniform and coherent regulation of service relationships for Confederation personnel. Until the end of the 19th century, the provisions of labour law and, especially remuneration, differed according to departments and fields of activity. A law of 1897 unified salaries, but the Military Department escaped it until 1909. After the First World War, the gaps and opacity of labour law in the Confederation were attacked. After lengthy preparation, the Federal Council presented to Parliament in 1924 a draft civil service law, which was adopted in 1927. It imposed the duty of loyalty, the limitation of political activities and the prohibition of strikes. The new Federal Personnel Act, which entered into force in 2002, introduced the notion of collective bargaining agreement in the public services. The current trend is no longer, as in the 1920s, toward uniformity but toward diversification of employment relationships.

At the cantonal level, evolution followed the same path as in the Confederation. At the beginning of the 21st century, the majority of cantons had abolished or revised the civil servant status. Besides the Confederation and the cantons, the approximately 3,000 communes are empowered to establish their own norms for their personnel. The Swiss public sector therefore presents extreme fragmentation in this regard. Greater homogeneity, such as has existed in the private sector for more than a hundred years, remains possible, especially as the difference between private labour law and that of the civil service has been reduced.

In 1997, Parliament decided to divide the Posts, Telegraphs and Telephones (PTT) into two independent companies, Swiss Post and Telecom SA (Swisscom since 1998). The employment contracts of Swisscom employees were based from the beginning on private law. With the new Federal Personnel Act, employees of the Swiss Post and the SBB also lost their civil servant status.

Only the cantons of Geneva and Vaud have known the system of lifelong civil service, as it is widespread abroad, particularly in most European countries. The federal administration and the majority of cantons and communes practice or have practiced, at least from the point of view of legal form, the "mandate system" in which the civil servant is appointed to a specific post for a fixed term; this system has its roots in a republican tradition marked later by direct democracy, a tradition hostile to the career civil service derived from royal courts.

It is necessary to differentiate between civil servant in the formal sense and in the material sense. At the federal level, a civil servant in the formal sense was one who had been appointed as such by the competent authority to occupy a post mentioned in the official list ("state of the functions"). Such was the status, in 1992, of 73% of the 145,000 agents that the Confederation counted (including federal administrations), most of the others being employees. On the other hand, persons working, for a salary, for a federal authority to which they were hierarchically subordinate were considered civil servants in the material sense of the term. This category included not only "employees", but also persons with a particular status, such as professors at the ETH, senior army officers and personal collaborators of federal councillors. Similar differences existed, and still exist in part, at the cantonal and communal levels.

== Size and comparison ==
According to OECD data, 594,800 people worked for a Swiss public administration in 2022, representing 11.2% of the active population. This places Switzerland in the lower third among OECD member countries. By comparison, the figure is 12% in Germany, over 20% in France, and around 30% in Nordic countries such as Norway.

Between 2003 and 2023, while the Swiss population increased by 20%, positions (in full-time equivalents) at the Confederation level increased by only 11.5%. Relative to population growth, the number of civil servants per 1,000 inhabitants decreased by nearly 0.3 points, from 4.6% in 2004 to 4.3% in 2024.

The definition of what constitutes a civil servant varies. Some calculations include employees of semi-public entities such as the Swiss Post, Federal Railways, university hospitals, and subsidized sectors, which can raise the proportion to 23% of the active population. However, the OECD applies a uniform definition across all countries, counting only those directly employed by federal, cantonal, or communal administrations, which allows for international comparison.

== Remuneration ==
According to the Federal Statistical Office, as of 2022 the median monthly salary in the public sector was 8,094 Swiss francs, compared to 6,510 francs in the private sector. This difference is partly explained by the fact that the public sector employs more highly qualified and often older workers. A study by the Swiss Institute of Economic Policy at the University of Lucerne quantified these differences at +19% for low salaries and only +4% for management positions. A comparative study commissioned by the Federal Council and conducted by PWC concluded that public sector salaries are generally similar to those in the private sector, with some positions, particularly management roles, being less well remunerated in the public sector.

In the federal government, only 5% of the population doesn't have Swiss nationality, compared to 34% in the overall active population.

=== Historical evolution ===
For federal civil servants, salary classes were inscribed in the law. Salary adjustments beyond compensation for inflation required a modification of the law and, if an optional referendum was demanded, a popular vote. During the global economic crisis, the Federal Council proposed in 1932 a 10% reduction in salaries. The corresponding law, which provided for a smaller reduction (7.5%), was attacked by referendum and rejected by the people on 28 May 1933. Shortly afterwards, Parliament nevertheless decided, in an emergency procedure, on a 7% reduction, which it would even provisionally raise to 15%. On 3 December 1939, another law on salaries was rejected by the people; it would have led to a modest increase in salaries and a recovery of pension funds.

During the phase of high economic growth that followed the Second World War, civil servants' salaries experienced continuous improvement. Between 1950 and 1991, the purchasing power of the average salary at the Confederation increased by nearly 130%, while the weekly working time decreased from 48 to 42 hours and the minimum duration of vacations from two to four weeks. Automatic compensation for inflation was supplemented by a progressive increase in real wages. The passage of significant portions of personnel into higher salary classes caused an additional increase in the average salary.

The crisis in public finances, which worsened from 1992, led the Confederation (from 1994), as well as numerous cantons and communes, to suppress in part or in totality the adjustments to inflation. Some communities even reduced salaries. The Confederation ordered, in 1996, a reduction in remuneration at the SBB. Finally, the Federal Personnel Act abolished in 2002 the automatic annual increase and introduced a salary calculation model that took into consideration individual performance.

== Unions ==
Trade unions in the public sector are characterized by strong dispersion by branches, fields of activity, salary levels, state levels and ideological orientations. The dominant formation, at the federal level, was the Federative Association of Public Administration and Enterprise Personnel, (Note: German: Föderativverband des Personals öffentlicher Verwaltungen und Betriebe, FöV; French: Union fédérative du personnel des administrations et des entreprises publiques; Italian: Unione federativa del personale delle amministrazioni e imprese pubbliche, UF) an umbrella organization founded in 1903 which grouped together, in 2000, twelve associations (more than 160,000 members). Eight of them were affiliated with the Swiss Trade Union Federation. The umbrella organization represented the "majority unions", as opposed to the "minority unions": five Christian trade unions of transport and Confederation personnel (Transfair from 2000) and five associations not members of an umbrella organization. It was replaced in 2003 by the Federal Staff Negotiating Community (VGB). (Note: German: Verhandlungsgemeinschaft Bundespersonal, VGB; French: Communauté de négociation du personnel de la Confédération, CNPC; Italian: Comunità di negoziazione del personale della Conf, CNPC)

Swiss Union of Public Service Personnel (VPOD), created in 1905, participates in the VGB, but recruits its members almost exclusively at the cantonal and communal levels. There it is in competition with several professional associations, the most important being the Zentralverband Staats- und Gemeindepersonal der Schweiz (founded in 1917, active only in German-speaking Switzerland), whose numbers are growing steadily, while those of the VPOD have stagnated since 1960. In 1992, the two formations had reached a comparable size (about 40,000 members). Overall, the degree of trade union organization in the public service has decreased since 1960; it is especially the associations of the Federative Association that have lost ground.

Civil servants of the Confederation and the majority of cantons were long forbidden to strike. Agents of the Confederation, especially railway workers and a small number of postal employees, took part in the general strike of 1918. Since then, there have been very rare work stoppages, always brief, especially in Geneva (1990, 1992 and 1996). Demonstrations by civil service personnel remained exceptional. The Federative Association organized important ones in 1955, 1966, 1982 and 1996 to protest against salary reductions that threatened the SBB.

For decades, relations between the social partners of the state sector were based on a consensus that agents of the civil service should benefit from working conditions similar to those of private sector employees (principle of parity). However, conflicts erupted over how to compare the two sectors. The majority of unions and personnel associations supported the referendum against the Personnel Act of 24 March 2000, which abolished the absolute protection, although limited to four years, against dismissal of civil servants. In addition, there was fear of a salary evolution similar to that of the private economy, where the remuneration of lower salary classes decreased while those of upper management increased massively. During the vote on 26 November 2000, the law, supported by the Radicals, the Centre Democrats, the Christian Democrats, the Christian Socialists, the Evangelicals and the Freedom Party, was accepted by 66% yes votes.

== Representativeness of the civil service ==
The question of how much the public administration reflects, in the composition of its personnel, the various categories that assert themselves in civil society is increasingly being raised, particularly regarding senior civil servants of the hors classe grade. The significant factors are partisan affinities, mother tongue and sex.

Since 1938, the socioeconomic origin of senior state officials at the federal level has hardly changed. Nearly two-thirds come from the upper or upper-middle classes. Regarding political affinities, liberal predominance is far from having disappeared, even if it has weakened. While it lost the majority in the National Council due to the introduction of proportional representation in 1919, the Liberal Party managed to maintain a strong position in the senior administration, where its sympathizers occupied about half the posts (its members about a third) in the 1980s. Long underrepresented, the Christian Democratic Party achieved, from the 1970s, correct participation. The SP has certainly improved its position, but remains underrepresented. In the 1980s, it occupied a number of key posts roughly equal to that of the Swiss People's Party, which was still, at that time, a significantly smaller party. The magic formula in use in the Federal Council until 2004 therefore had not found application among the civil service elite.

Linguistic balance has been more or less respected at all times. In the 1980s, of the totality of personnel in the general federal administration (that is, without the PTT or the SBB), French speakers were slightly underrepresented, except in the hors classe where they were slightly overrepresented. This point is however regularly the subject of controversies and regulations (Federal Council directives in 1951, 1965 and 1983), aimed especially at German-speaking overrepresentation in key posts, insufficient career opportunities for linguistic minorities and the domination of German in an administration that is in principle trilingual.

After the introduction of women's suffrage at the federal level in 1971, two years passed before a woman was appointed to a hors classe post. In this category, the presence of women in the general federal administration increased from 1.8% to 3.5% between 1982 and 1992; at the PTT and SBB, no woman accessed a hors classe post until 1992.

== Bibliography ==
- Klöti, U. Die Chefbeamten der schweizerischen Bundesverwaltung, 1972
- Lobsiger, E. Personalpolitik und Personalrecht der Schweizerischen Eidgenossenschaft seit Gründung des Bundesstaates, 1975
- Urio, P. et al. Sociologie politique de la haute administration publique de la Suisse, 1989
- Mahon, P. "Le statut des fonctionnaires fédéraux entre révision partielle et révision totale", in Le travail et le droit, éd. J.-L. Duc, 1994
- Germann, R.E., Weis, K. Les administrations cantonales: une vue comparative, 1995 (German edition 1995)
- Fluder, R. Interessenorganisationen und kollektive Arbeitsbeziehungen im öffentlichen Dienst der Schweiz, 1996
- Germann, R.E. Administration publique en Suisse, 1996
- Häfelin, U., Müller, G. Grundriss des Allgemeinen Verwaltungsrechts, 31998
- Michel, M. Beamtenstatus im Wandel, 1998
