= Government and Administration Organisation Act (Switzerland) =

Swiss law defining the rights and procedure of the Federal Administration

Government and Administration Organisation Act (GAOA)

Federal Assembly of Switzerland
- Long title: (SR 172.010)
- Territorial extent: Switzerland
- Enacted by: Federal Assembly of Switzerland
- Enacted: 21 March 1997
- Commenced: 1 October 1997

Repeals
- Administration Organisation Act (1979)
- Status: Current legislation

The Government and Administration Organisation Act (GAOA) (German: Regierungs- und Verwaltungsorganisationsgesetz, RVOG, French: Loi sur l’organisation du gouvernement et de l’administration, LOGA, Italian: Legge sull’organizzazione del Governo e dell’Amministrazione, LOGA), is a Swiss federal law that clarifies the provisions of the Swiss constitution (Title 5) on the rights, duties, tasks, organization and procedure of the Federal Council and the Federal Administration.

It was adopted on 21 March 1997 by the Federal Assembly and came into force on 1 October 1997. It replaces the Administration Organisation Act (German: Verwaltungsorganisationsgesetz, VwOG, French: Loi sur l'organisation de l'administration, LOA, Italian: Legge sull'organizzazione dell'ammininistrazione, LOA) from 1979, which was itself a total revision of the law of 1914.

== See also ==
- Federal Council (Switzerland)
- Federal Administration of Switzerland
