= Systematic Compilation of Federal Legislation =

Former compilation of all Swiss federal laws

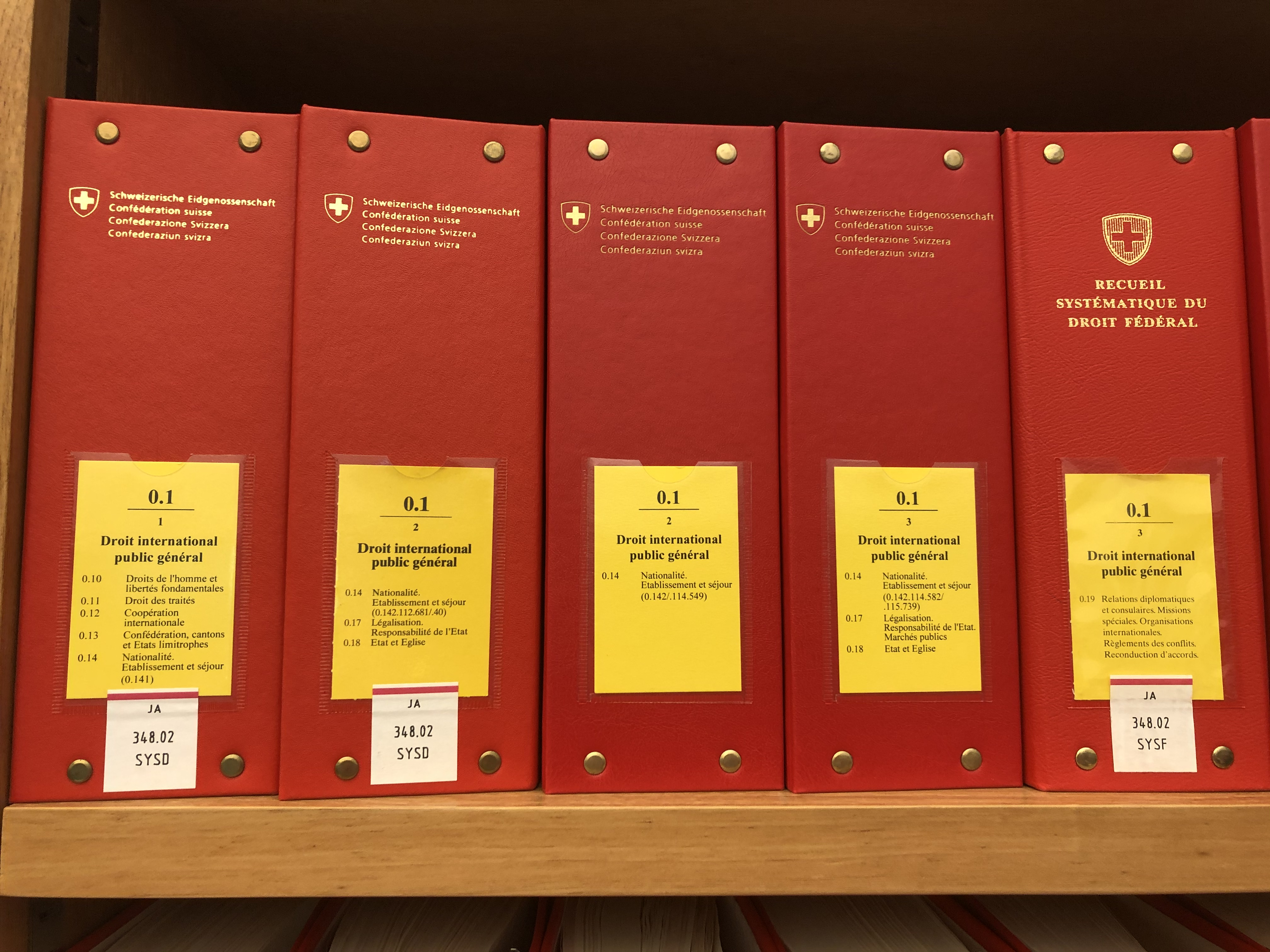
Binders of the SR (here of international law)

The Systematic Compilation of Federal Legislation (SR) (German: Systematische Sammlung des Bundesrechts, SR; French: Recueil systématique du droit fédéral, RS; Italian: Raccolta sistematica, RS) is the official compilation of all Swiss federal laws, ordinances, international and intercantonal treaties that are in force.

It is structured by topic, and comprises the constitutions (federal and cantonal), federal laws, ordinances, select federal decrees and important cantonal texts.

The first version was published in paper form in 1948, in response to the need for legal clarity after World War II. Today, it is available in paper form (in red binders with removable leaves), as well as electronically (available on the Internet). It is published by the Federal Chancellery in Switzerland's three official languages (German, French and Italian), with only a few texts in Romansh and English.

An initial systematic classification system was adopted when the Compilation was created in 1948, but was completely overhauled in the 1960s with the switch to a system of removable leaves. Each act included in the collection has an "SR number" corresponding to its position in the thematic classification. International law in force in Switzerland is classified in the same way, but each number begins with a 0.

Initially conferred with a legal value, it has now been stripped of this, and replaced by the Official Compilation of Federal Legislation (German: Amtliche Sammlung des Bundesrechts, AS; French: Recueil officiel du droit fédéral, RO; Italian: Raccolta ufficiale delle leggi federali, RU).

== History ==
The predecessor of the current SR was the Systematic Collection (German: Bereinigte Sammlung der Bundesgesetze und Verordnungen der Schweizerischen Eidgenossenschaft (BS); French: Recueil systématique des lois et ordonnances de la Confédération suisse (RS); Italian: Collezione sistematica delle leggi e ordinanze della Confederazione svizzera (CS)).

=== Systematic Compilation of Laws and Ordinances of 1948 ===
==== Purpose ====
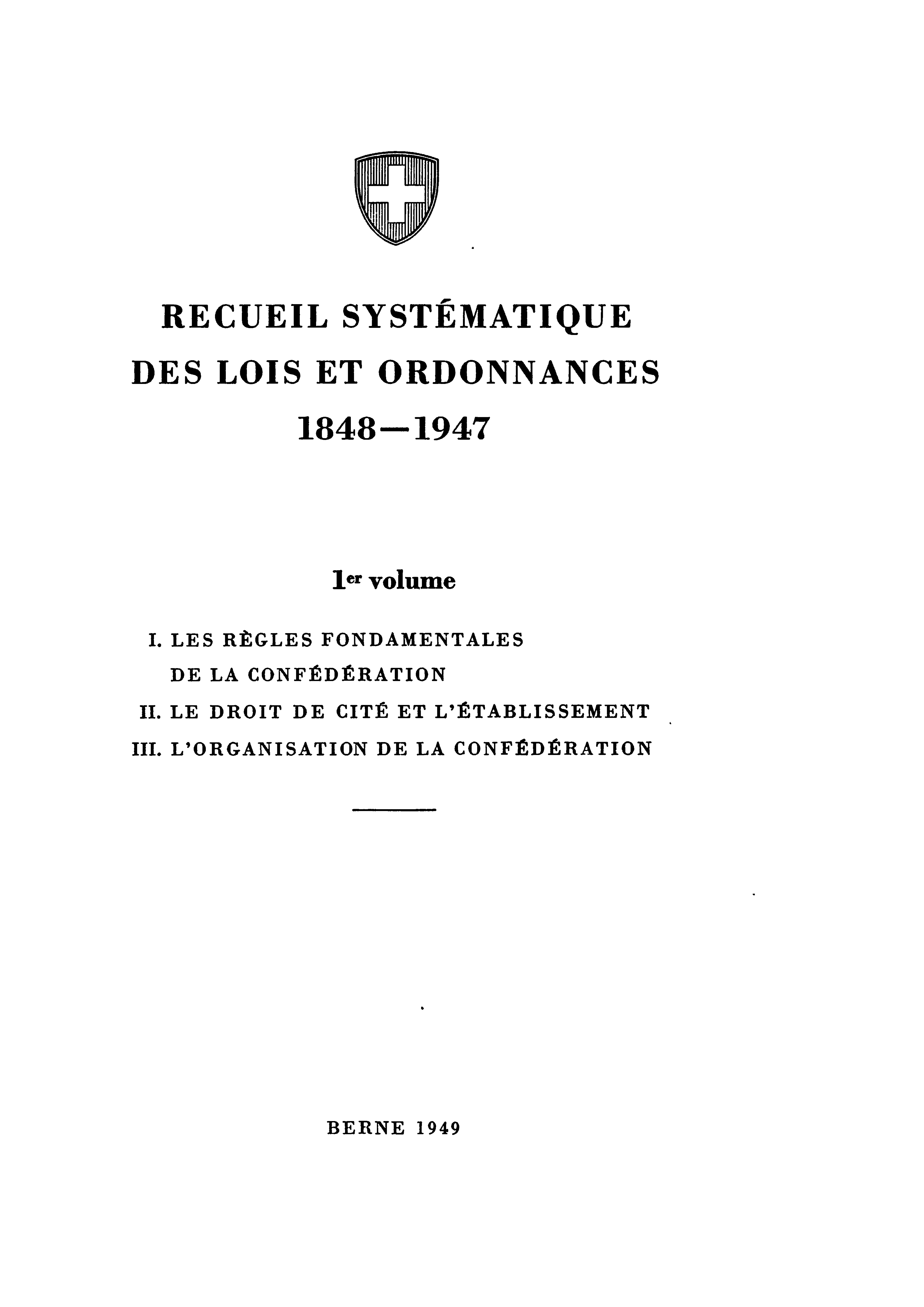
Title page of the 1st volume of the Systematic compilation of laws and ordinances of 1948

By the end of 1945, the Official Compilation of Federal Legislation (AS), created in 1848, had grown to 72 volumes, some of which ran to 2,000 pages. Searching for acts became increasingly complicated, to the point where even the federal administration and specialized authorities "had difficulty determining what was valid and what was no longer". Some volumes were no longer available from the Federal Administration's central printing office, so by 1946 no one could obtain all 72 volumes. As a result, legislative work suffered from a number of shortcomings. In the interests of legal certainty, the creation of an uncluttered compilation had also become necessary because of the prolific crisis and wartime legislative activity of the 1930s and 1940s.

The term "Bereinigung der eidg. Gesetzessammlung" is attested as early as 1931, and "Bereinigte Sammlung der Bundesgesetze" as early as 1938, when the Federal Department of Justice and Police (FDJP) reported on the Federal Council's 1931 decision. In the same letter, the FDJP refers to the Japanese system.

==== February 1946 conference ====
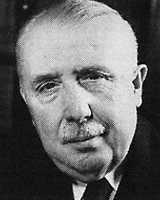
Eduard von Steiger, head of the Federal Department of Justice and Police when the compilation was first conceived, and chairman of the February 1946 conference

The Federal Chancellery, in agreement with the FDJP, asked Max Imboden, then professor at the University of Zurich, to draw up a report on the subject. Following this report, the Federal Council authorized a conference of twelve jurists. The conference met on February 8, 1946, and was composed of several federal judges, representatives of the bar and legal academics, (Note: Members of the commission included the then president of the Swiss Federal Supreme Court, Plinio Bolla, a federal judge, four national councillors, a member of the Council of States, a Bernese member of the Council of States, the president of the Swiss Bar Association and a professor from the University of Zurich, but without Prof. Imboden.) and chaired by the then head of the Federal Department of Justice and Police, Bernese agrarian Eduard von Steiger.

==== Debates at the Federal Assembly ====
The Federal Council presented its message to the Federal Assembly at the end of February 1946, and the National Council took up the matter at the end of March 1946. The Federal Council saw the creation of such a collection as that of a "lasting monument (Note: The German-language version of the Message RS 1946 (read online [archive]) speaks of "bleibendes Dokument schweizerischen Rechtswillens" (p. 388), which can be translated as "durable document of the Swiss legal [or legislative in this context] will".) to ... Swiss legislative work", or even an "intellectual monument that would happily mark the forthcoming commemoration of the Swiss Constitution of 1848".

The Federal Council also intended to publish, along with the Systematic Compilation of laws, a "manual of the usual federal laws and their implementing ordinances". During the introduction debate, the then Genevan Radical National Councillor Adrien Lachenal saw this as an attack on the interests of private printers, wondering "by virtue of what authority and initiative the Chancellery has decided to publish a new manual [sic] on its own initiative". Committee rapporteur Johannes Huber replied that laws are not protected by copyright.

Following the debates, Parliament mandated the Federal Council, via a federal decree dated April 4, 1946, to create a "clearly ordered compilation of federal legislation in force".

==== January 1948 conference ====
A second conference of experts (Note: Presided over by the then President of the Council of States, Alfons Iten, and attended by, among others, Federal Councillor von Steiger, Federal Chancellor Oskar Leimgruber, two federal judges, five national councilors, one member of the Council of States, two law professors and a representative of the Swiss Bar Association.) was held on January 17, 1948, to deal with the Federal Council's supplementary message of 1948 and various technical details. It was at this conference that it was decided to place the article number above the body of the text.

==== Content and publishing ====
The purpose of this systematic collection of laws is to cover legislative acts between 1848 and the end of 1947.

The 1948 Compilation includes only federal law, but in its "cleaned form" (bereinigt in German and the name Bereinigte Sammlung), i.e. still in force at the time of its creation. The new collection was not, however, to include any commentary, "in particular [without] ... giving explanations of a historical nature or referring to doctrine or jurisprudence". A team of nine jurists, accompanied by a stenographer for each official language, was set up to do the "clean-up" work. The Compilation was published from 1949 to 1953, followed by the Registers in 1955, for a total of 15 red volumes, and had an effect on the systematics of today's SR. Germann assumes, however, that jurists are carrying out a clean-up job (Säuberungsarbeit), also in relation to wartime laws still in force.

The 1948 Compilation had a negative effect on the part of the federal legislator, i.e. "all provisions not included in the Compilation are to be considered out of force".

The total cost of printing the 1948 Compilation has been estimated by the Federal Council at CHF 1.5 million (from 1946, approx. CHF 7.5 million in 2019).

==== Table of contents ====
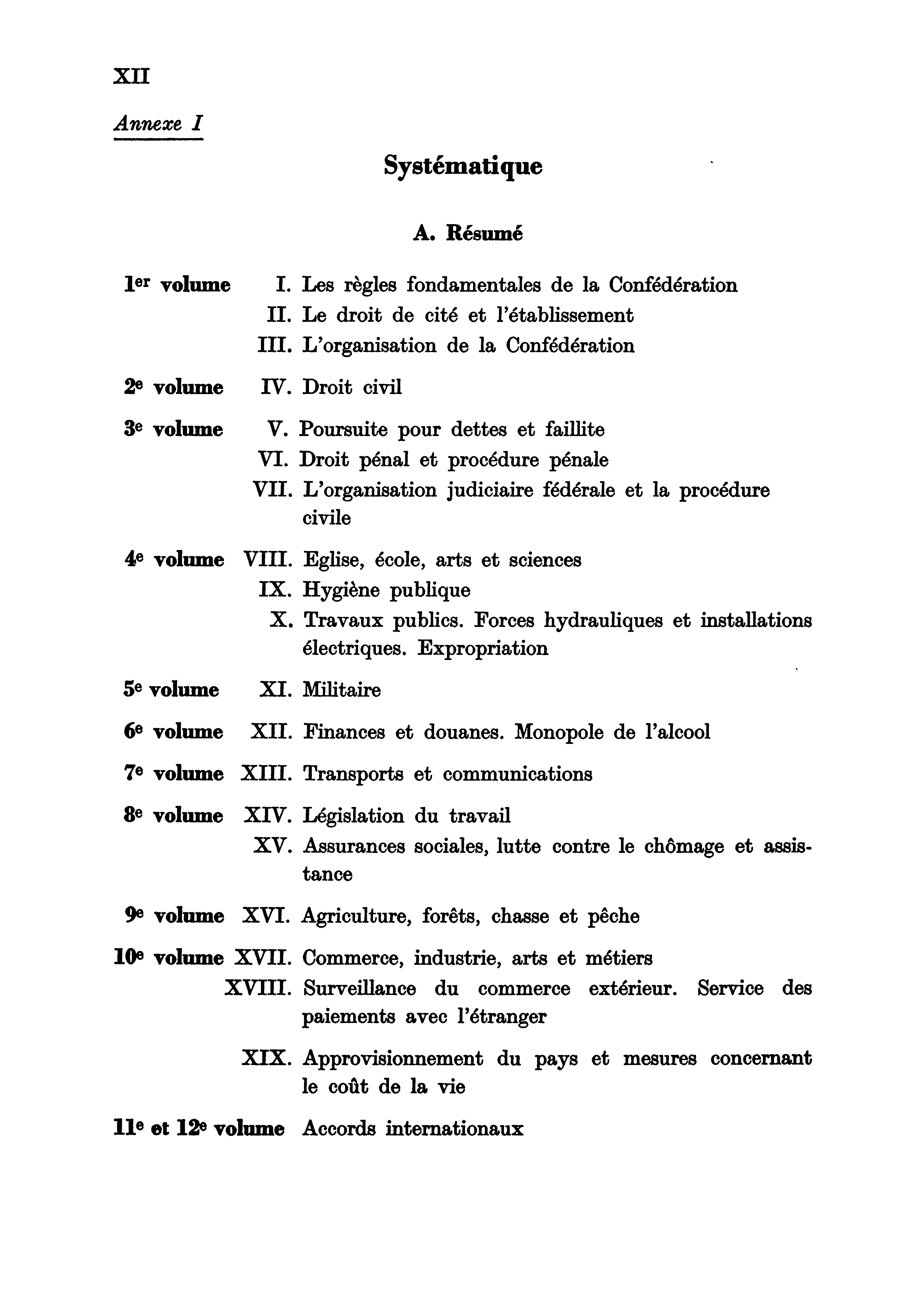
Table of contents of the 1948 Compilation

At the time of its conception, the 1948 Compilation had the following systematics:

Table of contents of the Systematic Compilation of 1948
| Volume | Chapter | Subject |
|---|---|---|
| 1st volume | I. | The fundamental rules of the Confederation |
| 1st volume | II. | Citizenship and settlement |
| 1st volume | III. | The Confederation's organization |
| 2nd volume | IV. | Civil law |
| 3rd volume | V. | Bankruptcy and debt collection |
| 3rd volume | VI. | Criminal law and procedure |
| 3rd volume | VII. | Federal judicial organization and civil procedure |
| 4th volume | VIII. | Church, school, arts and sciences |
| 4th volume | IX. | Public health |
| 4th volume | X. | Public works. Water power and electrical installations. Expropriation |
| 5th volume | XI. | Military |
| 6th volume | XII. | Finance and customs. Alcohol monopoly |
| 7th volume | XIII. | Transport and communications |
| 8th volume | XIV. | Labour legislation |
| 8th volume | XV. | Social security, unemployment and assistance |
| 9th volume | XVI. | Agriculture, forestry, hunting and fishing |
| 10th volume | XVII. | Commerce, industry, arts and crafts |
| 10th volume | XVIII. | Foreign trade monitoring. Foreign Payments Service |
| 10th volume | XIX. | Country supply and cost-of-living measures |
| 11th et 12th volumes | | International agreements |

=== Systematic Compilation of Laws and Ordinances of 1965 ===
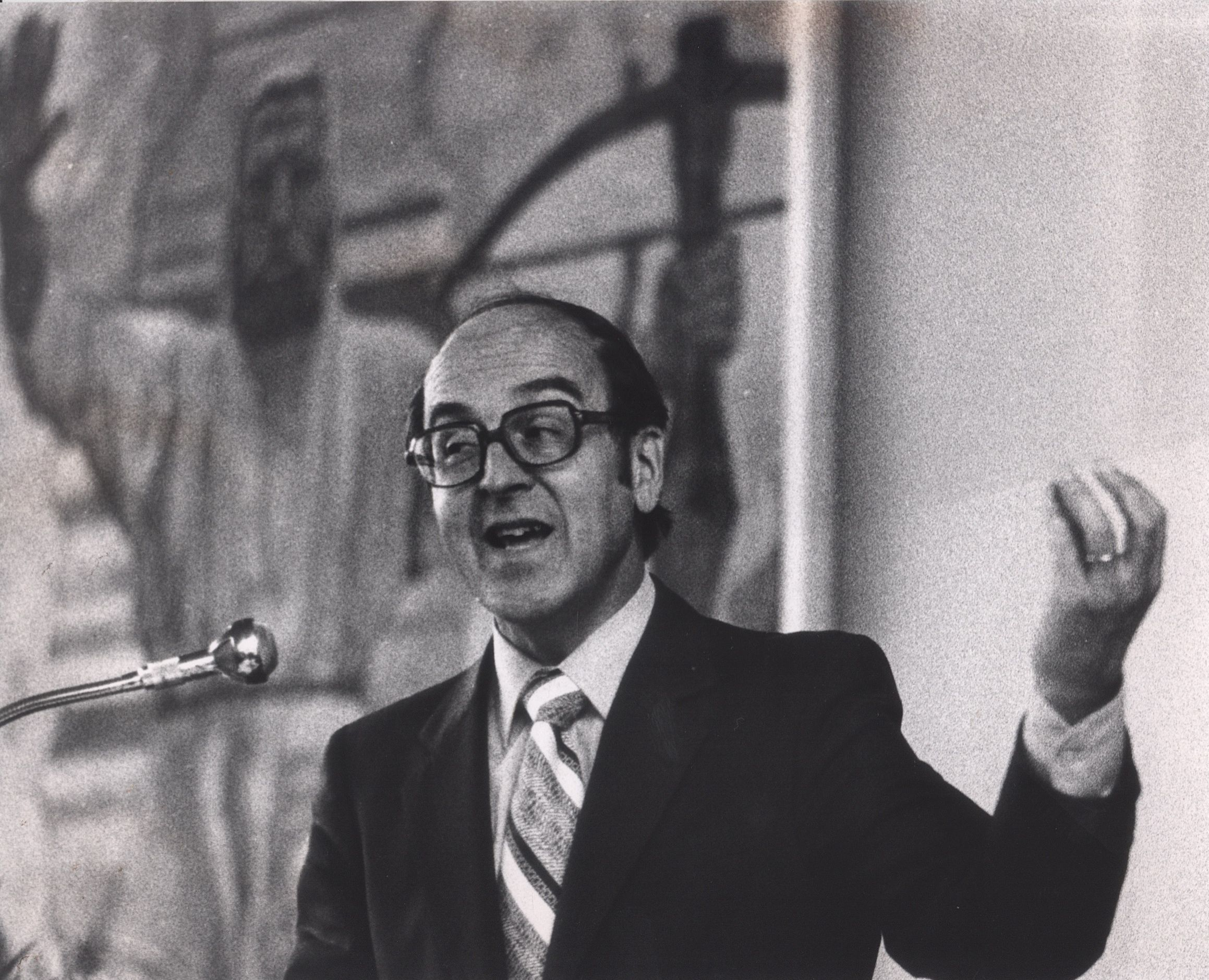
In 1960, National Councillor Kurt Furgler called for the Compilation to be regularly updated.

As soon as the volumes of the first Compilation (from 1948) were published in 1955, it was faced with four amendments to the Federal Constitution and 50 laws or revisions of laws in just seven years. This prompted the then St. Gallen National Councillor Kurt Furgler to submit a postulate in 1960 calling for regular updating of the Compilation. The postulate was debated at the 1961 winter session of the National Council. The Federal Council decided against the motion, but "nevertheless had to submit to the unshakeable will of the Chambers".

During the drafting of a federal law along the lines of the Furgler postulate, the Federal Council received negative opinions about a complete reprint of the 1948 Compilation. These criticisms, summarized in the Federal Council's message, came from the Aargau State Council and the Thurgau Cantonal Court, the former accusing the reprint of "perfectionism ... to throw away, in the stores of the Federal Chancellery but also in the homes of thousands of users, the fifteen volumes of a well-ordered collection in use for just over a decade", while the latter considered that this was of interest only to lawyers. The Federal Supreme Court ruled against the proposed republication. Council of State of Geneva, on the other hand, considers the republication necessary, also for reasons of ease of consultation. In order to cope with regular updating, the Federal Council proposed the publication of acts listed in the SR in loose-leaf form, a system recommended by a large number of the legal players consulted. However, in the view of the Federal Council, this system would have no legal force.

The National Council preferred its committee's proposal over that of the Federal Council and anchored the loose-leaf system in Article 1 of the new law.

=== Creating the current Systematic Compilation ===
The first edition of the SR in its current form began in 1970, with 21 volumes of the "domestic law" section. The publication of quarterly supplements (for the paper version) began in 1971, ending on October 1, 1974.

A complete reprint took place in 1994 and 1995, at the same time as the digitization of the SR. In order to bridge the gap between volume deliveries, supplements were issued every six months; the quarterly frequency resumed in 1996.

=== Digitalization ===
Work on digitizing the SR began in 1989, and "the main aim at the time was to automate the updating and printing of the texts in this collection [the SR], in order to speed up their maintenance".

The first stage, structured text capture using OCR, which took three years.

A postulate submitted by former Schwyz National Councillor Toni Dettling called on the Federal Council to publish the SR in electronic form (citing the CD-ROM as an example). The Federal Council agreed, and the postulate was passed on.

The SR and the Official Compilation (AS) have been published in electronic form since the spring of 1998, but certain parts of the SR have been published in electronic form since 1997, notably in the field of social insurance law, since September 1997. According to Roth, the emphasis within the federal administration was on digitizing the SR, to the detriment of the AS.

== Contents ==
The Systematic Compilation contained:

- texts published in the Official Compilation (AS), with the exception of federal decrees approving treaties or decisions under international law and not containing rules of law, i.e. :
  - federal laws,
  - ordinances,
  - federal decrees,
  - certain international treaties binding on Switzerland,
  - inter-cantonal agreements to which the Confederation has given general binding force (within the meaning of art. 48 Cst.);
- cantonal constitutions.

== Numbering ==
=== Principles ===
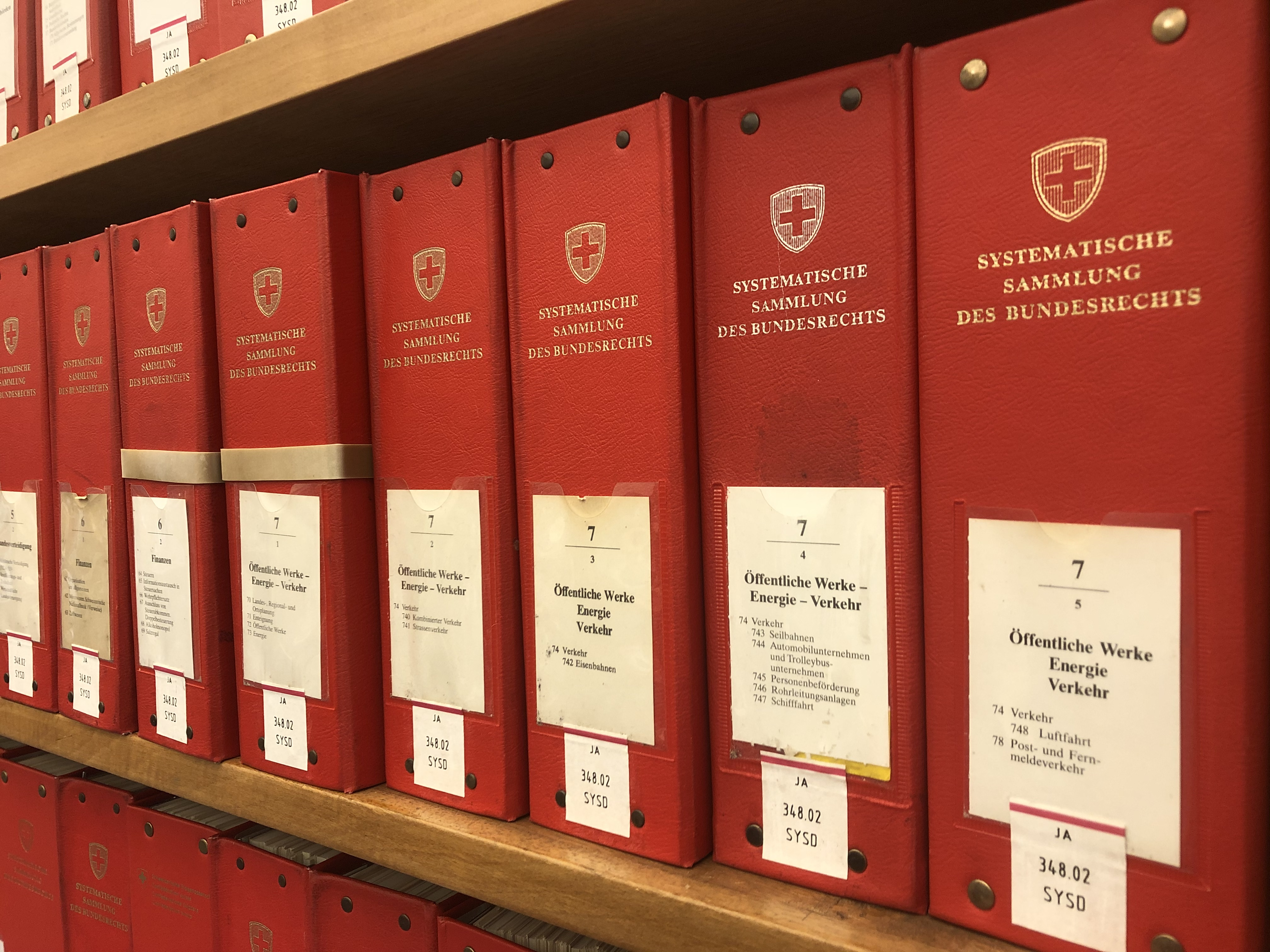
Various volumes of the SR (in German)

Numbering was based on a decimal system, developed between 1967 and 1969. Each act of law (statute, ordinance, international treaty) is given a unique number to identify it, which is the main innovation of the RS. The numbers are arranged in groups of three, separated by a dot on the principle that "the more specific the act, the longer its RS number"; the RS number, however, does not exceed 20 characters (numbers and dots).

For example: the Federal Constitution has the number RS 101, the Civil Code the number RS 210, the Code of Obligations the number RS 220, the LP the number RS 281.1, the European Convention on Human Rights the number RS 0.101, the Vienna Convention on the Law of Treaties the number RS 0.111, the Istanbul Convention the number RS 0.311.35. On the other hand, the Ordinance concerning admission to the École polytechnique fédérale de Lausanne bears the number 414.131.53.

This number must be unique and cannot be reused. It is assigned, at the latest, on publication of the act in the AS and only to so-called "basic acts" ("Grunderlasse"); consequently, amending acts, as a general rule, do not bear it. For example: the Federal Act on Tax Reform and the Financing of the AHV (RFFA) amended several other basic acts, including the Old-age and survivor's insurance - OASI (SR 831.10), the Federal Direct Tax - FTA(SR 642.11) and the Equalization Payments - PFCC (SR 613.2), but did not receive its own RS number.

In the event of total revisions of the act in question, this number may be reassigned to the successor act; however, this presupposes that the predecessor and successor cover exactly the same area of law.

The RS number is assigned according to subject matter, as illustrated in the tables below. The determination of the subject matter depends, among other things, on the constitutional or legal basis mentioned in the introduction to the act in question, and on which federal office is competent. A certain hierarchy is observed by the editors of the RS. Number 631.0, for example, will be a federal law (here the LD), number 631.01 an ordinance of the Federal Council (here the OD) and number 631.011 an ordinance of a federal department (here the OD-DFF).

For the purpose of comparing old and new law, each act published in the RS is cross-referenced to the AS at the bottom of the first page; an exception is made for acts published before 1948, where the number of the Systematic compilation of laws and ordinances is indicated. This reference is made above the first (unnumbered) footnote of the printed version or the PDF version.

=== Overview ===
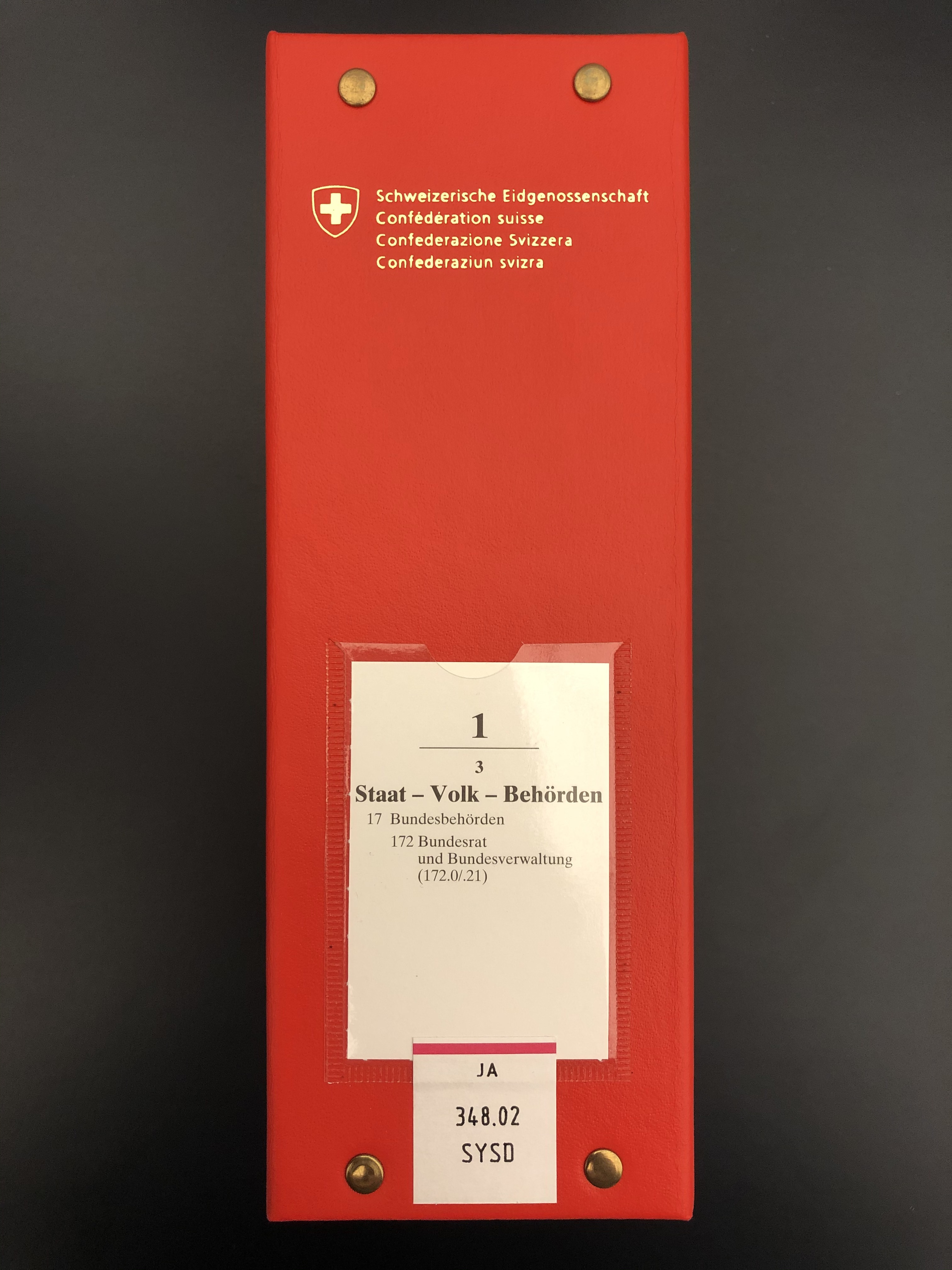
Binder of the Systematic Compilation (in German), here with volume 1 (State - People - Authorities), dealing with the Federal Council and the Federal Administration (nos. 172.0 to 172.21)

The first level of internal law is numbered as follows:

Numbering of domestic law
| N° | Subject |
|---|---|
| 1 | State - People - Authorities |
| 2 | Private law - Civil procedure - Enforcement |
| 3 | Criminal law - Criminal procedure - Enforcement |
| 4 | School - Science - Culture |
| 5 | National defense |
| 6 | Finances |
| 7 | Public works - Energy - Transport and communications |
| 8 | Health - Labour - Social security |
| 9 | Economy - Technical cooperation |

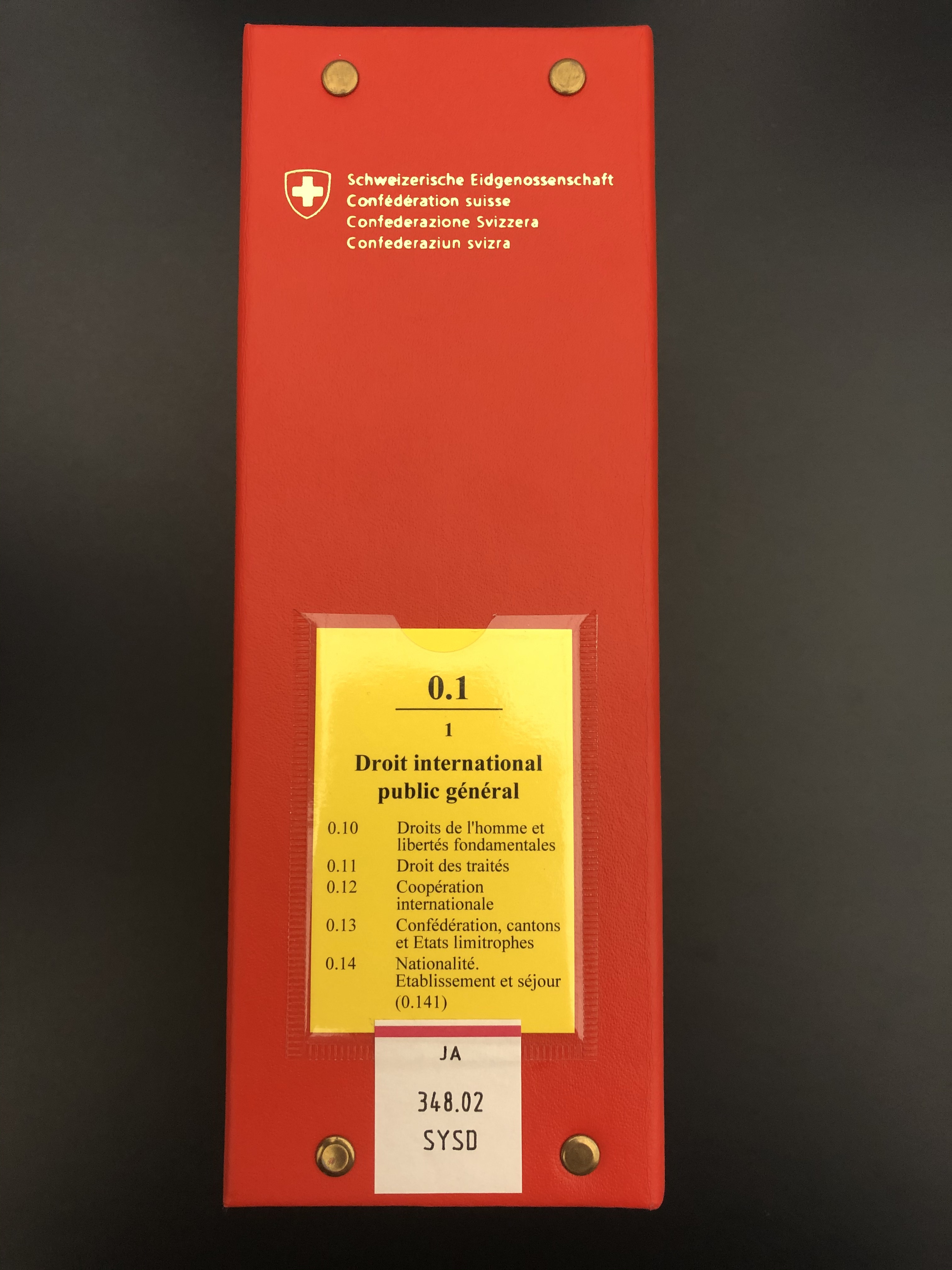
Binder of the SR, here volume 0.1 (General public international law). The topics covered in this binder are indicated on the yellow label (in this case, among others, fundamental rights and the law of treaties).

The numbering of international law at the first level largely follows that of domestic law:

Numbering of international law
| N° | Subject |
|---|---|
| 0.1 | Public international law |
| 0.2 | Private law - Civil procedure - Enforcement |
| 0.3 | Criminal law - Mutual assistance |
| 0.4 | School - Science - Culture |
| 0.5 | War and neutrality |
| 0.6 | Finances |
| 0.7 | Public works - Energy - Transport and communications |
| 0.8 | Health - Labour - Social security |
| 0.9 | Economy - Technical cooperation |

== Characteristics ==
=== Legal basis ===
The SR is governed by the Publications Act (PublA), complemented by the Ordinance on Official Publications (Publikationsverordnung, PublV).

Together with the Official Compilation (AS) and the Federal Gazette, it is considered a "publication organ" by the Federal Council.

=== Versions ===
The RS is available in both paper and electronic formats.

==== Printed version ====
Swiss Confederation logo, featured on the new RSbinders

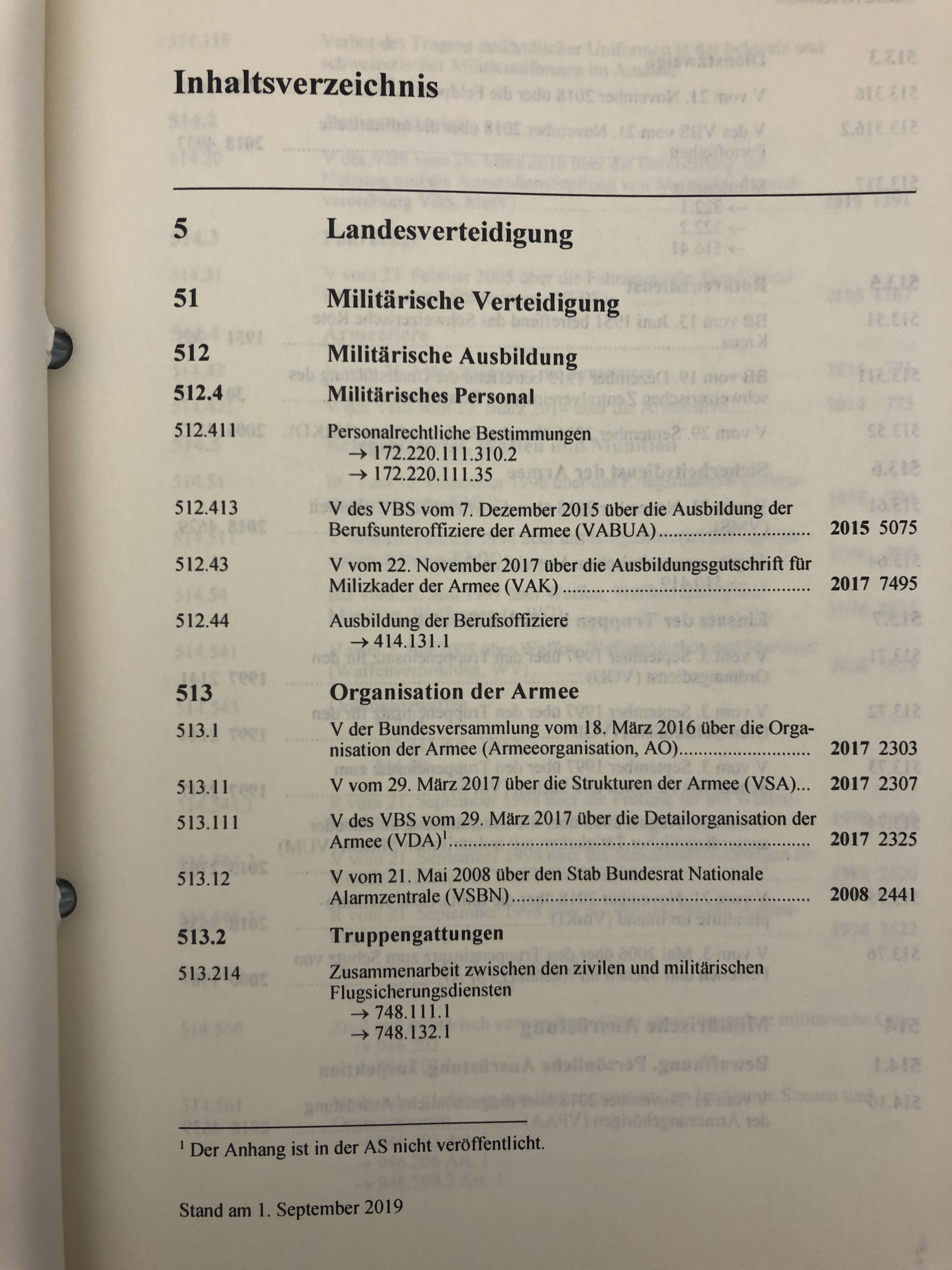
First page of the table of contents of volume 5 of the SR (in German)

The paper version comes in red binders, and the documents are printed in A5 format with the Confederation logo. Each number on the first level has its own binder (for example, one binder for "1 - State - People - Authorities", and another for "3 - Criminal Law - Criminal Procedure - Enforcement"). If there are too many acts for one number, these acts are divided into several binders. Each folder contains a table of contents for the subjects it covers. This table corresponds to the one on the Internet. The paper version is also provided with a keyword directory, also available on the Internet, edited by the Centre des Publications Officielles.

When an act is revised (e.g. the addition of an article to the Federal Constitution following a popular vote), a supplement is delivered by the Federal Office for Buildings and Logistics for the entire act concerned by the revision, regardless of the number of pages affected. Delivery only takes place on a quarterly basis, to allow time between the entry into force of the revision and the delivery of the consolidated paper version.

==== Electronic version ====
The electronic version contains, for each published act, an HTML version, a PDF version and a chronology of the act. The PDF version is identical to the printed version. A CD-ROM version, published four times a year in the official languages, was available from 2000 until at least 2009, and until at least 2013 for the DVD format.

==== Footnote system ====
When a law is modified, this is mentioned in the act consolidated in the RS using a footnote. The position of the callout (superscript number) indicates which part of the act has been modified. The footnote indicates the amending act, its nature (e.g. federal law or ordinance), its subject matter, the date of its adoption, and the date of its entry into force. It also states whether the provision has been newly introduced, amended, or abrogated. If a provision of an act is introduced but subsequently repealed, a note mentions both legislative events.

For research purposes, the note also mentions the position of the amending act in the AS and that of the Federal Council's message in the Federal Gazette (German: Bundesblatt, BBl; French: Feuille fédérale, FF; Italian: Foglio federale, FF; Romansh: Fegl uffizial federal, FF). If the amending act stems from a parliamentary initiative, the note mentions the position of the committee report in the Federal Gazette, as well as the opinion of the Federal Council.

=== Use ===
The SR can be seen as a more intuitive representation of the law at a given point in time ("benutzerfreundlichen" Abbildung des Rechts zu einem bestimmten Zeitpunkt") and as an information medium in its own right, making it "de facto much more frequently consulted than the AS". In its early days, the SR was described as "an extremely valuable working tool for all those who have to implement legislation".

Moll points out that the SR retains a prominent place in legal research, as the Confederation's legislative technique is centered on the SR, despite its lack of binding force.

=== Updating and publishing ===
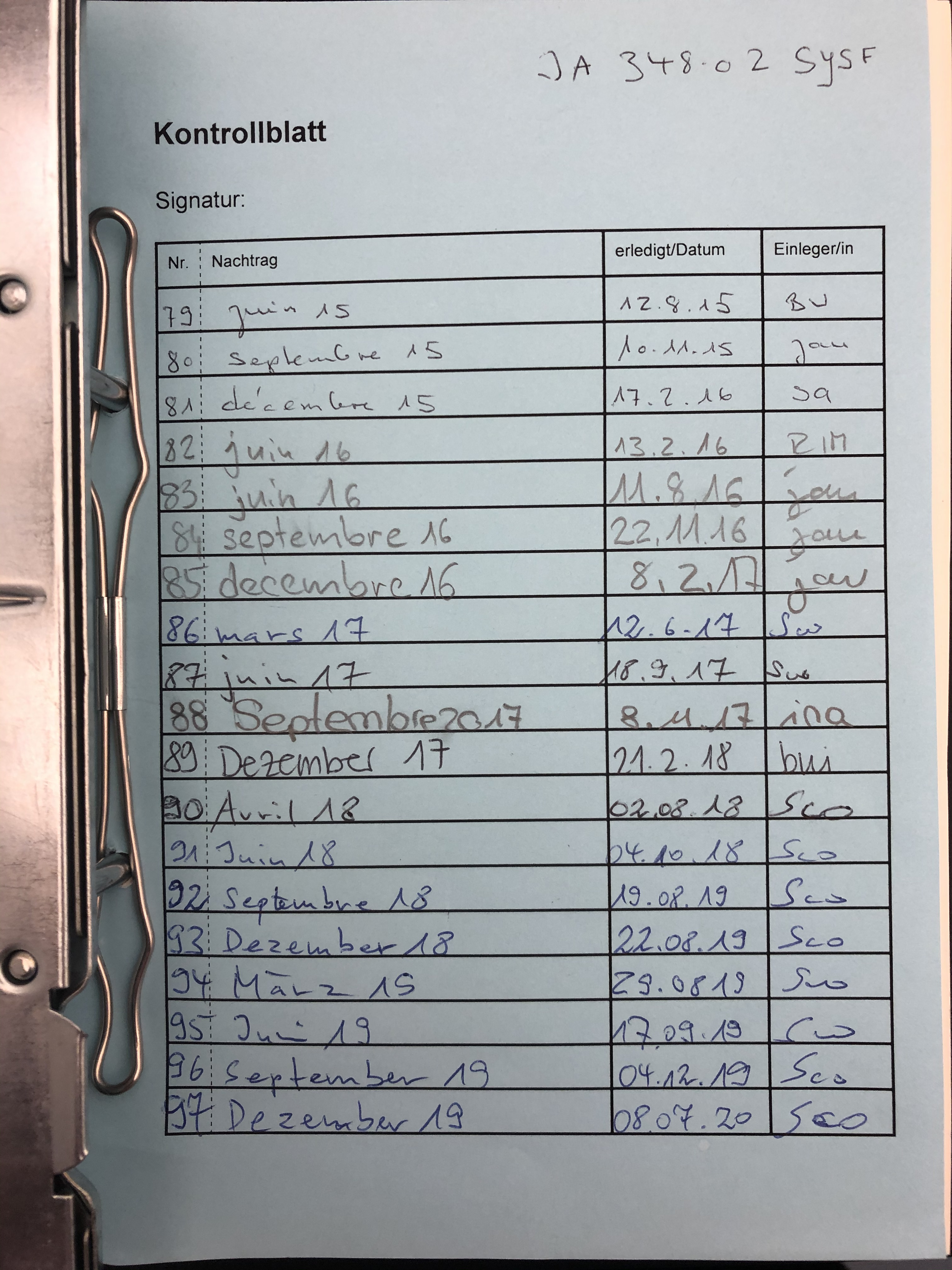
Control page (Kontrollblatt in German) where updates to the Recueil systématique are noted (here for volume 0.1 from June 2015 to December 2019)

The printed version of the SR is delivered four times a year. The electronic version is continuously updated. In 1989, the printed version of the SR consisted of around 100,000 pages (approx. 4 GB) for the three official languages. In 2014, the paper version comprised 29 red binders for domestic law and 32 for international law.

The Federal Chancellery can also publish compilations of texts in the SR. This is the case, for example, with the compilation entitled "Procédure fédérale" (Federal Procedure), which brings together over thirty acts published in the SR concerning federal bodies and procedures.

The editing of the SR is entrusted to the Official Publications Centre (attached to the Federal Chancellery).

The Federal Office for Buildings and Logistics (attached to the FDF) is responsible for the distribution and sale of publications governed by the PublA, including the SR. Sales prices are set by an ordinance specific to federal publications.

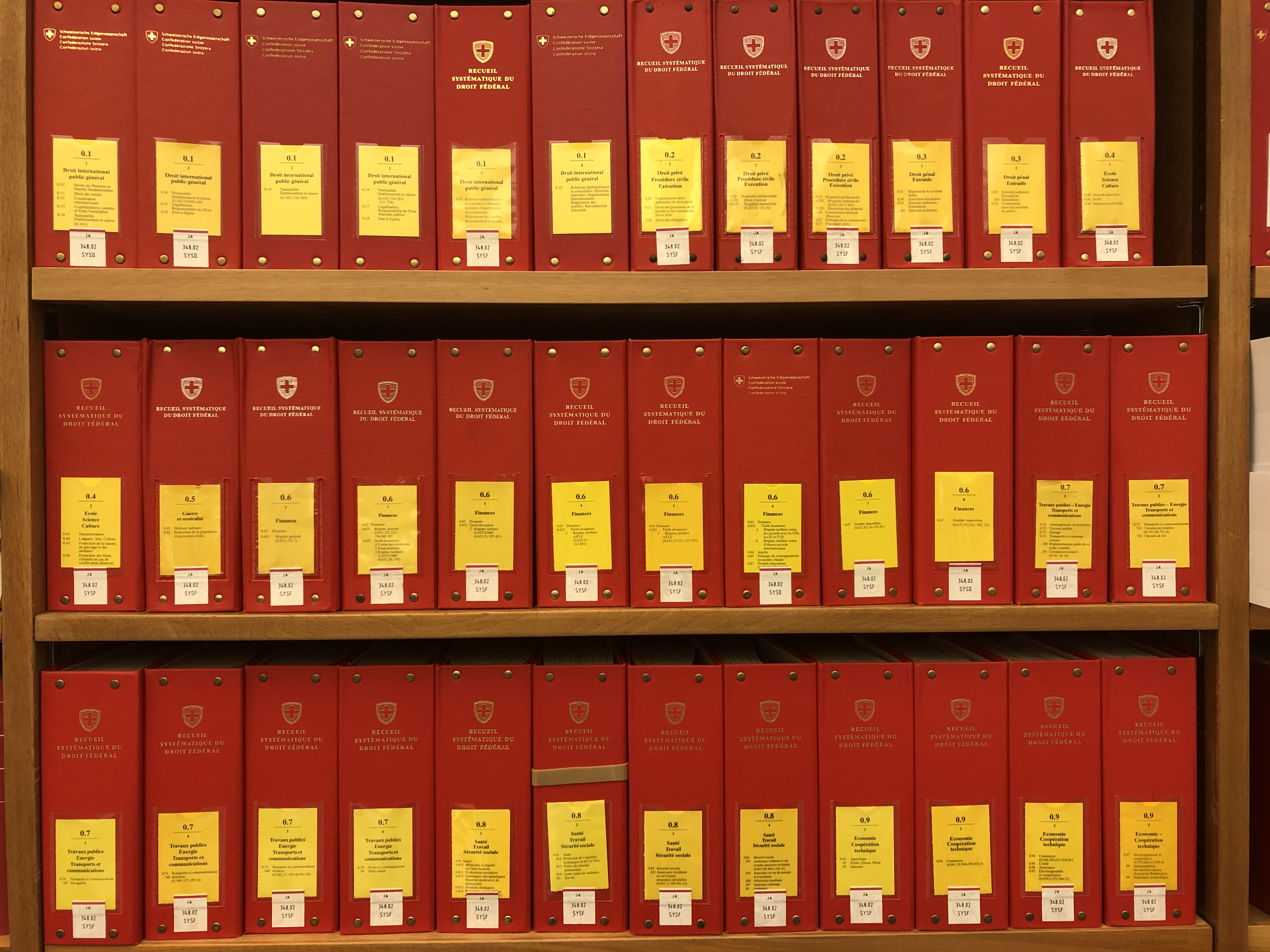
The 36 binders of international law published in the Recueil systématique in 2020

=== Number of SR volumes ===
The number of SR volumes has evolved over time. In 1955, it represented 15 binders (domestic and international law), 21 binders in 1970 and 24 domestic law binders in 1986. In 2014, it breaks down into 29 domestic law binders and 32 international law binders.

== Languages ==
RS is published in the three official languages, German, French and Italian.

=== Publication in Romansh ===
When the old PublA of 1986 was adopted, the place and value of Romansh was discussed in the Council of States. A Jagmetti proposal was to include a "systematic abridged compilation of federal law" in Romansh, but the acts published in this abridged compilation would not become law. Rapporteur Meylan considered that such a proposal would run counter to the systematics of the law (proposed by the Federal Council), as it would give legal force to Romansh. Arguing against the proposal, the then Chancellor of the Confederation, the Basel socialist Walter Buser, gave the following example: if a Romansh-speaking citizen were to appear before a judge with such an abridged Compilation in Romansh, the judge would have no choice but to reply that federal law in Romansh had no legal value, since the RO was not published in Romansh and the SR had, with the PublA, lost its legal value. The Chancellor assumed that such an abridged compilation could only cause confusion (Verwirrung). This proposal was rejected by the Council of States by 17 votes to 8.

Since the PublA came into force, publications in Romansh have followed the provisions of the Language Act (LLC; SR 441.1), i.e. "texts of particular importance" are published in the fourth national language. This applies in particular to the Federal Constitution, the Civil Code, the Penal Code and the PublA, for a total of some seventy acts. The acts published in Romansh are prefaced with this banner:

« Rumantsch è ina lingua naziunala, ma ina lingua parzialmain uffiziala da la Confederaziun, numnadamain en la correspundenza cun persunas da lingua rumantscha. La translaziun d’in decret federal serva a l’infurmaziun, n’ha dentant nagina validitad legala. »

This indication can be translated as :

"Romansh is a national language, but only a semi-official language of the Confederation, i.e. for correspondence with Romansh speakers. The translation of a federal act is for information purposes, but has no legal value."

=== Publication in English ===
In addition, domestic legal texts of major scope or international interest are published in English. As English is not an official or national language, documents translated into English are prefaced by:

« English is not an official language of the Swiss Confederation. This translation is provided for information purposes only and has no legal force. »

== Legal value ==
The legal value of SR has changed over time.

=== Ex-post legal effectiveness ===
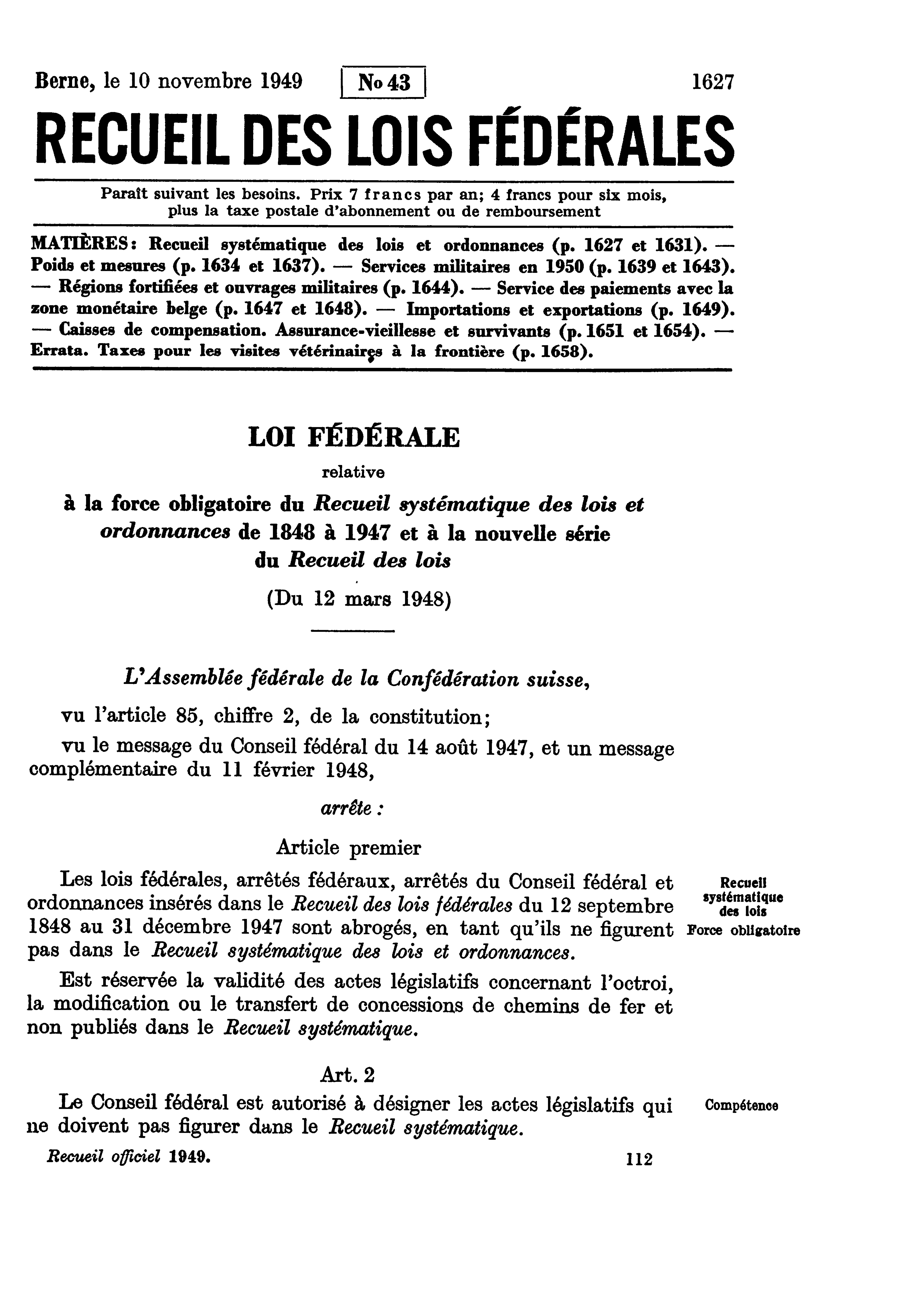
First page of the 1948 Act granting binding force to the 1948 Recueil des lois (RO 1949 1627)

The 1948 Systematic Compilation was not binding from the outset.

Before preparing a law to this effect, the Federal Administration carried out a "meticulous sorting of the legislative acts contained in the 73 volumes of the Systematic Compilation". Subsequently, the Federal Council decided to propose granting a negative effect to the 1948 Compilation, namely that "legislative acts not included in the Compilation would be declared out of force". The positive binding effect (i.e. the granting of binding force and validity to any act present in the Compilation) was not considered adequate. Even after careful examination, the Federal Council could not rule out omissions (in this case, the inclusion in the Compilation of acts that had in fact been repealed), thereby jeopardizing the "clarity of the legislation". However, in the same message, the Federal Council admits that the negative effect is not a miracle or perfect solution.

The 1948 Compilation was therefore given binding force with the ad hoc 1948 law. Article 1:

"The Federal Laws, Federal Decrees, Federal Council Decrees and Ordinances inserted in the Compilation of Federal Laws from September 12th, 1848 to December 31st, 1947 are hereby abrogated, insofar as they do not appear in the Systematic Compilation of Laws and Ordinances."

The reason given at the time for this ex-post decision was that the act creating the 1948 Compilation was merely a federal decree, and not a federal law subject to optional or mandatory referendum. What's more, the Federal Constitution of 1874 did not provide for any power to grant value to the 1948 Compilation. The Federal Council did, however, consider that the granting of a status was a decision for the legislator. In fact, it "does not do any legislative work as such, but ... [confined itself] to interpreting the law" by declaring the invalidity of repealed provisions not included in the Compilation (in accordance with the principle of lex posterior derogat lex anteriori). The basis for this was art. 85 para. 2 Cst. 1874, which states that "matters falling within the competence of the Federal Assembly include the following: Laws and decrees on matters which the constitution places under federal jurisdiction".

=== Return to the primacy of the Official Compilation ===
When the old PublA of 1986 was introduced, which codified the AS, Federal Gazette and SR, the question of the prevalence of such a publication was raised.

The Federal Council considered it advisable to withdraw the negative binding force for three reasons. On the one hand, the Federal Council believed that the granting of binding force in 1948 was due to doubts about the validity of a number of acts resulting from the emergency legislation passed during World War II. On the other hand, legal certainty must prevail, and consequently, only one publication (in this case, the AS) should benefit from primacy. Finally, and in line with the last argument, the physical nature of the SR (a loose-leaf collection) may present a risk of discrepancies with the AS (particularly in the event of delays in delivery or layout). The Federal Council therefore refrained from using retroactivity in order to withdraw the SR's negative binding force. Thanks to the PublA, René Meylan, Socialist State Councillor from Neuchâtel and the commission's rapporteur on this message, considered that the nature of the SR was to be "clearer and better defined than in the past".

Since May 15, 1987, when the PublA came into force, the SR no longer had any legal value, since only the AS was endowed with negative binding force (this quality means that "acts which are not published in the official gazette cannot be applied to subjects of law").

=== Latest developments ===
A postulate submitted in 2014 by Fribourg Socialist National Councillor Ursula Schneider Schüttel called on the Federal Council "to study the possibility of giving official status to the consolidated version of laws, indicating the means that would be required for this purpose (in time, money, human resources)". It was adopted by the National Council in the autumn 2014 session. Following this postulate, the Federal Council produced a report which concluded that "several practical reasons ... prevent ... to ... expressly confer a legally decisive character [to the SR]", as this would require a complete overhaul of the PublA as well as the revision of several laws affecting Parliament and the federal administration.

== Appendix ==
=== Laws and ordinances ===
- Federal Constitution of the Swiss Confederation (Constitution) (in French). 29 May 1874.
- Federal Constitution of the Swiss Confederation (Constitution) (in French). 18 April 1999.
- Loi fédérale du 12 mars 1948 relative à la force obligatoire du Recueil systématique des lois et ordonnances de 1848 à 1947 et à la nouvelle série du Recueil des lois (PDF) (Act) (in French). 10 November 1949.
- Loi fédérale concernant la publication d'un nouveau Recueil systématique des lois et ordonnances de la Confédération (PDF) (Act) (in French). 12 January 1967.
- Loi fédérale du 21 mars 1986 sur les recueils de lois et la Feuille fédérale (PDF) (Act) (in French). 28 April 1987.
- Federal Act on the Compilations of Federal Legislation and the Federal Gazette (Act) (in French). 18 June 2004.
- Ordonnance sur les recueils du droit fédéral et la Feuille fédérale (Ordinance) (in French). 7 October 2015.

=== Bibliography ===
- Moll, Bernard (2009). Das Konsolidieren von Erlassen am Beispiel der Systematischen Sammlung des Bundesrechts (SR) (in German) (2 ed.). LeGes. pp. 215–233. Archived from the original on 20 August 2023.
- Marius, Roth (2013). Aktuelle Anforderungen an amtliche Sammlungen (in German) (1 ed.). LeGes. pp. 33–62. Archived from the original on 25 August 2023.
- Urs, Germann (2011). Vom Aufkleben des Rechts: die Entstehung der Bereinigten Sammlung des Bundesrechts in einer verwaltungsgeschichtlichen Perspektive [Concerning the compilation of law. The genesis of the corrected collection of federal law in an administrative history perspective]. Administrer et gouverner (in German). Vol. 18 (3 ed.). Traverse. pp. 114–126. ISBN 978-3-905315-52-3. ISSN 1420-4355. Archived from the original on 25 August 2023.

=== Official documents ===
==== Messages from the Federal Council ====
- ^{(fr)} "Message du Conseil fédéral du 22 février 1946 à l'Assemblée fédérale concernant la publication d'un Recueil des lois mis à jour (période de 1848 à 1947)", Feuille fédérale, vol. I, no. 5, February 22, 1946, pp. 371–378 (read online archive [PDF]).
- ^{(fr)} "Message du Conseil fédéral du 14 août 1947 à l'Assemblée fédérale concernant à la force obligatoire du Recueil systématique des lois et ordonnances mis à jour et à la nouvelle série du Recueil des lois", Feuille fédérale, vol. II, no. 33, August 21, 1947, pp. 717–738 (read online archive [PDF]).
- ^{(fr)} "Message complémentaire du Conseil fédéral du 11 février 1948 à l'Assemblée fédérale concernant à la force obligatoire du Recueil systématique des lois et ordonnances mis à jour (1848-1947) et à la nouvelle série du Recueil des lois", Feuille fédérale, vol. I, no. 7, February 19, 1948, pp. 817–832 (read online archive [PDF]).
- ^{(fr)} "Message du Conseil fédéral du 19 février 1965 à l'Assemblée fédérale concernant la publication d'un nouveau Recueil systématique des lois et ordonnances de la Confédération", Feuille fédérale, vol. I, no. 8, February 26, 1965, pp. 317–329 (read online archive [PDF]).
- ^{(fr)} "Message du 29 juin 1983 concernant une loi fédérale sur les recueils de lois et la Feuille fédérale", Feuille fédérale, vol. III, no. 35, September 6, 1983, pp. 441–489 (read online archive [PDF]).
- ^{(fr)} "Message du 22 octobre 2003 concernant la loi fédérale sur les recueils du droit fédéral et la Feuille fédérale", Feuille fédérale, no. 46, November 25, 2003, pp. 7047–7079 (read online archive [PDF]).
- ^{(fr)} "Message du 28 août 2013 relatif à la modification de la loi sur les publications : (Passage de la primauté de la version imprimée à la primauté de la version électronique des publications officielles)", Feuille fédérale, no. 37, September 24, 2013, pp. 6325–6364 (read online archive [PDF]).

==== Debates in Parliament ====
- Procès-verbal du Conseil national (PDF) (in French). 28 March 1946.
- Procès-verbal du Conseil national (PDF) (in French). 4 April 1946.
- Procès-verbal du Conseil national (PDF) (in French). 30 June 1966.
- Procès-verbal du Conseil national (PDF) (in French). 11 March 1986.

==== Postulates ====
- ^{(fr)} Objet 8092: Postulat Furgler du 29 juin 1960 "Mise à jour du Recueil des lois" read online, objet no 70 p. 18 archive.
- ^{(fr)} Objet 96.3162: Postulate Dettling of March 22, 1996. "Recueil systématique sur support informatique" read online archive.
- ^{(fr)} Objet 14.3319: Postulate Schneider Schüttel of May 7, 2014. "Publication of laws. Giving official status to the consolidated version" read online archive.

==== Swiss Federal Council reports ====
- ^{(fr)} Federal Council, Rapport de gestion 1996: Rapport du Conseil fédéral sur les points essentiels de la gestion de l'administration, 1997 (read online archive [PDF]).
- ^{(fr)} Federal Council, Publication des lois. Donner un caractère officiel à la version consolidée: Rapport du Conseil fédéral en exécution du postulat 14.3319 Schneider Schüttel du 7 mai 2014, October 19, 2016 (read online archive [PDF]).

==== Documents from the Federal Chancellery ====
- ^{(de)} Bereinigte Gesetzsammlung. Protokoll der Expertenkonferenz vom 17. Januar 1948, 1948, in Swiss Federal Archives, Bereinigte Sammlung der Bundesgesetze und Verordnungen für die Jahre 1848-1947, Korrespondenz mit den übrigen Departementen (Dossier), cote E1#1000/4#147* (read online archive).
- Chancellerie fédérale, Explication des annotations, July 1, 2019 (read online archive [PDF]).
- Chancellerie fédérale, Principes suivis pour la publication des accords internationaux (read online archive [PDF]).

==== Documents from the Federal Department of Justice and Police ====
- ^{(de)} Brief vom 16. November 1938 des Eidgenössischen Justiz- und Polizeidepartements an die Schweizerische Bundeskanzlei (Nr. V.12.). Bereinigte Sammlung der Bundesgesetze in Swiss Federal Archives, Bereinigte Sammlung der Bundesgesetze und Verordnungen für die Jahre 1848-1947 (dossier), cote E1#1000/4#144* (read online archive).

=== Related articles ===
- Law of Switzerland
- List of Swiss Federal Acts
- Official Compilation of Federal Legislation
- Federal Gazette
- United States Code
- Code of Federal Regulations
- Publications Act (Switzerland)

=== External links ===
- Systematic Compilation
