= Publications Act (Switzerland) =

2004 law on compilations of federal law

Publications Act (PublA)
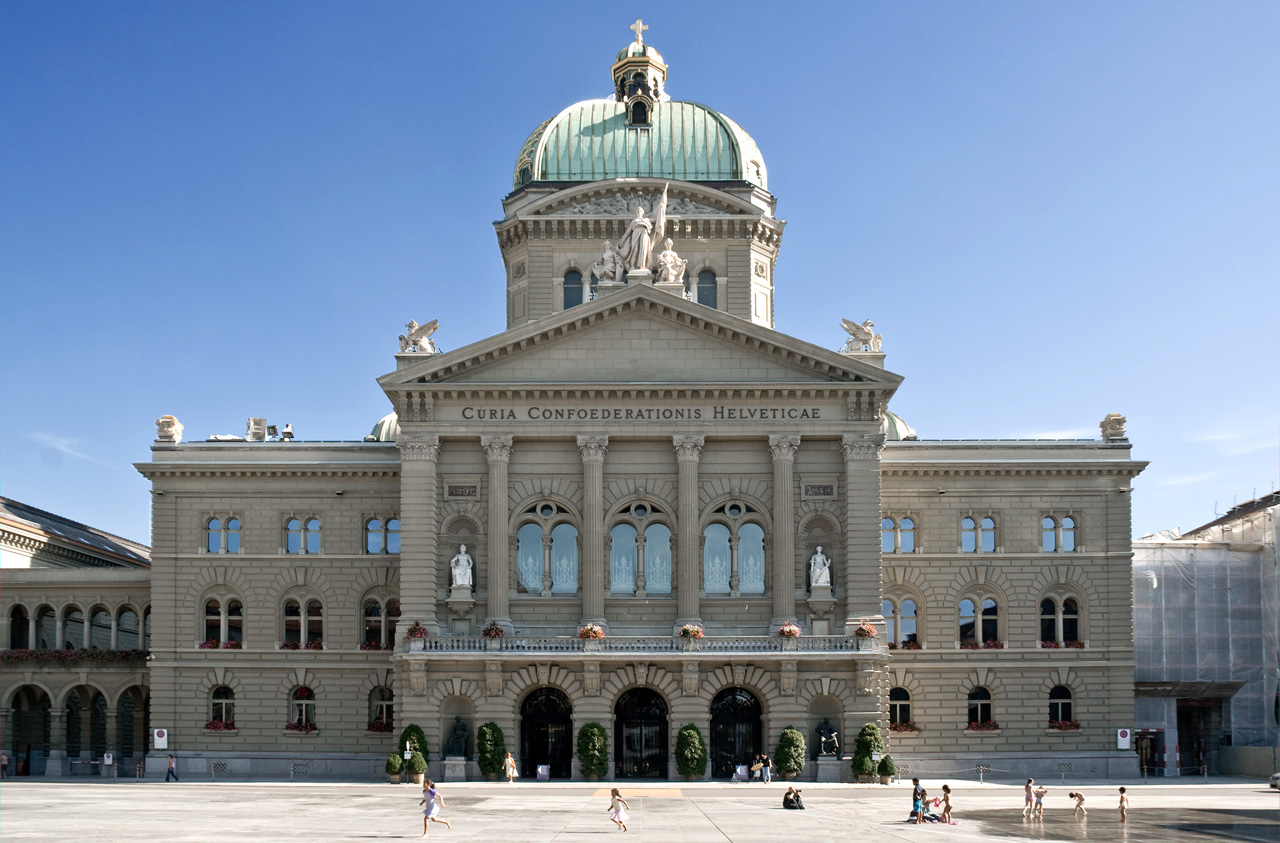

Federal Assembly of Switzerland
- Long title: Federal Act on the Compilations of Federal Legislation and the Federal Gazette (SR 170.512)
- Territorial extent: Switzerland
- Enacted by: Federal Assembly of Switzerland
- Enacted: 18 June 2004
- Commenced: 1 January 2005

Repeals
- Publications Act (1984)
- Status: Current legislation

The Publications Act (PublA) (Note: German: Publikationsgesetz, PublG; French: Loi sur les publications officielles, LPubl; Italian: Legge sulle pubblicazioni ufficiali, LPubb) is a Swiss federal law that governs the publication of the compilations of federal law (Official Compilation and Systematic Compilation) and of the Federal Gazette. It was adopted on 18 June 2004 by the Federal Assembly and came into force on 1 January.

The law replaces the previous Publications Act from 1984. Some of the key changes include the introduction of a legal basis for the electronic publication of legal texts on the internet. Prior to the law of 1984, the topic was regulated through the Ordinance of 5 March 1849 on the publication of a Federal Gazette. (Note: German: Verordnung betreffend die Herausgabe eines Bundesblattes; French: Ordonnance relative à la publication d'une Feuille fédérale; Italian: Ordinanza sulla pubblicazione di un foglio federale)

== See also ==
- Federal Gazette (Switzerland)
- Official Compilation of Federal Legislation
- Systematic Compilation of Federal Legislation
