= Agricultural lease in Switzerland =

Agricultural land tenancy in Switzerland

An agricultural lease (German: Pacht; French: bail à ferme or fermage) is a contract derived from Roman law by which a landlord (lessor) grants a tenant (lessee or farmer) the use of agricultural land—or of rights and goods enabling the exercise of a trade—for a defined period and on individually negotiated conditions, in exchange for the payment of rent, also called fermage. Difficult to distinguish from older forms of tenure before the 15th century, the agricultural lease in Switzerland is linked to the emergence of proto-capitalism in agriculture.

== Middle Ages and early modern period ==
From 1300, and especially after 1350, the area of present-day Switzerland—particularly near the cities—saw an increased dynamization and capitalization of the land market, with the agricultural lease, the closely related rent (Miete), and new forms of credit growing in importance. The urban upper class of Lucerne, Zürich, and smaller towns took over land as hereditary fiefs from financially pressed ecclesiastical and secular lordships, leasing it on short terms and on conditions aligned to the needs of urban markets. In rural Alpine regions such as Uri, well-off peasants in the 14th century also acquired land from outside monasteries in order to sublease it, which—together with the granting of credit—strengthened economic dependencies and social inequalities. Besides agricultural land, leases could cover commercial operations such as mills and inns, rights such as the tithe, or livestock (Viehverstellung).

In terms of duration, three forms of agricultural lease can be distinguished: the hereditary lease (Erbpacht), in principle perpetual; the lifetime lease, ending with the tenant's death; and the term lease (Zeitpacht), generally concluded for a cycle of three years or a multiple thereof. Rent could be paid in kind or in money, and was either fixed (Fixpacht) or consisted of a previously agreed share of the yield (Teilpacht or sharecropping).

=== Distribution and regional patterns ===
In early modern Switzerland, where freehold (Allod) and direct cultivation under tenure dominated, the agricultural lease was clearly less widespread than in France or Italy; it is estimated to have covered around 10 percent of the agricultural area. It nonetheless gained in importance in the 18th century. It was particularly used near the cities, on lands belonging to patricians and prosperous burghers, and in market-oriented regions of livestock farming (such as the Pre-Alps) and viticulture (such as French-speaking Switzerland). Leases were also concluded among peasants, often within a family at the generational transfer of a farm.

In German-speaking Switzerland, the agricultural lease was relatively rare and generally concerned vineyards, heavily indebted tenancies that had reverted to the lord, or parcels of large estates (Meierhöfe) whose holders subleased to small peasants. The fixed-rent system predominated, and leases often lasted six years—two cycles of the agrarian three-year rotation.

In the Lake Geneva region, especially around Lausanne, the proportion of leased land could reach a third of the agricultural area, generally under long-term contracts at fixed rent. The land in question consisted of fields (on large estates called mas), vineyards, and gardens belonging to burghers of Lausanne, Bernese patricians, or Genevan bankers. Despite the modest rents required (around 2 percent of the capital), most tenants in the region could not have lived without additional income. In the Central Alps, the agricultural lease was an important agrarian base in the 18th century, including for wealthy families such as the Stockalper and Sprecher families.

In southern Ticino, the situation was distinctive. In the 18th century, in the regions of Lugano and the Mendrisiotto, a large number of masserie (large mixed-farming estates) were operated under sharecropping arrangements, while smaller plots—fields, meadows, and vineyards—were leased for a fixed rent in money and in kind. Alongside the great landowners, intermediate tenants from urban merchant and artisan circles appeared at the end of the 18th century and in turn subleased to others. This "intermediate" leasing system worsened the situation of ordinary cultivators by imposing new obligations and rent increases, while increasing the number of small tenants called pigionanti.

Various regalian rights (customs, salt, the post, mines, and quarries) as well as certain artisanal and proto-industrial establishments were also leased.

== 19th and 20th centuries ==
In the 19th century, the term lease imposed itself at the expense of the perpetual lease, and sharecropping, still practiced in southern and western Switzerland, declined sharply in the 20th century. Compared to landed property, the agricultural lease played a modest role in the 19th and early 20th centuries despite an increase in the proportion of agricultural land covered. Direct cultivation dominated in all cantons except Basel-Stadt, Glarus, and Neuchâtel (the latter explained by the extent of urban-burgher landholdings). Around 1900, 7 to 8 percent of independent farmers were tenants. Leased land represented 16.6 percent of agricultural area in 1905, but the proportion grew in the 20th century, especially after 1945: from 22 percent in 1939 to 37 percent around 1975, and to 45 percent in 1996. At the same time, cantonal differences diminished, as the lease developed more in the regions of northern and eastern Switzerland where it was still rare around 1900.

A similar evolution occurred in the structure of farms. Until the mid-1960s, farms taking no land on lease were the most numerous. They were overtaken in 1975 by mixed forms combining ownership and lease. Leased land grew by about 150,000 hectares between 1939 and 1980, but this often consisted of parcels rented by farmers who were thereby enlarging the holdings they owned (the strong increase in average farm size since 1945 was achieved chiefly through this channel). By the mid-1980s, the share of farms leasing all the land they cultivated reached 13 percent, or 17 percent including cases where leasing predominated (including farms leased within a family to a descendant who generally went on to inherit them). Very little leased land still belonged to the urban bourgeoisie. By contrast, many heirs from farming families who had given up agriculture preferred to lease their plots rather than sell them, helping to explain the recent increase in leased area.

=== Legal framework ===
The agricultural lease is the subject of articles 275 to 304 of the Swiss Code of Obligations; the rules are relatively flexible, leaving the parties considerable freedom, with no prescribed contract form. As difficulties could arise on the termination of orally concluded leases, the Swiss Farmers' Union (USP) issued in 1920 a standard agricultural lease form valid throughout Switzerland.

The long agricultural crisis of the interwar period also affected tenants, who increasingly had to accept leases concluded for a single year. Efforts on their behalf bore their first fruits in 1933. The federal decree of April 1933 "establishing temporary legal measures for the protection of farmers in distress" allowed non-indebted tenants who had fallen behind in rent payments to benefit from a six-month period before eviction, instead of the sixty days provided for in article 282 of the Code of Obligations. These provisions were broadened in 1934, when the Confederation received the authority to lower excessive rents and to extend leases that had reached their term or were terminable.

During the Second World War, protective measures were strengthened in the name of economic supply of the country: first, tenants liable for military service could secure the extension of their lease; the minimum duration of leases was then raised to five years, with restrictions on termination introduced later. After the war, these provisions were in part abolished and in part incorporated into ordinary legislation (the federal law of 1940, in force from 1947, on the deindebtment of agricultural holdings; the federal law of 1951 on the preservation of rural landed property; the federal law of 1960 on the control of agricultural rents), and were summarized in the federal law of 1972 amending rural civil law. The federal law of 1985 on the agricultural lease finally improved tenant protection by extending the duration of leases for entire farms from six to nine years at first conclusion, and from three to six years for renewals. To prevent the fragmentation of agricultural land, the parcel-wise leasing of an entire farm was made subject to cantonal authorization. The law also introduced a balanced calculation and more effective control of rents, and strengthened the role of the cantons in issuing implementing laws and ordinances.

=== Tenants as a social group ===
In the 19th and 20th centuries, the agricultural lease often took place within a single family at the change of generations. In addition, for many farmers' sons—and a few domestic workers—who could not take over the paternal farm, recourse to a temporary lease provided a way of entering or remaining in the "peasant estate" as a social status. The great majority of tenants considered themselves full peasants. Nevertheless, cantonal tenants' associations were founded in the 1930s within the cantonal farmers' unions of Bern (1933), Lucerne, Fribourg, Vaud, Solothurn, and Aargau, chiefly to press the cantonal authorities to apply the protective measures. The eastern Swiss Tenants' Union was founded somewhat later. In 1959, the Swiss Tenants' Association was created, succeeding a working group bringing together the cantonal organizations.

== Bibliography ==
=== Middle Ages and early modern period ===
- A. Radeff, Lausanne et ses campagnes au 17e siècle, 1980, especially pp. 167–191.
- Handwörterbuch zur deutschen Rechtsgeschichte (HRG), vol. 3, cols. 1396–1400.
- S. Guzzi, Agricoltura e società nel Mendrisiotto del Settecento, 1990, especially pp. 77–114.
- R. Sablonier, "Innerschweizer Gesellschaft im 14. Jahrhundert", in Innerschweiz und frühe Eidgenossenschaft, vol. 2, 1990.
- A. Zangger, Grundherrschaft und Bauern, 1991, especially pp. 375–376.
- Lexikon des Mittelalters (LexMA), vol. 6, cols. 1607–1609.

=== 19th and 20th centuries ===
- E. Aebi, "Der Pächterstand und seine Stellung in der schweizerischen Landwirtschaft", in Recherches dans le domaine de l'économie agricole, 1951, pp. 369–390.
- H. Brugger, Die schweizerische Landwirtschaft 1850–1914, 1978.
- H. Brugger, Die schweizerische Landwirtschaft 1914–1980, 1985.

== See also ==
- Swiss Code of Obligations
- Agriculture in Switzerland
- Tenant farmer
- Sharecropping
- Lease
- Land tenure
