= Inheritance law in Switzerland =

In Swiss law, inheritance law is that part of private law under which the rights and obligations of a deceased person pass to one or more natural or juridical persons. As most of these rights and obligations are pecuniary in nature, the main purpose of inheritance law is to regulate the fate of a person's assets on death. Inheritance law in Switzerland is governed by the Swiss Civil Code (articles 457 to 640).

The deceased is called de cujus (from the Latin adage is de cujus successione agitur): the person whose estate is being dealt with (in German Erblasser). Those who receive the property are called successors, heirs or legatees, depending on their position in the de cujus succession.

== History ==
The first traces of inheritance law in Switzerland date back to the 11th century.

== Inheritance rights ==
Inheritance rights designate, on the one hand, who is to receive the de cujus' estate and, on the other hand, how much the inheritance share amounts to.

=== Kinship system ===
Swiss law is organized around the kinship system. There are three of them:

- descendants (art. 457 CC);
- parents and their descendants (art. 458 CC); and,
- grandparents and their descendants (art. 459 CC).

The presence of an heir in the first kinship excludes the vocation of members of the second kinship. The absence of an heir in the first kinship and the presence of an heir in the second kinship exclude the vocation of members of the third kinship. Swiss law does not go beyond three kin. Thus, in the absence of heirs in these three kin and of a surviving spouse, the estate devolves to the State (canton of the deceased's last domicile or commune designated by cantonal legislation; art. 466 CC).

Within a kinship, division is by head (art. 457 para. 2, 458 para. 2 and 459 para. 2 CC).

From the second kinship onwards, if there is no heir in one of the paternal or maternal lines (art. 458 al. 4 CC) -- or in the grandparents' lines (art. 459 al. 4 CC) -- the entire estate falls to the line in which there are heirs.

=== Surviving partner ===
The surviving partner has a special place, in competition with the various relatives (art. 462 CC). In competition with descendants, he/she is entitled to half the estate (art. 462 ch. 1 CC), with parents to three quarters (art. 462 ch. 2 CC). In the absence of heirs of the second kin, he/she is entitled to the entire estate (art. 462 ch. 3 CC), thus excluding the vocation of members of the third kin.

=== Intestate and voluntary heir ===
The ab intestat vocation is the succession vocation in the absence of a will (etymology of ab intestat).

Swiss law recognizes the de cujus's power to designate persons other than his intestate heirs to succeed him, whether or not in concurrence with them. These are known as instituted heirs (art. 483 CC). This is a voluntary vocation (dependent on the will of the deceased). The institution of heirs is effected by means of a disposition mortis causa (in a will or an inheritance agreement).

=== Compulsory heir (reserve and available portion) ===
Because of specific ties with the deceased (close family ties), certain heirs have a more specific right to inherit. This is known as the compulsory heir. Inheritance law grants them a share of the estate that the deceased cannot dispose of.

The corollary of the reserve is the available portion (art. 470 CC). This is the portion of the estate which the deceased is free to distribute.

Since January 1, 2023, the reserve is half of the inheritance tax (art. 471 CC).

Reserved heirs include descendants and the surviving spouse (art. 470). The revision of inheritance law which came into force on January 1, 2023 abolished the reserved right of parents.

=== Share of inheritance ===
All heirs share equally in the estate of the deceased. Thus, children succeed per head (art. 457 para. 2 CC).

In the absence of a disposition mortis causa, several situations can be distinguished:

- The cujus leaves only children: they share the estate equally. E.g.: two children: each receives half.
- The cujus leaves a surviving spouse and children: the surviving spouse is entitled to half the estate (art. 462 ch. 1 CC), the children share the other half equally.
- The cujus leaves father and mother: each shares half the estate.
- The cujus leaves a surviving spouse and his or her father and mother: the surviving spouse is entitled to three quarters of the estate (art. 462 ch. 2 CC), the father and mother share the remaining quarter equally (i.e. one eighth of the estate each).
- etc.

These principles also apply when the deceased has disposed of all or part of his estate by reason of death. Intestate vocation always applies subsidiarily to voluntary vocation, insofar as it respects reservatory vocation.

== Assets of the estate ==
A distinction is made between:

- The estate to be divided: all the property owned by the deceased at the time of his death, to be shared by the heirs according to the will of the deceased, and subsidiarily according to the law.
- The mass for calculating the reserves and the available portion: to take account of certain gifts made by the de cujus shortly before his death which could prejudice the reserves of the heirs with the right to reserve, inheritance law prescribes that these gifts be added to the mass to be shared. This is known as reunification. If it turns out that the reserves have been prejudiced, the heirs with the right to reduce the amount (art. 522 CC).

== Bibliography ==
- Paul Piotet, Droit successoral, Traité de droit privé suisse, T. IV, Fribourg, Éditions universitaire, 1975 (2nd ed. en 1988 with a few minor modifications).
- Steinauer, Paul-Henri (2015) [2006]. Le droit des successions (in French). Berne: Stämpfli. ISBN 978-3-7272-0728-0.
- Stefan Wolf/Stephanie Hrubesch-Millauer, Schweizerisches Erbrecht, Berne, Stämpfli, 2020, 2^{e} éd., 688 p.
