= Swiss Association of Art Historians =

Academic society founded in 1976

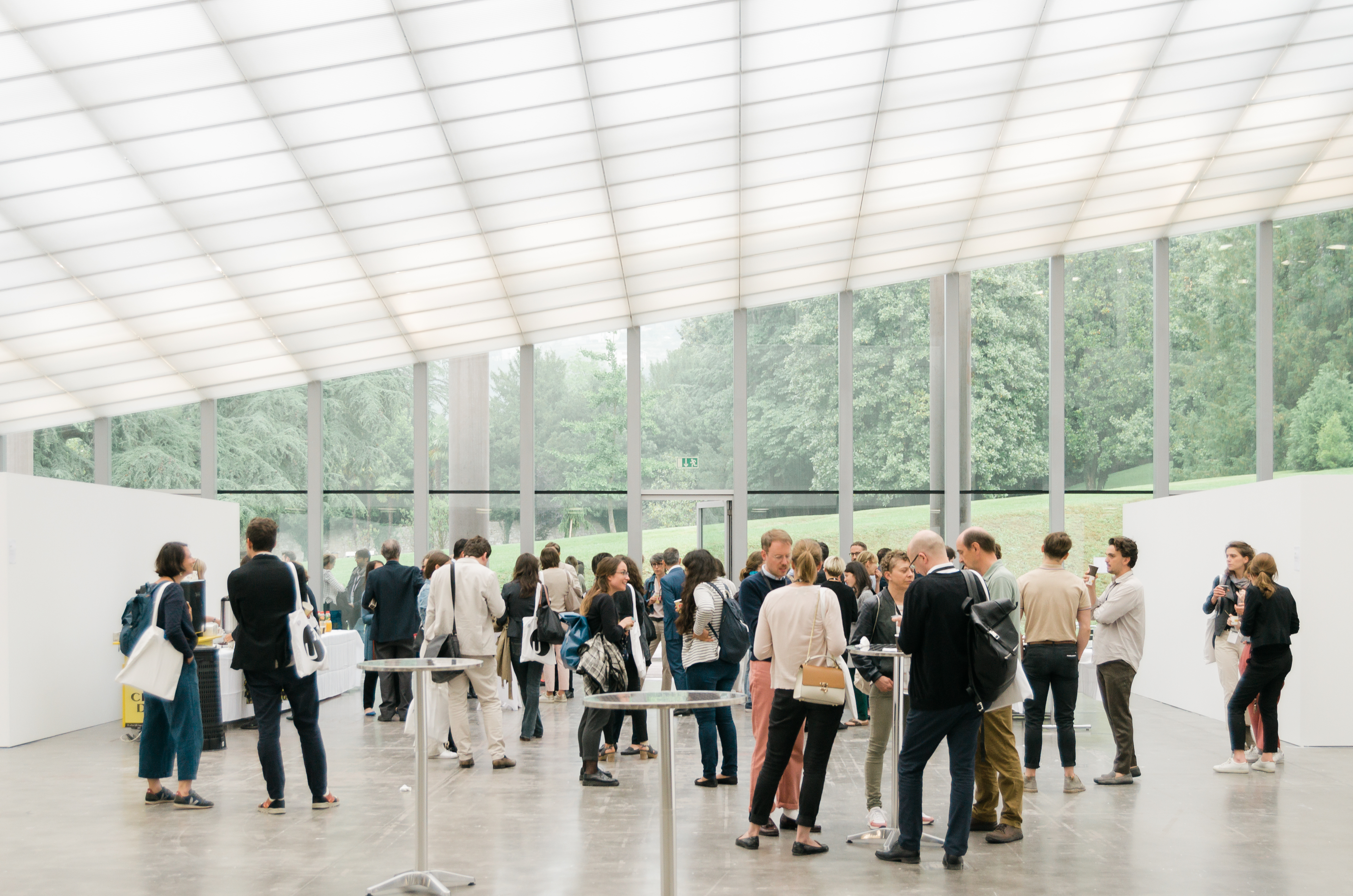
2019 VKKS Academic Congress in Mendrisio

The Swiss Association of Art Historians (German: Vereinigung der Kunsthistorikerinnen und Kunsthistoriker in der Schweiz) is an interest group founded in 1976 and based in Berne. As a professional association, it represents and promotes the interests of its members in the diverse fields of art history and visual culture.

== Tasks and goals ==
The goal of the VKKS is to cultivate and promote art history as an academic and scholarly discipline in Switzerland. This includes organizing meetings and conferences, as well as providing a wide range of specialist services and conducts research on the profession. Supporting and encouraging young scholars has been one of the Association's basic missions ever since it was founded.

With the support of the Alfred Richterich Foundation in Laufen (Switzerland), the Association organizes an Early Career Award in Art Studies, with "Junior" and "Senior" categories. In 2020, the VKKS launched a mentoring programme (with the pilot phase continuing until 2023). En 2020, l'ASHHA a lancé un programme de mentorat (phase pilote jusqu'en 2023).

== History ==
Florens Deuchler, the Association's first president, initiated the founding of the Association on 4 December 1976 in Geneva. While in its early years the Association regarded scholarly exchange as its core task, from the 1980s onwards it became increasingly involved in the preservation of cultural heritage, and from the 1990s onwards began to participate more in debates over cultural policy – on issues of remuneration, for example. In 1994, the Association's General Assembly decided to extend the original name, Vereinigung der Kunsthistoriker in der Schweiz (VKS), to include the term "Kunsthistorikerinnen" (female art historians) for reasons of gender parity.

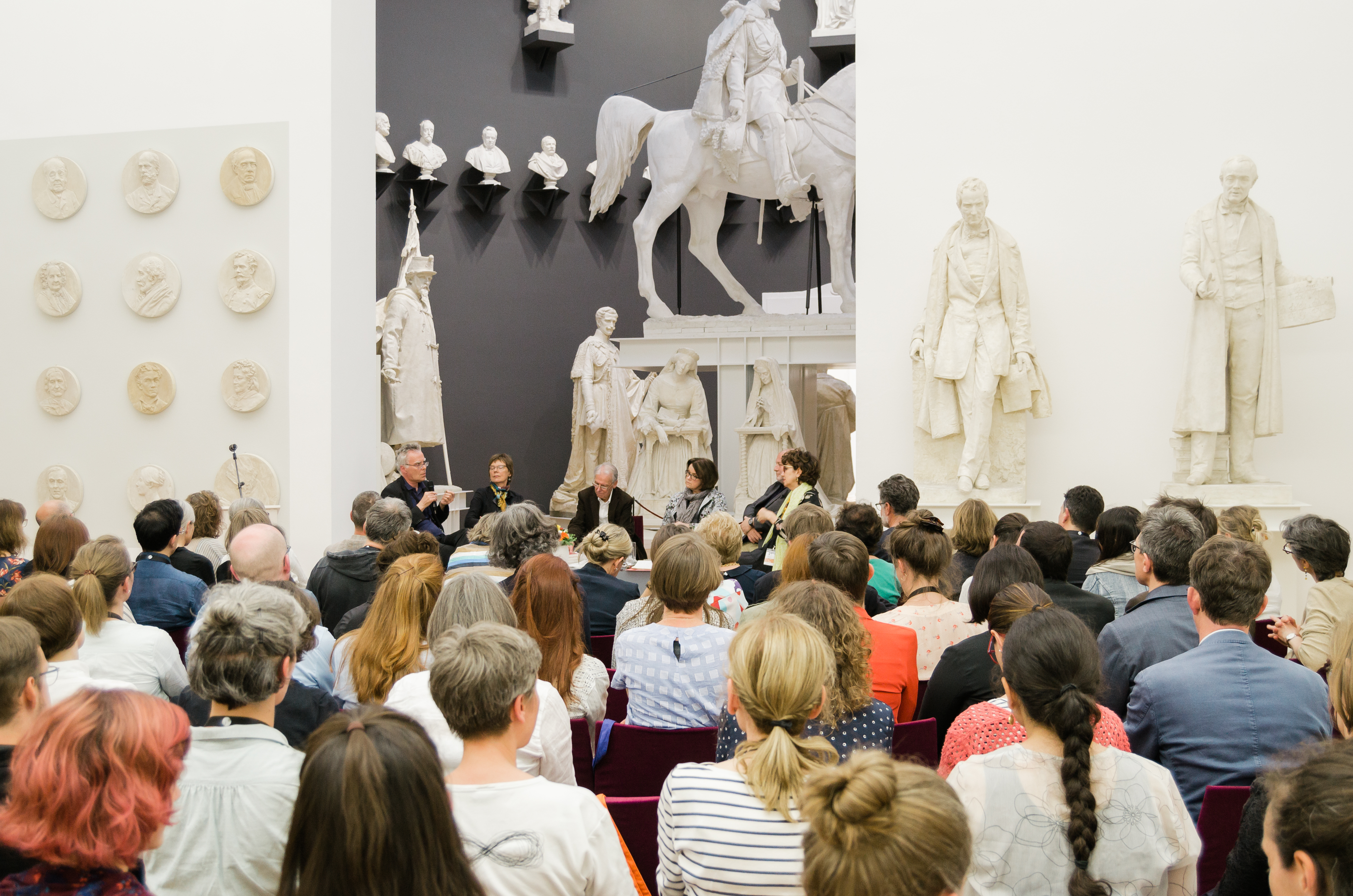
2019 VKKS Academic Congress in Mendrisio

Since its foundation, the VKKS has maintained contacts with other specialist groups in Switzerland and abroad. In 1981, it participated in the founding of Switzerland's national committee for the Comité International d'Histoire de l'Art (CIHA). In 1982, the Association was admitted to the Swiss Humanities Association (now the Swiss Academy of Humanities and Social Sciences / Schweizerische Akademie der Geistes- und Sozialwissenschaften, SAGW | ASSH). Since then, the SAGW has been the most important supporting organization for the VKKS. Continuous growth in membership – from 131 members in 1979 to 400 in 1993 – has at times required the separation of organizational areas. In 2010, the VKKS, by then counting 1000 members, organized the "First Swiss Congress for Art History" in Bern, as a forum for current research questions. The Congress has since been held at regular three-year intervals, at the universities in Lausanne (2013), Basel (2016), and Mendrisio (2019). The venue for the 5th Swiss Congress for Art History in 2022 is the University of Zurich. Alongside the annual conferences on specific topics, which have been held since 1977, the VKKS uses these three-day specialist Congresses to promote national and international networking within and beyond the boundaries of the discipline. The Congress has welcomed a guest country at each meeting since 2019.

Since 2014, the head office of the VKKS has been located in the premises of the Swiss Art History Association (Gesellschaft für Schweizerische Kunstgeschichte, GSK | SHAS | SSAS) in Pavillonweg in Bern. In 2022, the VKKS had 1670 members.

== Organization ==
The Swiss Association of Art Historians is an association as defined under Article 60ff of the Swiss Civil Code. The organisational entities of the professional association are the General Assembly of the members; the Board of Directors, represented by a committee of at least seven members; the head office; and the auditing body.

Following Florens Deuchler (1976–1980), Oskar Bätschmann (1980–1986), Marcel Baumgartner (1986–1991), Monica Stucky (1991–1993), Luc Boissonnas (1993–2002), Barbara Nägeli (2002–2008), Peter J. Schneemann (2008–2011), Andreas Münch (2011–2014) Jan Blanc (2014–2018) and Marianne Burki (2018–2023) have served as Presidents of the VKKS. Régine Bonnefoit has chaired the association since 2023.

== Collaborations ==
In the Swiss cultural sector, the VKKS as a professional association is in close contact and exchanges information with professional organizations and museums in all of Switzerland's language regions. It collaborates closely with Articulations – the Swiss Association of Young Art Historians and with the Swiss Institute of Art Studies (Schweizerisches Institut für Kunstwissenschaft, SIK-ISEA). Other collaborating partners include institutes of art history at Swiss universities. In addition, regular events are organized with art colleges in Switzerland, the Swiss Society for Art History (Gesellschaft für Kunstgeschichte, GSK), the International Association of Art Critics (Association Internationale des Critiques d'Art, AICA), working groups in the fields of historic monument conservation and restoration, and with the Comité International d'Histoire de l'Art (CIHA). The VKKS is a member of the National Information Centre on Cultural Heritage (Nationale Informationsstelle zum Kulturerbe, NIKE).
