= Equalization payments in Switzerland =

Redistribution of resources between Cantons and municipalities

Equalization payments in Switzerland are mechanisms to redistribute financial resources both between the Confederation and cantons, and between cantons and their municipalities.

In 2023, national equalization payments represent 0.7% of the Swiss GDP.

== National equalization ==
National equalization is governed by the federal government. It aims to support cantons that are worse off due to resources or costs (geographic-topographic and socio-demographic differences). This equalisation is intended to strengthen cantonal financial autonomy and reduce the differences in the tax burden between the cantons.

The payments are funded both by the Confederations (two thirds) and by the cantons (one third). In 2023, equalisation of resources represents 78% of payments, and equalisation of costs 16%. The remaining 6% are due to transitionary instruments that were introduced to ease the impact of legislative changes.

=== Equalisation of resources ===
Resource equalisation aims to ensure that each canton has sufficient financial resources to fulfil its tasks. The economic capacity of a canton is measured by its resource potential, calculated based on its taxable income, wealth of its residents, and the taxable earnings of its juridical persons.

A resource index is calculated for each canton by dividing its per capita resource potential by the Swiss average. Cantons with a resource index above 100 points have high resource potential and pay equalisation contributions. Cantons with a resource index below 100 points have low resource potential and receive equalisation contributions.

In 2023, the following 8 cantons are donors, while other cantons are takers: Obwalden, Zug, Schwyz, Nidwalden, Appenzell Innerrhoden, Basel-Stadt, Zurich, Geneva. The largest recipient canton is the canton of Valais.

=== Equalisation of costs ===
Equalisation of costs helps cantons which have to bear above-average costs over which they have no influence (in particular, mountain and central cantons). It consists of two parts:

- Compensation for costs due to socio-demographic factors, due to the structure of the population (poverty, age structure, integration of foreigners) or to their function of centre (due to city density, primarily impacting Zurich, Geneva and Basel)
- Compensation for costs due to geo-topographical factors, due to high altitude, slope of the terrain, or low population density.

In 2023, the following 6 cantons are donors, while other cantons are takers: Zug, Schwyz, Nidwalden, Basel-Stadt, Zurich, Geneva. The largest recipient canton is the canton of Valais.

=== Legal basis ===
Federal Act on Financial Equalization and Compensation of Burdens

Federal Assembly of Switzerland
- Long title: SR 613.2
- Territorial extent: Switzerland
- Enacted by: Federal Assembly of Switzerland
- Enacted: 3 October 2003
- Commenced: 1 April 2005
- Status: Current legislation

National equalization is governed by the Federal Act on Financial Equalization and Compensation of Burdens, (Note: German: Bundesgesetz über den Finanz- und Lastenausgleich, FiLaG; French: Loi fédérale sur la péréquation financière et la compensation des charges, PFCC; Italian: Legge federale concernente la perequazione finanziaria e la compensazione degli oneri, LPFC) and complemented by an implementation ordinance.

== Cantonal equalization ==
Cantonal equalization is governed by each canton. In Switzerland, municipalities have the ability to set their own tax rate. In most cantons, fiscal equalisation is intended to support municipalities with weaker taxation by ensuring balanced conditions in the tax burden of the municipalities (e.g. art. 136 of the Solothurn Cantonal Constitution).
