= Swiss Code of Obligations =

Portion of the Swiss Civil Code that regulates contract law and corporations

- Ratified: 30 March 1911
- Date effective: 1 January 1912 (current version as of 1 April 2020)
- Location: SR220
- Author(s): Walther Munzinger, Heinrich Fick
- Purpose: Regulates contract law and corporations

The Swiss Code of Obligations (SR/RS 22, German: Obligationenrecht; French: Code des obligations; Italian: Diritto delle obbligazioni; Romansh: Dretg d'obligaziuns), the 5th part of the Swiss civil code, is a federal law that regulates contract law and joint-stock companies (Aktiengesellschaft or SA). It was first adopted in 1911 (effective since 1 January 1912).

The code of obligations is a portion of the private law (SR/RS 2) of the internal Swiss law. It is also known by its full name as Federal Act on the Amendment of the Swiss Civil Code (Part Five: The Code of Obligations).

Swiss law is often used to regulate international contracts, as it is deemed neutral with respect to the parties.

== History ==
In Switzerland, private law was originally left to the individual Swiss cantons, which enacted codifications such as the Zurich Law of Obligations of 1855.

In 1864, the Bernese jurist Walther Munzinger was assigned a task to draft a unified code of obligations. This early project came to nothing, as it was not yet considered to fall under federal jurisdiction. Four years later, the Federal Council agreed to the unification of the law of obligations, and Munzinger was put in charge of the effort. After Munzinger's death in 1873, the project fell to Heinrich Fick.

The earliest version of the Code of Obligations was adopted in 1881, and came into force on 1 January 1883. Munzinger, the main drafter of the 1881 Code, was influenced by the Dresdner Draft and the work of Johann Caspar Bluntschli.

The current Code of Obligations was adopted on 30 March 1911, becoming the fifth book of the Swiss Civil Code. Changes enacted in 1911 are relatively minor, mostly reflecting the influence of the German Civil Code. The Code of Obligations was drafted in a strikingly understandable style, without many instances of abstract legal terminology, so that it could be readily understood by the common population.

Company law was subsequently revised in 1938, and the law regulating contracts of employment in 1972. The Code was revised in 2011 so that, moving forward, requirements for bookkeeping and accounting would be based on a company’s financial size rather than its legal form.

== Contents ==
The Code of Obligations includes five divisions. The Code of Obligations is part of the Civil Code, but its provisions are numbered individually.

=== General Provisions (arts. 1-183) ===
Includes general contract law, tort law, unjust enrichment.

- Principle of freedom of contract;
- Contract formation;
- Interpreting contracts;
- Nullity of a contract: impossibility, unlawfulness, immorality, non-respect of the required form;
- Defeasibility of a contract: unfair advantage, error, fraud, duress;
- Non-commercial agency;
- Breach of contract;
- Quasi-contractual obligations;
- Obligations in tort;
- Restitution of an unjust enrichment;
- Limitation periods.

=== Types of Contractual Relationship (184–551) ===
Includes specific contracts, including the purchase contract (184–236), employment contract (363–379), mandate contract (394–406).

- sale and exchange (184–238);
  - sale of movable property (187–215);
  - sale of immovable property (216–221);
- gifts (239–252);
- rental (253–304);
- loan (305–318);
  - loan for use (commodatum) (305–311);
  - loan for consummation (mutuum) (312–318);
- employment contracts (319–362);
- hire of services (363–379);
- publishing contract (380–393);
- mandate (394–418);
- negotiorum gestio (419–424);
- commission contract (425–439);
- contract of carriage (440–457);
- power of attorney / commercial agency (458–465);
- delegation (466–471);
- deposit (472–491);
- suretyship (492–512);
- gambling and betting (513–515);
- life annuity contract and lifetime maintenance agreement (516–529);
- simple partnership (530–551).

=== Commercial Enterprises and the Cooperative (552–926) ===
Corporate law.

Types of business associations:

- sole proprietorship;
- partnerships:
  - general partnership (552–593);
  - limited partnership (594–619);
- companies:
  - public limited company (plc. or German: AG, French/Italian: SA; 620-763);
  - partnership limited by shares (764–771);
  - private limited company (Ltd. or German: GmbH, French: S.á.r.l, Italian: S.a.g.l.; 772-827);
  - cooperative (828–926).

=== The Companies Registry, trade names and business accounting (927–964) ===
- Trade names (company styles) (944–956);
- Business accounting and financial reporting (957–963).

=== Negotiable Securities (965–1186) ===
Commercial papers.

- registered securities (974–977);
- bearer securities (978–989);
- bills and notes (990–1099);
- cheque (1100–1144);
- bill-like securities and other instruments to order (1145–1152);
- document of title of goods (1153–1155);
- bonds (1156–1186);

== Principles and influences ==
The contract law of the Code of Obligations is based on civil-law traditions, and it was originally a compromise between the German Pandectist school and the Code Napoleon of 1804. However, since its original enactment, the Code has been modified drawing from either German jurisprudence or Anglo-American commercial law.

Swiss contract law discriminates between general and special contract rules. The general rules are based on legal doctrine current in the 17th and 18th centuries, whereas special rules tend to be based on more modern legal theories. It is divided into a general part, which applies to all contracts, and a special part, which applies to specific types of contracts, such as sales of goods or loans.

The Code is governed by the principle of the freedom to contract, which includes freedom as to the content and type of the contract, and the freedom of the parties to enter into agreements which are not governed by the special part of the Code.

One major difference compared to contract law in common-law jurisdictions is the lack of a requirement of consideration. The concept of frustration of purpose is also not part of the Swiss legal tradition.

The first version of the Swiss Code of Obligations influenced parts of the German Civil Code, the Taiwanese Civil Code (Book II), the South Korean Civil Code (Part III) and the Thai Civil Code (Book II). The Turkish Civil Code, adopted in 1926, is based on the Swiss Civil Code, which also includes the Code of Obligations.

== See also ==
- Swiss law
- Swiss Civil Code
- Swiss Criminal Code
- Swiss Alliance of Consumer Organisations
