= Swiss Criminal Code =

Federal Assembly of Switzerland
- Long title: German: Strafgesetzbuch (StGB), French: Code pénal suisse (CP), Italian: Codice penale svizzero (CP), Romansh: Cudesch penal svizzer
- Territorial extent: Switzerland
- Enacted by: Federal Assembly of Switzerland
- Enacted: 20 December 1937
- Commenced: 01 January 1942

Amended by
- 01 March 2018

Related legislation
- Swiss Military Criminal Code
- Status: Current legislation

The Swiss Criminal Code (SR/RS 311, German: Strafgesetzbuch (StGB), French: Code pénal suisse (CP), Italian: Codice penale svizzero (CP), Romansh: Cudesch penal svizzer) is a portion of the third part (SR/RS 3) of the internal Swiss law ("Private law - Administration of civil justice - Enforcement") that regulates the criminal code in Switzerland. The original version was created on 21 December 1937. It entered into force on 1 January 1942. Previously, criminal law had been a cantonal competency.

== History ==
The Swiss Criminal Code was based on an initial draft by Carl Stooss in 1893. He proposed one of the first criminal codes that included both punishment and preemptive safeguard measures. The original code was approved by the people on 3 July 1938 in a referendum, with 358,438 voting in favor to 312,030 voting against. With its entry into force on 1 January 1942, all cantonal legislation that contradicted the new Criminal Code was abolished. This especially included the civilian death penalty, which was still in force in some cantons, as well as the criminalization of gay sex. Moreover, the competences for substantive law were largely transferred from the cantons to the Confederation. The cantons retained only the competence in procedural law and cantonal tax legislation and violations.

The code has been revised numerous times since 1942. The most recent significant revision took effect in 2007 and introduced the possibility to convert short prison sentences (less than one year) into fines, calculated using a day-rate based on the "personal and economic situation of the convict at the time of the verdict", with an upper limit set at CHF 3000 per day of the sentence. Practically all prison sentences shorter than one year have since been converted into fines, conditional sentences (parole) to conditional fines. This has caused controversy because the result is that lighter offences not punishable by imprisonment always result in unconditional fines, while more severe offences now often result in conditional fines that do not need to be paid at all. The Federal Council in October 2010 announced its intention to revert to the earlier system, and all large parties expressed at least partial support.

== Structure ==
=== General provisions (articles 1–110 of the Criminal Code) ===
First Book: The first book lays down general provisions which apply to the following books ("General"). The first book contains provisions on:

- Scope
- Requirements of the offense (crimes and offenses, intent and negligence, lawful acts and blame, attempt, participation, criminality of the media agency relationships)
- Criminal complaints
- Sanctions and measures (fines, community service, imprisonment, conditional and partial probation, sentencing, decriminalization or termination of proceedings, therapeutic measures and custody, other measures)
- Execution of Penalties
- Probation, transfers and voluntary social care
- Limitation
- Control of the enterprise
- Rules in violations
- Definitions

=== Specific provisions (articles 111–332 of the Penal Code) ===
Second Book: This specifies what actions are punishable. The second book is divided into 20 titles that summarize the various crimes ("Special Section"):

- Criminal acts against physical integrity
- Criminal acts against property
- Criminal acts against honour and privacy
- Criminal acts and against freedom
- Criminal acts against sexual integrity
  - Art. 189: Sexual assault. Sexual acts committed with the use of coercion, threats, violence psychological pressure or by disabling somebody's capability to defend oneself.
  - Art. 190: Rape. Same as sexual assault, but the victim is female, and the sexual act must be a coitus or a coitus-like act.
  - Art. 191: Defilement. Sexual acts with a defenseless person, or one incapable of judgment.
- Criminal acts against the family
- Criminal acts against the community
- Criminal acts against public health
- Criminal acts against public transport
- Counterfeiting of currency, postage stamps, official marks, weights and measures
- Forgery
- Criminal acts and crimes against the peace
- Criminal acts against the interests of the international community
- Criminal acts against the state and national defence
- Criminal acts against the functioning of democracy
- Insubmission to a legitimate public authority
- Disruption of foreign relations
- Criminal acts against the administration of justice
- Criminal acts against official and professional duty
- Corruption
- Violations of civil service legislation

=== Introduction and application of the law (articles 333–392 of the Penal Code) ===
Third Book: The third book mainly covers the powers of courts and defines procedural requirements.

== See also ==
- Swiss law
- Swiss Civil Code
- Swiss Code of Obligations
- Crime in Switzerland
- Federal act (Switzerland)
- Military justice in Switzerland

== Literature ==
Zurich

- Andreas Donatsch, Brigitte Tag: Strafrecht I, Verbrechenslehre – 9. Auflage; Zürich/Basel/Genf 2013
- Daniel Jositsch, Gian Ege, Christian Schwarzenegger: Strafrecht II, Strafen und Massnahmen – 9. Auflage; Zürich/Basel/Genf 2018
- Andreas Donatsch: Strafrecht III, Delikte gegen den Einzelnen – 11. Auflage; Zürich/Basel/Genf 2018
- Andreas Donatsch, Marc Thommen, Wolfgang Wohlers: Strafrecht IV, Delikte gegen die Allgemeinheit – 5. Auflage; Zürich/Basel/Genf 2017

Günther Stratenwerth:

- Günter Stratenwerth: Schweizerisches Strafrecht, Allgemeiner Teil: Die Straftat - 4. Auflage, Bern 2011, ISBN 978-3-7272-8667-4
- Günter Stratenwerth: Schweizerisches Strafrecht, Allgemeiner Teil II: Strafen und Massnahmen - 2. Auflage; Bern 2006, ISBN 978-3-7272-0799-0
- Günter Stratenwerth, Guido Jenny, Felix Bommer: Schweizerisches Strafrecht, Besonderer Teil I: Straftaten gegen Individualinteressen – 7. Auflage, Bern 2010, ISBN 978-3-7272-8658-2
- Günter Stratenwerth, Felix Bommer: Schweizerisches Strafrecht, Besonderer Teil II: Straftaten gegen Gemeininteressen – 7. Auflage, Bern 2013, ISBN 978-3-7272-8684-1
