= Official Compilation of Federal Legislation =

Government gazette of Switzerland

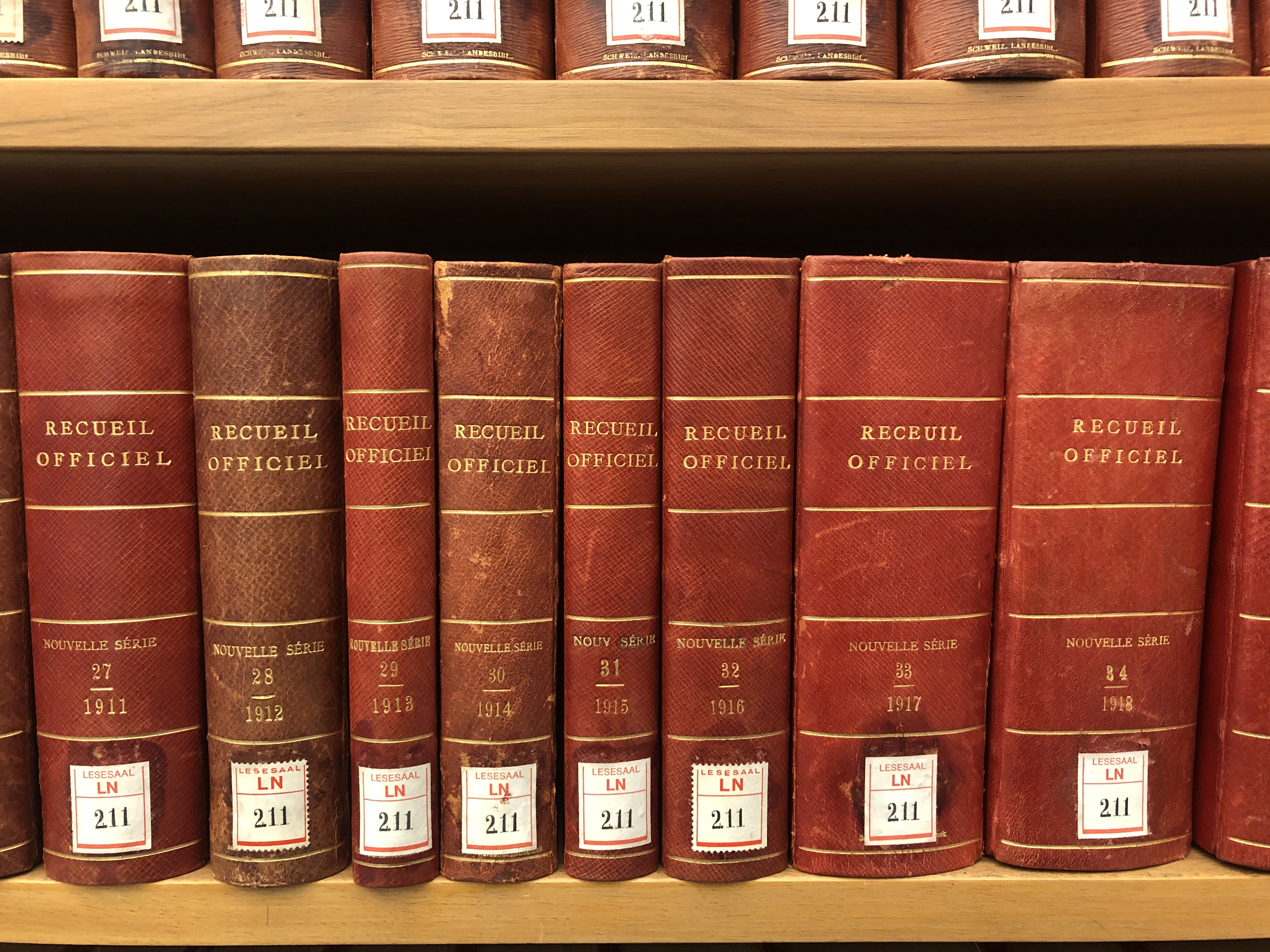
Official Compilation (French version), 1911 to 1918, at the Swiss National Library, in Berne

The Official Compilation of Federal Legislation (AS) (German: Amtliche Sammlung des Bundesrechts, AS; French: Recueil officiel du droit fédéral, RO; Italian: Raccolta ufficiale delle leggi federali, RU) is the federal government gazette of Switzerland. All Swiss federal laws and ordinances, as well as amendments to them, enter into force by chronological publication in the AS/RO/RU.

Federal laws only become legally binding when published in the Official Compilation, as opposed to the Systematic Compilation of Federal Legislation, which by itself does not confer force of law (art. 8 PublA).

It is issued in the three official languages of Switzerland: German, French and Italian, and regulated by the Publications Act. All three language editions are equally valid. It is published by the Federal Chancellery of Switzerland in the form of weekly supplements to loose leaf binders. Since 1999, they have been also made available on the Internet in PDF format.

== Contents ==
The Official Compendium of Federal Law publishes in principle all federal legislation:

- The Enactments of the Confederation (art. 2 PublA), i.e. the Federal Constitution, federal laws, ordinances of the Federal Assembly, ordinances of the Federal Council, certain federal decrees and other normative acts issued by federal authorities as well as by organizations or persons under public or private law who are entrusted with administrative tasks but who are not strictly speaking part of the federal administration.
- International treaties and international law decrees (art. 3 PublA), mainly international treaties and decisions of international and supranational organizations that are binding on Switzerland and contain legal rules.
- Agreements between the Confederation and the cantons and between cantons (art. 4 PublA)

== Organs ==
The Official Publications Centre (OPC) of the Federal Chancellery publishes this collection as and when texts are promulgated (art. 1 para. 1 of the Ordinance on Official Publications).

== Modalities of publication ==
Texts are published at least five days before they come into force (ordinary publication; art. 7 al. 1 PublA). If this is not possible due to urgency or extraordinary circumstances, a text can be published beforehand in another way (extraordinary publication; art. 7 al. 3 PublA). These texts are for example federal laws that have been declared urgent and that must enter into force immediately (art. 165 of the Swiss constitution). All these acts are published in the Systematic Compilation of Federal Legislation under the number "105 Emergency Legislation".

=== Exceptions ===
Exceptionally, publication may be waived for acts and international treaties that must be kept secret for reasons of national security (art. 8 PublA), or that are not suitable for AS, for example when they concern only a small number of people or are technical in nature (art. 5 PublA). In the latter case, the publication in the AS is replaced by a simple reference to the organ in which the publication took place or from which the text can be ordered (art. 1 and art. 2 PublA).

For some years now, although not provided for by law, practice has also imposed this system of simple reference for texts of European law published in the Official Journal of the European Union (OJEU) and which are binding on Switzerland by virtue of international treaties or following their incorporation into federal legislation.

== History ==
The Official Compilation of Federal Laws and Ordinances of the Swiss Confederation (French: Recueil officiel des lois et ordonnances fédérales de la Confédération suisse) was published irregularly from 1848 to 1904, with a total of 30 volumes.

From 1904 to 1987, it was published weekly as a supplement to the Federal Gazette under the title Compilation of Federal Laws (French: Recueil des lois fédérales), with a total of 84 volumes.

From 1988 to 2005, it was published under the title Official Compilation of Federal Laws (French: Recueil des lois fédérales). Since 2005, its official designation has been Official Compilation of Federal Legislation (French: Recueil officiel du droit fédéral).

The AS has been available on the Internet since 1998. Issues prior to that date are digitized and available on the website of the Swiss Federal Archives. Since 1 January 2016, only the electronic versions of the AS and the Federal Gazette have legally binding effect.

== See also ==
- Federal Gazette
- Federal Register
- Law of Switzerland
- Official Journal of the European Union
- Publications Act (Switzerland)
- Systematic Compilation of Federal Legislation
- United States Statutes at Large
