= Federal Gazette (Switzerland) =

Swiss federal public journal

German: Bundesblatt French: Feuille fédérale Italian: Foglio federale Romansh: Fegl uffizial federal
- The Bundesblatt on 7 July 1883
- Type: Weekly official journal
- Publisher: Federal Chancellery of Switzerland
- Founded: 1849; 177 years ago
- Language: German; French; Italian
- Website: www.fedlex.admin.ch

The Federal Gazette (German: Bundesblatt, BBl; French: Feuille fédérale, FF; Italian: Foglio federale, FF; Romansh: Fegl uffizial federal, FF) is the official gazette of the federal government of Switzerland.

It includes:

- reports of the Swiss Federal Council to the Swiss Federal Assembly, most notably the drafts of proposed laws with usually extensive explanations,
- laws enacted by Parliament that are subject to an obligatory or facultative popular referendum,
- reports and notifications by the Federal Council, parliamentary committees and various government agencies.

It is issued weekly in the three official languages of Switzerland: German, French and Italian. All three language editions are equally valid. It is published by the Federal Chancellery of Switzerland. Its publication is regulated by the Publications Act (PublA).

Since 1999, the Gazette is made available on the internet in PDF format. Since 1 January 2016, the electronic version of the Federal Gazette is deemed authentic.

== See also ==
- Law of Switzerland
- Official Compilation of Federal Legislation
- Systematic Compilation of Federal Legislation
- Federal Register
- Official Journal of the European Union
- Publications Act (Switzerland)
