= Swiss Civil Code =

Codified law ruling in Switzerland

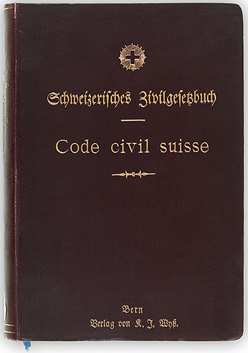
- The first edition of the Swiss Civil Code, around 1907
- Ratified: 10 December 1907
- Date effective: 1 January 1912 (current version as of 1 April 2016)
- Location: SR 210
- Author(s): Eugen Huber, Virgile Rossel, Brenno Bertoni
- Purpose: Regulates relationship between individuals

The Swiss Civil Code (SR/RS 210, German: Schweizerisches Zivilgesetzbuch (ZGB); French: Code civil suisse (CC); Italian: Codice civile svizzero (CC); Romansh: Cudesch civil svizzer) is a portion of the second part (SR/RS 2) of the internal Swiss law ("Private law - Administration of civil justice - Enforcement") that regulates the codified law ruling in Switzerland and relationship between individuals. It was first adopted in 1907 (effective since 1 January 1912).

It was largely influenced by the German civil code, and partly influenced by the French civil code, but the majority of comparative law scholars (such as K. Zweigert and Rodolfo Sacco) argue that the Swiss code derives from a distinct paradigm of civil law.

== History and influences ==
Adopted on 10 December 1907 (and is thus formally known as the Swiss Civil Code of 10 December 1907), and in force since 1912. It was created by Eugen Huber, it was subsequently translated in the two other national languages (at the time Romansh was not official) by Virgile Rossel and Brenno Bertoni for French and Italian, respectively.

The Civil code of the Republic of Turkey is a slightly modified version of the Swiss code, adopted in 1926 during Mustafa Kemal Atatürk's presidency as part of the government's progressive reforms and secularization. The Swiss code also influenced the codes of several other states, such as Peru.

In 1911, the Swiss Code of Obligations (SR 22) was adopted and considered as the fifth part of the Swiss Civil Code. It thus became the first civil code to include commercial law.

== Content ==
The Swiss Civil Code contains more than two thousands articles. Its first article states that:

^{1} The law applies according to its wording or interpretation to all legal questions for which it contains a provision.
^{2} In the absence of a provision, the court shall decide in accordance with customary law and, in the absence of customary law, in accordance with the rule that it would make as legislator.
^{3} In doing so, the court shall follow established doctrine and case law.

== See also ==
- Swiss law
- Swiss Code of Obligations
- Swiss Criminal Code
- Inheritance law in Switzerland
