= Law of Switzerland =

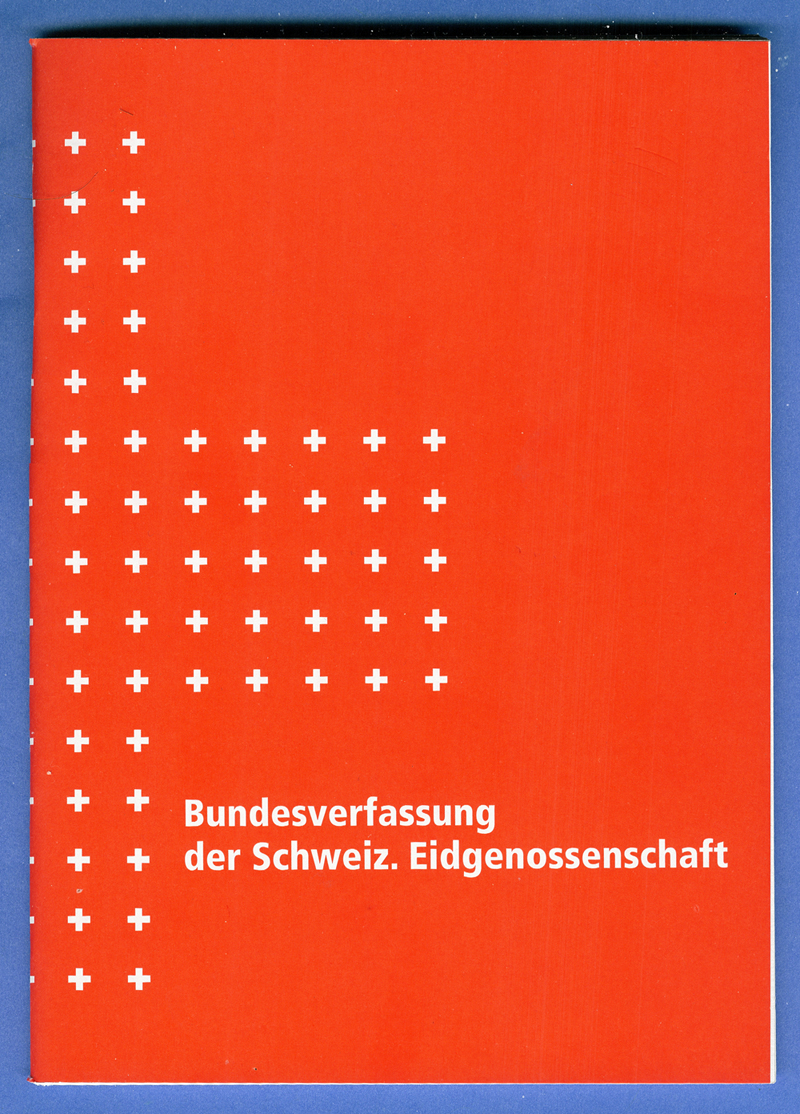
Cover of the Swiss Federal Constitution of 18 April 1999 (version in German)

Swiss law is a set of rules which constitutes the law in Switzerland.

== Structure and sources ==
There is a hierarchy of political levels which reflects the legal and constitutional character of Switzerland.

The Federal law (German: Bundesrecht, French: Droit fédéral, Italian: Diritto federale) consist of the following parts:

- International law,
- Internal law,

According to the current Federal Constitution (SR 101 Art. 1, 3) and the principle of subsidiarity (Switzerland) (SR 101 Art. 5a) and the Title 3 Confederation, Cantons and Communes (SR 101), the Cantons of Switzerland "are sovereign except to the extent that their sovereignty is limited by the Federal Constitution. They exercise all rights that are not vested in the Confederation" and "the principle of subsidiarity must be observed in the allocation and performance of state tasks".

The Internal law (German: Landesrecht, French: Droit interne, Italian: Diritto interno, Romansh: Dretg naziunal) consists of the following parts:

1. State - People - Authorities (SR 1)
2. Private law - Administration of civil justice - Enforcement (SR 2)
3. Criminal law - Administration of criminal justice - Execution of sentences (SR 3)
4. Education - Science - Culture (SR 4)
5. National defence (SR 5)
6. Finance (SR 6)
7. Public works - Energy - Transport (SR 7)
8. Health - Employment - Social security (SR 8)
9. Economy - Technical cooperation (SR 9)

Some major aspects are:

- the Swiss Federal Constitution (SR 10),
- acts of parliament ("laws") or by-laws,
- delegated legislation, regulations, or ordinances, and
- adjudication (binding decisions) by competent tribunals.

=== Publications ===
The federal government publishes legal instruments in three principal official publications:

- the Systematic Compilation (German: Systematische Sammlung des Bundesrechts (SR), French: Recueil systématique du droit fédéral (RS), Italian: Raccolta sistematica del diritto federale (RS), Romansh: Collecziun sistematica) is the official compilation of all federal laws, ordinances, international and intercantonal treaties that are in force,
- the Official Compilation of Federal Legislation (German: Amtliche Sammlung des Bundesrechts, AS; French: Recueil officiel du droit fédéral, RO; Italian: Raccolta ufficiale delle leggi federali, RU) is the federal gazette, and
- the Federal Gazette (German: Bundesblatt, BBl; French: Feuille fédérale, FF; Italian: Foglio federale, FF) publishes various official texts of the federal government.

All three publications are issued in the three official languages of Switzerland: German, French and Italian. All three language editions are equally valid. They are published by the Federal Chancellery of Switzerland in the form of weekly supplements to loose leaf binders. Since 1999, they are also made available on the Internet in PDF format (as well as HTML in the case of the SR/RS).

== Some particular laws ==
=== Civil code ===
The Swiss Civil Code (SR 21) was adopted on 10 December 1907 (Status as of 1 January 2016, SR 210) and has been in force since 1912. It was largely influenced by the German civil code, and partly influenced by the French civil code, but the majority of comparative law scholars (such as K. Zweigert and Rodolfo Sacco) argue that the Swiss code derives from a distinct paradigm of civil law.

=== Criminal law ===
The Swiss Criminal Code (SR 311) of 21 December 1937 (Status as of 1 July 2016, SR 311.0) goes back to an 1893 draft by Carl Stooss. It has been in effect since 1942.

Among the notable changes to earlier Swiss criminal law was the abolition of capital punishment in Switzerland and the legalization of homosexual acts between adults (until 1990, the age of consent for homosexual acts remained set at 20 years, compared to 16 years for heterosexual acts).

The code has been revised numerous times since 1942. The most recent revision (as of 2010), in effect since 2007, introduced the possibility to convert short prison sentences (below one year) into fines, calculated based on a daily rate which has to be established based on the "personal and economic situation of the convict at the time of the verdict", with an upper limit set at CHF 3000 per day of the sentence.

Practically all prison sentences shorter than one year have since been converted into fines, conditional sentences (parole) to conditional fines. This has generated controversy, as it results in lighter offences not punishable by imprisonment consistently leading to unconditional fines, while more serious offences often result in conditional fines that may not need to be paid at all.

The Federal Council in October 2010 announced its intention to revert to the earlier system, and all large parties expressed at least partial support.

=== Military justice ===
Military justice in Switzerland constitutes a specialized branch of the criminal justice system distinct from ordinary civilian courts, handling approximately 2,000 proceedings annually through a system established in its modern form by the Military Criminal Code of 1927. The system applies to Swiss armed forces members and certain civilians engaged with military institutions, with approximately 95 percent of cases involving strictly military offenses such as violations of the duty to serve and disciplinary infractions.

Military justice operates through independent prosecution authorities and courts organized into three linguistic regions, with enhanced procedural protections for the accused including guaranteed legal counsel and the right to be heard in one's language, distinguishing it from ordinary criminal procedure.

== See also ==
- Swiss Code of Obligations (SR 22)
- Referendum
- Swiss nationality law
- Swiss Institute of Comparative Law
- Law enforcement in Switzerland
- Notary (Switzerland)
- Jurist (Switzerland)
- Schubert practice
