= Federal act (Switzerland) =

Swiss federal act

In Switzerland, a federal act (Note: German: Bundesgesetz; French: Loi fédérale; Italian: Legge federale) is a legislative law adopted at the level of the Confederation. By default, its duration of application is unlimited. It takes precedence over cantonal and communal law (derogatory force).

== Definition ==
The Federal Constitution defines a federal law as follows:

All important provisions that establish rules of law must be enacted in the form of a federal act.

— Art. 164, para. 1, sentence 1, Cst

The ParlA uses this definition in the same terms. (Note: "The Federal Assembly shall enact in the form of a federal law all important provisions that lay down rules of law", Art. 22, para. 1, ParlA.)

=== Rule of law ===
A "rule of law" exists when an adopted provision (cumulatively):

- is of a general nature, i.e. the provision is addressed to an indeterminate number of persons or target subjects;
- is abstract in nature, i.e. the provision can be interpreted for any number of situations;
- has direct application;
- creates an obligation, confers a right or assigns powers.

=== Important provisions ===
Determining the importance of the provision is the product of a political assessment. However, the Federal Constitution states that "fundamental provisions" in the following areas are subject to mandatory federal legislation:

- the exercise of political rights;
- the restriction of constitutional rights;
- the rights and obligations of individuals;
- the status of taxpayer, the purpose of taxes and the calculation of the amount of taxes;
- the tasks and services of the Confederation;
- the obligations of the cantons in implementing and enforcing federal law;
- the organisation and procedure of the federal authorities.

=== Formal and substantive law ===
The doctrine makes a distinction between:

- law in the formal sense, i.e. acts that are adopted by parliament in the course of the legislative process and are entitled "law";
- law in the substantive sense, i.e. a general and abstract norm.

The Federal Constitution, however, uses the term "act" to refer to legal acts which are adopted in the legislative procedure and which fall within the competence of the Federal Assembly.

=== Urgent federal legislation ===
The Federal Constitution also provides for the Federal Assembly to enact so-called urgent federal laws. These are defined as follows:

A federal law whose implementation cannot be delayed may be declared urgent and enter into effect immediately by a decision of the majority of the members of each Council. Its validity must be limited in time.

— Art. 165, para. 1, Cst.

The Federal Assembly alone is competent to declare a law urgent.

== Adoption process ==
A federal law is adopted by the Federal Assembly. It therefore requires the approval of the National Council and the Council of States in the same terms.

It is subject to referendum, which means that it is subject to an optional referendum. This means that if 50,000 signatures are collected within 100 days of its official publication (in the Federal Gazette), or if eight cantons request it within the same period, the law is submitted to a vote of the people alone. (Note: And not to a vote of the people and the cantons, as is the case for a mandatory referendum, as for a revision of the Federal Constitution.) If the people accept the federal law in a vote, it comes into force; if they reject it, it does not come into force.

== Constitutionality review ==
=== History ===
==== Full amendment of the 1999 Constitution ====
In the Federal Constitutions of 1848 and 1874, the Federal Court has no power to review the constitutionality of federal laws.

In the 1999 full amendment, the draft submitted by the Federal Council contained the following provision:

In connection with an implementing act, the Federal Supreme Court examines whether a federal law or a federal decree of general application violates constitutional rights or international law.

— Art. 178, para. 1, of the 1997 draft Federal Constitution (draft C)

This proposal by the Federal Council was opposed in the National Council. During the debate, the former head of the FDJP, Christian Democrat Federal Councillor Arnold Koller, opposed the introduction of an abstract control as in Germany and France. He justifies this position by the fact that abstract control represents a continuation of politics by other means ("nur eine Fortsetzung der Politik mit anderen Mitteln"). It therefore advocates a concrete control, as provided for in the Federal Council's draft. However, this was rejected by the National Council by 87 votes to 39.

==== Studer and Müller-Hemmi Parliamentary initiatives ====
Two parliamentary initiatives were tabled after the full amendment of 1999, one in 2005 by the Aargau Evangelical National Councillor Heiner Studer, the other in 2007 by the Zurich Socialist National Councillor Vreni Müller-Hemmi. The two initiatives are dealt with in a single report by the Legal Affairs Committee of the National Council (CAJ-N), which proposes the abrogation of Article 190 of the Federal Constitution. The Federal Council is in favour of the abrogation.

During the debate on the introduction of the subject in the National Council, the German-speaking committee rapporteur, the Zurich Green Daniel Vischer, spoke of an object with a certain historical significance for Switzerland ("gewisse epochale Bedeutung für dieses Land"). By a narrow majority of 94 votes (Note: The Green and Green-Liberal groups as a whole, a majority of the Christian Democrat and Socialist groups and a minority of the Liberal-Radical group.) to 86, (Note: The SVP group as a whole, a majority of the Liberal-Radical group and a minority of the Christian Democrat and Socialist groups.) the National Council accepts the bill. However, the project did not pass the Council of States, which rejected it by 17 votes to 27.

==== Perspectives ====
Some authors consider it unlikely that a constitutional court will be introduced at federal level in the future.

=== Decisive nature of federal laws in relation to the Federal Constitution ===
The relationship between federal laws and the Federal Constitution is governed by Article 190 Cst:

The Federal Court and other authorities are required to apply federal and international law.

— Art. 190, Cst.

==== Constitutional jurisdiction at federal level ====
The consequence of this principle is that the (administrative and judicial) authorities of the cantons and the Confederation, in particular the Federal Court (FC), must apply federal laws, even if they contradict the Federal Constitution. In the words of the Federal Court, this article prohibits the above-mentioned authorities from refusing to apply the law; this prohibition also extends to any attempt to correct the law. According to the Federal Court, the courts can only invite the legislator to modify the law they consider unconstitutional. Biaggini speaks in this respect of an "immunisation" of federal laws from the federal Constitution.

Some authors consider this feature of Art. 190 Cst. to be a central issue in Swiss constitutional law, but at the same time a deficit for the rule of law. Another part of the doctrine sees this characteristic as a manifestation of the superiority of the Federal Assembly over the courts (deriving from Art. 148, para. 1, Cst. (Note: "The Federal Assembly is the supreme authority of the Confederation, subject to the rights of the people and the cantons".)). Several authors insist that the hierarchy of norms in federal law, according to which the Federal Constitution takes precedence over federal laws, is not called into question by Article 190 Cst.

==== Compatibility check ====
However, according to the consistent case law of the Federal Supreme Court, Art. 190 Cst. does not prevent the Federal Supreme Court from verifying the constitutionality of a federal law: it only prevents it from annulling or invalidating the law if it turns out to be contrary to the Federal Constitution.

== Federal law and international law ==
Switzerland has a monistic system, which means that in Swiss law, national and international law form a unity. As explained above, according to Art. 190 Cst. federal laws and international law are decisive for the courts, including the Federal Court. A majority of the doctrine agrees that the wording of Art. 190 Cst. does not contain any rule on the relationship between federal law and international law or a solution for the case where a conflict arises.

=== Interpretation in accordance with international law ===
In order to avoid a conflict, a federal law must be interpreted, as far as possible, in a manner consistent with international law, as established in the Frigerio judgment of 1968. This consistent interpretation applies in particular to the ECHR.

In Tschannen's view, such an interpretation is an obligation that originates in Art. 5 (3) and (4) (Note: "State bodies and individuals must act in good faith" (para. 3); "The Confederation and the cantons shall respect international law" (para. 4).) of the Federal Constitution, and even in the principle of good faith enshrined in the Vienna Convention on the Law of Treaties (Art. 26 (Note: "Any treaty in force is binding on the parties and must be performed by them in good faith".) and 27 (Note: "No party may invoke the provisions of its internal law as justification for its failure to perform a treaty. This rule is without prejudice to Article 46".) in particular). This view is shared by the Federal Administration.

=== The primacy of international law over federal law ===
If a federal law cannot be interpreted in a manner consistent with international law, there is a conflict between the federal law and international law.

==== Principle ====
According to the jurisprudence of the Federal Court, in the event of a conflict, international law takes precedence and the administrative and judicial authorities cannot apply federal law. This primacy, according to Tschannen, entails a de facto (if not de jure because of art. 190 Cst.) constitutional jurisdiction over federal laws (especially in the field of human rights). According to the Federal Council, this role is rather exercised by the ECtHR.

==== Exception ====
There is only one exception to the principle of primacy, established in 1973 by the Federal Court. When the Federal Assembly adopts a federal law in the knowledge that it runs counter to a pre-existing provision of international law valid for Switzerland, the Federal Court is obliged to apply it, even if it conflicts with international law (Schubert case law).

== Appendices ==
=== Legal basis ===
- Federal Constitution of the Swiss Confederation (Cst.) of April 18, 1999 (as of January 1, 2020), SR 101
- Federal Assembly Act of December 13, 2002 (as of December 2, 2019), SR 171.10

=== Messages from the Federal Council ===
- "Message of the Federal Council of November 20, 1996 on a new federal constitution". Feuille fédérale (in French). I (1): 1–653. 1997-01-14.

=== Bibliography ===
- Biaggini, Giovanni (2017). BV Kommentar : Bundesverfassung der Schweizerischen Eidgenossenschaft (in German). Zurich: Orell Füssli. ISBN 978-3-280-07320-9.
- Hangartner, Yvo; Looser, Martin E. (2014). Art. 190 (in French). in: Ehrenzeller, Bernhard; Benjamin Schindler; René J. Schweizer; Klaus A. Vallender (2014). Die schweizerische Bundesverfassung. St. Galler Kommentar (in German). Zurich. ISBN 978-3-7255-6698-3.
- Griffel, Alain (2015). § 27 Rechtsschutz, insbesondere Verfassungsgerichtsbarkeit. in: Biaggini, Giovanni; Thomas, Gächter; Andreas, Glaser (2015). Staatsrecht (in German). Zurich/Saint-Gall: Dike. ISBN 978-3-03751-739-0.
- Tschannen, Pierre (2016). Staatsrecht der Schweizerischen Eidgenossenschaft (in German). Berne: Stämpfli SA. ISBN 978-3-7272-8494-6.
  - § 8 Bundesverfassung und übriges Landesrecht (p. 148–159)
  - § 9 Landesrecht und Völkerrecht (p. 160–175)
  - § 45 Gesetzgebung (p. 577–603)

=== Federal Council reports ===
- "La relation entre droit international et droit interne. Rapport du Conseil fédéral du 5 mars 2010 en réponse au postulat 07.3764 de la Commission des affaires juridiques du Conseil des Etats du 16 octobre 2007 et au postulat 08.3765 de la Commission des institutions politiques du Conseil national du 20 novembre 2008" (PDF). Feuille fédérale (in French) (13): 2067–2144. April 7, 2010.

== See also ==
=== Related articles ===
- Federal Constitution
- Swiss law
- Federal Gazette
- National Commission for the Prevention of Torture

=== External links ===
- Systematic Compendium on the website of the Federal Administration
- Federal laws on the website of the Swiss Parliament
