= History of Switzerland since 1914 =

Map of Switzerland and Swiss cantons.

The history of Switzerland since 1914 encompasses the final phase of the formation of the Confederation of 22 cantons, commencing with the aftermath of World War I and culminating in the establishment of the canton of Jura. This period also marks the subsequent trajectory of the country's history.

During the First World War, German-speaking Switzerland demonstrated a proclivity towards the Central Powers. In contrast, French-speaking Switzerland, exhibiting greater affinity for the Allies, voiced opposition to the appointment of Ulrich Wille as the army's general. The population endured food shortages throughout the conflict. In 1915, the Federal Council enacted a monopoly on grain distribution. After the war, while Vorarlberg voted for annexation to Switzerland but was ultimately assigned to Austria, the country adopted a foreign policy of armed neutrality. Switzerland joined the League of Nations (LN) in 1920, with its headquarters established in Geneva.

The social difficulties caused by the war led to the general strike of 1918, which resulted in the limitation of working hours and the ending of the Radical Party majority in the Federal Assembly, and subsequently in the Federal Council. The internal politics polarised into two opposing fronts that used referendums to block decisions, forcing the government to use urgent federal decrees. Economically, Switzerland suffered from the 1921, 1922, and 1929 crisis crash.

The early 1930s saw the rise of fascist movements and clashes between the far-left and far-right, which reached a shooting on November 9, 1932 in Geneva with the shooting and continued until 1937, when the "labor peace" agreement was signed, effectively ending direct ideological confrontations. The government also prepared the country for another military conflict during this period.

At the onset of World War II in 1939, Switzerland was not unprepared. Before the conflict, the government had secured supplies, mobilized the army under the command of General Henri Guisan, and initiated a rationing program to ensure the population's basic needs were met. However, by May 1940, the country was surrounded by Axis forces, placing the government in a challenging position.

Following the conclusion of the war, Switzerland proceeded with the further development of its welfare state. Domestically, the "magic formula" was introduced in 1959 and remained unchanged until 2003. Women's suffrage was accepted at the federal level in 1971. The late 1960s were marked by the Jura Question, which concerned the establishment of the new canton of Jura on January 1, 1979, created by separating part of the canton of Bern.

== World War I ==
=== Preparation of the Swiss army ===
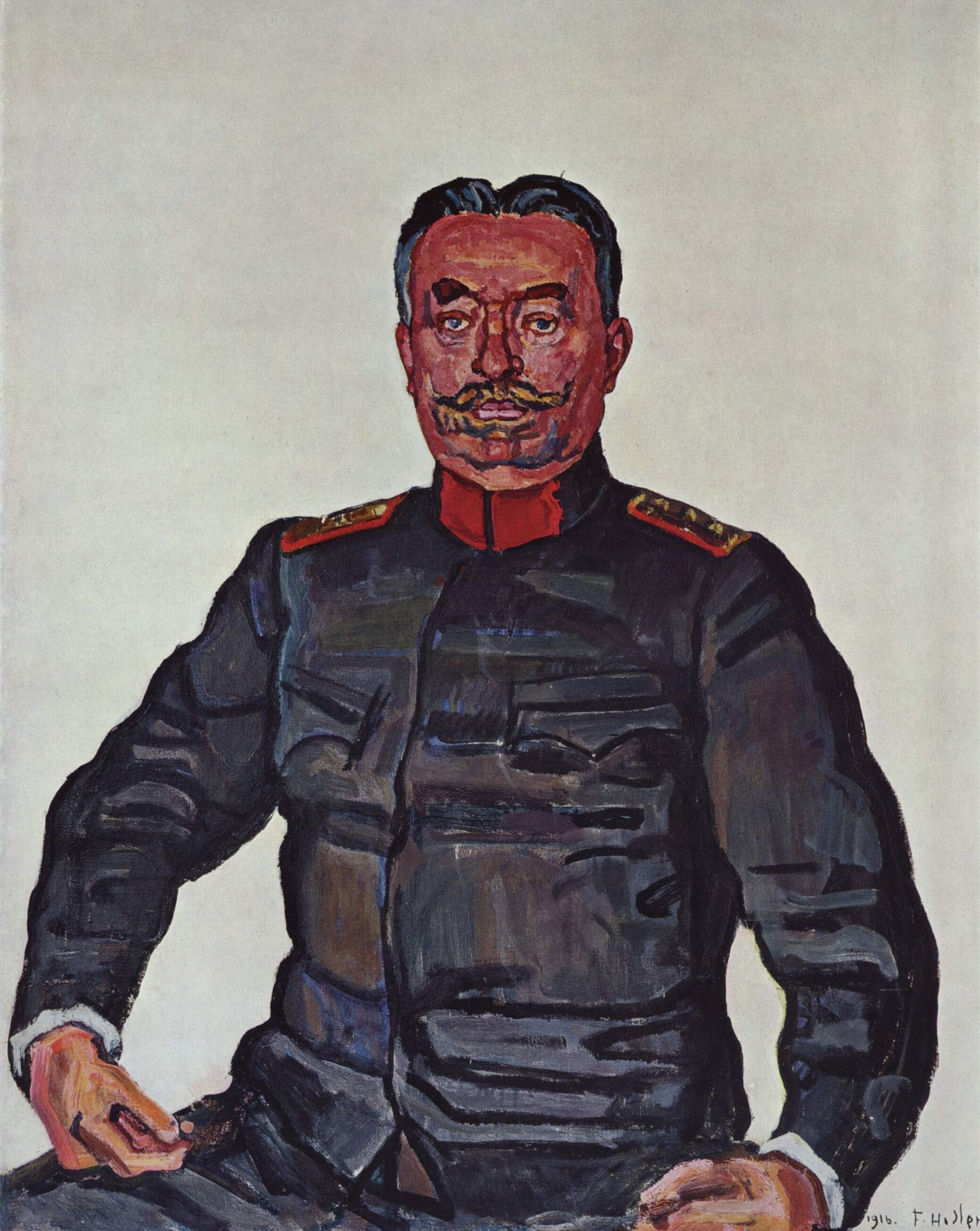
Portrait of General Wille by Ferdinand Hodler in 1916

On August 4, 1914, three days after Prussia declared war on Russia, which marked the commencement of the First World War, Switzerland, through the Federal Council, issued a declaration of neutrality. This was by the decision made in 1815 by European powers at the Congress of Vienna, which confirmed Switzerland's perpetual neutrality. This accord had established Switzerland's perpetual neutrality, a commitment that was acknowledged and guaranteed by both France and Prussia, who pledged to "scrupulously respect the neutrality of Switzerland." (Note: Andrey 2007, pp. 399–400)

Officers' barracks, Umbrail Pass, 1914

As early as July 31, 1914, the Federal Council ordered the general mobilization of the Swiss army, which at the time comprised 220,000 men, who subsequently entered service between August 3 and 7. In addition to this mobilization, the Federal Council, having received full powers from the Federal Assembly, elected Ulrich Wille as the general of the Swiss army, despite opposition from several parliamentarians among the Romands and the Socialists.

Following the implementation of successive reorganizations of the army in 1907 and 1911, leaders of the Swiss General Staff were allowed to evaluate the efficacy of their newly devised structure, thereby ensuring a measured response to the declaration of war. The 1912 maneuvers attracted the attention of a notable guest, Emperor Wilhelm II of Germany. In terms of equipment, troops had been equipped with carbines since 1911 and had machine guns and grenades. However, production was insufficient in terms of ammunition and other materials, such as uniforms, steel helmets, and gas masks, which were only delivered between 1916 and 1918. Furthermore, the army lacked armored vehicles and had only limited aviation and artillery forces.

=== The Franco-German divide ===
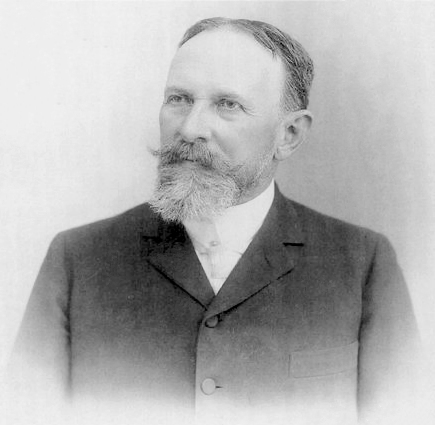
Portrait of the poet Carl Spitteler

The conflict resulted in a deepening of the divide between the Romands (French-speaking Swiss) and the Alemannic Swiss (German-speaking Swiss). The former supported the Allies and denounced the "Teutomania" of their German-speaking cousins. At the same time, the latter, through the voice of a future Alemannic Federal Councillor, criticized the "old disloyalty of the Romands." The controversy reached a crescendo with the German Army's invasion of neutral Belgium. The Romand press aligned with the Allies, while the Alemannic press endorsed the German intervention. Despite repeated interventions by the Federal Council on October 1, 1914, and by the poet Carl Spitteler on December 14, 1914, (Note: Jost 1982, p. 715) the term Graben (German for "gap") emerged, symbolizing the political rifts that arose from this controversy.

The initial crisis originated from the army chief, who was already regarded as being anti-Romand and anti-Socialist, having married Countess von Bismarck. On July 20, 1915, he proposed to the Federal Council that the country should enter the war alongside Prussia. This letter, which was revealed by the press, caused significant discontent in Romandy.

In 1915, Léon Froidevaux, the editor of the newspaper Le Petit Jurassien in Moutier, asserted that the Bernese Jura was analogous to the Alsace-Lorraine region of France. This remark prompted a two-month suspension of the newspaper's publication. Froidevaux reiterated his assertion in the following months by disclosing that cartridges had been removed from military personnel stationed at the Jura border. As a result, he was charged with treason and sentenced to 13 months' imprisonment.

In December 1915, the affair between the colonels came to a head. General Wille and the Federal Council were informed that Colonels Friedrich Moritz von Wattenwyl and Karl Egli, both members of the General Staff, had divulged confidential documents to the Germans and Austro-Hungarians. On January 11, 1916, the Federal Council ordered an administrative inquiry to be conducted, which was followed by judicial proceedings. The two accused were found not guilty under criminal law on February 28 and returned to the army for possible disciplinary action. Wille, who had hoped to keep the affair quiet and opposed their conviction, believing it would harm the army's image, sentenced them to only twenty days of strict detention.

On January 27, 1916, the German consulate in Lausanne hoisted its flag to commemorate the anniversary of the Emperor's birth. This gesture prompted protests from local youths who tore down the flag, resulting in a diplomatic incident. This was ultimately resolved through the presentation of apologies by the Vaud government to the consul, by the Federal Council to the German ambassador, and by the Swiss ambassador to the imperial government.

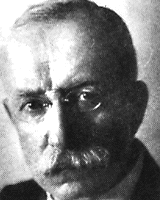
Portrait of Federal Councillor Arthur Hoffman

In May 1917, Robert Grimm, a Socialist National Councillor from Bern, endeavored to facilitate the conclusion of a separate peace agreement between Russia and Germany. He was supported in this endeavor by Federal Councillor Arthur Hoffmann, head of the Political Department, who acted without the requisite consent of his colleagues. On June 18, 1917, the Grimm–Hoffmann affair came to light when a telegram exchanged between the two men was intercepted and deciphered by the French Army, subsequently made public by Minister Albert Thomas. As a result of these developments, Grimm was expelled from Russia, and Hoffmann resigned on June 19, 1917. This was in response to mounting criticism from the Allies, who viewed this unilateral initiative as a breach of Switzerland's neutrality. Additionally, public demonstrations in Romandy and Ticino further contributed to the political turmoil of the time.

In 1917, Paul Graber, a socialist journalist and member of the National Council of Switzerland, published an article in which he detailed the alleged mistreatment of a Swiss soldier by his officers during a march. He was sentenced to eight days' imprisonment in La Chaux-de-Fonds but was supported by his colleague Jules Humbert-Droz, who organized a demonstration to secure his release. The military stopped the demonstration, and Humbert-Droz was sentenced to three months' imprisonment for insulting the army.

=== Economic and social consequences of the war ===
The economic warfare waged by the belligerents impacted significantly Switzerland, which was surrounded by warring countries for the first time since 1815. However, following negotiations, both parties agreed to continue the delivery of raw materials, on the condition that these materials were not resold to their respective adversaries. The Allies, who deliberately limited their deliveries to the needs of Swiss consumption, demanded the creation of a central purchasing agency to monitor the use of the products. This was done on August 6, 1915, with the establishment of the Swiss Economic Surveillance Society, followed by the creation of the Swiss Fiduciary Office for the Control of Goods Traffic. In addition to the diplomatic issues, the volume of imports was also affected by transport disruptions and the diminished delivery capacities of suppliers.

The considerable expense of Swiss mobilization was rapidly borne by the population. While the country's external debt tripled between 1913 and 1925, the Confederation was compelled to implement a direct federal tax for the first time in 1915, as customs duties were no longer adequate to cover public expenditure.

These factors resulted in a notable surge in inflationary pressures. The escalation in the cost of essential commodities (food, clothing, and fuel, in particular) significantly outpaced wage growth, leading to a nearly 30% decline in workers' purchasing power. This followed a period during which the cost-of-living index rose from 100 to 250 points between 1914 and 1919. Furthermore, the average length of service for soldiers during the war was 500 days, during which time they received only their daily pay and no salary compensation. This resulted in further impoverishment of the population. (Note: Jost 1982, p. 716)

Despite the establishment of a "grain office" (subsequently renamed the "Bread Office") in 1914 and the introduction of a wheat monopoly in January 1915, at the behest of the leftist faction, the government did not implement a federal rationing plan for foodstuffs until the autumn of 1917. This decision was made concurrently with establishing a Federal Food Office, which was tasked with addressing the needs of the population facing economic challenges. In 1918, it was officially reported that 692,000 individuals (one-sixth of the population) could not meet their financial obligations. (Note: Jost 1982, pp. 716–717)

=== Treaty of Versailles and Vorarlberg ===
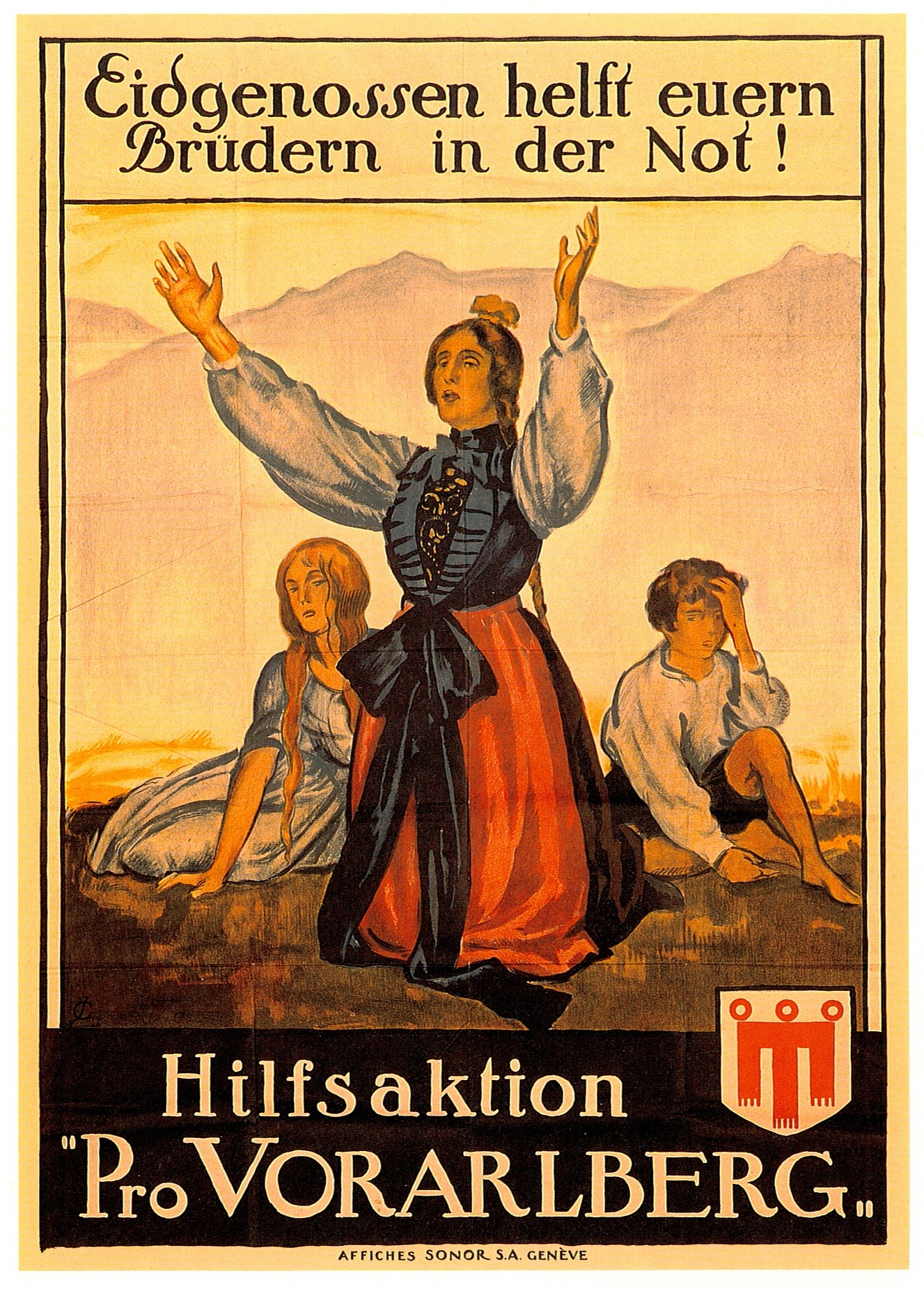
Propaganda poster for the reunion of Vorarlberg with Switzerland by Jules Courvoisier

The signing of the Treaty of Versailles by the German and Allied powers on June 28, 1919, confirmed Switzerland's status as a neutral state. In return, Switzerland formally renounced its right (never exercised) to occupy Northern Savoy, which had been granted at the request of the Kingdom of Sardinia in 1815. (Note: Bouquet 2005, p. 103) However, the treaty did not address the issue of free-trade zones, particularly those granted by Napoleon III in Haute-Savoie and the Pays de Gex. This point was only settled on October 30, 1924, following mediation by the Permanent Court of International Justice.

In the aftermath of the Habsburg Empire's dissolution, many border regions within the newly constituted Austrian state sought to integrate with their neighboring states. In a plebiscite held on May 11, 1919, 82% of the inhabitants of Vorarlberg approved a unilateral declaration of independence, coupled with a request to join Switzerland. While the French-speaking and Protestant Swiss opposed this request, fearing it would upset the federal balance, others expressed support, notably Colonel Fernand Feyler, editor-in-chief of the Revue Militaire Suisse. Feyler advocated for Vorarlberg's attachment to Switzerland and for separating the territory of the former diocese of Basel from the canton of Bern.

Nevertheless, disregarding the popular vote, the triumphant Allied forces designated Vorarlberg as Austrian territory through the Treaty of Saint-Germain. Concurrently, the bilateral convention signed on March 29, 1923 formalized the relationship between Switzerland and Liechtenstein in the same region. This convention officially established a customs union between the two countries.

== The 1918 general strike ==
=== The Olten committee ===
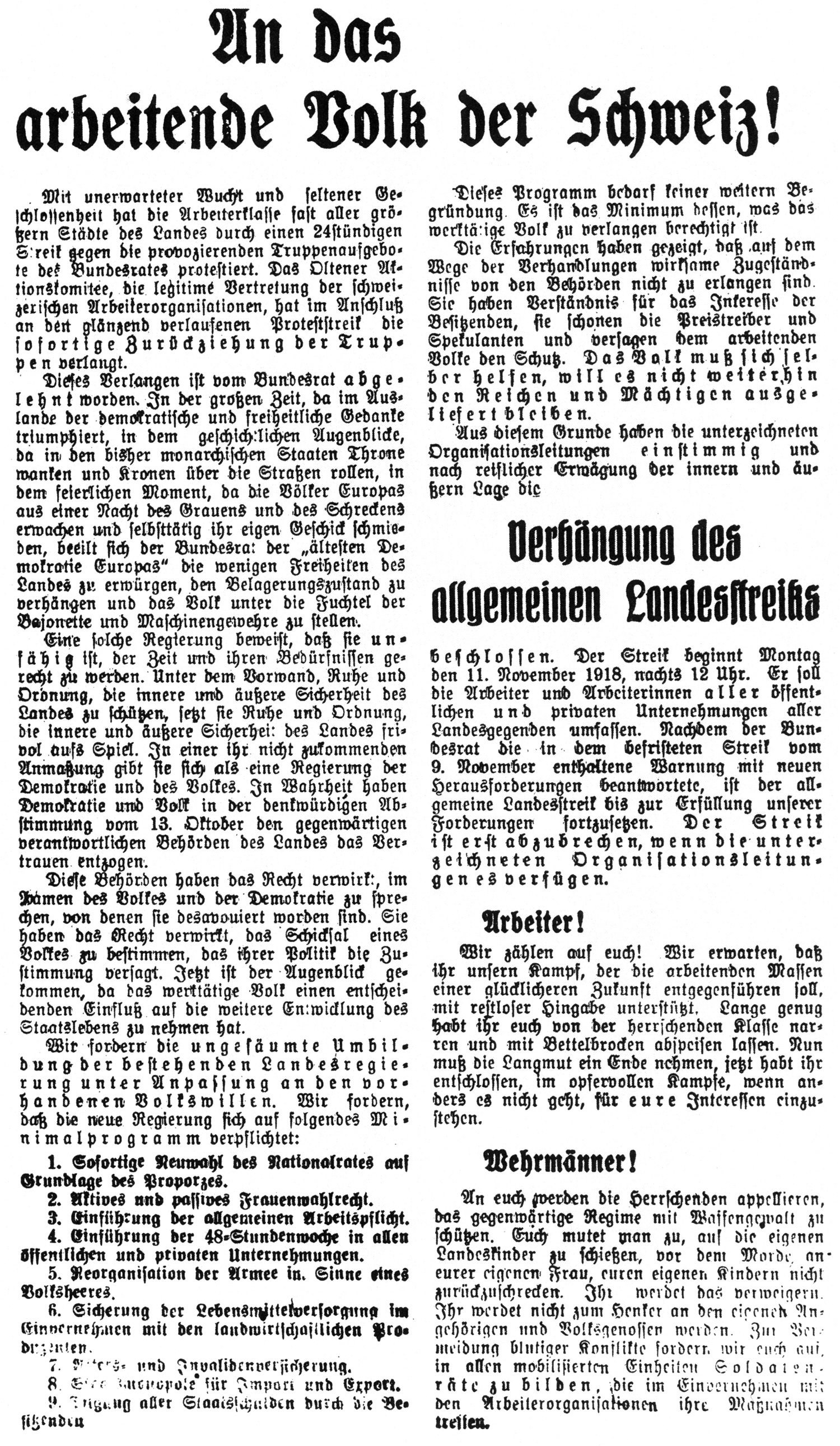
Poster with the text of the Comité d'Olte appeal.

While the elected officials of the Swiss Socialist Party, like their counterparts, voted to grant the Federal Council full powers at the outbreak of the war, the party and the Swiss Trade Union Federation subsequently adopted a more assertive stance in response to mounting public discontent over the deteriorating social and economic situation.

Following the Swiss-Italian conference in Lugano, the party organized two international conferences. The first was held from September 5 to 8, 1915 in Zimmerwald, while the second took place from April 24 to 30, 1916 in Kienthal. (Note: Jost 1982, p. 718) At these meetings, Lenin and his political allies presented their civil war projects and convinced a portion of the militants. On November 17, 1917, a spontaneous celebration organized by the Socialist Youth and anarchists to mark the October Revolution in Russia turned into a riot. The demonstrations, which the party leaders did not endorse, resulted in violence and the deaths of three demonstrators and a police officer.

On February 4, 1918, in Olten, a gathering of left-wing leaders took place at the initiative of Robert Grimm. Those in attendance included Socialist National Councilors, unionists, and journalists. A seven-member committee, designated the Olten Committee, was elected; political opponents characterized this as a "soviet" or a "counter-Federal Council." In April 1918, the Olten Committee presented a series of demands to the Federal Council regarding the rising prices, issuing threats of industrial action in response. The government made partial concessions, acknowledging the legitimacy of some of the committee's demands. In the same year, the committee also opposed the introduction of compulsory civil service, which would have required all Swiss residents aged 16 to 60 to perform public-interest work for pay, (Note: Jost 1982, p. 719) and the authorization given to cantonal police to monitor public gatherings. Once again, the committee prevailed before the Federal Council.

During the summer of 1918, rumors began to circulate concerning a "plot" that had been orchestrated by representatives of the Russian revolutionary government. This plot was perceived to be similar to the rise of the labor movement in Germany and Austria at the time. The strike action initiated by employees of a Zurich bank on September 30, 1918, demanding an increase in remuneration, was perceived by several local bourgeois figures, including General Wille, as a dress rehearsal for the forthcoming revolution. Consequently, they called for troop deployment. The Federal Council approved the request on November 7 and deployed troops to occupy Zurich and Bern. This military mobilization provoked outrage among labor organizations, prompting the Olten Committee to call for a protest strike, which took place peacefully in nineteen industrial centers on November 9, 1918.

However, on Sunday, November 10, a confrontation occurred between demonstrators and military personnel at Zurich's Fraumünster Square. In response to the disturbances, the Olten Committee called for an indefinite general strike to commence on November 12 throughout the country. (Note: Andrey 2007, p. 420) The following day, which marked the anniversary of the armistice, work resumed as usual across the country, except for Zurich. Before the next day's strike, the Olten Committee issued a nine-point political demand program, known as the 'Olten Committee Appeal'.

=== November 12, 13 and 14, 1918 ===
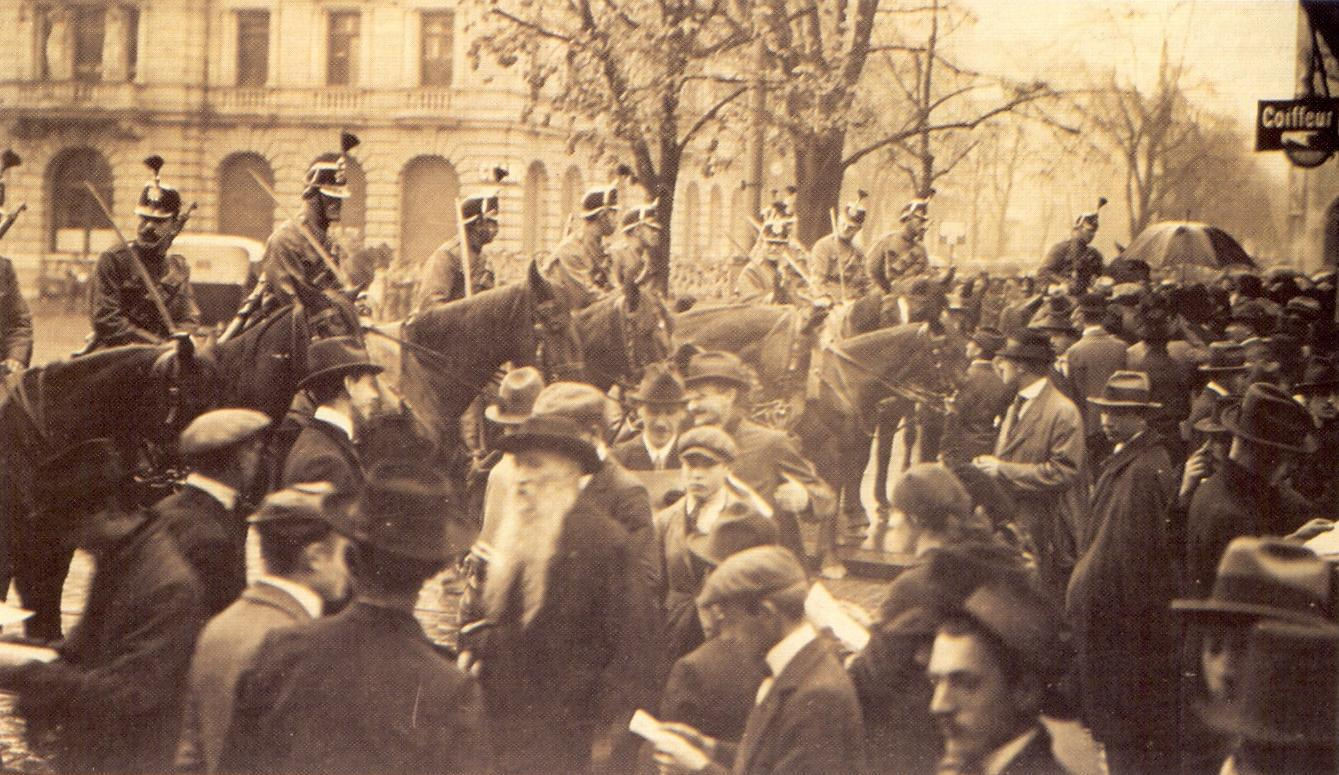
Strike in Zurich on November 12, 1918.

The strike, which commenced as scheduled on the morning of November 12, 1918, was followed by 400,000 workers, including 300,000 railway workers who ceased operations on the trains. The strikers primarily congregated in the German-speaking regions of the Swiss Plateau, but also in the French-speaking cities of Geneva and Lausanne, where the armistice celebrations overshadowed the strike. Throughout, the strike remained peaceful, largely due to the measures implemented by labor organizations, including the prohibition of alcohol consumption.

Meanwhile, the Federal Council relocated to the Bellevue Hotel in Bern, where the army headquarters was also situated. Information from the country was gradually received: railways were entirely obstructed, as were trams in Geneva. In Moutier, the power supply to factories was momentarily terminated. At 11 am, the Federal Assembly, comprising 60 parliamentarians unable to reach Bern, convened to hear President Felix-Louis Calonder's address. Meanwhile, essential services were maintained by "strikebreakers", including students and members of bourgeois militias.

On November 13, National Councillor and Olten Committee President Robert Grimm submitted a motion, which was rejected by 120 votes to 14, calling for the reformation of the Federal Council with a left-wing majority and the re-election of the National Council by proportional representation. Simultaneously, a demonstration demanding the release of some arrested demonstrators occurred in Solothurn. The demonstrators were ordered to disperse by soldiers, resulting in one person sustaining injuries. The Federal Council, still in session, demanded the Olten Committee surrender and end the general strike by publishing a written statement "before 5 p.m."; Robert Grimm's response was unequivocal: "It's well thought out. The working class will triumph or die fighting."

However, the Olten Committee, convening that evening under the supervision of General Wille's troops, who had deployed units from rural regions to Zurich, (Note: Jost 1982, p. 720) voted to terminate the strike. The decision was formally communicated to the Federal Council at 2 a.m. on November 14, 1918. The strike order was gradually disseminated throughout the day to various picket lines, which, on occasion, albeit reluctantly, were compelled to cease their movement. Despite the absence of significant casualties over three days, a virulent Spanish flu epidemic would subsequently ravage the country, with its propagation accelerated by the mobilization of over 100,000 soldiers. This resulted in the deaths of more than 20,000 persons, including 3,000 in the military.

=== Consequences of the strike ===
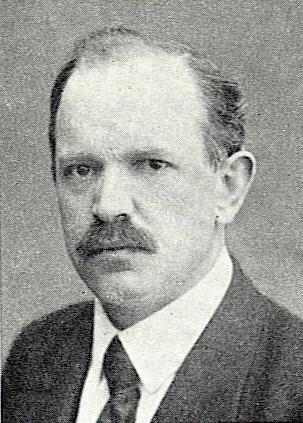
Portrait of Robert Grimm, Chairman of the Comité d'Olte.

The three days of the general strike have had several consequences at the legal level, with the condemnation of several involved personalities; at the political level, there has been a change in perception and a hardening of the right; and finally, at the social level, there has been an acceptance of some of the demands.

Regarding the legal ramifications, 146 individuals were subjected to penalties ranging from imprisonment for four members of the Olten Committee—namely, Robert Grimm, Friedrich Schneider, Fritz Platten, and Ernst Nobs—to fines for railway workers. These sentences were pronounced by military justice, primarily during the trial between March 12 and April 9, 1919.

From a political perspective, the strike was presented as a revolutionary endeavor by the anti-communist movement, thereby enabling the hardline bourgeois right to gain ground, particularly by establishing the Swiss Patriotic Federation at the expense of radical reformists. It was not until approximately fifty years later that historical studies refuted the theory of revolutionary intent by the Olten Committee and its purported support from the Soviet Union.

Regarding social policy, four of the nine points presented in the Olten Committee's demands were implemented in the following years. The initial demand, namely the election of the National Council by proportional representation, had already been accepted in a referendum on October 18, 1918. The first application of this decision took place in 1919 and increased the number of left-wing parliamentarians. Furthermore, the 48-hour workweek was introduced in 1919, as demanded in point 4 of the demands, in "all public and private enterprises." Points 2 and 7, which respectively called for women's suffrage and eligibility, and the creation of old-age and survivors' insurance, were not implemented until 1971 and 1947, respectively.

In addition to these four points, relations between trade unions and employers underwent a transformation, with unions assuming a more prominent role in business decision-making processes. Nevertheless, despite these social advancements, the general strike was historically regarded as a failure due to the capitulation of the movement's leaders.

== Interwar period ==
=== New political balance ===
The autumn of 1919 saw the inaugural National Council elections conducted via proportional representation, following the preceding year's popular initiative that sought to establish this electoral system. This marked the conclusion of the Radical Party's tenure in power. In light of the ascendance of the Catholic Conservatives, they were compelled to concede the allocation of a second seat on the Federal Council to this faction. The Fribourgeois Jean-Marie Musy, elected to this second seat, would challenge the collegiality of the executive with his individualistic approach and his disagreements with Finance Minister Edmund Schulthess. (Note: Jost 1982, p. 723) Concurrently, the most right-wing faction of the Radical Party proceeded to establish the Party of Farmers, Traders, and Bourgeois, which would subsequently serve as the basis for the Swiss People's Party (UDC). This nascent party secured its own Federal Council seat on December 12, 1929, with the election of Rudolf Minger. (Note: Bouquet 2005, pp. 104–105)

In the 1919 elections, the Socialist Party was among the most successful, gaining 22 seats and increasing its representation from 19 to 41 members. (Note: Andrey 2007, p. 429) Despite this electoral success, the party was beset by internal divisions, which reached a crescendo on March 6, 1921, with the secession of a section of the left wing. This faction, together with the movement of the 'old Communists', established the Swiss Communist Party, which joined the Communist International and espoused Bolshevik principles.

In the aftermath of the First World War, many bourgeois militias were established, the majority of which subsequently joined the Swiss Patriotic Federation. Smaller groups emerged, including the Order and Tradition group, based in Lausanne in 1919, and the Swiss Alliance, which was founded in 1921. By the early 1930s, these groups had given rise to various far-right "fronts", with the National Union in Geneva and the National Front in Zurich representing the most prominent examples. (Note: Jost 1982, pp. 736–737)

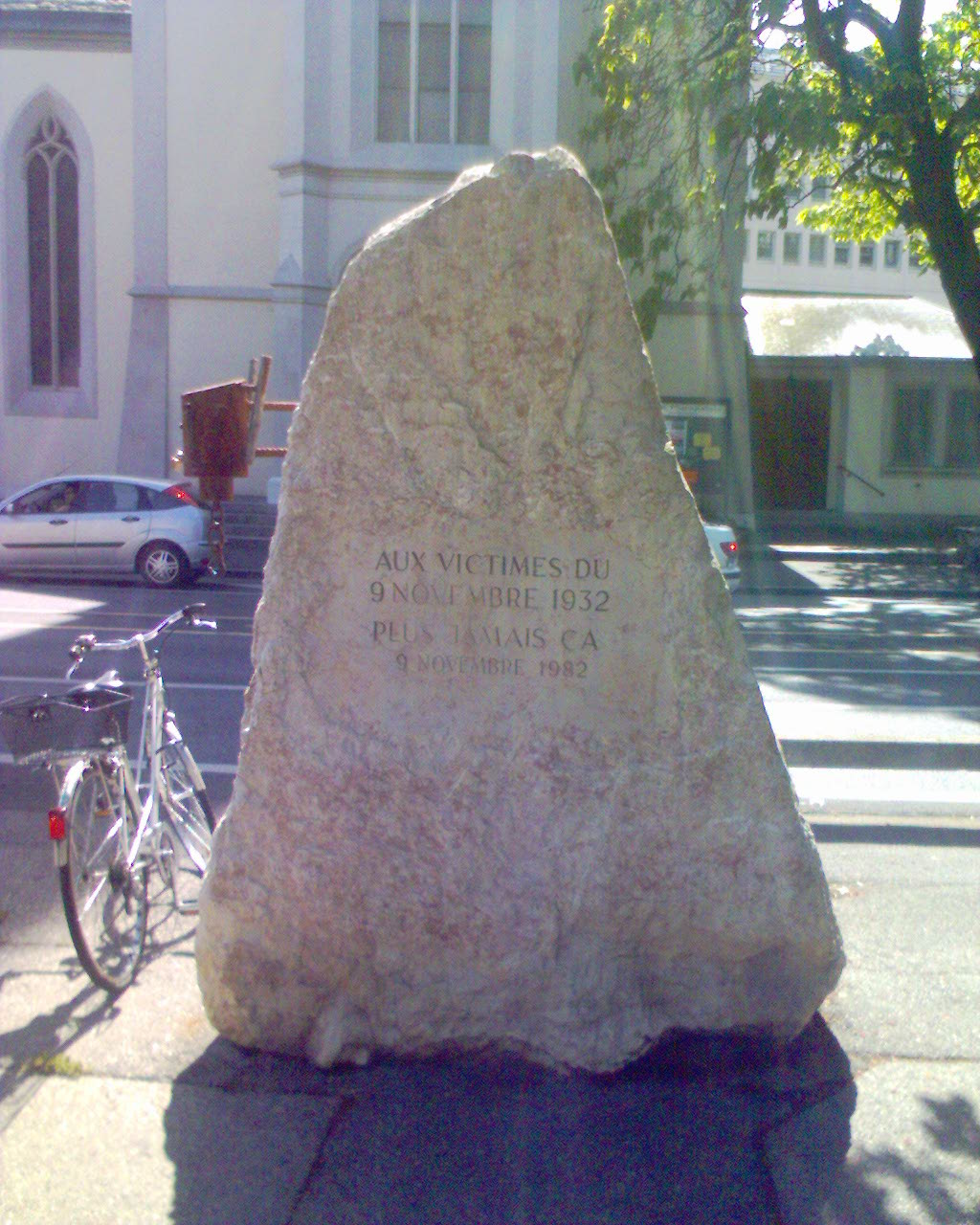
Monument erected in memory of the November 9 shootings in Geneva.

In Geneva, journalist and writer Georges Oltramare, leader of the National Union and editor-in-chief of the anti-communist and anti-Semitic newspaper Le Pilori, attracted considerable attention in 1932 when a left-wing counter-demonstration was organized to prevent a meeting of his movement. The troops, called in by the government and lacking experience in such situations, opened fire, killing 13 people. In the aftermath of this shooting and the subsequent trial of left-wing leaders, the Geneva Socialist Party, led by Léon Nicole, secured victory in the cantonal elections and attained a majority in the cantonal government the following year.

Notwithstanding the proliferation of far-right movements in the period following 1933, they could not secure significant electoral victories. By 1935, these movements had weakened for many reasons, including the diversity of groups, the rivalry among their leaders, and Switzerland's federalist nature. In 1936, several sympathizers re-affiliated with bourgeois parties, leaving only marginal groups active. One such group was the Alliance of Independents, founded by Gottlieb Duttweiler in the same year. However, the Nazi victories in Europe in 1940 enabled them to revive until the end of the war and the victory of the Democrats. (Note: Jost 1982, p. 739)

During the period between 1919 and 1939, many popular initiatives were rejected in referendums. These included the two "Lex Häberlin" proposals, named after Federal Councillor Heinrich Häberlin. The aforementioned initiatives sought to reinforce the Penal Code by imposing penalties for crimes against public order (rejected by 55.4% of voters on September 24, 1922) and to enhance the protection of public order from the potential threats posed by far-left movements and frontist groups (rejected by 53.8% of voters on March 11, 1934). Another initiative, launched jointly by the far-right and corporatist movements and presented as a revision of the constitution, sought to replace liberal democracy with an anti-democratic corporatist regime. (Note: Andrey 2007, p. 431) It was rejected by 72.3% of voters, with a participation rate of over 60%. Throughout the 1930s, the Federal Council classified its potentially controversial decrees as urgent, thereby circumventing the requirement for referendums under Article 89 of the Federal Constitution. (Note: Jost 1982, p. 864) This practice was challenged by several popular initiatives, including the 'Return to Direct Democracy' initiative, which people accepted on September 11, 1949.

=== Swiss foreign policy ===
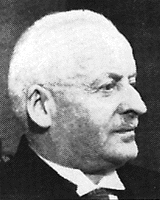
Portrait of Federal Councillor Giuseppe Mott.

In the context of Swiss foreign policy, the period between the two world wars is occasionally designated as the "Motta Era", a reference to Federal Councillor Giuseppe Motta, who served as the head of the Federal Department of Foreign Affairs (then designated as the "Political Department") from 1920 until his demise in 1940. During this period, the country's activities were primarily focused on two key issues: the question of joining the League of Nations and its diplomatic relations with Germany, Italy, and the Soviet Union.

Following the acceptance of the American proposal to establish a League of Nations at the Paris Conference, the pact was formally signed on April 28, 1919, thereby officially designating the city of Geneva as the seat of the organization. This followed a proposal by a delegation headed by Federal Councillor Felix-Louis Calonder in March 1919. The subsequent matter for consideration was whether Switzerland should become a member of the organization. A message on this topic, sent by the Federal Council on August 4, 1919, and approved by the Federal Assembly on November 21, 1919, (Note: Andrey 2007, p. 425) questioned the compatibility of membership with the principle of neutrality. This concern was subsequently addressed by the publication of the London Declaration on February 13, 1920, which granted Switzerland a status of "differential neutrality", thereby enabling it to apply only economic, rather than military, sanctions. In the end, the Swiss electorate voted in favor of joining the League of Nations on May 16, 1920, with 56.3% of the vote and the support of 10 cantons and three half-cantons. This enabled Giuseppe Motta to open the organization's inaugural General Assembly on November 15, 1920.

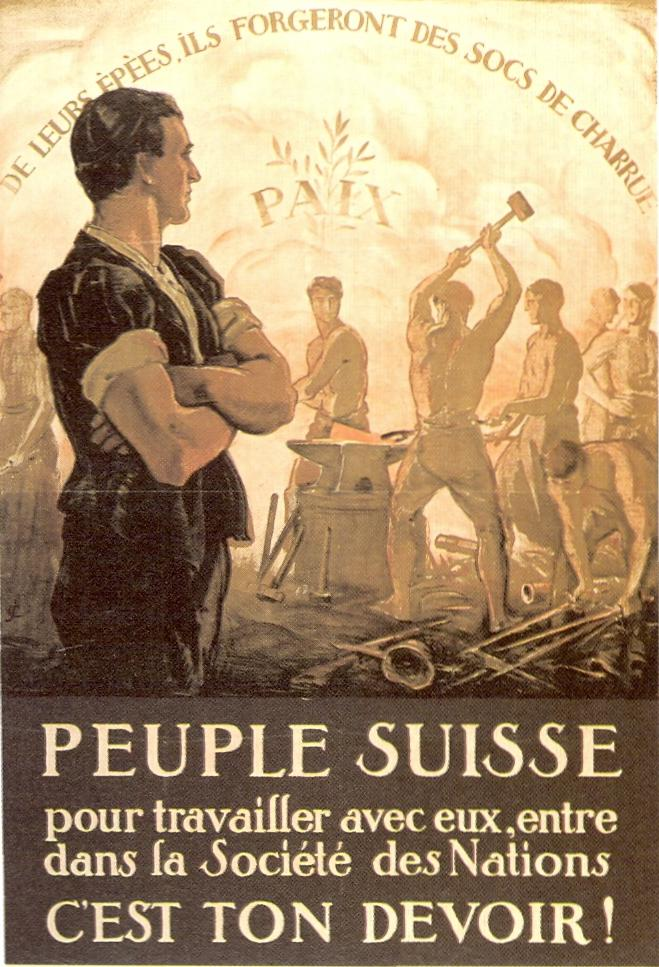
Poster campaign for SdN in Geneva in 1920.

On October 5, 1925, at the behest of Federal Councillor Motta, the Locarno Conference commenced, convening most European powers. A rapprochement between France and Germany permitted the latter, now a republic, to be admitted to the League of Nations. Subsequently, the withdrawals of Japan and Germany in 1933, and the vote on sanctions against Italy in 1935, resulted in a significant weakening of the League's authority. Following the Austrian annexation, the Federal Council formally petitioned for Switzerland to renounce differential neutrality and revert to full neutrality. This appeal was granted on May 14, 1938, and subsequently endorsed by Switzerland's neighboring countries, which were no longer members of the League of Nations. (Note: Andrey 2007, p. 427)

One of the most significant challenges during this period was recognizing the Soviet Union. Despite signing an agreement between the two countries in Berlin in 1927, the Swiss population, particularly in French-speaking Switzerland, continued to express strong opposition to any form of rapprochement. This public pressure resulted in the Federal Council's opposition to the Soviet Union's membership in the League of Nations in 1934. In contrast, relations with Italy and Germany were characterized by cordiality. To illustrate, Switzerland only participated in the sanctions imposed by the League of Nations against Italy during the Second Italo-Ethiopian War in a symbolic capacity. Furthermore, it was the first neutral country to recognize the Italian colonial empire in Africa in December 1936. Similarly, relations with the Third Reich, Switzerland's primary trading partner, were amicable. For example, Federal Councillor Edmund Schulthess met with Chancellor Adolf Hitler on February 23, 1937. During this meeting, Hitler reaffirmed Switzerland's neutrality, emphasizing shared values such as anti-communism. (Note: Jost 1982, p. 742) Two years prior, Swiss diplomatic efforts had successfully secured the release of journalist Berthold Jacob, who had been abducted in Basel by the Gestapo.

In response to a request from the newly formed German government, the Federal Council enacted restrictions on press freedom on March 26, 1934. Following the declaration of war in 1939, the army assumed complete control over the press. The Federal Council resumed control on February 1, 1942. Despite the absence of a comprehensive censorship regime, the implementation of control measures and associated sanctions contributed to a moderation of opinion in the press during this period. (Note: Jost 1982, p. 741)

=== Economic crises and labor peace ===
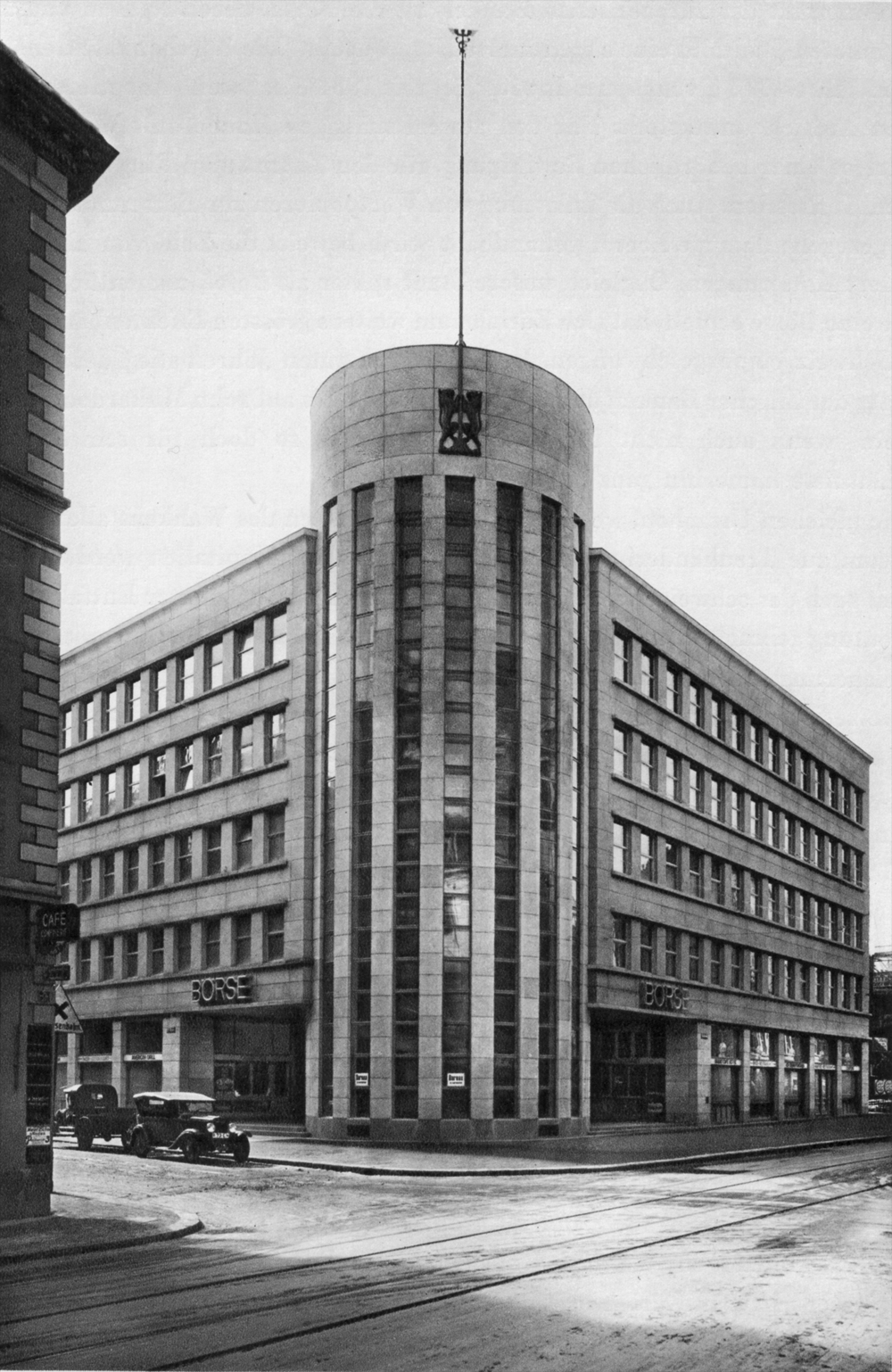
The Zurich Stock Exchange building built in 1930.

The interwar period was marked by a series of economic crises, which were addressed differently in Switzerland depending on the period in question. The initial economic crisis occurred between 1921 and 1922, resulting in over 130,000 unemployed individuals. (Note: Andrey 2007, p. 437) To address the aforementioned crisis, Federal Councillor Edmund Schulthess proposed extending the workweek to 54 hours, an increase from the 48 hours that had been in effect since June 22, 1919. This proposed legislation, formally designated as the "Lex Schulthess", was ultimately rejected by a majority of 57.6% of voters on February 17, 1924. In the same year, the Federal Assembly enacted a separate law that established a system of optional unemployment insurance, with the associated premiums to be shared equally between employees and employers.

In the 1920s, Switzerland remained committed to the gold standard monetary system, a decision that was made even though most industrialized countries had already abandoned it in the wake of the global economic crisis. Consequently, the volume and value of exports significantly declined in the early 1930s, yet this did not elicit any notable political responses during the first half of the decade. The prevailing stance among the authorities was that the financial sector and the theoretical underpinnings of a robust national currency were of paramount importance. It was in September 1936 that the Swiss franc underwent a 30% devaluation. (Note: Jost 1982, p. 684)

The Wall Street Crash of New York, which occurred between October 24 and 29, 1929, also had repercussions in Switzerland, albeit with a delay of several years. While the export industry was promptly affected by the protectionist measures enacted by neighboring countries, the economic situation in Switzerland remained favorable, particularly due to the thriving construction and major civil engineering sectors. However, the economy collapsed in 1931, reaching its lowest point the following year and continuing until 1936. The most severely affected sectors were the textile industry (which never recovered), banking, and tourism. In 1934, the Banking Law was passed. In addition to stricter requirements aimed at protecting savers, it established banking secrecy, which has remained a controversial issue to this day.

Following the approval of an extraordinary armament program by the Federal Assembly in June 1936, financed through a 3% interest loan, the economic situation began to improve. The program, which had a budget of 235 million francs, was approved by the Federal Assembly. This increased interactions between employers and unions, which entered into collective agreements in various sectors. These agreements facilitated the signing of the "Peace of Labor" on July 19, 1937, between four workers' unions and two employers' associations. The objective of this agreement was to "mutually clarify, according to the rules of good faith, the main differences and potential conflicts, seek to resolve them based on the provisions of this agreement, and observe comprehensive peace throughout its duration." It explicitly prohibited strikes and lockouts. Initially concerning only the metalworking sector of the watchmaking industry, this Peace of Labor gradually extended to all branches of the economy and included the state, which became the guarantor of the proper implementation of decisions. (Note: Andrey 2007, p. 441)

== World War II ==
=== Preparation and mobilization ===
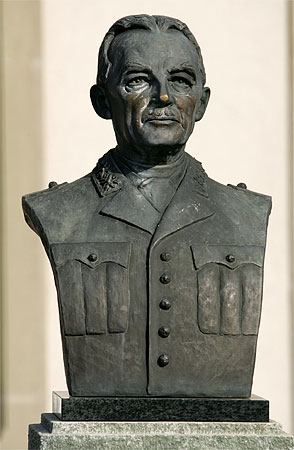
Bust of General Henri Guisan in Avenches.

In 1927, the Swiss Parliament enacted a resolution to freeze military spending, particularly the work undertaken in the country's various forts. However, two years later, the Parliament reversed its decision, granting the army a total budget of 800 million francs between 1935 and 1939. By this time, however, the Swiss army had only 30 tanks. The fortifications office, which had been dissolved in 1921, was reactivated in 1935, and the following year it initiated a series of fort construction and terrain reinforcement projects in the northern regions of the country. Concurrently, a new military organization extended the duration of recruit school from 67 to 90 days in 1935 and 118 days in 1939.

Implementing these reforms was made possible due to the support of the Socialist Party for the national defense program, which was necessary to mitigate the risk of conflict with neighboring fascist countries. This significantly reduced domestic political tensions. Combined with the restoration of full powers to the Federal Council on August 30, 1939, and the economic recovery driven largely by the military industry, this enabled the country to operate on firmer ground. (Note: Jost 1982, pp. 745–746)

Upon confirmation of the commencement of World War II, the Federal Council appointed Colonel Henri Guisan, hailing from Vaud, as the commander-in-chief of the Swiss army and transmitted the customary official declaration of neutrality to the belligerent powers. The army was mobilized without significant difficulty between September 3 and 5, 1939, although military leaders had not yet devised an operational plan. (Note: Jost 1982, p. 748) A defensive line was established along the Limmat. With minimal activity on the German-French front, the mobilized forces were gradually reduced to free men for agricultural and industrial purposes.

In the subsequent months, General Guisan initiated discussions with the French government to establish a framework for military collaboration in the event of a potential German invasion of Switzerland. However, this plan was intercepted by the Germans during the French collapse in 1940 and subsequently employed as a bargaining tool by the latter. (Note: Bouquet 2005, pp. 109–110)

=== National redoubt and the Wahlen plan ===
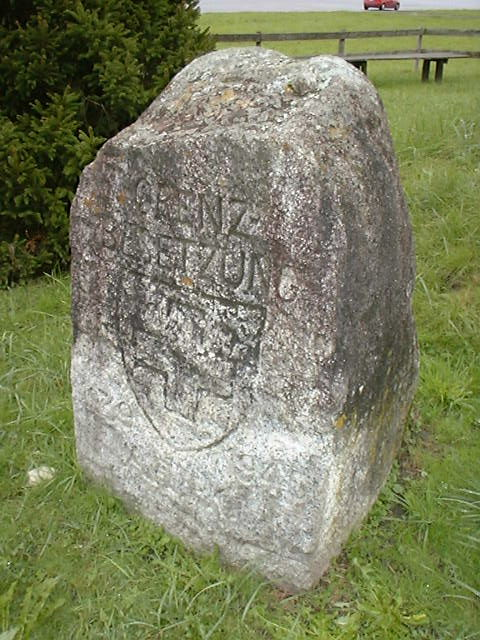
Boundary pillar erected during the Second World War symbolically at the exact center of the country.

Following the conclusion of the Phoney War on May 10, 1940, Switzerland found itself in a geopolitically challenging position. The German invasion of the Netherlands, Luxembourg, and Belgium, coupled with the subsequent armistice with France on June 25, 1940, resulted in Switzerland being encircled by Axis forces. A second general mobilization was ordered to protect the Jura region between Geneva and Basel. During this period, several aerial incidents resulted in the destruction of 11 German planes by the Swiss Air Force and anti-aircraft artillery. By mid-June, 43,000 men from the 45th French Corps, who had held the Belfort position, were cornered at the Swiss border and interned; they were repatriated in January 1941.

In a letter dated July 12, 1940, General Guisan communicated to the head of the Federal Military Department the rationale behind his decisions in light of the prevailing circumstances. He proposed implementing a tiered protection system comprising three principal levels of defense. The initial level entailed the maintenance of troops at the border, the second involved the blocking of the country's access routes, and the third involved the positioning of troops in the Alps to maintain a defensive position without retreating. He reintroduced the concept of a national redoubt, which he presented to his senior officers on July 25, 1940, during the Grütli report. Beginning in early August, a rotation system was initiated among troops, ensuring a mobilization of 120,000 men.

The national redoubt was situated at the heart of the Saint-Gotthard Massif, which exerted control over the mountain passes that connected the northern and southern Alps. The system was based on three fundamental elements: the fortifications in the Saint-Gotthard Massif, the forts at Saint-Maurice (which controlled access to Italy through the Grand-Saint-Bernard and Simplon Passes), and the fortifications in Sargans (which protected the route to the Saint-Gotthard massif via the Rhine Valley). Furthermore, the various access points to the national redoubt were also safeguarded, including Lake Thun, Lake Lucerne, the Jaun Pass, and the Pays-d'Enhaut to the north, Lake Maggiore and Bellinzona to the south, and the Furka and Oberalp passes for the west-east axis.

In a 1945 report, the Chief of the General Staff articulated the role played by these fortifications during the war. "It seems reasonable to conclude that from 1943 onwards, the fortifications in question played a significant role in the German plans, and it is likely that they contributed to deterring an attack on Switzerland." Despite the lack of serious consideration by the German authorities of the joint German-Italian attack plan, codenamed "Operation Tannenbaum", (Note: Jost 1982, p. 749) Klaus Urner and Georges-André Chevallaz cite the existence of authentic German plans for an attack on Switzerland. Klaus Urner cites a German document from August 1940 that outlines the difficulties of launching an attack due to the challenging terrain and Alpine fortifications. Georges-André Chevallaz refers to a German document from May 1941 that provides directives from the German General Staff for potential military operations against Switzerland.

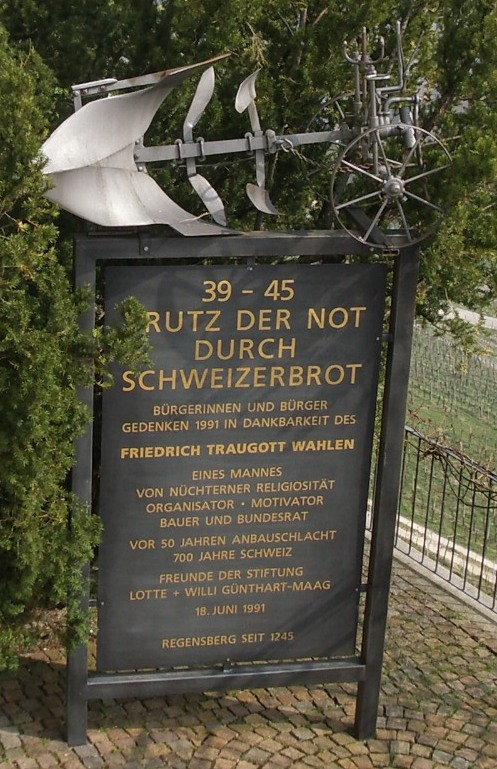
Monument in Regensberg in memory of the Wahlen plan.

Concerning economic and social policy, the government was eager to avoid repeating the missteps of the World War I era concerning economic and social policy. The legal foundations for a war economy were established as early as 1938. (Note: Bouquet 2005, p. 111) In September of the same year, the government introduced a gradual rationing of consumer goods, along with the creation of grain stocks and advice to citizens to stock up on two months' worth of supplies. In December, a compensation system for loss of income was introduced. (Note: Jost 1982, p. 750) Despite these measures to control prices, the press and unions criticized farmers, accusing them of profiting from the black market. Furthermore, a labor shortage by 1940 prompted some women to work, especially in agriculture.

Of all the government initiatives designed to guarantee economic and psychological mobilization within the country, the Wahlen plan proved paramount. Named after agronomist Friedrich Traugott Wahlen, responsible for expanding agriculture, this plan sought to enhance agricultural production and guarantee the country's food self-sufficiency during wartime. The construction of gardens increased in suburban areas, while public parks and sports fields were planted with potatoes.

Although the plan augmented the cultivated area from 183,000 to 352,000 hectares, it failed to attain the initial objective of 500,000 hectares. The country's self-sufficiency level increased from 52% at the inception of the war to 59% by 1945.

=== Diplomatic and economic relations with the Axis powers ===
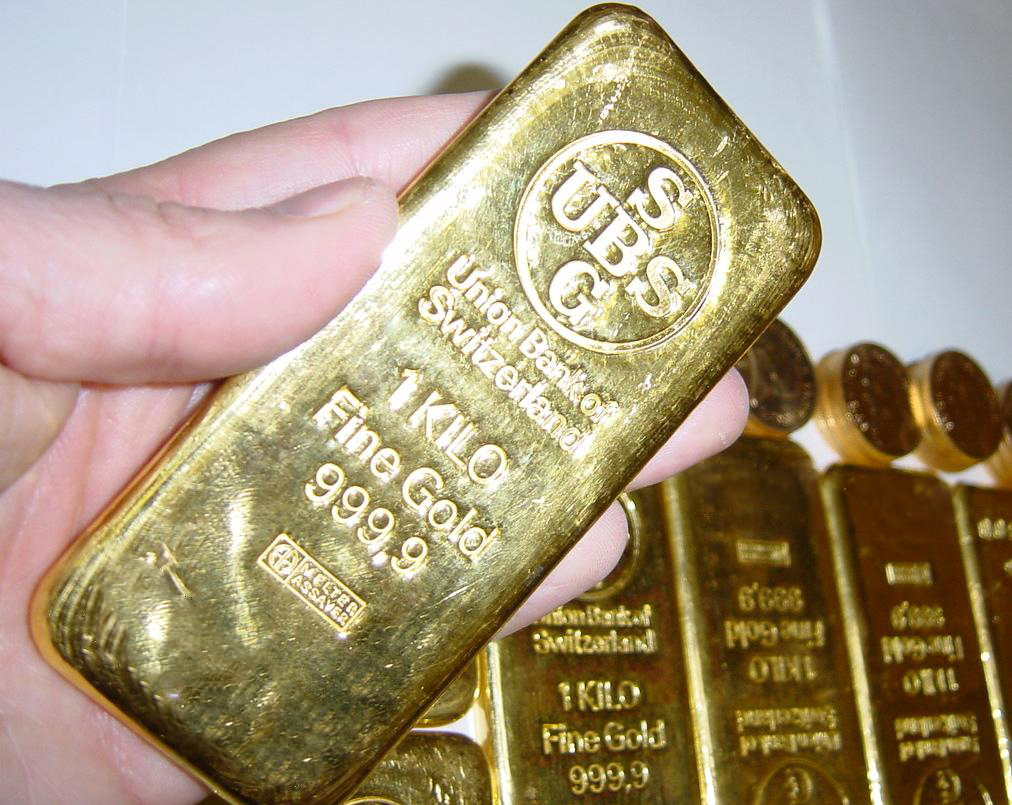
A gold bar from Union Bank of Switzerland.

From the outset of the war, Switzerland's economy exhibited a pronounced alignment with its two Axis neighbors, which absorbed approximately two-thirds of its foreign trade, while only one-tenth of its trade was with the Allies and the remainder was conducted with neutral countries. Of particular note is that 84% of Swiss arms and munitions exports were directed to the Axis, in stark contrast to the mere 8% destined for the Allies.

The diplomatic relations between Switzerland and Germany were frequently subjected to considerable strain during the Second World War, particularly following the decision taken in September 1939 not to acknowledge the legitimacy of newly established states or regimes while maintaining diplomatic relations with those that had existed before the outbreak of hostilities, including Poland, Belgium, and Yugoslavia.

Following the death of Giuseppe Motta in 1940, Vaudois Marcel Pilet-Golaz assumed the head of the Political Department, concurrently serving as President of the Confederation in the same year. On June 25, 1940, he delivered a radio address that was met with controversy. In it, he advocated for the necessary "adaptation" to the new situation and acknowledged the end of the war. However, in private meetings with leaders of the National Movement, he failed to express gratitude to the military and the Swiss army for their efforts and did not mention the terms "democracy" or "neutrality."

Monetary policy emerged as the primary focus of Swiss-Axis relations, superseding other areas of development. Before the war, the Swiss franc, along with the US dollar, the British pound, and gold, constituted one of the principal international currencies. From 1941 onwards, the Swiss franc became the sole stable non-belligerent currency. Moreover, the government did not implement currency controls and required the Swiss National Bank to maintain the franc constant relative to gold and major currencies. Between 1940 and 1945, Germany acquired over 1.2 billion francs' worth of Swiss francs from the national bank in exchange for gold, some of which originated from German reserves but also included gold seized from the Netherlands and Belgium under pressure from occupying forces.

Ultimately, the federal government acquiesced to the German negotiators' demands for advance payments in compensation credits, the value of which steadily increased throughout the war, reaching 119 million francs in 1943. This was a consequence of Switzerland's gradual reduction in exports to Germany, which was influenced by the pressure exerted by the Allied forces. (Note: Jost 1982, p. 753)

In response to this financial support, Great Britain, which regarded the country as "feudal" in relation to Germany, imposed a blockade on three occasions, which resulted in the complete cessation of wheat imports.

=== Domestic policy from 1940 to 1945 ===
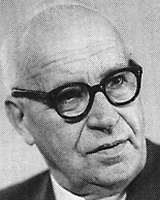
Portrait of Ernst Nob.

As early as July 1940, former fascist movements resurfaced while new ones were created, such as the Gotthard League, established in June. All of these movements proposed different revisions of the institutions modeled on National Socialism, while also advocating for closer ties with Germany. On November 9, 1940, General Guisan proposed to the government that an emissary be sent to Berlin to negotiate. In response to the critical reactions from the press and political parties, the Federal Council banned the Swiss National Movement and the Swiss Communist Party, extended the death penalty from military law to active service, and executed 17 out of 33 individuals convicted of treason. (Note: Jost 1982, pp. 755–756)

In 1943, the federal elections witnessed a notable surge in the popularity of socialist candidates, who were subsequently regarded as the opposition due to their lack of representation in the federal government. The majority of the Federal Assembly expanded the system of concordance to the left by electing Ernst Nobs in December as the first socialist member of the Federal Council. In the spirit of "national unity", the federal authorities established a non-combatant volunteer corps of 20,000 women as early as February 1940. This was the first official acknowledgment of women's equality. This initial recognition of a form of equality led early feminist movements to demand (unsuccessfully) political rights. The first proposal for a law failed in December 1945 before the Federal Assembly. (Note: Jost 1982, p. 758)

The war's turning point in 1942–1943 saw a resurgence of political and social issues that had previously been eclipsed by the perceived dominance of "Swiss totalitarianism." This resurgence led to a surge in political activity, with five popular initiatives submitted in Switzerland during this period. One of these initiatives pertained to family protection, ultimately accepted by 76.3% of voters. On November 25, 1945, the initiative regarding old-age insurance was welcomed by over 80% of voters. On July 6, 1947, the initiative regarding the right to work was also accepted. The initiative regarding labor rights was rejected on May 18, 1947. Finally, the implementation of measures against speculation was denied.

In December 1942, the Swiss Socialist Party published its new program, "The New Switzerland." This program advocated a mixed economy, in which banks and large industries would be nationalized while maintaining notions of private property and a market economy. In response, the Radical Party presented its program focused on social measures in April 1943. The Catholic-Conservative Party, however, preferred to directly oppose the socialist proposals, deeming them unrealistic. (Note: Jost 1982, pp. 760–761)

=== Bergier commission ===
For several years, public opinion highly regarded Switzerland for its conduct during the war. This was due to the country's role in hosting civilian refugees and French, Polish, and later Italian military internees, as well as providing temporary accommodation for nearly 150,000 children, primarily from France, for a few months each year. Nevertheless, these actions were soon met with criticism. It was initially revealed that the Swiss government had ordered the addition of the letter "J" to the passports of German Jews as early as 1938. Subsequently, new allegations emerged from the United States and the World Jewish Congress, claiming that Switzerland's economic assistance had "prolonged the war." However, the most vehement criticism from 1995 was directed at financial institutions that were purported to have held dormant assets belonging to Jewish individuals, which led to the scandal (Note: Bouquet 2005, p. 112) that bears the same name.

In December 1996, the Federal Assembly a commission constituted to examine the historical and legal aspects of the placement of assets in Switzerland before, during, and after World War II. The commission, informally known as the "Bergier Commission", was named after its president, Jean-François Bergier. For its four-year tenure, the commission published approximately twenty reports. The final report, entitled the "Bergier commission", was released to the public on December 19, 2001, coinciding with the dissolution of the commission.

The commission concentrated its attention on Switzerland's and its officials' conduct during World War II concerning dormant funds, gold transactions, and their provenance, as well as the policies governing the reception or rejection of refugees seeking asylum in Switzerland. It ultimately concluded that the policies of the Swiss authorities had played a significant role in the Holocaust's realization. The publication of this report, along with the commission's work, was met with considerable criticism, particularly from the "lived history" movement, which comprises individuals who experienced the war first-hand. These individuals denounced what they perceived as an "obsession with guilt and suspicion" exhibited by the commission in its work.

As a secondary consequence of the commission's activities and following research conducted by the Volker Commission, which was tasked with identifying dormant accounts, Swiss banks were obliged to conclude a global agreement in 1998 with plaintiffs. This agreement entailed the payment of nearly $1.25 billion in compensation, to refund the dormant Jewish assets. (Note: Bouquet 2005, p. 113)

== Switzerland since 1945 ==
=== Economy, energy, and transportation in Switzerland after the war ===
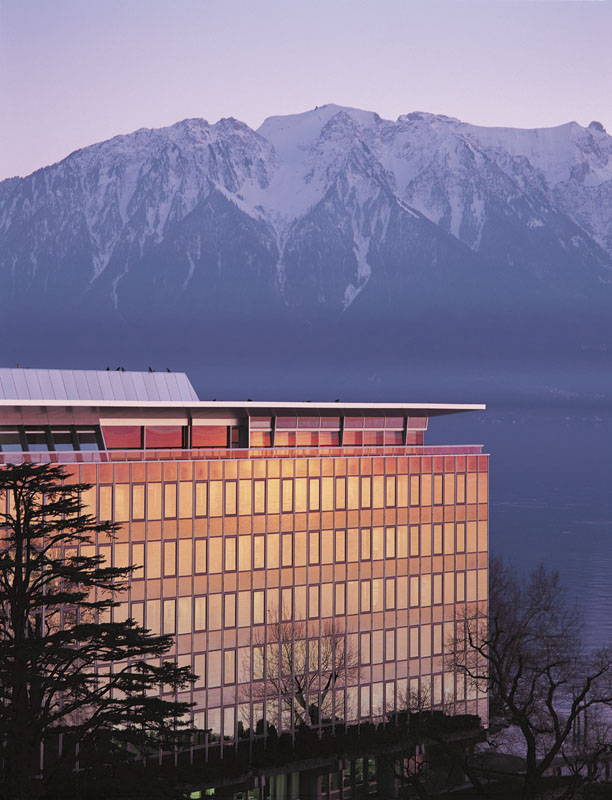
Nestlé headquarters in Vevey.

Following the conclusion of the war, the Swiss economy exhibited robust growth. The country's industry, one of the few in Europe that remained undamaged by the conflict, enabled a swift resumption of production. An ample supply of inexpensive labor from neighboring countries, reasonable taxation, and a notable availability of capital particularly benefited the export industry, conferring a significant competitive advantage over its direct rivals. (Note: Bouquet 2005, p. 114) The internationalization of Swiss banks commenced in the 1950s, with the number of foreign establishments increasing from approximately ten to over one hundred by the end of the 1970s. Concurrently, the value of their balance sheets increased eightfold between 1945 and 1965. The Swiss financial center subsequently became one of the most important in the world, after New York and London, attracting enormous foreign capital. However, while several neighboring countries invested in the essential modernization of their production facilities, the Swiss economy postponed its investments, increasing its productivity only slightly. This was combined with an ever-growing dependency on foreign markets due to the preference for exports, which would have severe repercussions during the onset of the economic crisis in the 1970s. (Note: Gilg & Hablützel 1982, p. 781)

On July 6, 1947, the people approved a federal decree revising the economic articles of the Constitution by 53%. This revision considered two opposing currents: one liberal and anti-interventionist, and the other state-driven and eager to maintain wartime measures. Protectionist measures were particularly taken in the agricultural sector, where the state's desire to maintain a peasant population by guaranteeing prices frequently conflicted with consumers' desires for low-cost products. (Note: Gilg & Hablützel 1982, p. 783)

Until the early 1960s, the substantial deficits in the Swiss trade balance resulting from a notable surge in the import of goods were more than offset by the profits generated by service industries, particularly banking and tourism. (Note: Gilg & Hablützel 1982, p. 785) From this period, a clear inflationary trend and a significant labor shortage indicated a strong economic expansion that abruptly halted during the First Oil Shock in 1973. The recession observed in most countries was further aggravated in Switzerland by the rise of the currency, which became a "haven" (Note: Bouquet 2005, p. 115) between 1970 and 1975, with annual inflation rates exceeding 7.5% each year. This inflationary trend precipitated a wave of economic consolidation across all sectors, giving rise to the gradual emergence of companies that would subsequently become multinationals, such as Nestlé.

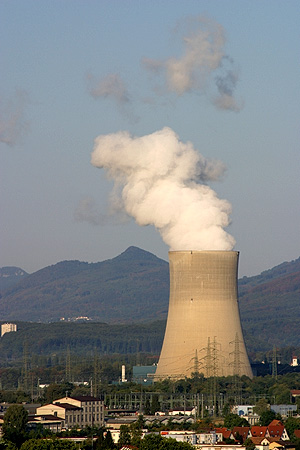
The Gösgen Nuclear Power Plant, Switzerland's first with a cooling tower.

Except for periods of economic downturn, immigration levels remained relatively consistent. Over the century, the country's population expanded exponentially, increasing from 3.3 million in 1900 to 7.2 million in 2000. This growth was largely driven by a significant influx of foreign individuals, primarily from Italy, Spain, and Portugal. This influx resulted in xenophobic protests, particularly during the early 1970s, which prompted the government to restrict the number of work permits granted to foreign nationals. The first Swiss initiative to address concerns about foreign overpopulation, known as the "Schwarzenbach Initiative", which was authored by James Schwarzenbach, was only narrowly defeated by a majority of 54% in 1970.

In terms of energy, the country's needs are increasing rapidly, necessitating the exploration of new sources of supply. While coal and coal gas could still account for 40% of needs just after the war, they represent only a small fraction at the onset of the oil crisis. In contrast, oil and its derivatives experience a significant increase, rising from 25% to 80% in the same period. (Note: Gilg & Hablützel 1982, p. 803) To meet the 110 gigajoules of energy required by each inhabitant in 1970 on an annual basis, many hydroelectric power plants were developed between 1950 and 1970. Among these was the Grande Dixence, which was subsequently augmented by adding five reactors from four nuclear power plants. The first of these, Beznau, was commissioned in 1969. In response to concerns regarding the economy's heavy dependence on foreign sources, a commission was established in 1978 to examine potential avenues for reducing this dependence. The commission explored options such as energy conservation, increasing the use of existing sources, and developing alternative "clean" energies. However, despite these efforts, the proposals put forth by the commission were not implemented, as a 1983 referendum ultimately rejected a proposal deemed too extreme by economic circles and too timid by environmentalists. (Note: Gilg & Hablützel 1982, p. 805)

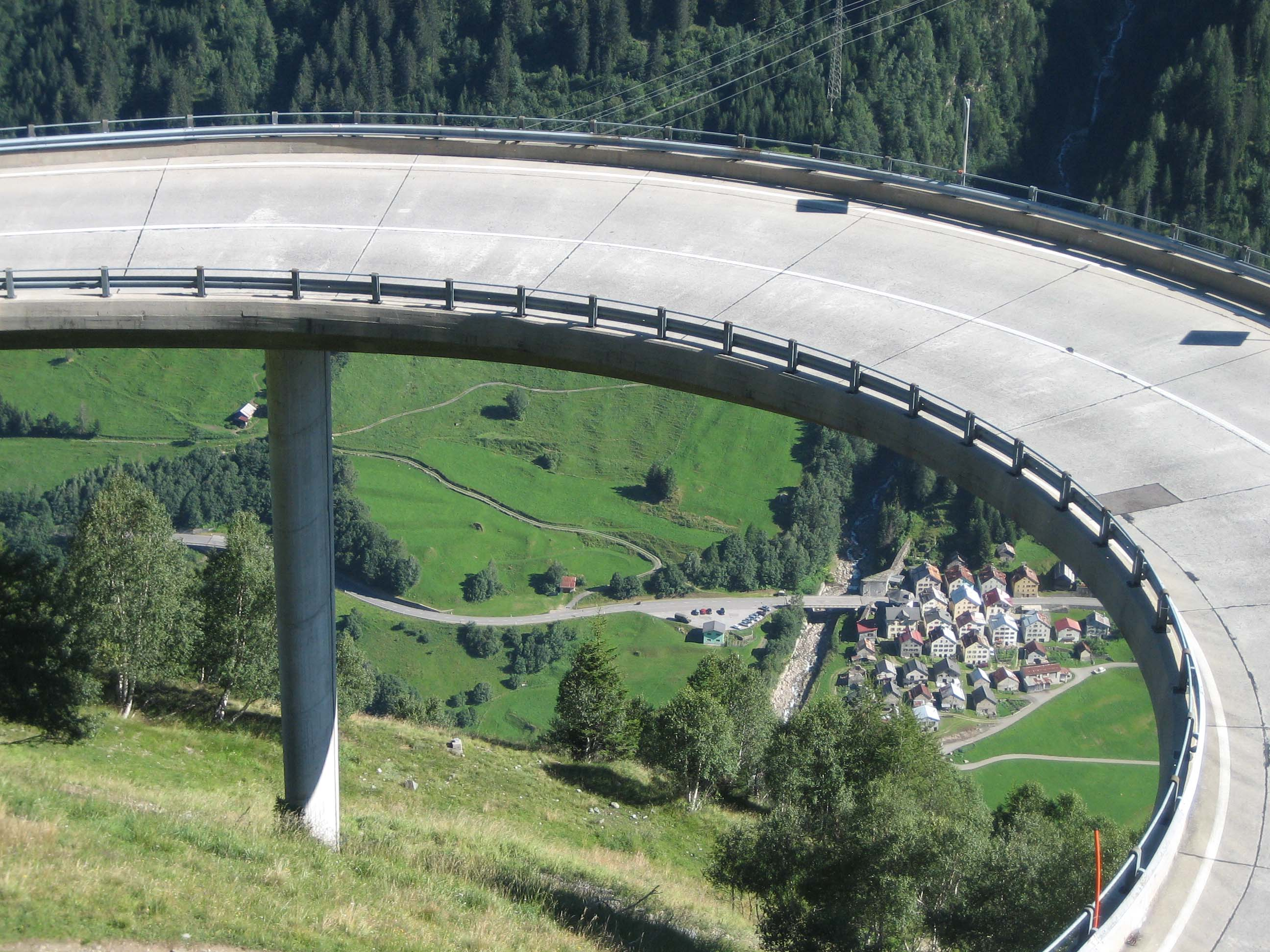
Access ramp to the new Gotthard road in the canton of Tessin.

Regarding transportation, the Swiss rail network remains one of the most densely developed in Europe. However, the elimination of several secondary lines following the decline of smaller companies has led to a reduction in overall network capacity. Nevertheless, new developments are regularly implemented, such as the new Lötschberg tunnels in 2007 or the Saint-Gothard tunnel scheduled for completion in 2020. The development of highways was initially delayed due to economic and political considerations related to cantonal sovereignty over transportation. However, in 1958, the Confederation obtained the authority to oversee the construction of national roads, financed through an additional fuel tax. (Note: Gilg & Hablützel 1982, p. 806) The following year, the first of these highways was constructed. The first of these, connecting Geneva and Lausanne, was opened; subsequently, the highway network was extended across the entire country, including several road tunnels crossing the Alps under the Great St Bernard (opened in 1964) and the Saint-Gothard.

In parallel, there has been a notable surge in air traffic since the conclusion of the conflict. This has been accompanied by the inauguration of two international airports, namely Zurich-Kloten and Geneva-Cointrin, with a third, continental airport between Basel and Mulhouse also opening its doors. However, a third international airport planned for the Bern region has encountered difficulties due to popular opposition. (Note: Gilg & Hablützel 1982, p. 807)

=== Domestic politics: Magic formula and women’s voting rights ===
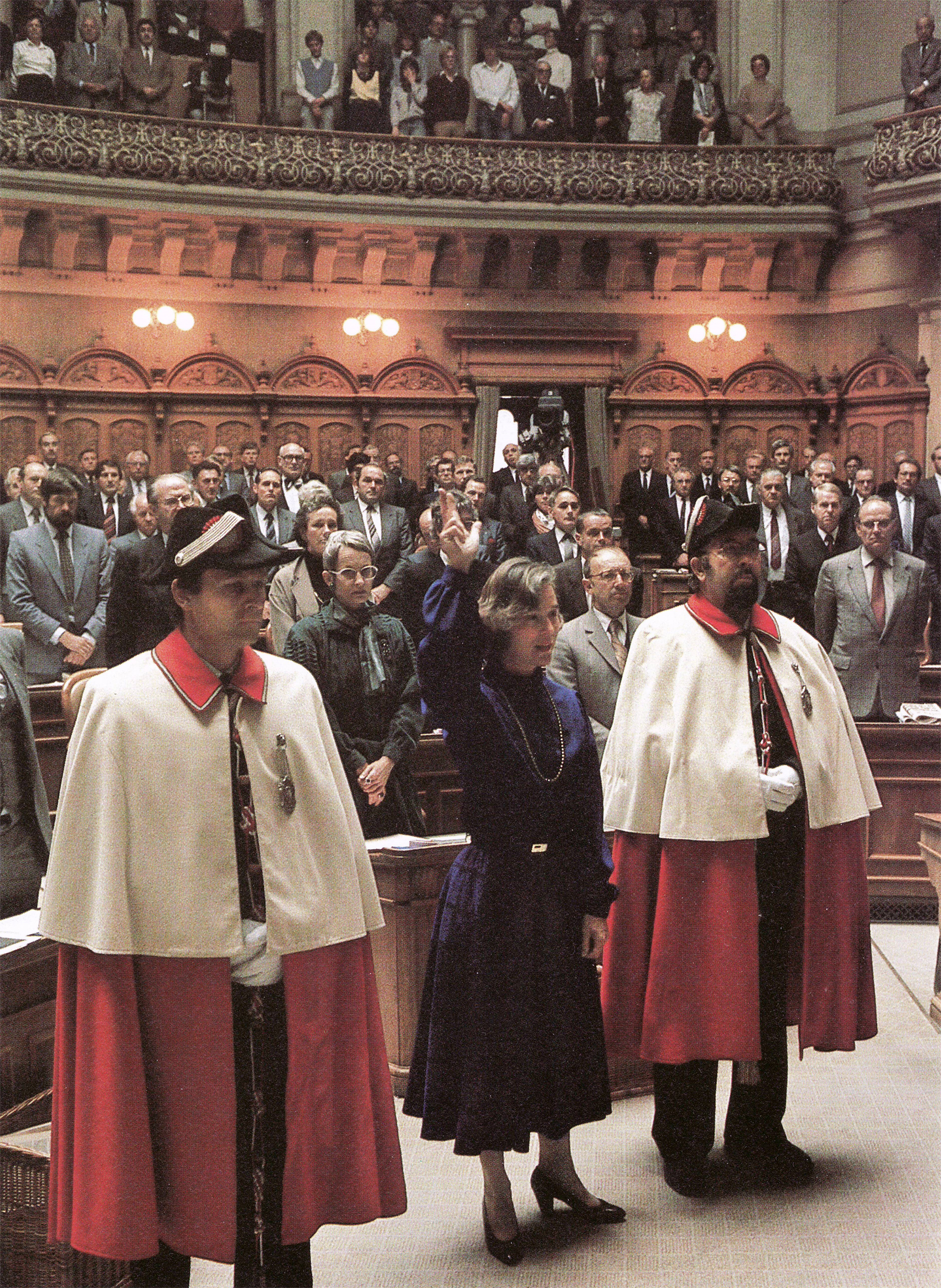
Elisabeth Kopp sworn in at her election to the Federal Council in 1984.

From the conclusion of the war until the end of the 20th century, Switzerland exhibited a notable degree of political stability. The Socialist Federal Councilor Max Weber resigned in 1953 due to the popular rejection by 58% of voters of a new federal financial policy. Furthermore, the Socialist Party refused to assume its position in the federal executive until it had secured two seats. With the support of the Conservative-Catholic Party, it was granted this right in 1959 in Switzerland when the "Magic Formula" (The French translation of the term Zauberformel was first used on December 4, 1959, by the newspaper from Aargau Aargauer Volksblatt (Note: Andrey 2007, p. 469)) was established: the Federal Council is then composed of two radicals, two Christian conservatives, two socialists, and one representative of the Party of Peasants, Artisans, and Burghers (PAB). (Note: Gilg & Hablützel 1982, p. 860) This distribution, which compels Federal Council members to prioritize compromise over confrontation, remains unaltered until December 10, 2003, when the Swiss People's Party, the successor to the PAB, asserts and secures a second seat at the expense of the Christian Democratic Party, itself the successor to the Christian Conservative Party.

Concurrently, a popular vote in 1947 introduced a new article into the constitution that officially states that "the interested economic groups" must be consulted in the development and execution of new economic laws. This consultation is subsequently extended to all areas, with the Federal Council determining which organizations can participate in the consultation processes, thereby minimizing the risks of referendums. (Note: Gilg & Hablützel 1982, p. 861) Ultimately, in 1949, a popular initiative requesting the ability to repeal urgent federal decrees retroactively was accepted by most circumstances. Since this vote, the use of such decrees by the federal government has become exceedingly rare. (Note: Gilg & Hablützel 1982, p. 864)

The expansion of the electorate to include women was finally achieved on February 7, 1971, twelve years after the initial attempt, which ultimately proved unsuccessful, with nearly 70% of voters rejecting the proposed measure. In this regard, the Romandy cantons are more progressive in their approach to women's suffrage. Vaud and Neuchâtel were the first to grant women the right to vote at the cantonal level in 1959, followed the next year by Geneva and then gradually by other cantons. The last canton to adopt this right was Appenzell Innerrhoden, which did so following a Federal Court ruling in 1990.

In the elections held on October 31, 1971, which marked the first time women were eligible to vote, ten women were elected to the National Council. This outcome was subsequently regarded as "spectacular." (Note: Andrey 2007, p. 480) Nevertheless, the integration of women into political institutions will be gradual. In 1986, women represented only 10% of elected officials in the Federal Assembly. The first of them, the Radical Elisabeth Kopp, was not elected to the Federal Council until October 2, 1984.

=== Canton of Jura ===
The official coat of arms of the canton of Jura.

The cantonal structure of the country, inherited from the Confederation of XXII cantons, was confronted with two significant challenges in the northwest during the latter half of the 20th century. In both instances, the aspiration for regional autonomy held greater sway than the economic rationale that favored a larger territorial entity.

The initial challenge pertains to reunifying the two cantons of Basel-Stadt and Basel-Landschaft, which emerged during the financial crisis of the 1930s. The first rejection of the reunification project by the federal chambers in 1947 was followed by a second local popular vote in 1960. Subsequently, a common constituent assembly is formed. Ultimately, the project was rejected in 1969 by the residents of Basel-Country, particularly those from the periphery, who feared that the city would have too much weight in cantonal decisions. (Note: Gilg & Hablützel 1982, p. 878-879)

The question of the Jura was a significant point of contention during this period. Despite the integration of the former Bishopric of Basel into the canton of Bern during French domination, the issue remained unresolved. In 1947, the Bernese government's refusal to appoint The appointment of a Jurassian to head one of the cantonal government departments for linguistic reasons was met with considerable opposition in the region, leading to the formation of the Jurassian Assembly movement, spearheaded by Roland Béguelin. This movement sought to separate Jura from the canton of Bern. Concurrently, other local personalities advocated for autonomy within the canton, while a third group opposed any separation from Bern. (Note: Bouquet 2005, p. 117)

On July 5, 1959, the first cantonal initiative was rejected, including by Jura Sud, French-speaking and Protestant. In response, the North established a militant organization, the "Bélier Group", which engaged in disruptive activities until March 1, 1970. On this date, the voters of the canton approved the initiation of a self-determination process. This process involved each of the six districts organizing a plebiscite to ascertain the will of the people. The three northern districts (Porrentruy, Delémont, and Franches-Montagnes) opted for separation. In contrast, the three southern districts (Courtelary, Moutier, and La Neuveville) and the district of Laufon chose to remain within the Bernese confederation, thereby forming the "Bernese Jura." (Note: Andrey 2007, p. 483) Following the approval of a new constitution by the three separatist districts, a federal vote on September 24, 1978, confirmed the creation of the canton of Jura by an 82.3% majority. This resulted in the canton becoming the 23rd Swiss canton.

=== Switzerland's foreign policy ===
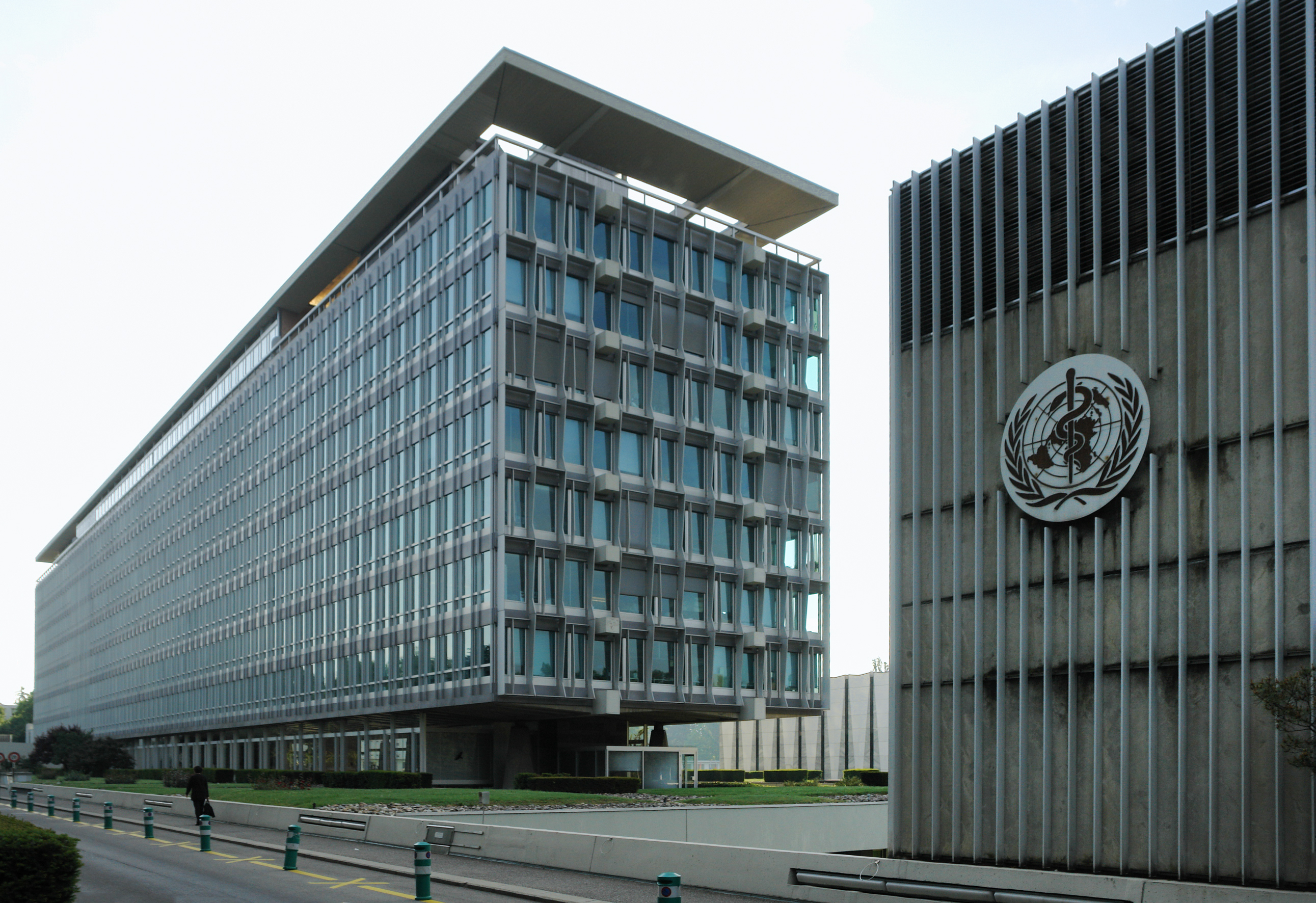
World Health Organization headquarters in Geneva.

Following the conclusion of World War II, Switzerland found itself in a state of isolation due to two key factors. Firstly, the Allied powers expressed their displeasure with the Swiss authorities' stance towards Germany and Italy during the war years. Secondly, Switzerland could not join the newly established United Nations without renouncing its long-standing policy of neutrality. To escape this isolation, the country's foreign policy emphasizes the provision of humanitarian aid, particularly through charitable actions for victims of war and the reception of refugees. Additionally, there is a focus on the promotion of humanitarian organizations. To achieve this, the Federal Council organized an international conference in Geneva in 1949, where four conventions were adopted. These were later supplemented in 1977 and concerned with the protection of victims of war. Concurrently, Switzerland plays an instrumental role in establishing numerous specialized UN organizations, including the International Court of Justice, the ILO, the FAO, the UNDP, the WHO, and UNESCO, the majority of which have their headquarters in Geneva. (Note: Gilg & Hablützel 1982, pp. 891)

The Cold War provided Switzerland, which reestablished diplomatic relations with the Soviet Union as early as 1946, with an opportunity to demonstrate its utility, particularly in 1953 in Korea as a participant in the ceasefire and prisoner repatriation monitoring commissions or in 1961 in Cuba, where it represented US interests. Subsequently, the country also served as Britain's diplomatic representative in Argentina between 1982 and 1990, and the United States' diplomatic representative in Iran starting in 1980.

The country has deliberately chosen to remain outside the process of "European integration", which began in 1957 with the creation of the European Economic Community. However, it was one of the founding members of the European Free Trade Association in 1959 and joined the Council of Europe in 1963. In 1992, the Federal Council submitted an official application for membership in the European Union. However, the application was rejected by the electorate in a popular vote on December 6 of that year, with 50.3% of voters voting against joining the European Economic Area. Subsequently, the Federal Council placed the application on hold and negotiated two series of bilateral agreements on a range of topics, including the free movement of people and diploma recognition, with the European Union. These agreements have been in effect since 2002.

Although the initial proposal was unsuccessful in 1986, with 75.7% of voters rejecting Switzerland's entry into the United Nations, a second attempt was ultimately successful, with 54.6% of voters approving the proposal on March 3, 2002. Consequently, Switzerland became the 190th member state of the UN.

== Bibliography ==
- Andrey, Georges (2007). Histoire de la Suisse pour les nuls (in French). Paris.
- Bouquet, Jean-Jacques (2005). Histoire de la Suisse. Que sais-je ? (in French). Paris: PUF.
- Gilg, Peter; Hablützel, Peter (1982). "Une course accélérée vers l'avenir". Nouvelle Histoire de la Suisse et des Suisses (in French). Translated by Süri, Daniel; Boghossian, Georges; Weibel, Luc. Lausanne: Payot.
- Hug, Ralph; Keller, Stefan (2008). La grève, ça paie ! (PDF) (in French). Union syndicale suisse. Archived from the original on March 6, 2009.
- Jost, Hans-Ulrich (1982). "Menace et repliement". Nouvelle Histoire de la Suisse et des Suisses (in French). Translated by Süri, Daniel. Lausanne: Payot.
- Kuntz, Joëlle (2006). L'Histoire suisse en un clin d'œil. Geneva. pp. fr.
- Nappey, Grégoire (2007). Histoire suisse (in French). Le Mont-sur-Lausanne: LEP.
- Rapin, Jean-Jacques (2004). L'Esprit des fortifications (in French). Lausanne.
- Burnand, Éric; Vaucher, Fanny (2019). Le siècle d'Emma : une famille suisse dans les turbulences du XXe siècle (in French). Antipodes. ISBN 978-2-88901-182-7.
