= Spatial planning in Switzerland =

In Switzerland, spatial planning is the sum total of public policies concerning land use, the organization of the built environment, and the distribution of facilities and activities throughout the geographical space. Given the country's small size, this is an important issue that has been part of the political debate since the 1930s.

Spatial planning is governed by the Spatial Planning Act (SPA) (German: Bundesgesetz über die Raumplanung - RPG, French: Loi fédérale sur l’aménagement du territoire - LAT, Italian: Legge federale sulla pianificazione del territorio - LPT). Its main features are federalism, the separation of building and agricultural zones, and restrictions on the construction of second homes (Lex Weber adopted following an initiative).

== Definition, aims and principles ==
Spatial planning in Switzerland is outlined by Article 75 of the Federal Constitution, which mandates "prudent and measured land use" and "rational land occupation". It additionally allocates roles to both the Confederation and the cantons: the Confederation is charged with establishing framework legislation and coordinating the efforts of the cantons, while also taking into account its own planning needs. Accordingly, the cantons bear primary responsibility for planning their respective territories.

Article 1 of the Spatial Planning Act (SPA) sets out the aims of spatial planning. These guidelines, partially prescribed by the Constitution, include the following: a careful distribution of land use; a distinction between the parts of a territory that are suitable for construction and those that are not; the protection of natural resources such as soil, air, water, forests, and landscapes; a focus on urbanization that maintains a high standard of living within built environments; the creation of a dense and efficient urban infrastructure, with a positive environment for economic development; a commitment to judicious decentralization of urbanization and economic activity.

The principles of spatial planning are outlined in Article 3 of the SPA, providing further insight into its objectives. These principles specifically address: Land use should prioritize the protection of both the landscape and the environment, while also ensuring the preservation of sufficient high-quality arable land, particularly for crop rotation. Forests should be maintained in their various functions, and there should be an emphasis on promoting the quality of the built environment. The distribution of living and working areas should be planned judiciously, with priority given to sites with adequate public transportation links. Additionally, underutilized and wasteland areas should be better utilized. Landscapes and historically significant built sites should be conserved and suitable locations for public buildings and installations, or those of public interest, should be determined. Access to the banks of lakes and watercourses should be free and cycle paths and footpaths should be created and maintained.

== History ==
=== Initial discussions ===
The development of spatial planning in Switzerland can be traced to urban planning, river regulation and land improvement, nature conservation and heritage protection movements, as well as economic and social challenges during the 1920s and 1930s. Between 1918 and 1920, Hans Bernhard, one of the pioneers of Swiss land development, proposed the utilization of land to address the country's supply shortages. He advocated for the decentralization of industries and the agricultural development of underused or unexploited territories. Additionally, he called for the establishment of a federal housing law. In 1933, the issue of a coordinated regional planning policy was raised by Lucerne architect Armin Meili during a series of conferences in Switzerland. Meili proposed the creation of a national plan for regional planning. In 1970, Meili published an article in L'Autoroute titled "Allgemeines über Landesplanung", which proposed a land use plan for the entire country, including the goal of creating a linear city in the central country between St. Gallen and Geneva. More specifically, the early planners achieved major successes in social housing, public facilities, and expanding communal territories by absorbing outlying communities in Zurich and Geneva.

During World War II, a federal spatial planning policy was explicitly called for. In 1937, a group of individuals, primarily architects and engineers, established a private commission for spatial planning, despite considerable doubt about any form of planning. In 1941, Armin Meili, a Radical National Councillor, presented a motion to receive federal funding for the commission. In 1943, the interested parties founded the Association Suisse pour l'Aménagement National (ASPAN) to follow the commission. The Federal Council declined to pass legislation on the issue, even with a cantonal initiative from Solothurn in 1943 to grant federal authority to plan the national transport network.

Prior to the 1950s, there were no significant restrictions on construction, allowing every landowner to build on their plot. Consequently, urbanization was scattered and disorganized. Presently, there is a surge in land speculation that exacerbates housing shortages and ineffective land usage. As per the authorities, state intervention is becoming more and more imperative.

Switzerland's federalist structure means that each level of government can only act within its own jurisdiction. The Confederation lacks the authority to make overarching laws. Coordination towards a common policy was established gradually over time. In 1957, the Water Protection Act - WPA (German: Bundesgesetz über den Schutz der Gewässer - GSchG, French: Loi fédérale sur la protection des eaux - LEaux, Italian: Legge federale sulla protezione delle acque - LPAc) mandated the connection of wastewater pipes to a sewer system. As a result, the initial building zones were concentrated in areas with existing sewer infrastructure to save property owners the expense of connecting. The Confederation possesses sectoral powers that allow it to influence land-use planning, including forest area protection, rental markets, and railroad planning, but this is insufficient for regulating the entire zone. There are some cantonal initiatives that address the issue, but they lack coordination.

=== Creating a federal jurisdiction ===
In September 1967, the Federal Council proposed the adoption of two new constitutional provisions (Articles 22.3 and 22.4 (Note: These articles became articles 26 (Guarantee of ownership) and 75 (Spatial planning) respectively when the Federal Constitution was revised in 1999.)) by the Federal Assembly. The first provision grants the Confederation with clear authority in the area of town and country planning, separate from that of the cantons, hence permitting the creation of zoning plans. The second provision formalizes the guarantee of property ownership recognized by the Federal Court for several years. In 1969, this constitutional amendment was narrowly accepted by the people. To prevent the excessive deterioration of the territory while awaiting the adoption and implementation of a federal law, an urgent federal decree was put into effect in March 1972, which included provisional zoning for the entire country. This action and the publishing of works that presented a guiding concept for regional planning prompted opposition from real estate circles and groups defending federalism, with the Ligue vaudoise leading the charge. The federal law passed in 1974 was voted down in a 1976 referendum. A revised, diluted version of the law wasn't enacted until 1980.

Founded in 1980, the Federal Office for Spatial Development aimed to accomplish several tasks in its initial years of operation. These tasks included introducing fundamental concepts like "equipped land" into all cantons' practices, coordinating cantonal master plans, preventing construction outside building zones, and imposing quotas for arable land. Moreover, cantonal services must persuade communes to decrease their building areas, which were excessively carved up in the 1960s and 1970s. On another level, professionals and administrators must coordinate policies on transportation, regional development (especially in mountainous areas), conservation of nature and monuments, and environmental protection with those of land use planning to effectively manage the land.

The new zoning legislation has been well-assimilated by the communities. On the other hand, the measures related to collective land management, including the right of preemption or the right to build, or the levying of land value gains, have not been practically applied. The "town-country" initiative, aimed at promoting owner-occupied property, was largely unsuccessful in the 1988 referendum. The phenomenon of peri-urbanization, coupled with the challenges faced by urban centers in maintaining their demographic growth, underscored the growing importance of regional planning during the 1990s.

=== In the 21st century ===
At the start of the 21st century, the cantons were obligated to create a master plan for approval by the Federal Council. Additionally, the Confederation prepared sectoral plans for areas within its scope, including the conservation of arable land and transportation. In collaboration with the cantons, towns, and municipalities between 2006 and 2008, the federal authorities devised the "Swiss Spatial Project." Since 2001, the federal government has committed to a four-year program to support agglomeration projects, in response to a long-standing demand from cities.

Regulatory planning faces familiar challenges: numerous municipalities boast excessively large building areas while using their autonomy as a shield; opposition from private parties hinders progress; car dependency, home ownership aspirations, and declining agricultural activity encourage dispersion of the population outside urban areas, amplifying land pressure on non-building zones.

In response to these trends, professionals in urban planning and environmental sectors, as well as select parties and organizations, are advocating for increased reliance on walking, cycling, and public transportation. Additionally, there is a push for densification of areas that have already been built upon, primarily through the reclamation of brownfield sites. This movement also values the preservation of architectural heritage and respect for natural landscapes, all with the aim of promoting sustainable development. In 2008, the Federal Council proposed a law revision in response to a popular initiative that demanded a freeze on building zones. The revision proposed more restrictive measures to curb the dispersal of construction.

=== Tools ===
A master plan defines the development strategy for a particular area, exclusively binding the authorities, and consequently, private entities cannot contest it.

On the other hand, an allocation plan indicates the authorized uses of parcels within a specific perimeter, and as a result, it binds both public leaders and private individuals, who reserve the right to oppose it.

Declassification is a process where the cantonal authority changes a buildable zone into a non-buildable one. This modification provides the right to financial compensation for expropriation if certain requirements, as per the Barret ruling, are met. Non-classification, on the other hand, is a type of declassification that doesn't entitle compensation except in specific circumstances since the authority has followed the SPA (Spatial Planning Act), and it was never supposed to be buildable land.

== See also ==
- Environmental movement in Switzerland
