= Full powers regime in Switzerland =

Swiss emergency powers regime

In Switzerland, the full powers regime (German: Vollmachtenregime; French: pleins pouvoirs; Italian: pieni poteri) is extra-constitutional emergency law under which far-reaching powers to take measures and issue ordinances are conferred on the government, the Federal Council, in a severe crisis. It was last applied during the Second World War on the basis of a federal decree of 30 August 1939, and the Federal Assembly repealed the last full-powers decrees by the end of 1952. The Federal Council had already received extraordinary full powers on several occasions between 1849 and 1936. The legality of the regime was disputed, but Swiss legal practice regards it as lawful.

== Concept ==
Severe crises such as wars, natural disasters, social unrest or recessions can challenge the Rechtsstaat (the state under the rule of law). Its main instrument of action is the formal statute, together with the administrative rulings based on it. In a severe crisis, however, passing a statute takes too much time. For this reason, democratic constitutional states have developed the practice of meeting such extraordinary challenges with an "extra-constitutional emergency law of the state" (extrakonstitutionelles Staatsnotrecht), the full powers regime. Under it, the government is given far-reaching powers to take measures and issue ordinances. The term extra-constitutional emergency law of the state makes clear that the polity is in a state of emergency because it sees its existence threatened by internal or external dangers. This law is extra-constitutional, that is, it stands outside the constitution. The full powers regime must not be confused with the urgent legislative procedure, which merely excludes the referendum or postpones it until after the act has come into force.

== History ==
In Switzerland, extra-constitutional emergency law was last applied during the Second World War, and it entered constitutional history as the full powers regime. Extraordinary full powers had, however, already been conferred on the Federal Council earlier: in 1849 during the unrest in Baden (Badener Wirren), in 1853 in the Ticino affair concerning relations with Austria, in 1856 in the Neuchâtel Crisis, in 1859 during the war of independence in northern Italy, in 1860 in the Savoy affair (Savoyerhandel), in 1866 in the Austro-Prussian War, in 1870 in the Franco-Prussian War, in 1914 in the First World War and in 1936 in the Great Depression.

The term full powers regime refers above all to the events of the Second World War. The federal decree of 30 August 1939 on measures to protect the country and to maintain neutrality (Bundesbeschluss über Massnahmen zum Schutze des Landes und zur Aufrechterhaltung der Neutralität) conferred on the Federal Council extraordinary powers that normally belong only to parliament (Article 3). For this purpose the Federal Council received an unlimited credit (Article 4). It had to report to the Federal Assembly every June and December, and the Assembly reserved to itself the decision on whether the measures taken should remain in force (Article 5). The Federal Council was also assisted by the two standing full-powers committees (Vollmachtenkommissionen), which acted as a link between the Federal Council and parliament (Article 6). The decree could not be based on the constitution, because it allowed the Federal Council to issue law-making ordinances without a basis in statute or in the constitution. It formed, as it were, a constitution alongside the constitution, which posed a great danger to democracy and the rule of law. In view of the existential threat, however, this was accepted.

The Federal Council interpreted the full powers of 1939 broadly and based countless measures on them, among them the introduction of a direct federal tax. In 1949 the popular initiative "Return to Direct Democracy", which conservative federalists of the Ligue vaudoise had submitted, indirectly led the Federal Assembly to repeal the last full-powers decrees by the end of 1952.

== Legal debate ==
Zaccaria Giacometti considered the emergency-law regime illegal: the rule of law stood or fell with the constitution, and the full powers regime was merely a maxim of reason of state. To solve the problem, he proposed adding an emergency article (Notstandsartikel) to the constitution. Giacometti's view did not, however, prevail in Swiss state practice; the opposing position of Dietrich Schindler dominated. The Federal Constitution still contains no emergency article. Swiss legal practice regards the full powers regime as lawful and upholds it, notably the Federal Supreme Court in its judgment of 2000 on the claim brought by Joseph Spring.

== Bibliography ==
- Zaccaria Giacometti, Das Vollmachtenregime der Eidgenossenschaft, 1945
- André Manuel, Les pleins pouvoirs en droit public fédéral suisse, 1953
- Andreas Kley, Verfassungsgeschichte der Neuzeit: Grossbritannien, die USA, Frankreich und die Schweiz, 2004 (4th ed. 2020)
