= 1947 Swiss referendums =

Three referendums were held in Switzerland during 1947. The first was held on 18 May on a popular initiative for "economic reform and rights concerning work", and was rejected by voters. The second and third were both held on 6 July on revising the articles of the federal constitution covering the economy and a federal law on aged and bereavement insurance. Both were approved by voters.

== Background ==
The May referendum, which was a popular initiative, and the July referendum on amending the constitution, which was a mandatory referendum, both required a double majority; a majority of the popular vote and majority of the cantons. The decision of each canton was based on the vote in that canton. Full cantons counted as one vote, whilst half cantons counted as half. The July referendum on the federal law on aged and bereavement insurance was an optional referendum, which required only a simple majority of votes in favour.

== Results ==
=== May: Popular initiative on economic reform and work rights ===
Choice	Popular vote		Cantons		
Choice	Votes	%	Full	Half	Total
For	244,415	31.2	0	0	0
Against	539,244	68.8	19	6	22
Blank votes	24,694	–	–	–	–
Invalid votes	2,734	–	–	–	–
Total	811,088	100	19	6	22
Registered voters/turnout	1,364,771	59.4	–	–	–
Source: Nohlen & Stöver

=== July: Constitutional amendment ===
Choice	Popular vote		Cantons		
Choice	Votes	%	Full	Half	Total
For	556,803	53.0	11	2	12
Against	494,414	47.0	8	4	10
Blank votes	39,695	–	–	–	–
Invalid votes	1,937	–	–	–	–
Total	1,092,849	100	19	6	22
Registered voters/turnout	1,371,760	79.7	–	–	–
Source: Nohlen & Stöver

=== July: Aged and bereavement insurance ===
Choice	Votes	%
For	862,036	80.0
Against	215,496	20.0
Blank votes	13,573	–
Invalid votes	1,744	–
Total	1,092,849	100
Registered voters/turnout	1,371,760	79.7
Source: Nohlen & Stöver
