= Economic articles of the Swiss Federal Constitution =

Swiss constitutional economic provisions

The economic articles (German: Wirtschaftsartikel; French: articles économiques) of the Swiss Federal Constitution are, in the broader sense, all of its provisions that govern the relationship between the state and the economy. In the narrower sense, the term refers to the constitutional provisions that the people approved on 6 July 1947 with 53% of the votes. They were based on a bill passed by parliament in 1939, and they anchored existing corporatist elements in the constitution. In the Federal Constitution of 1999, the economic articles are integrated into Articles 94–104 (Economy) and Article 110 (Labor).

== Background ==
In Article 31 paragraph 1, the revised Federal Constitution of 1874 had extended the earlier freedom of trade (Article 29 paragraph 1 of the constitution of 1848) into a freedom of trade and industry (Handels- und Gewerbefreiheit) that was comprehensive in principle. However, the emergency law of the full powers regime in force since the First World War, together with cartels and de facto monopolies, largely suspended this freedom. For this reason, and in view of the Great Depression, a movement for revision began in the 1930s. The bill passed by the federal parliament in 1939 did not come into force because of the Second World War, but it formed the basis of the economic articles adopted in 1947.

== Provisions ==
The economic articles were approved by the people in the popular vote of 6 July 1947 with 53% of the votes, thanks among other things to clear majorities in almost all the cantons of French-speaking Switzerland and in Ticino. They amended Articles 31, 32, 32quater paragraph 2 and 34ter, added Articles 31bis to 31quinquies, and repealed Article 6 of the transitional provisions.

Article 31 protected the freedom of trade and industry, subject to steering measures anchored in the constitution. In particular, the Confederation was empowered to take measures against economically or socially harmful effects of cartels, for the "preservation of a healthy farming class" and for the protection of economically threatened regions (Article 31bis). In exceptional cases the cantons could also depart from the freedom of trade and industry (Article 31 paragraph 2, and Article 31ter paragraph 1 on the hospitality trade). Article 34ter contained no specific reservation regarding the freedom of trade and industry, which showed that social policy measures were regarded as compatible with it in principle. The economic articles of 1947 anchored existing corporatist elements in the constitution, among them the involvement of the economic associations in preparing and implementing legislation and the possibility of declaring collective labor agreements generally binding (Article 32 paragraph 3, Article 34ter).

== Later developments ==
With the amendment of 1978, Article 31quinquies was changed from an article on combating crises into an article on business-cycle policy (Konjunkturartikel). In view of the development of international economic law, and as a member of the World Trade Organization, the Confederation as legislator has oriented itself increasingly toward competition, especially since the 1990s; among other things, cartel law was tightened in 1995. Only the provisions on agricultural policy and on national economic supply remained interventionist in character. In the Federal Constitution of 1999, the economic articles are fully integrated into Articles 94–104 (Economy) and Article 110 (Labor).

== Bibliography ==
- H. P. Christen, Die Wirtschaftsverfassung des Interventionismus, 1970, 243–319
- H. Huber, "Rückblick auf die 'neuen' Wirtschaftsartikel der Bundesverfassung", in Schweizerische Wirtschaftspolitik zwischen Gestern und Morgen, ed. E. Tuchtfeld, 1976, 57–72
- D.-C. Dicke, T. Fleiner-Gerster (eds.), Staat und Gesellschaft, 1987, 117–143
- K. A. Vallender, Wirtschaftsfreiheit und begrenzte Staatsverantwortung, 3rd ed., 1995, 165–173
- F. Gygi, P. Richli, Wirtschaftsverfassungsrecht, 2nd ed., 1997
