= Federal Office for Spatial Development =

Swiss federal agency

Coordinates: 46°58′25″N 7°28′48″E

- (in German) Bundesamt für Raumentwicklung (in French) Office fédéral du développement territorial (in Italian) Ufficio federale dello sviluppo territoriale

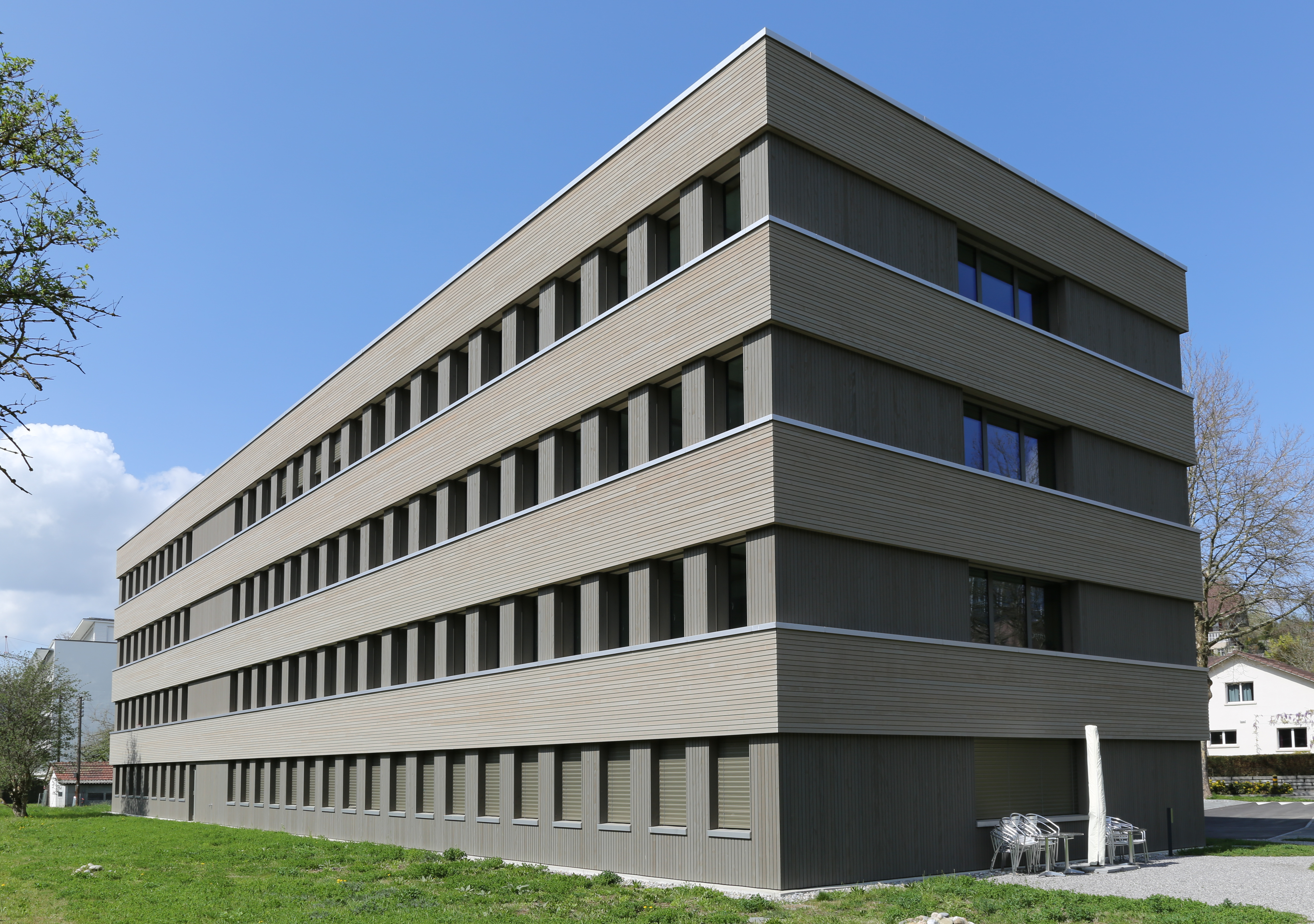
- Building at Worblentalstrasse 66

Agency overview
- Formed: 1 June 2000
- Jurisdiction: Federal administration of Switzerland
- Headquarters: Ittigen
- Minister responsible: Simonetta Sommaruga, Federal Councillor
- Parent agency: Federal Department of Environment, Transport, Energy and Communications
- Website: www.are.admin.ch

The Federal Office for Spatial Development (ARE) (Note: German: Bundesamt für Raumentwicklung; French: Office fédéral du développement territorial; Italian: Ufficio federale dello sviluppo territoriale) is a Swiss federal office. Its acronym, ARE, is used in all languages and derives from the office's German name.

Created on June 1, 2000, the office is responsible for spatial planning, transport coordination and sustainable development. It also manages issues relating to the Alpine Convention. It reports to the Federal Department of the Environment, Transport, Energy and Communications, and is based in Ittigen.

== History ==
In 1972, the Federal Council created the post of Delegate for Spatial Planning. In 1980, the Federal Office for Land Use Planning (Note: German: Bundesamt für Raumplanung; French: Office fédéral de l'aménagement du territoire) was created.

The Federal Office for Spatial Development came into being on June 1, 2000, bringing together under one roof the tasks of the Federal Office for Land Use Planning, and the services for Transport Planning, Sustainable Development and the Alpine Convention.

== Directors ==
- 2000-2008: Pierre-Alain Rumley
- Since 2009: Maria Lezzi

== Full-time positions since 2001 ==
Raw data

"Federal Finance Administration FFA: State financial statements".
"Federal Finance Administration FFA: Data portal".

== See also ==
- Spatial planning in Switzerland
