= Federal decree =

Act belonging to the Swiss legislation

A federal decree (German: Bundesbeschluss; French: Arrêté fédéral, Italian: Decreto Federale) is an act that can be adopted by the Swiss Federal Assembly in application of a federal law, insofar as the text does not contain rules of law (art. 163 para. 2), meaning that it can only be a decision on the application of general and abstract norms laid down in the law.

The Federal Constitution of 1874 (art. 89 para. 2) introduced the possibility of adopting a federal decree of general application. The difference with an ordinary federal law lies in the "emergency clause" and the limited duration of the decree.

The 1999 Federal Constitution confirmed this configuration, even though the form of a federal law may also be used. The difference lies in the facultative referendum (German: fakultatives Referendum; French: référendum facultatif, Italian: referendum facoltativo, Romansh: referendum facultativ). In the case of a decree, a referendum is only possible if provided for in the Constitution or by law (art. 141 para. 1 let. c); this is referred to as an administrative referendum. Furthermore, it is not covered by the rule laid down in article 189 of the Constitution concerning an appeal to the Federal Supreme Court.

== See also ==
- Federal act (Switzerland)
- Politics of Switzerland

== Bibliography ==
- Auer, Andreas; Malinverni, Giorgio; Hottelier, Michel (2000). Stämpfli (ed.). Droit constitutionnel suisse [Swiss constitutional law] (in French). Vol. 1: L'État. Bern.
