= Marcel Regamey =

Swiss essayist and journalist (1905–1982)

Marcel Regamey (1905–1982) was a Swiss essayist and journalist from the Canton of Vaud.

== Works ==
- La protection de la personnalité en droit civil : essai de critique et de synthèse, 1929

Dans les cahiers Ordre et Tradition, publiés à Lausanne :

- L'ordre dans l'État, No 1, 1926
- Esquisse d'un régime d'intérêt national, No 9, 1929
- Essai sur le Gouvernement personnel, No 12, 1931

Dans les Cahiers de la Renaissance vaudoise, publiés à Lausanne :

- Les problèmes de l'histoire vaudoise, No 14 et No 15, 1935
- Propriété et liberté, No 29, 1946
- Action libre, déterminisme moral et plan providentiel, No 30–31, 1948
- Le Mythe du Golfe, No 36, 1960
- La gauche et la droite, No 50, 1968
- Évangile et politique, No 85, 1973
- La consécration de la Cathédrale de Lausanne le 19 octobre 1275 et l'unité de l'Europe chrétienne, No 87, 1975, et Lausanne, Centre de recherches européennes, 1975
- Études fédéralistes, No 95, 1978, pp. 41–61 : "Le fédéralisme vaudois"
- Par quatre chemins, No 100, 1980
- La formation de l'État dans les six cantons romands, No 104, 1982
- La plume de Marcel Regamey, Articles de La Nation (1931-1982), choisis sous la direction de Philibert Muret, No 117, 1989

== Bibliography ==
- William Hentsch (dir.), Le chemin de Marcel Regamey, Sa vie, ses écrits, son action, Cahiers de la Renaissance vaudoise, No 116, 1989 (illustrations, index, bibliographie)
- Jean-Jacques Langendorf, Monarchie, politique et théologie chez Marcel Regamey, suivi du discours prononcé lors de la réception du Prix Michel Dentan, Cahiers de la Renaissance vaudoise, No 137, 2001; paru aussi dans le Bulletin Charles Maurras, n°13
- Roland Butikofer, Le refus de la modernité, La Ligue vaudoise: une extrême droite et la Suisse (1919-1945), Payot, Lausanne, 1996 (thèse), ISBN 260103193X
- Françoise Fornerod, Lausanne, Le temps des audaces, Payot, Lausanne, 1993, pp. 60–65 (et l'index, p. 431)
- Bertil Galland, Princes des marges, Ed. 24 heures / Coopérative Migros, Lausanne, 1991, chap. XIII
