= Federal Direct Tax =

Type of Swiss tax

The Federal Direct Tax (FDT) is a Swiss direct income tax. It is the main source of revenue for the federal government, followed by the value-added tax (VAT), which represent respectively 34.3% and 32.1% of the total tax receipts as of 2022.

There is no wealth tax at the federal level; it is levied only by the cantons and municipalities.

== History ==
The FTA was created in 1915, levied under the control of the cantons for the benefit of the Swiss Confederation in the context of the First World War. It was then called "war tax" (1916-1917), later called "new extraordinary war tax" (1921-1932), "crisis tax" (1934-1940), and "national defence tax" from 1941. The current name of FTA was adopted in the 1983/1984 tax period.

Intended to be a temporary tax, it is renewable by vote, the last deadline being 2020. In 2018, the people agreed to renew it from 2020 until 2035 under the name "Financial Regime 2021.
