= Urgency clause in Switzerland =

Swiss procedure for urgent legislation

In Switzerland, the urgency clause (German: Dringlichkeitsklausel; French: clause d'urgence; Italian: clausola d'urgenza) allows acts of the Federal Assembly to enter into force immediately instead of waiting for a possible referendum. The Federal Constitution of 1874 excluded the referendum in urgent cases. Rules governing the clause were added to the Constitution as Article 89bis after the popular initiative "Return to Direct Democracy" was accepted in 1949, and the Constitution of 1999 contains it as urgent legislation (Article 165).

== History ==
Since 1874, laws adopted by the Federal Assembly have been subject to a popular referendum, which suspends their entry into force and so lengthens the legislative procedure. Some situations, however, call for prompt action by parliament. The Federal Constitution of 1874 (Article 89) excluded the referendum in cases of urgency. Rules governing the urgency clause were introduced by the popular initiative "Return to Direct Democracy", launched in 1946. Despite the opposition of the Federal Assembly and the Federal Council, the initiative was accepted on 11 September 1949, and a new Article 89bis was added to the Constitution.

In the Constitution of 1999, the urgency clause appears under the heading of urgent legislation (Gesetzgebung bei Dringlichkeit; législation d'urgence; Article 165). The urgent federal decree (dringlicher Bundesbeschluss; arrêté urgent) used under the Constitution of 1874 was replaced by the urgent law (dringliches Gesetz; loi urgente).

== Procedure ==
Under Article 89bis, a special majority of the members of each of the two chambers, and not merely of those voting, is required to make normative acts subject to the urgency clause; the duration of such acts must be limited from the outset. This means 101 votes in the National Council and 24 in the Council of States. The clause allows such acts to enter into force immediately, and it excludes the referendum for laws whose duration is limited to one year. Laws of longer duration remain subject to the referendum, which is then held on acts that are already in force. If it leads to the rejection of an urgent law, the referendum has an abrogative effect: it ends the act's existence one year after its adoption, and the act cannot be renewed. The referendum is optional when the law conforms to the Constitution, and mandatory when it does not. Recourse to the urgency clause has made it possible to deal quickly with sensitive matters such as the restoration of public finances, the fight against inflation, unemployment insurance and the right of asylum.

== Bibliography ==
- E. Grisel, "Article 89bis", in Commentaire de la Constitution fédérale de la Confédération suisse du 29 mai 1874, 1987 (with bibliography)
- A. Auer et al., Droit constitutionnel suisse, 2 vols., 2000 (with bibliography)
- K. Sutter-Somm, "Artikel 165", in Die schweizerische Bundesverfassung, 2002 (with bibliography)
- J.-F. Aubert, "Article 165", in Petit commentaire de la Constitution fédérale de la Confédération suisse du 18 avril 1999, 2003 (with bibliography)
