= 1936 devaluation of the Swiss franc =

Swiss currency devaluation

The 1936 devaluation of the Swiss franc was decided by the Swiss Federal Council on 26 September 1936, after the French government had decided to devalue the French franc. Switzerland had joined the gold bloc in 1933. In January 1936 it had 124,000 unemployed; the export industry and the hotel and tourism sector argued for devaluation, while the Swiss National Bank (SNB) and the majority of the Federal Council held to the gold parity of the franc. The SNB set the rate of devaluation at 30%. In the following years exports rose and unemployment fell.

== Background ==
At the beginning of the 1930s the Great Depression brought an extraordinary influx of foreign capital into Switzerland, and the franc took on the role of a safe haven. The trend reversed in 1933. On several occasions (spring and summer 1933, spring 1934, spring 1935) the Swiss National Bank had to defend the franc against speculative attacks. Unlike the United Kingdom and the United States, which devalued their currencies and abandoned the gold standard, Switzerland joined France, the Netherlands, Belgium, Italy and Poland in July 1933 in creating the gold bloc. At the Department of Finance, both Jean-Marie Musy (until March 1934) and Albert Meyer (from then on) were determined supporters of keeping the gold standard and of a deflationary policy.

In January 1936 Switzerland had 124,000 unemployed. This situation led the export industry, in particular the Vorort, the hotel and tourism sector and the former federal councillor Edmund Schulthess to argue for devaluation. In the Social Democratic Party the majority opposed it, but Max Weber, the economist of the Swiss Trade Union Federation, was in favor. In June 1936 the Department of Economic Affairs, headed by Hermann Obrecht, discreetly began to study the measures to be taken to prevent prices from rising in the event of a devaluation. The SNB and the majority of the Federal Council nevertheless remained firmly attached to the gold parity. The opponents of devaluation put forward the argument of "monetary dignity": it was in Switzerland's interest to inspire confidence. They stressed that the raw materials the country had to import would become more expensive, and they pointed to the negative effects on Switzerland's claims abroad, which amounted to 8 billion francs in 1933 and were mostly denominated in francs.

== Decision ==
On 24 September 1936 the French minister of the economy, Charles Spinasse, informed Meyer, then president of the Confederation, that the Blum government had decided to devalue the French franc by about 30%. On 25 and 26 September the Federal Council devoted three meetings to the question. The chairman of the SNB's governing board, Gottlieb Bachmann, urged it not to devalue, given the strength of the franc: the SNB's gold reserves amounted to 1,528 million francs, and the gold cover of the banknotes in circulation was 120%. Obrecht, supported first by Rudolf Minger and then by the majority of the Federal Council, stressed instead the difficulties of the Swiss economy, the need to revive exports and the need to choose the right moment to benefit from the devaluation of the French franc.

The devaluation was decided on Saturday, 26 September, against the opposition of Johannes Baumann, head of the Department of Justice and Police, and of Meyer, who explained the government's decision on the radio the following day. On the same day the Federal Council reduced the gold content of the franc to an amount to be set between 0.190 and 0.215 grams of fine gold, and the SNB set the rate of devaluation at 30%. The speed of the Federal Council's decision and the closure of the stock exchanges until 29 September prevented speculation against the franc.

== Effects ==
The devaluation contributed to the success of the national defense loan launched on 21 September, two-thirds of which was subscribed between 28 September and 15 October. The abundance of available capital allowed the SNB to lower its discount rate in November to 1.5%, a level it had never reached since its founding in 1907. The accompanying measures that the government adopted immediately limited the rise in prices: the cost-of-living index rose by only eight points between September 1936, when it stood at 130, and the eve of the war. The effects on tourism were positive, and exports rose from 882 million francs (525,700 tonnes) in 1936 to 1,286 million francs (706,800 tonnes) in 1937. The average number of unemployed fell from 93,009 in 1936 to 71,130 in 1937 and 65,583 in 1938. The Second World War contributed to the strength of the franc, which became a refuge currency and an international means of payment.

== Bibliography ==
- R. Ruffieux, La Suisse de l'entre-deux-guerres, 1974
- H. Böschenstein, Bundesrat Obrecht, 1882–1940, 1981
- Ph. Müller, La Suisse en crise (1929–1936): les politiques monétaire, financière, économique et sociale de la Confédération helvétique, 2010

=== Sources ===
- Documents diplomatiques suisses, vols. 10–11

=== Archives ===
- Swiss Federal Archives, Bern: records of the Federal Department of Economic Affairs and of the Federal Department of Finance
