= 1936 Swiss defense loan =

Swiss federal armament loan of 1936

The 1936 Swiss defense loan (German: Wehranleihe; French: emprunt de défense nationale; Italian: prestito di difesa nazionale) was a federal loan that the Swiss Federal Council offered for subscription from 21 September to 15 October 1936 to cover an extraordinary armament program approved by the federal parliament in June 1936. It paid 3% interest and raised 335 million francs in total. The devaluation of the franc, which took place during the subscription period, turned it from a mediocre into a good investment.

== Issue ==
In view of the danger of war, the federal parliament approved 235 million francs for an extraordinary armament program in June 1936. To cover it, the Federal Council offered the defense loan for subscription from 21 September to 15 October 1936. At 3%, its interest rate was slightly below that of contemporary government bonds, but it matched the rate paid on savings deposits. The loan also offered various benefits: no stamp duty, registration in the federal debt register (Eidgenössisches Schuldbuch), small denominations and short-term repayment. It was accompanied by an exceptionally elaborate advertising campaign.

== Result ==
In total, 335 million francs were raised. Two-thirds of the loan was subscribed between 28 September and 15 October, and the devaluation of 1936 contributed to its success. After the devaluation, which took place within the subscription period, the defense loan changed from a mediocre investment into a good one. Investing in the security, whose price on the stock exchange was mostly above par, was therefore financially attractive. According to the historian Bernard Degen, the defense loan was thus by no means the "patriotic sacrifice" that propaganda and tradition portrayed it as.

== Bibliography ==
- R. Ruffieux, La Suisse de l'entre-deux-guerres, 1974, 294–297
- B. Degen, "Plebiszit mit dem Portemonnaie oder Plebiszit des Portemonnaies?", in Studien und Quellen, 26, 2000, 123–156
