= Ligue vaudoise =

Political movement in Vaud, Switzerland

- Formation: 1933
- Type: Political movement
- Members: About 1,000 (1940)
- Key people: Marcel Regamey
- Publication: La Nation
- Website: https://www.ligue-vaudoise.ch/
- Formerly called: Ordre et Tradition

The Ligue vaudoise (Vaud League) is a federalist political movement in the canton of Vaud, Switzerland, with a neo-traditionalist political program. It goes back to the 1920s, when it was known as Ordre et Tradition, and was founded as a movement in 1933. Standing outside the parties and gathered around its newspaper La Nation, it has fought against all centralization in the name of an integral federalism.

== History ==
Active from the 1920s, at first under the name Ordre et Tradition, the Ligue vaudoise developed a neo-traditionalist political program based on Thomist and Maurrassian ideas. Its leader, Marcel Regamey, proposed for the canton of Vaud, which he saw as a community formed by history and a nation in its own right, institutions such as a governor and corporative chambers. The movement was founded in 1933 to rally the federalist forces against a tax on domestic wines, and to occupy the political field against the fronts, with which it tried in vain to ally itself.

From then on, in the name of an integral federalism, the Ligue vaudoise fought against all centralization, which it regarded as an attack on the essence of the Pays de Vaud. Standing outside the parties, in 1940 it gathered about a hundred contributors and a thousand members around its newspaper, La Nation. It found sympathy among the middle class and the liberal professions, and at that time it could count on ten members of the Grand Council of Vaud, one member of the Council of State and two National Councillors belonging to the Liberal and Radical parties.

In 1938 the Ligue vaudoise opposed the federal Penal Code, and in 1945 it supported the return to direct democracy. Having shown its preference for authoritarian regimes before and during the Second World War, it turned its activity, in the anticommunist climate of the 1950s, to the defense of traditional values and of Switzerland's independence. Among other things, it opposed accession to the UN (1986 and 2002) and to the EEA (1992).

== Bibliography ==
- R. Butikofer, Le refus de la modernité, 1996
