= Mandatory referendums in Switzerland =

Direct democracy instrument in Switzerland

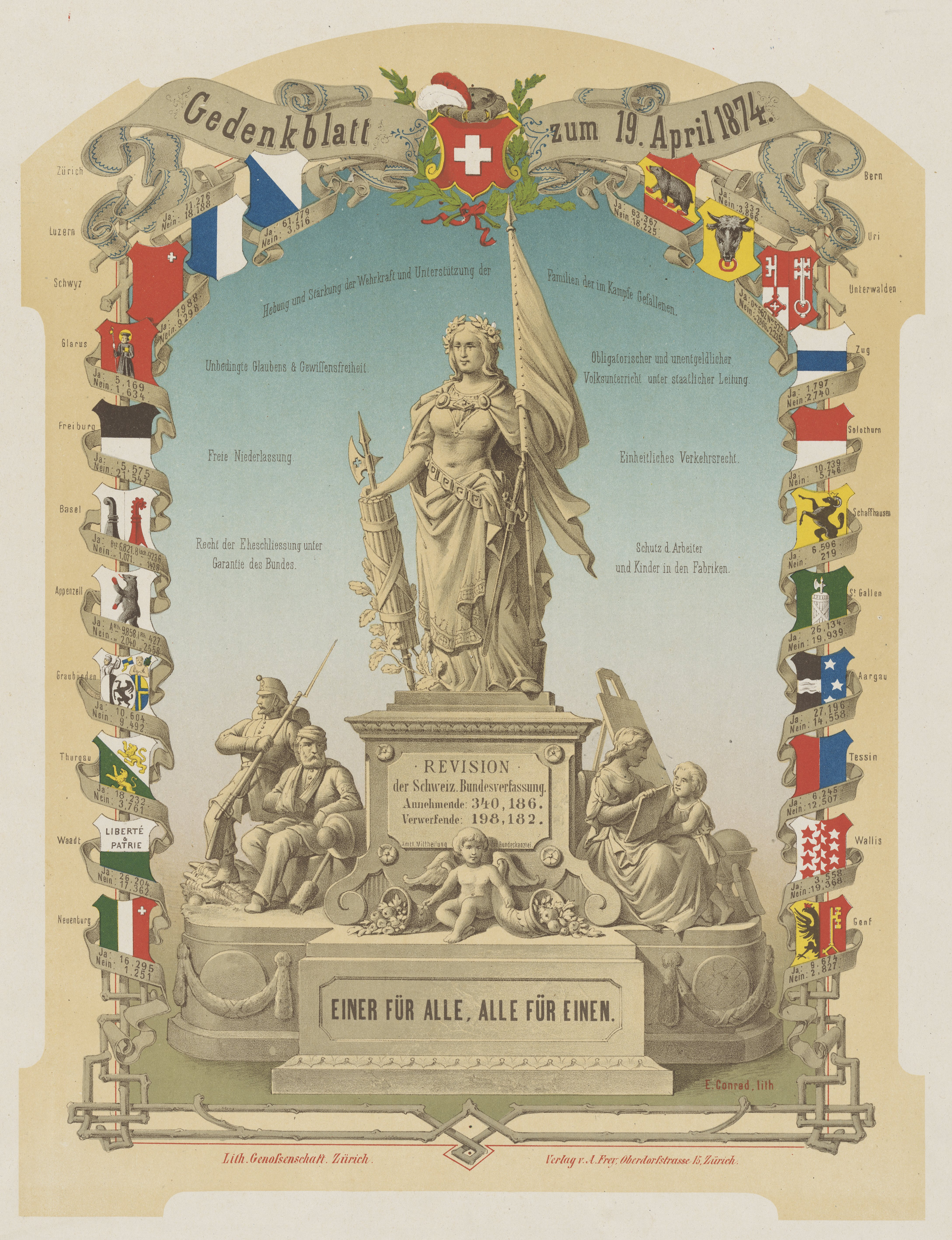
Swiss Federal Constitution, 1874

Switzerland employs mandatory referendums.

This type of referendum is utilized after an item has been passed by parliament and is then put to a vote. In contrast, an optional referendum is only held after a certain number of citizens or cantons request it.

At the federal level, Article 140, paragraph 1 of the Federal Constitution mandates compulsory voting on revisions to the Federal Constitution, the collective security organization membership (e.g., NATO), supranational communities (e.g., the EU), federal laws that lack a constitutional basis and are valid for more than a year (an emergency procedure). Article 140 paragraph 2 of the Federal Constitution mandates that only the people vote on certain matters, primarily as a component of the procedure for the comprehensive revision of the Federal Constitution.

At the cantonal level, each federated state's constitution regulates which matters necessitate a mandatory referendum. Consequently, there exist various scenarios. Nonetheless, all cantons must subject the revision of their constitution to a mandatory referendum (article 51). Some states also subject all state laws to a compulsory referendum, as well as any expense that exceeds a certain amount (referred to as a "financial" referendum).

== Referendum results ==
| Mandatory referendums | 1848-1950 | 1951-1980 | 1981-2020 (mar.) | Total |
|---|---|---|---|---|
| Accepted | 43 | 58 | 73 | 174 |
| Rejected | 20 | 17 | 29 | 66 |
| Total | 63 | 75 | 102 | 240 |

== See also ==
- Double majority
- Optional referendum
- Mandatory referendum
- Voting in Switzerland
