= 1949 Swiss direct democracy popular initiative =

Swiss popular initiative approved in 1949

Return to Direct Democracy
- (Direct democracy initiative)
- Filed on: July 23, 1946
- Filed by: Vaud League
- Counterproposal: no
- Voting: September 11, 1949
- Participation: 45.52%
- Result: accepted
- By people: yes (by 50.7%)
- By cantons: yes (by 11 3/2)

The federal popular initiative "Return to Direct Democracy" was a popular initiative in Switzerland approved by both the people and the cantons on September 11, 1949.

== Proposal ==
The initiative proposed abolishing Article 89, paragraph 3 of the Federal Constitution of Switzerland, which defined an emergency clause, and replacing it with a new Article 89^{bis}. This new article would specify that federal executive orders could, if necessary, enter into force immediately upon approval by a majority of both chambers of Parliament.

However, if such an executive order was challenged by a popular referendum, or if it derogated from the Constitution, its validity would expire after one year and could not be renewed unless it was submitted to a popular vote during that period.

The full text of the initiative is available on the website of the Federal Chancellery.

== Procedure ==
=== Historical background ===
The emergency clause had been included in the Federal Constitution since 1874. It allowed authorities, in cases requiring rapid intervention, to exclude the referendum and bring legislation into immediate force, without waiting for the 100-day referendum period.

Between the 1930s and the 1940s, the Federal Government made frequent use of urgent federal executive orders, often without real necessity, thereby preventing popular recourse to the referendum. (Note: The right of referendum was introduced in Switzerland by the Federal Constitution of 1874. Any federal law or non-urgent federal decree is subject to a popular vote if requested by 30,000 citizens or eight cantons.) These measures were motivated, particularly until 1936, by policies of budgetary balance and austerity

A first initiative, entitled Against the Emergency Clause and for the Protection of Democratic Popular Rights, proposed by the Swiss Communist Party, was rejected in a popular vote on February 20, 1938.

Shortly before that vote, a second initiative on the same subject was submitted by the Guidelines Movement. It was withdrawn in 1939 in favor of a counter-proposal which, although approved, proved ineffective.

Finally, on April 7, 1938, a third initiative entitled Popular Initiative Concerning the Constitutional Regulation of Emergency Powers was submitted by the Alliance of Independents. It was withdrawn two years later after Parliament adopted regulations addressing the issue.

=== Signature collection and submission of the initiative ===
The collection of the required 50,000 signatures by the Ligue vaudoise began on January 1, 1946. On July 23, 1946, the initiative was submitted to the Swiss Federal Chancellery, which declared it valid on September 3, 1946.

=== Discussions and recommendations of the authorities ===
Both the Federal Assembly and the Federal Council recommended rejecting the initiative.

In its official message, the Federal Council stated that it has studied the possibility of proposing, as a counter-proposal, to limit urgent federal executive orders to a maximum duration of three years. However, it abandoned this idea because of the legal difficulties such a status would create.

Regarding the substance of the initiative, the Federal Council argued that the one-year deadline for submitting an executive order to a vote was "too short to allow for a normal constitutional revision".

As an example, the government cited the 1936 financial program, which had been adopted through an urgent federal executive order and would have required revisions to five constitutional articles, 23 federal laws, four federal executive orders, and the statutes of two insurance funds.

=== Vote ===
Submitted to a popular vote in September 1949, the initiative was approved by 11 3/2 cantons and by 50.7% of valid votes cast.

== Effects ==
On July 27, 1946, only four days after the introduction of this initiative, another popular initiative entitled For the Return to Direct Democracy, supported by the same committee and dealing with the same subject, was submitted to the Federal Chancellery.

It sought to regulate, through transitional measures, urgent executive orders adopted before the approval of this initiative. This new proposal was later withdrawn following an indirect counter-proposal by Parliament.

During the 1999 revision of the Federal Constitution, the notion of urgent federal executive orders was replaced by "Emergency Legislation", defined in Article 165 of the Constitution, with essentially identical rules.
