= HSA =

HSA may refer to:

== Finance and medicine ==
- HSA Bank, US
- Health savings account, US
- Healthcare Spending Account, Canada
- Hospital Saving Association, UK, now Simplyhealth
- Sultanah Aminah Hospital, Johor, Malaysia
- Health Sciences Authority, Singapore
- Health and Safety Authority, Ireland
- Heat stable antigen, a protein
- Human serum albumin

== Education ==
- Harvard Student Agencies
- Hmar Students' Association, in Imphal, Manipur, India
- The Harlem School of the Arts

== Transportation ==
- Hellenic Space Agency, Greece
- Hawker Siddeley Aviation
- East African Safari Air, by ICAO code
- Harry Stern Airport, in Richland County, North Dakota, US
- Stennis International Airport, in Bay St. Louis, Mississippi, US, FAA airport code
- High Speed Amphibian, an amphibious vehicle created by Alan Gibbs

== Other uses ==
- Heterogeneous System Architecture, in computing
  - HSA Foundation
- Homeland Security Act, US
- Host State Act (Switzerland)
- Haiku Society of America
- Hayel Saeed Anam Group, a Yemeni conglomerate
- Hunt Saboteurs Association, UK

== See also ==
- HSAS (disambiguation)
