= HWT =

HWT may refer to:

- Harvey World Travel, a former Australian travel agency franchise
- Health and welfare trust, a Canadian healthcare plan
- The Herald and Weekly Times, an Australian newspaper publishing company
- Heritage Walk Trivandrum, an Indian non-profit organisation
- HIStory World Tour, 1996-97 concert tour by Michael Jackson
- Hypersonic wind tunnel
- Herschel Walker trade, the largest player trade in the history of the U.S. National Football League
- Humanoid Walking Tank, a type of robot in the Japanese video game Gunparade March
