= Suze Orman =

American financial advisor (born 1951)

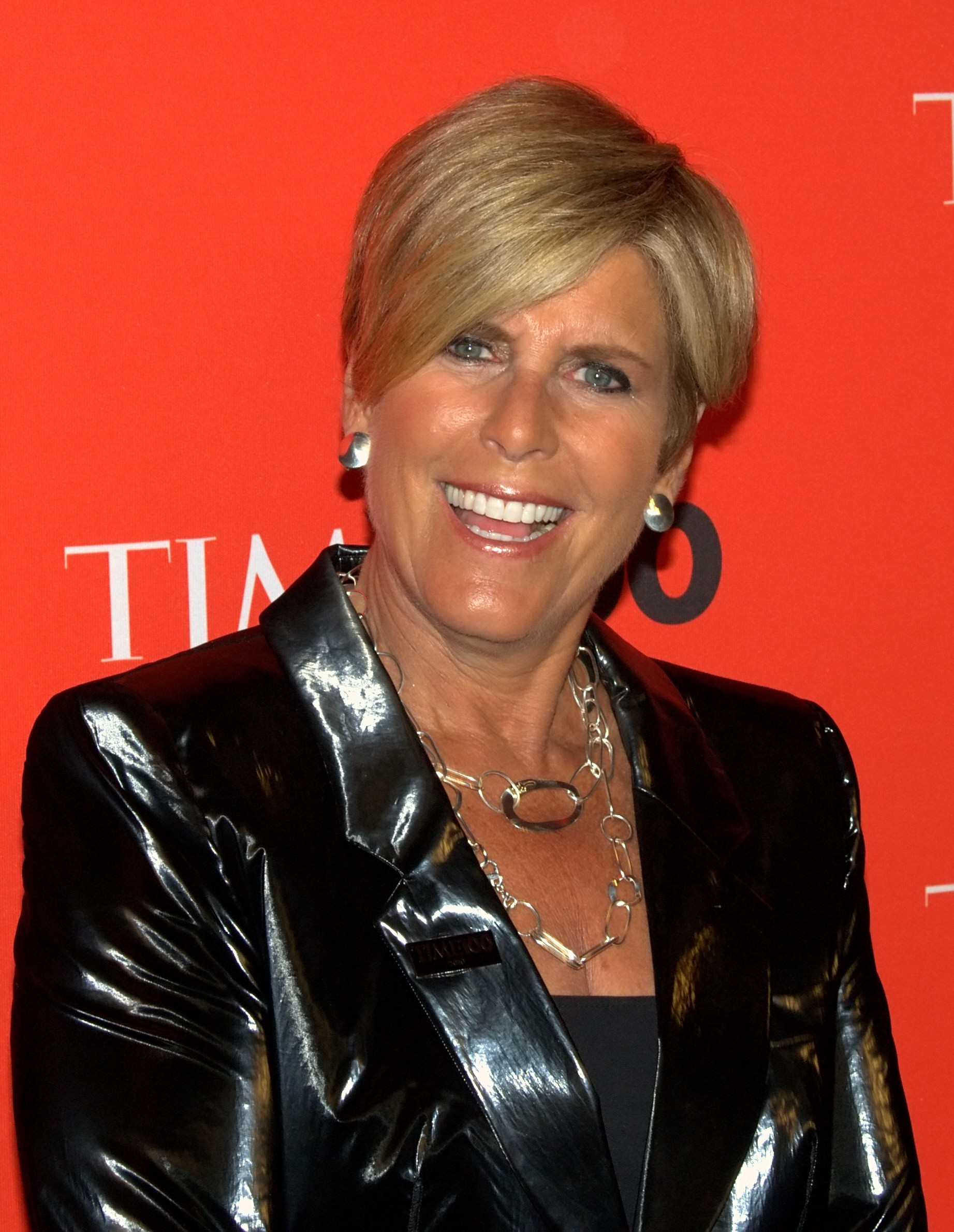
- Orman in 2010
- Born: June 5, 1951 (age 75); Chicago, Illinois, U.S.
- Education: University of Illinois at Urbana–Champaign (BA)
- Occupations: Financial advisor; author; podcaster
- Known for: The Suze Orman Show
- Spouse: Kathy Travis (m. 2010)
- Website: Official website

Susan Lynn "Suze" Orman (/ˈsuːzi/ SOO-zee; born June 5, 1951) is an American financial advisor, author, and podcast host. In 1987, she founded the Suze Orman Financial Group. Her work as a financial advisor gained notability with The Suze Orman Show, which ran on CNBC from 2002 to 2015.

Orman has written ten consecutive New York Times bestsellers about personal finance. She was named twice to the Time 100 list of influential people, has won two Emmy Awards and eight Gracie Awards. Orman has written, co-produced and hosted nine PBS specials, and has appeared on multiple additional television shows. She has been a guest on The Oprah Winfrey Show approximately 29 times and Larry King Live over 30 times. Orman is currently the podcast host of Suze Orman's Women & Money Podcast.

== Early life and education ==
Orman was born on the South Side of Chicago on June 5, 1951, to Jewish parents of Russian and Romanian origin, Ann and Morry Orman. Her mother worked as a secretary for a local rabbi, while her father, an immigrant from Kiev, worked in a chicken factory and managed Morry's Deli in Hyde Park.

She attended the University of Illinois Urbana-Champaign, where she earned a B.A. in social work in 1976. In 2009, Orman received an honorary doctorate of humane letters from the University of Illinois at Urbana–Champaign. The following year, in 2010, she was presented with an honorary doctorate of Commercial Science from Bentley University.

== Career ==
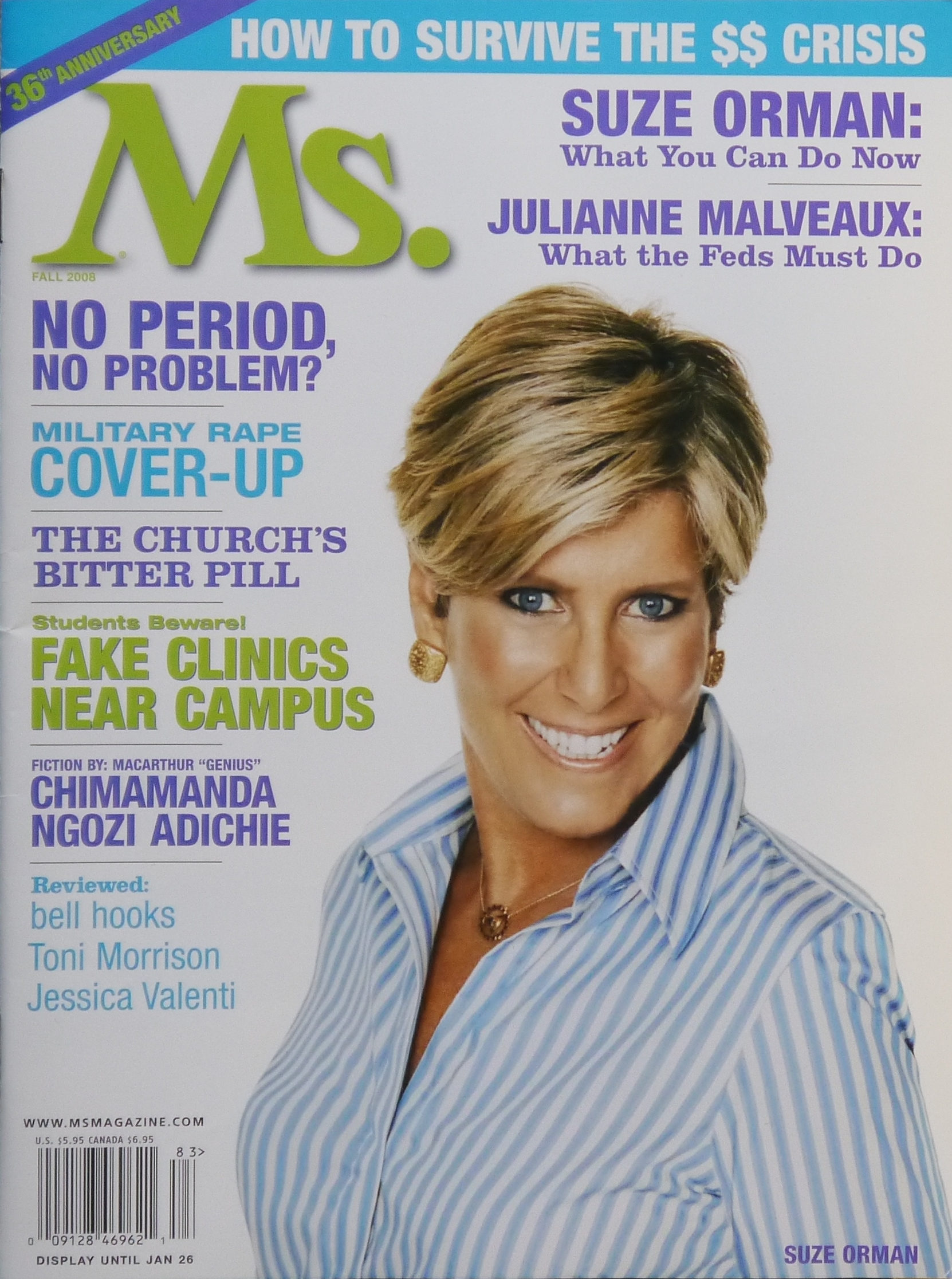
Orman on the cover of Ms. magazine in 2008

After finishing school, Orman moved to Berkeley, California, where she worked as a waitress. In 1980, she borrowed $52,000 from friends to open a restaurant.

According to Orman, as an investment novice, she invested that money through a representative at Merrill Lynch, who promptly lost her entire investment in trading options. Later, Orman trained as an account executive for Merrill Lynch, where she reports that she learned that the type of investment her broker had put her in was not suitable for her needs, as option trading is considered a high-risk but high-reward investment suitable only for high net worth individuals. Orman further asserts that it was explained to her that because her broker was the highest producing representative in the office, his actions went unchecked. After completing her training with Merrill Lynch, she remained at the firm until 1983, when she left to become a vice president of investments at Prudential Bache Securities.

In 1987, Orman resigned from Prudential and founded the Suze Orman Financial Group, in Emeryville, California. While there, she published a booklet, The Facts on Single Premium Whole Life, which compared single-premium whole life, universal life, and single-premium deferred annuities; she distributed copies of the booklet for free to anyone who requested one. She was director of the firm until 1997.

Orman published ten original books between 1995 and 2020: You've Earned It Don't Lose It (1995), The 9 Steps to Financial Freedom (1997), The Courage to be Rich (1999), The Road to Wealth (2001), The Laws of Money, The Lessons of Life (2003), The Money Book for the Young Fabulous and Broke (2005), Women & Money (2007), The 2009 Action Plan (2009), The Money Class (2011) and The Adventures of Billy & Penny (2017, children's book). Orman also published three updated versions of her bestselling books: Suze Orman's Action Plan: New Rules for New Times (March 2010), The Money Class: How to Stand in Your Truth and Create the Future You Deserve (2012), Women & Money: Be Smart Strong and Secure (Sept 2018) and The Ultimate Retirement Guide for 50+ (2020).

The Suze Orman Show began airing on CNBC in 2002. In February 2008, Orman gave away copies of her book Women and Money for free, following an appearance on The Oprah Winfrey Show, generating almost two million downloads. 2008–2010, she was portrayed on Saturday Night Live by Kristen Wiig. Orman has been featured on the Food Network's Paula's Party. In January 2011, Orman appeared on Oprah's Allstars. In January 2012, Orman's six-episode TV series America's Money Class with Suze Orman premiered on OWN: Oprah Winfrey Network. For this show, Orman answered questions about money management. Money Class lasted six episodes.

Orman wrote a financial advice column for O, The Oprah Magazine. She is the former author of Yahoo!'s "Money Matters" and writes for the Costco Connection Magazine. She contributed to The Philadelphia Inquirer, Lowes MoneyWorks and Your Business at Home Magazine.

Orman's final episode of The Suze Orman Show aired on March 28, 2015, reportedly so that Orman could develop a new series, Suze Orman's Money Wars, for Warner Bros. Telepictures Productions. Orman hoped the show would premiere in 2016, but it was not produced.

In 2016, Orman was appointed as a personal finance educator for the United States Army and Army Reserve.

In 2018, Suze began serving as a Special Advocate for the National Domestic Violence Hotline, to help spread awareness regarding financial abuse.

In 2020, Suze Orman became a cofounder of SecureSave, a fintech company spun out of Pioneer Square Labs. SecureSave was acquired in 2025 by HSA Bank, a health savings account administrator owned by Webster Bank.

Suze is currently the podcast host of the twice-weekly Suze Orman's Women & Money Podcast.

== Personal life ==
In February 2007, Orman stated that she is a lesbian. Orman has been married to Kathy Travis (nicknamed KT) since 2010. Travis is also her business partner. According to Orman, "KT's career has been building brands, and I'm a brand."

In 2008, Orman donated money to the Democratic Party. In a 2008 interview with Larry King, she said she favors the policies of the Democratic Party and Barack Obama, especially regarding people in same-sex relationships.

== Controversies ==
In 2012, Orman introduced the Approved prepaid debit card, which was backed by Bancorp Bank. The card generated a great deal of controversy for its hidden fees and false promise of contributing to a FICO score. Cardholders were charged a $3 monthly fee, as well as fees for check writing and customer service calls. The Approved card's features included credit reports and credit scores from TransUnion, as well as credit monitoring and identity theft protection. TransUnion also agreed to "examine data from Approved cards", which was unusual for prepaid debit cards, but did not factor the card's usage into the cardholders' FICO scores. In July 2014, the Approved card was discontinued.

Orman has also received criticism for making misleading statements relating to her credentials and achievements, notably her time teaching at the controversial for-profit University of Phoenix.

== Bibliography ==
=== Books ===
- You've Earned It, Don't Lose It: Mistakes You Can't Afford to Make When You Retire (with Linda Mead) (1995)
- The Nine Steps To Financial Freedom: Practical and Spiritual Steps So You Can Stop Worrying (1997)
- The Courage to Be Rich: Creating a Life of Material and Spiritual Abundance (1999)
- The Road to Wealth: Everything You Need to Know in Good and Bad Times (2001)
- The Laws of Money, the Lessons of Life (2003)
- The Money Book for the Young, Fabulous and Broke (2005)
- Women and Money: Owning the Power to Control Your Destiny (2007)
  - Revised and updated: Women & Money: Be Smart Strong and Secure (Sept 2018)
- Suze Orman's 2009 Action Plan: Keeping Your Money Safe and Sound (2009)
  - Revised and updated: Suze Orman's Action Plan: New Rules for New Times (March 2010)
- The Money Class: Learn to Create Your New American Dream (March 2011)
  - Revised and updated: The Money Class: How to Stand in Your Truth and Create the Future You Deserve (2012)
- The Adventures of Billy & Penny (Jan 2017) (children's book, illustrated by wife KT)
- The Ultimate Retirement Guide for 50+: Winning Strategies to Make your Money Last a Lifetime (Feb 2020)

=== Multimedia ===
Orman is also creator of a number of non-book products, primarily CD-ROM-based services that offer education and various financial services usually in conjunction with her books and writings.

- Suze Ormans FICO Kit – First offered in 2002 in conjunction with Fair Isaac Corporation.
- Suze Orman's Will & Trust Kit – Introduced in 2005 with her personal trust attorney.
- Suze Orman's Insurance Kit – Introduced in 2007.
- Suze Orman's Protection Portfolio – First introduced in 2002, in third version.
- Suze Orman's Identity Theft Kit – First offered in 2008, in conjunction with TrustedID.
- Suze Orman's Save Yourself Retirement Program – Introduced September 2009, in conjunction with TD Ameritrade.
