= Private health services plan =

A Private Health Services Plan in Canada is Health and/or Dental Care, as part of an insured Group Insurance Plan or a self-insured plan, such as a Health Spending Account, Cost-Plus Plan or one of the three options under a Health and Welfare Trust.

== Overview ==
Health and Welfare Trusts are divided into three sections, one of which is a Private Health Services Plan. Private Health Services Plans can be Insured (by an Insurance Company) or Self-insured (through an Insurer or Administrator). Self-insured Private Health Services Plans are often referred to as Health Spending Accounts. The Canada Revenue Agency states that Self-insured Private Health Services Plans (Health Spending Accounts) are NOT AVAILABLE to any self-employed unincorporated employers without arms-length employees. Their only option is an Insured Plan with an Insurer. This can be confirmed by contacting CRA.

In 1986, the Canada Revenue Agency introduced an interpretation bulletin entitled IT-85R2 - Health & Welfare Trusts for Employees. This bulletin provided the basics for what would be known as a Health Spending Account or HSA to most Canadians. The original 1986 bulletin provided a tax-free vehicle for incorporated professionals and companies. Three years later in 1989, after pressure from non-incorporated entities, Canada Revenue Agency released another bulletin, IT-339R2 (Meaning of Private Health Services Plan), providing details on the concept of a Private Health Services Plan or PHSP for non-incorporated businesses in Canada.

The Canada Revenue Agency, in the annual Guides it publishes for those reporting self-employment income from a business or a profession, or from farming, provides instructions for deducting Private Health Services Plan premiums.

== Confusion and controversy ==
There is no confusion or controversy, just a lack of understanding of the CRA IT Bulletins. The funds in a PHSP, as outlined in the guidelines set in interpretation bulletin IT-339R2, CANNOT revert to the employer. Canada Revenue Agency released another bulletin in 1998 indicating that the funds could revert to the employer but ONLY in the case of a notional credit program tied to a flex benefits or cafeteria style plan. The "notional credit" model, outlined in the Canada Revenue Agency IT-bulletin entitled IT-529 was designed to allow companies to add an HSA to a Flex Benefits Plan as an additional benefit for items not covered under the traditional group benefits plan. The bulletin provided the accounting rules for flex benefit programs and using notional credits for the employer.

Today, the major insurers offer Health Spending Accounts with a core group health insurance program. Several HSA Providers also offer Health Spending Accounts as stand-alone benefit solutions with carry-forward of deposited funds or incurred expenses - but not both - for a period of 12 months.

== Funding ==
The employer can make contributions to an insured PHSP (like group insurance) with monthly premiums, or to a self-insured PHSP (like a Health Spending Account) on a periodic basis, or set a calendar year maximum for a plan with no prior contributions.

=== Self-employed individuals with no employees other than family members ===
Note: This is for an Insured Plan with an Insurer, and NOT for a Self-insured PHSP (a Health Spending Account)

- Business owner: $1,500/year
- Spouse: $1,500/year
- Dependent over 18 years or older: $1,500/year
- Dependent under 18 years old: $750/year

Example: A household with 1 sole-proprietor, a spouse, and one child under 18 years old would be eligible for 2 X $1,500 PLUS $750, for a total of $3,750.

=== Self-employed individuals with arms length employees ===
The business owner may have the same spending limit assigned to full-time staff.

=== Corporations (incorporated businesses) ===
- Maximums for Employee/Shareholders must be "reasonable" (usually 10% of T4 income)
- Different maximums and benefits can apply to different Classes of Employees. All Employees in the Class must be included.

 Example: Executives $10,000/year, Managers $5,000/year, Employees $2,500/year

Forfeiture of Funds - Any funds must be used within 12 months from the date of deposit, with a 12-month carry-forward available as an optional selection. Deposit are NEVER forfeited to the administrator, as this would be theft of the Employer's funds.

== Participation Rules ==
A sole-proprietor can establish a PHSP with an Insurer only. If the sole-proprietor has arms-length employees, they can provide a Health Spending Account for Employees and the same benefits for themselves.

== Eligible Expenses ==
The most common definition of a medical expense is a payment made to a licensed medical practitioner qualified to practice under the provincial laws of the place where the expenses were incurred. Medical expenses eligible to be paid out of the PHSP are expenses which would otherwise qualify as medical expenses within section 118.2(2) of the Income Tax Act. Some of the basic healthcare expenditures covered by an HSA include...

=== Prescription medicines, drugs, and vitamins ===
Drugs prescribed by a Licensed Practitioner and dispensed by a Registered Pharmacist are eligible. Vitamins and supplements (even if prescribed by a Licensed Medical Practitioner) are not an eligible medical expense.

=== Vision ===
Eyeglasses, if prescribed, are eligible medical expenses.

=== Dental ===
An amount paid to a dentist, dental hygienist, dental surgeon or dental mechanic for dental services provided to the patient (to the extent that the fees are for diagnostic, therapeutic or rehabilitative services) are eligible medical expenses.

=== Professional services ===
An amount paid to a licensed medical practitioner is an eligible medical expense. They can include depending on the provincial jurisdiction:

• Chiropractor • Audiologist • Chiropodist • Christian Science Practitioner • Dentist • Dental Hygienist • Dental Technician • Denturist • Dietician • Osteopath • Physiotherapist • Podiatrist • Psychiatrist • Psychoanalyst • Physician and Surgeon • Psychologist • Radiologist • Massage Therapist • Midwife • Neurologist • Occupational Therapist • Optician • Speech Therapist • Registered Nurse • Respiratory Therapist • Naturopath

All medical doctors, medical practitioners, dentists, pharmacists, nurses or optometrists must be authorized to practice under the laws of the provincial jurisdiction where the service is rendered, in order for the medical expenses to be eligible.

=== Cosmetic surgery ===
It has generally been accepted that an amount paid to a medical practitioner for surgery of any kind, whether cosmetic or elective generally qualifies as a medical expense. It is presumed that such surgery is carried out for a valid medical reason.

CRA has however qualified that expenses for purely cosmetic procedures, including any related services and other expenses such as travel, incurred after March 4, 2010, are no longer an eligible expense. Both surgical and non-surgical procedures purely aimed at enhancing one's appearance are a non-eligible expense.

Examples of expenses that are non-eligible include the following: • liposuction; • hair replacement procedures; • botulinum injections; and • teeth whitening.

An expense, including those identified above, will continue to qualify if it is necessary for medical or reconstructive purposes, such as surgery to address a deformity related to a congenital abnormality, a personal injury resulting from an accident or trauma, or a disfiguring disease.

=== Transportation costs ===
In addition to ambulance charges to and from hospitals, eligible medical expenses include any commercial transport service transporting a patient and an attendant (if medically necessary to accompany the patient) to a clinic/hospital/doctor's office. The distance traveled must be in excess of 40 km to obtain such equivalent service not readily available closer to home. If the distance traveled is in excess of 80 km, the eligible costs would include meals and accommodation, in addition to transportation expenses.

=== Insurance Premiums ===
Premiums paid to a non-government medical or hospital care group plan are eligible medical expenses.

== Dependants ==
The employee can submit medical claims for him/herself and any of his/her dependents that are defined as:

- Any dependent child or grandchild of the employee or their spouse
- Any Canadian resident (at any time in the year) parent, grandparent, brother, sister, uncle, aunt, niece or nephew of the employee or their spouse who was dependent on them at any time during the year.

== Popularity and Growth ==
For years, PHSPs have been a part of Canadian group health and dental plans. The PHSP can be set up as the primary health and dental plan by using a Health Spending Account, as a cost-effective alternative to a traditional insured benefits plan.

== Providers of HWTs and PHSPs ==
There are numerous specialized providers of Health Spending Accounts (Self-insured PHSPs) in the form of pre-paid or notional credit programs. Major insurers offer Health Spending Accounts supplementary to group insurance (insured employee benefit plans) only.

Note: Self-insured PHSP (Employer provided for Employees) are Health Spending Accounts.

Note: HSAs for unincorporated owners without arms-length employees, are not acceptable to CRA.
