= Steen Rasmussen =

Steen Rasmussen is the name of:

- Steen Rasmussen (athlete) (1888–?), Danish long-distance runner
- Steen Rasmussen (physicist) (born 1955), Danish physicist and artificial life researcher
- Steen Eiler Rasmussen (1898–1990), Danish architect and urban planner
