= HCSA =

HCSA may refer to:

- Hate Crime Statistics Act, A United States congress Act to provide for the acquisition and publication of data about crimes that manifest prejudice based on certain group characteristics
- HC Sierre-Anniviers, a Swiss ice hockey team
- Health Care Spending Account, a Canadian employee health benefit plan
- Hospital Consultants and Specialists Association, A professional body in the UK specifically designed for senior hospital doctors
