= Heritage Walk Trivandrum =

- Formation: 2013
- Founder: Bina Tharakan
- Founded at: Thiruvananthapuram, Kerala
- Type: Voluntary Non-Profit

Heritage Walk Trivandrum (HWT) is a voluntary, non-profit initiative in Thiruvananthapuram, Kerala, India to educate people on the history and heritage of Thiruvananthapuram city and district.

== History ==
Heritage Walk Trivandrum (HWT) was conceived and founded in October 2013 by Bina Thomas Tharakan, with assistance from archaeologists, conservation architects, historians, and resource persons from various fields. HWT focuses primarily on history as people's history, and heritage as the common treasured past, both tangible and intangible, existing in every by-lane of the city and not necessarily in the majestic or grand only.

In October 2017, Tharakan gave a TEDx Talk on HWT in Thiruvananthapuram.

== Founder and prominent members ==
Bina Thomas Tharakan (aka Elizabeth Thomas Tharakan), archaeologist, children's author, is the founder member and coordinator of HWT. At the time of HWT's launch, Bina was a Special Officer with the Ministry of Culture and in-charge of coordinating activities for nominating two monuments of Kerala into UNESCO's World Heritage List, a project that ended in 2017. Since 2013, Bina has been organising the heritage walks to discover and showcase interesting facts, location, and monuments that have previously not been documented.

Prominent members of HWT include Professor Achuthsankar S. Nair (Bioinformatics), MG Radhakrishnan (Asianet News), Gouridasan Nair (The Hindu, now retired), and Malayinkil Gopalakrishnan (Mathrubhumi). The pool of subject experts include Sharat Sundar Rajeev (Conservation Architect), Dr Hemachandran Pillai (Archaeologist), and others who support, contribute time, and share their knowledge.

== Programme ==
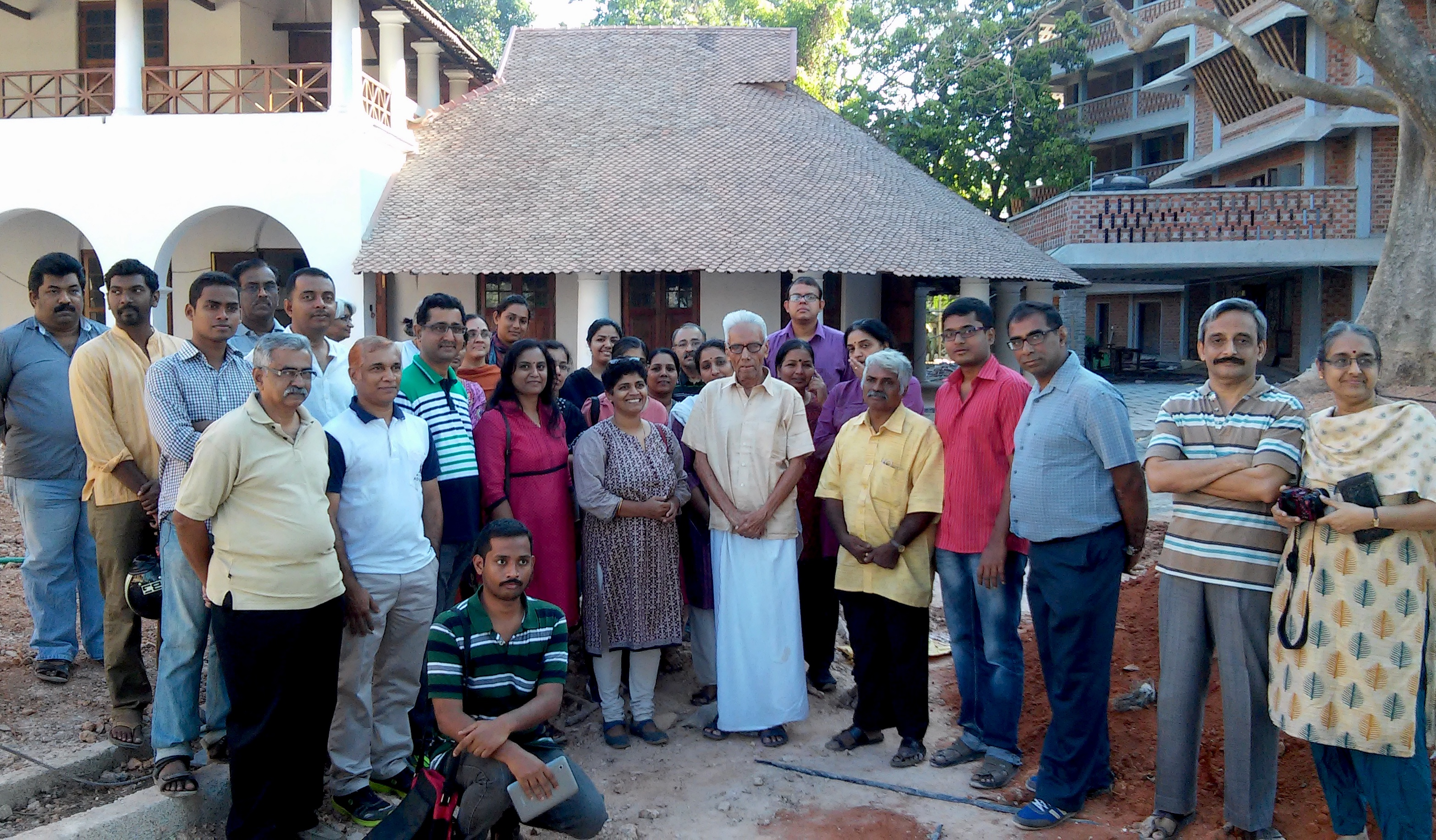
HWT at Barton Hill, Thiruvananthapuram

HWT conducts its events on last Sunday of every month. HWT events are free for all and are open to all interested to see, hear, and learn from scholars and researchers on Thiruvananthapuram's history and heritage. HWT has consistently conducted walks, excursions, and discussions on different aspects and phases of the Thiruvananthapuram city's establishment, growth, and its progress from ancient times to the recent past.

The heritage walks try to discover the historical significance that are concealed or forgotten in its bylanes, crowded bazaars, places of worship, and public infrastructural development including schools, hospitals, institutes and offices. Each walk has yielded a wealth of information and has revealed many insights that have not been documented until now. HWT also conducts heritage home visits, keeping in mind the changing cityscapes and demolition of old private home structures.

Many local residents share the oral heritage with the diverse group consisting of students, scientists, medical practitioners, engineers, teachers, writers, media persons, homemakers etc. It is a multi-disciplinary approach wherein interest is generated with anecdotes from locals, along with historical facts and figures from subject experts.

== Media ==
In an article in The Hindu celebrating the 1st Anniversary of HWT, Saraswathy Nagarajan writes: "Thanks to Trivandrum Heritage Walk and its indefatigable group of enthusiasts, the city is revealing its secrets that are concealed in its tiny bylanes, crowded bazaars, places of worship and heritage buildings."

In The New Indian Express on the 2nd Anniversary of HWT, Aswathy Karnaver writes: "...the interactive walking tour has evolved into the proportions of a movement that seeks to understand, preserve and disseminate the parallel history of Thiruvananthapuram."

== Growth and future ==
On 28 July 2019, HWT accomplished its 60th event focused on iconic structures in Kowdiar. In order to spread similar Heritage Walk initiatives across all the districts of Kerala, by identifying and encouraging local experts and resource persons, HWT visited Kollam town, and Muziris Project area near Aluva.
