= HAWT =

HAWT may refer to:

- Health and welfare trust
- Horizontal-axis wind turbine
- Slang for physical attractiveness or sexual arousal (because it sounds like the English word hot)
- The Hawt House, a fictional location in the video game WarioWare: Touched!
