= HSAS =

HSAS may refer to:

- Hagar Schon Aaronson Shrieve, a rock supergroup from California
- Homeland Security Advisory System, an American color-coded terrorism threat advisory scale
- Hydrocephalus, a congenital disorder colloquially known as 'water on the brain'
- High School of American Studies, a specialized public high school in Bronx, New York

== See also ==
- HSA (disambiguation)
