= Webster Bank =

American regional bank

Webster Financial Corporation

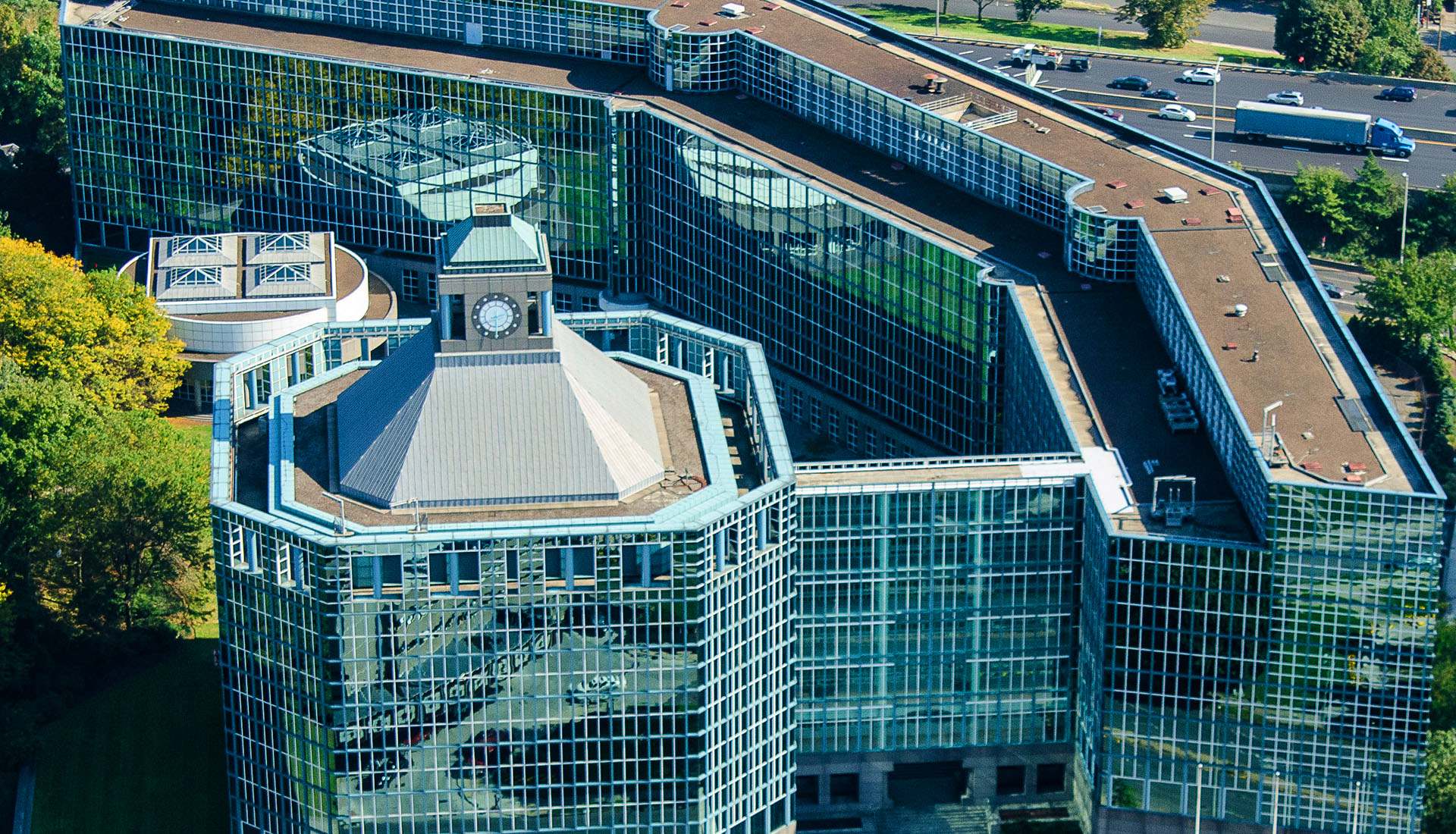
- Headquarters in Stamford, Connecticut
- Industry: Finance
- Founded: 1935; 91 years ago in Waterbury, Connecticut
- Headquarters: Stamford, Connecticut, U.S.
- Key people: John R. Ciulla, President and CEO James C. Smith, Chairman
- Products: Banking
- Revenue: ▲US$4.423 billion (2025)
- Net income: ▲US$1 billion (2025)
- AUM: ▲US$2.813 billion (2025)
- Total assets: ▲US$84 billion (2025)
- Total equity: ▲US$9.492 billion (2025)
- Number of employees: 4,297
- Parent: Santander Bank, N. A.
- Website: websterbank.com

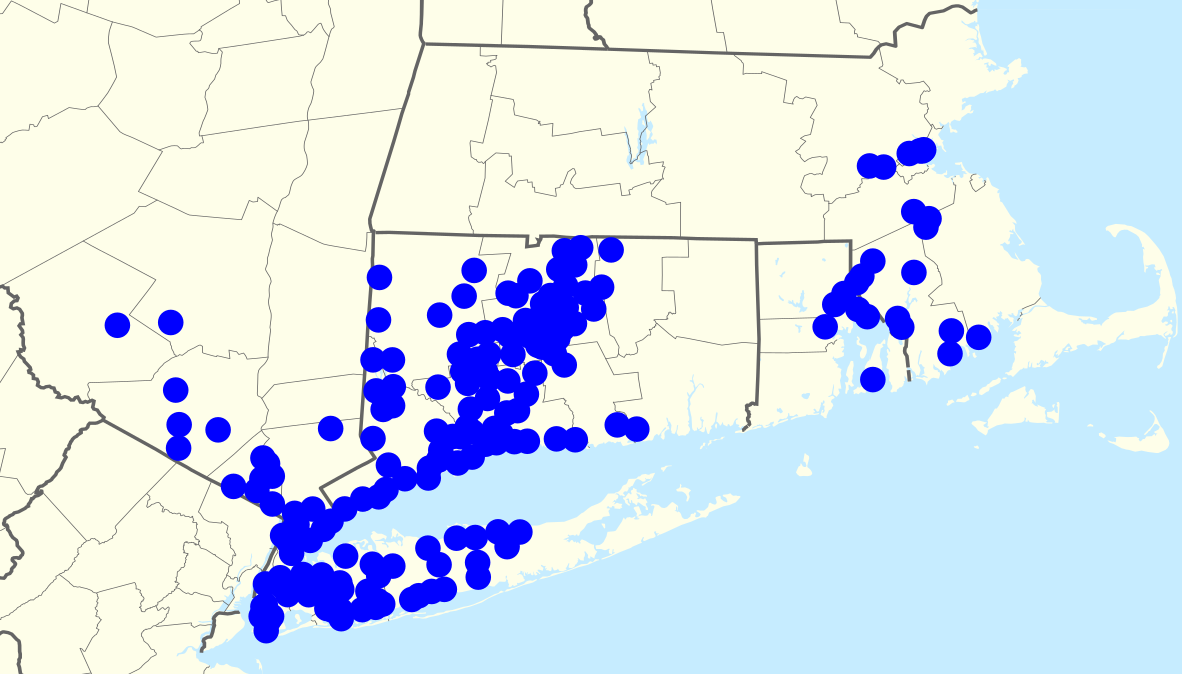
Webster Bank footprint (as of 2026)

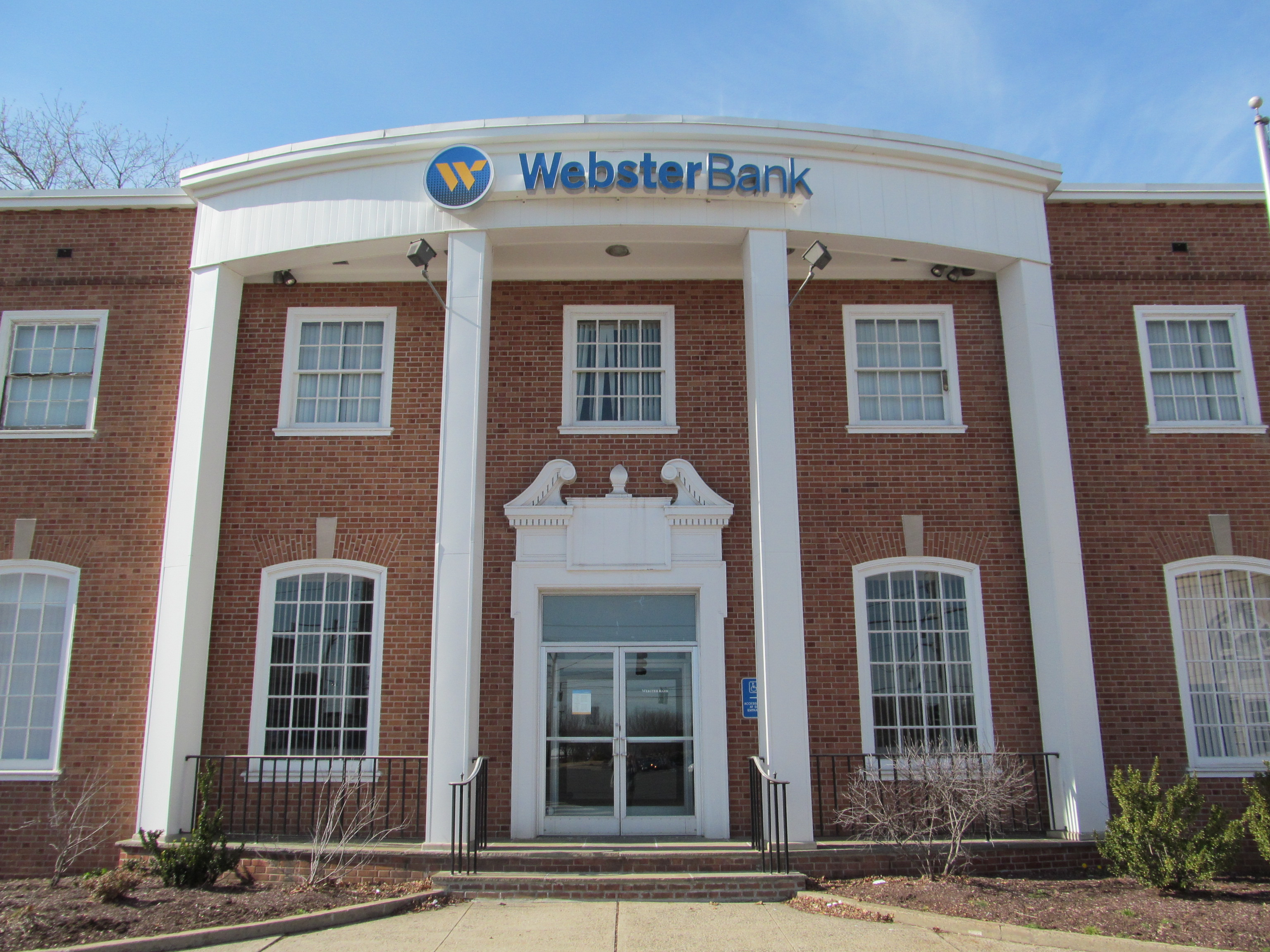
Webster Bank in Hamden, Connecticut

Webster Bank is an American commercial bank based in Stamford, Connecticut. A wholly owned subsidiary of Santander Bank, N. A. since August 20 2026. It has 177 branches and 316 ATMs located in Connecticut; Massachusetts; Rhode Island; New Jersey; Westchester, Orange, Ulster, and Rockland counties in New York as well as New York City.

== History ==
Webster was founded in 1935 by Harold Webster Smith as the First Federal Savings of Waterbury in Connecticut. While Smith initially borrowed from family and friends to open the bank, by 1938 its assets had grown to over $1 million.

In 1986, First Federal converted to stock ownership and formed a holding company. Smith served as CEO until 1987, when he was succeeded by his son, James C. Smith. Smith Sr. continued as chairman.

First Federal was renamed to Webster Bank in 1995. The same year, Harold Smith retired and was succeeded by his son.

In 1997, Webster Trust Company, N.A. and Investment Services were added to the bank's offerings. Webster acquired Eagle Bank of Bristol and became the first bank in Connecticut to purchase an insurance agency the following year.

In 2002, Webster became listed on the New York Stock Exchange under the ticker symbol “WBS”.

IWebster announced a definitive agreement in 2003 to acquire Firstfed America Bancorp, INC., the holding company for First Federal Savings Bank of America. The deal, which closed in May 2004, marked Webster's first retail expansion beyond Connecticut's borders and into the southeastern Massachusetts and Rhode Island markets. It was also announced in 2004 that the Office of the Comptroller of the Currency (OCC) had accepted the company's application to be a chartered commercial bank.

In 2005, it acquired HSA Bank and became the leading bank administrator and trustee of health savings accounts in the United States. Webster acquired NewMil Bank in 2006.

Webster acquired 17 Citibank branches in the Boston area in 2016 and added additional ATMs to support the network.

In 2022, Webster acquired Sterling National Bank and moved its headquarters from Waterbury to Stamford. The Sterling acquisition was valued at $10 billion. In June 2022, Webster had approximately $25.9 billion in deposits in Connecticut.

Webster acquired Ametros Financial, a medical insurance settlement fund manager, for $350 million in 2023.

On February 3, 2026, Banco Santander announced that it will acquire Webster Financial Corporation in a cash and stock deal valued at $12.2 billion. Under the agreement, Webster would operate as a wholly-owned subsidiary of Banco Santander. The acquisition would position Santander as one of the top ten banks in the U.S., with approximately $327 billion in combined assets. Webster shareholders earned $75 per share, consisting of $48.75 in cash and $26.25 in Santander stock. The transaction closed on August 20 2026. The Webster brand is expected to remain in use until 2027, when the bank is expected to fully consolidate under the Santander name.

== Operations ==
Webster Financial Corporation is the holding company for Webster Bank, N.A. and Webster Insurance. Webster Bank owns the asset-based lending firm Webster Business Credit Corporation, the insurance premium finance company Budget Installment Corporation, Webster Capital Finance, and provides health savings account trustee and administrative services through HSA Bank of Sheboygan, Wisconsin, a division of Webster Bank.

In 2015, Webster Bank had over $24 billion in assets and a market capitalization of over $3 billion. Its network included over 177 branches and 316 ATMs located in Connecticut; Massachusetts; Rhode Island; and Westchester County, New York.

After the $5 billion USD 2022 merger with Sterling, assets rose to $65 billion, with 202 branches, 380 ATMs, and a larger presence throughout the metropolitan New York city area, including New Jersey. In 2024, it was the largest bank headquartered in Connecticut based on deposits, which in-state totaled $33 billion. John Ciulla was chairman and CEO.

== See also ==
- List of largest banks in the United States
