= Initiative for Science, Society and Policy =

Danish research center

The Initiative for Science, Society and Policy (ISSP) is a research center sponsored by the University of Southern Denmark and Roskilde University, Denmark.

ISSP aims to help make science and technology integral components of societal planning and public discourse and to be a leading platform for highlighting, expanding and rethinking the meaning of scientific social responsibility in universities across Denmark and abroad.

The vision for ISSP is to enable society to benefit more fully from the scientific expertise at its universities while ISSP supports researchers to reflect more on their scientific responsibilities and participate in civic processes.

== History ==
The center was founded by Steen Rasmussen in 2009 at the University of Southern Denmark. In 2013 it became a cross-university center when Roskilde University joined the ISSP.

== Research groups ==
ISSP research groups serve as open and independent platforms for addressing critical contemporary issues that require productive interactions among science, society and policy. The center currently (2016) has four specific research areas and therefore four research groups: Behavioral Science and Public Policy (BSPP), Living and Intelligent Technology (LIT), Social Software (SoS) and Social Aspects in New Technologies (SAiNT).

=== Behavioural Science and Public Policy (BSPP) ===
The Behavioural Science and Public Policy group is led by Pelle Guldborg Hansen, Behavioural Scientist from Roskilde University, Denmark, who is also the Director of ISSP. The group focuses its attention on applied behavioural science and the responsible use of behavioral science in the making of public policies, with emphasis on securing scientific- and evidence-based policies.

Among many achievements from BSPP the Danish Nudging Network and The European Nudging Network are some of the most prominent.

=== Living and Intelligent Technology (LIT) ===
The Living and Intelligent Technology (LIT) group is led by Steen Rasmussen, professor of physics at the University of Southern Denmark, who is also the founder of ISSP. The group aims to take stock of the state of the art in living and intelligent technology and recommend priorities for the socially responsible scientific pursuit of living and intelligent technology.

LIT is the main creator and enforcer of the BINC mission.

=== Social Software (SoS) ===
The Social Software group is led by Vincent F. Hendricks, professor of formal philosophy at the University of Copenhagen. The aim of the group is to give input to the broader public and decision makers about how the informational society and the technologies that it celebrates are prone to irrational information-phenomena (Infostorms) that may systematically bias and misdirect democratic information and decision processes, and how these problems may be avoided.

ISSPs Social Software group is intertwined with/cooperating with the Center for Information and Bubble Studies (CIBS) at the University of Copenhagen, and the Humanomics Research Center at Aalborg University.

== Missions ==
=== BINC (Bio-, Info,- Nano- & Cognitive Technology) ===
The discussion of a Fourth Industrial Revolution is becoming increasingly more prominent in the public discourse. ISSP argues that the vast technological development of the ecology of the so-called BINC technologies (bio-, info-, nano-, and cognitive technologies) push us towards a global gear-change. ISSP has four theses of what this gear-change means, that has been published in the Danish book “Hvad burde politik handle om?” in 2015, and published separately on the Danish, online news media Videnskab.dk – one of ISSPs partners. The four theses are:

1. The digital economy is fundamentally different from the industrial
2. The middle class and the democracy is under pressure
3. No national state can take care of its citizens by itself
4. A technological gear-change demands new, global narratives

The BINC mission evolves around the sharing and spreading of knowledge and understanding of BINC technologies, the BINC human, the BINC economy, the BINC society and BINC narratives. The BINC mission aims to progress through the establishment of networks and research consortia.

ISSP has a thorough Manifesto that explains the BINC mission – known as the BINC Manifesto.

=== STEM (Science, Technology, Engineering & Math) ===
The STEM missions aims to increase student enrollment in natural science and technology programs in Danish higher education. The initiative was established in response to projected shortages of natural science graduates and engineers in Denmark, including a forecast by the Danish Society of Engineers (IDA) predicting a deficit of over 13,500 master's degree graduates by 2025. The project analyzes student decision-making from early education through university entry to identify key points for targeted intervention using behavioral and psychological models.

=== TEN (The European Nudging Network) ===
The aim of the TEN mission (The European Nudging Network) is to gather the most essential stakeholders in Europe to establish an open-access database of nudges in the world. TEN is going to secure the outreach of the scientific knowledge about nudging, and give policymakers and other stakeholders good grounds to be able to use nudging successfully in their work.
