= Host State Act (Switzerland) =

Swiss federal law

Host State Act (HSA)

Federal Assembly of Switzerland
- Long title: Federal Act on the Privileges, Immunities and Facilities and the Financial Subsidies granted by Switzerland as a Host State (SR 192.12)
- Territorial extent: Switzerland
- Enacted by: Federal Assembly of Switzerland
- Enacted: 22 June 2007
- Commenced: 1 January 2008

Repeals
- Federal decree concerning the conclusion or modification of agreements with international organizations in order to determine their legal status in Switzerland (1955)
- Status: Current legislation

The Host State Act (HSA) (Note: German: Gaststaatgesetz, GSG; French: Loi sur l’État hôte, LEH; Italian: Legge sullo Stato ospite, LSO) is a Swiss federal law that governs the granting of privileges, immunities and financial support to foreign representations, as well as to international organizations and conferences it hosts on its territory.

It was adopted on 22 June 2007 by the Federal Assembly and came into force on 1 January 2008.

== Scope ==
The HSA allows the confederation to grant a wide range of privileges, immunities, and facilities to eligible institutions. These include (art. 3):

- immunity from legal proceedings and the enforcement of judgments;
- exemption from taxation (direct, indirect, custom duties) and from the Swiss social security system;
- exemption from Swiss entry and residence requirements;
- exemption from all personal services, from all public service and from all military duties or obligations of any kind;
- freedom of communication, movement and travel;
- freedom to acquire, receive, hold, transfer and convert funds, currencies, cash and other movable property;
- acquisition of land and building for its own purpose (art. 16).

Not all organizations receive the same type of privileges, which are negotiated on a case-by-case basis. Institutions benefiting from these privileges include the United Nations, the WEF, GAVI, Interpeace, and the Centre for Humanitarian Dialogue.

== Previous laws ==
The law replaced a number of previous laws and ordinances that dealt with host state policy, most importantly the "Federal decree concerning the conclusion or modification of agreements with international organizations in order to determine their legal status in Switzerland" (Note: German: Bundesgesetz über die Rückerstattung unrechtmässig erworbener Vermögenswerte politisch exponierter Personen, RuVG; French: Loi sur la restitution des avoirs illicites, LRAI; Italian: Legge sulla restituzione degli averi di provenienza illecita, LRAI) from 1955.
