= Hmar Students' Association =

Student association of Hmar tribe

The Hmar Students Association (HSA), established in Imphal, Manipur, India, is a large student organisation among the indigenous Hmar people.

It was established on the 3rd of October 1939 which is celebrated as 'HSA Day'.

== Background ==
The organisation was outraged at the mass sexual assault of Hmar women in 2006, along with other groups, to facilitate justice. The organisation has also assisted relocating internally displaced people, and opposed a dam project.

== Motto ==
The H.S.A. motto is ‘Sinin, Hrilin, Sanin, Thuoiin, Serve the Nation,’ meaning ‘Work, Share, Assist, Lead and Serve the Nation’.

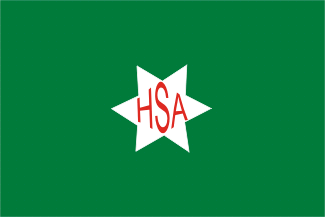
Hmar Students Association flag

== Flag ==
The flag is green in colour with a white star in the middle within which H.S.A. is inscribed. The green colour signifies that the H.S.A. stands for truth. The star is the Pole Star signifying H.S.A as a guide for the nation. Its white colour signifies purity and truth to stand for.H.S.A, inscribed in red {in the middle} shows its dedication and sacrifice for the nation.

== Governing Bodies ==
The Hmar students are governed by three supreme bodies, namely General Assembly, Executive Council and General Headquarters.

General Assembly:

The General Assembly is the apex body and holds the Sovereign power to amend the Constitution. The General President summons and presides its meeting held once every year.

Executive Council:

The Executive Council stands or functions on behalf of the General Assembly. Therefore it has the right to amend the Constitution. In case of an emergency, the General President may summon a meeting of the General Assembly with the approval of the Executive Council.

General Headquarters:

The President and Secretary of General Headquarters are called as President and General Secretary respectively. The General Assembly elects the office bearers of the General Headquarters. Its committee is called the Executive Committee

== Joint Headquarters ==
The Hmar Students’ Association currently have its Joint Headquarters in Shillong, Imphal, Delhi, Aizawl, Kolasib, Sinlung Hills, Hmarram, Vangai, Jiribam, Barak Valley, Churachandpur, Guwahati, Assam Hills.

== Branches ==
HSA has its Branch offices in Silchar in Assam, Ahmednagar, Bangalore, Chennai, Chandigarh and Pune.

== See also ==
- List of Indian student organizations
