= HSA Bank =

US health savings account administrator

- Industry: Consumer-directed healthcare; Financial services
- Founded: 1913; 113 years ago as State Bank of Howards Grove
- Headquarters: Sheboygan, Wisconsin, U.S.
- Key people: Chad Wilkins (president); Tim Patneaude (COO); Greg Madar (CFO); Kevin Robertson (CRO)
- Products: HSA; FSA; HRA; Commuter benefits
- Owner: Webster Bank
- Number of employees: 30,000+ (2022)
- Website: hsabank.com

HSA Bank is a health savings account (HSA) administrator in the United States. Based in Milwaukee and Sheboygan, Wisconsin, the company focuses on the administration, service, and support of health accounts including Health Savings Accounts, Flexible Spending Accounts, and Health Reimbursement Arrangements. It serves more than 2 million members with over 5 billion dollars in total assets.

In 1997, HSA Bank entered the consumer-directed healthcare market by providing medical savings accounts (MSA) to small employers and the self-employed. Since the passage of the Medicare Prescription Drug, Improvement and Modernization Act in 2003 and the creation of health savings accounts in 2004, HSA Bank has serviced and administered health savings accounts to companies of all sizes as well as individuals.

HSA Bank is a division of Santander Bank, N.A., Member FDIC, a wholly owned subsidiary of Santander Group.

== History ==
=== Origin of HSA Bank ===
HSA Bank began as the State Bank of Howards Grove, which opened in January 1913 in northern Sheboygan County. This rural, community bank would become HSA Bank decades later.

In 1997, State Bank of Howards Grove entered the consumer-driven healthcare market by providing MSAs.

In May 2002, the bank acquired approximately 7,000 accounts and $20 million in balances from Citizens Bank, which was in the process of merging Mellon Bank’s retail business.

State Bank of Howards Grove also began using the trade name MSA Bank in 2002.

After the advent of health savings accounts in 2004, MSA Bank redirected its energy and resources on HSAs and changed its name to HSA Bank.

=== Growth of HSA Bank ===
In March 2005, HSA Bank officially became a division of Webster Bank, N.A., Member FDIC, a subsidiary of Webster Financial Corporation.

Since the creation of health savings accounts, HSA Bank has continued to expand its HSA offering. The company currently provides its customers with multiple enrollment options, including customized online enrollment sites, and utilizes real-time Web services, Internet Banking Single Sign On (SSO) and debit cards, among other features.

In 2006, Kiplinger's Personal Finance named HSA Bank "the best place to go" for an HSA, citing the company's "low fees, a knowledgeable call center and plenty of investment choices.”

In 2008, HSA Bank became the first HSA administrator to surpass $500 million in HSA deposits.

In 2013, HSA Bank was listed in Kiplinger's "Best of Everything".

In 2014, HSA Bank announced a partnership with Evolution1 to expand their offerings from only HSAs to other "Consumer Driven Healthcare Solutions".

In 2025, HSA Bank acquired SecureSave, a provider of employer-sponsored emergency savings accounts (ESAs) founded in part by Suze Orman.

In 2026, Santander Bank acquired Webster Bank, making HSA Bank a division of Santander. Santander Bank is a subsidiary of Santander Group.
