= Steen Rasmussen (physicist) =

Danish physicist

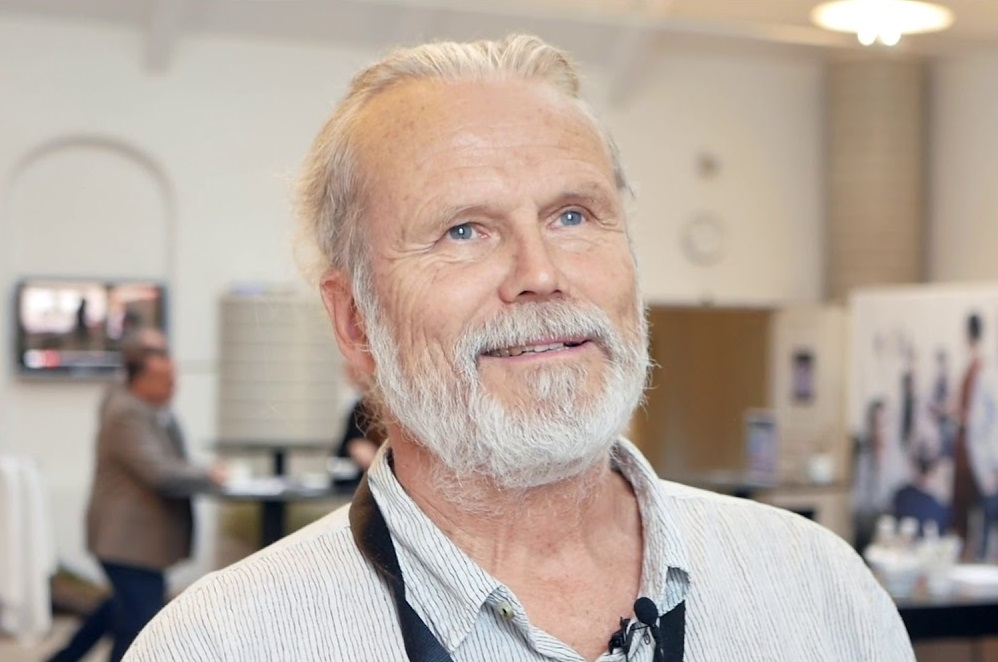
Steen Rasmussen, professor and physicist.

Steen Rasmussen (born 7 July 1955) is a Danish physicist mainly working in the areas of artificial life and complex systems. He is currently a professor in physics and a center director at University of Southern Denmark as well as an external research professor at the Santa Fe Institute. His formal training was at the Technical University of Denmark (1985 PhD in physics of complex systems) and University of Copenhagen (philosophy). He spent 20 years as a researcher at Los Alamos National Laboratory (1988-2007), the last five years as a leader of the Self-Organized Systems team. He has been part of the Santa Fe Institute since 1988.

Since 2001, Rasmussen’s main scientific effort has been to explore, understand and construct a transition from nonliving to living materials. Bridging this gap requires an interdisciplinary scientific effort, which is why he has assembled, sponsored and led research teams in the US, across Europe and in Denmark. He became a scientific team leader in 2002 at Los Alamos National Laboratory, USA. He has since held research leadership positions at the Santa Fe Institute, University of Copenhagen and University of Southern Denmark. In 2004 he represented Los Alamos National Laboratory scientifically in cofounding together with primarily European scientific institutions the European Centre for Living Technology in Venice, Italy where he later served as Chairman of the Science Board. Since late 2007 he has been the director of the Center for Fundamental Living Technology at University of Southern Denmark.

Rasmussen has for many years been actively engaged in the public discourse regarding science and society and on this background he founded The Initiative for Science, Society and Policy (ISSP) in 2009. ISSP is currently funded by two Danish universities, has a Director, five Science Focus Leaders and a Science Board. In 2018 he received the Lifetime Achievement Award from the International Society of Artificial Life (ISAL).
