= Achuthsankar S. Nair =

Indian academic, Head of the Department of Bioinformatics at the University of Kerala

Dr. Achuthsankar S. Nair
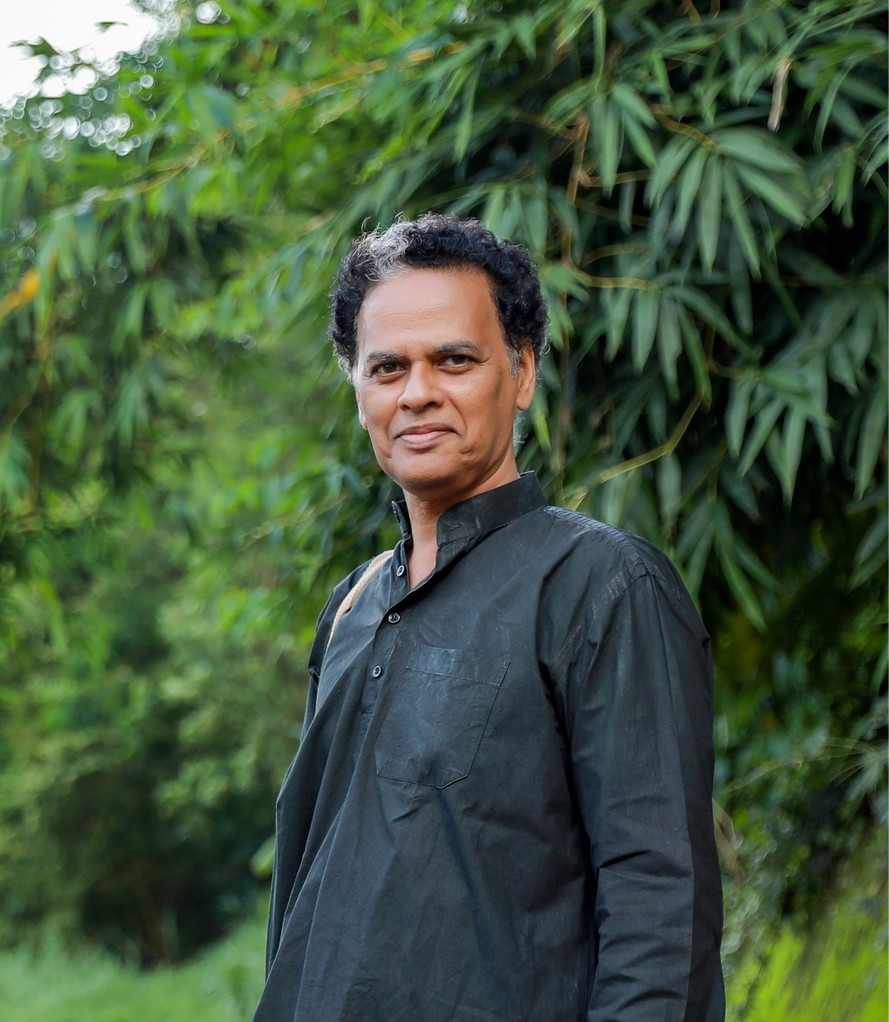
- Born: 1964 (age 61–62); Thiruvananthapuram, Kerala, India
- Occupations: Scholar; Writer; Teacher; Researcher
- Title: Director of Centre for Development of Imaging Technology (C-DIT)
- Predecessor: T. Balakrishnan, IAS (Rtd.)
- Successor: E.K. Bharath Bhooshan, IAS (Rtd.)
- Website: Achuthsankar

Achuthsankar S. Nair is an Indian academic and former Director of the Centre for Development of Imaging Technology (C-DIT), Government of Kerala, for a period of three years from November 2001 to October 2004, during which he led several information technology development initiatives.

He served as Head of the Department of Bioinformatics at the University of Kerala. He has also served as Chairman of the Computer Society of India, Trivandrum chapter.

Nair is the author of more than 20 books in English and Malayalam, in addition to scholarly articles and a number of research publications co-authored with his students.

== Early life and education ==
Nair was born in a Malayali family as a child of Dr. A. Sukumaran Nair, former Vice-Chancellor of Mahatma Gandhi University and former Pro-vice-chancellor of the University of Kerala, and Komalam S Nair at Vanchiyoor in Thiruvananthapuram, Kerala.

He obtained his B.Tech in Electrical Engineering from the College of Engineering, Trivandrum, and his M.Tech from the Indian Institute of Technology Bombay. He later earned an M.Phil. in Computer Speech and Language Processing from the University of Cambridge, and a Ph.D. from the University of Kerala. He holds two doctoral degrees - one in Engineering and another in Music.

Nair's wife, Hema Ramachandran, was an engineering lecturer. His daughter, Gayathri, is a B.Ed. student. His son, Aditya, is a student of history.

== Career ==
Nair held academic positions as a Professor in Electrical Engineering and Computer Science, and was instrumental in establishing the discipline of Bioinformatics at the University of Kerala. He also served as a visiting professor at the University of Korea, South Korea, FTMS - De Montfort University, Malaysia, and Daito Bunka University, Japan.

He is a prolific science writer and an interdisciplinary scholar; his publications span a wide range of subjects, including Electrical Engineering, Computer Science, Bioinformatics, Microhistory, and Carnatic music. Nair's research contributions in bio-sequence analysis include work in gene prediction, pattern recognition, and data compression.

== Bibliography ==
=== Books ===
1. A Life in Pedagogy: Biography of Prof. A. Sukumaran Nair. Infinity Indica Publishers. 26 Jan 2025. ASIN B0DTYWQ58T.
2. Campus Politics - Don't Be Silent, Don't Be Violent. Infinity Indica Publishers. 1 Jan 2022. ASIN B0B7582Z31.
3. Malayalam Meter - A Modern Pedagogic Introduction. Infinity Indica Publishers. 1 Jan 2022. ASIN B0BF3KW16J.
4. Swathi Thirunal - A Composer Born to a Mother. Kerala Bhasha Institute. 1 Jan 2021. ASIN B096KXLZ96.
5. Free Software and GNU/Linux (Malayalam)
6. Tharippu (in Malayalam). Olive Publications. 1 Jan 2019. ASIN B097CLQ6C8.
7. "Innovation in University of Kerala (Ebook)" (PDF). University of Kerala. 2016.
8. Data Structures in C. Prentice Hall India Learning Private Limited. 1 Dec 2009. ASIN 8120336429.
9. Adithya Sankar; Achuth Sankar S Nair; Komalam S Nair (1 Jan 2020). Vanchiyoor Vignettes - Local History of a Bygone Village. TailWind Academy Pvt Ltd. ASIN 9354265812.
10. Hema Ramachandran; Achuthsankar S Nair (30 Oct 2011). SCILAB (A Free Software alternative to MATLAB). S Chand Publishing. ASIN 8121939704.
11. What is your Name?. Information Theory for Kids.
12. Njanum urumbum koodi maram chuttiyappol (in Malayalam). Fractals for Kids.
13. Idichakkaplamootile rajakumari thanthram padichathengane? (in Malayalam). Information Theory for Kids.
14. Information Technology (in Malayalam). 1997.
15. Googolavalkaranam (in Malayalam). 27 May 2024. ASIN B0D5D624RF.
16. Computer parichayavum prayogavum (in Malayalam). Computer Literacy.
17. Achuthsankar S. Nair; S. Gopakumar. C Programming padichu thudangam (in Malayalam). Kerala Bhasha Institute.
18. Achuthsankar S. Nair; K. Madanan. Electronics fundamentals (in Malayalam). Kerala Bhasha Institute.
19. Internet (in Malayalam). 1996.
20. Python - A Pedagogic Introduction
21. Machine and Deep Learning

=== Articles ===
- S. Nair, Achuthsankar; Jayachandran, Ashwini; T.R., Aswathy (July 2021). "Green synthesis and characterization of zinc oxide nanoparticles using Cayratia pedata leaf extract". Biochemistry and Biophysics Reports. 26 100995. doi:10.1016/j.bbrep.2021.100995. PMC 8055550. PMID 33898767.
- S. Nair, Achuthsankar; Biji, C.L.; Shahina, K (1 Jan 2025). "A comparative study on the classification of SARS-CoV-2 variants from biosequence images using pre-trained deep learning models". International Journal of Bioinformatics Research and Applications. 21 (1) 144026. doi:10.1504/ijbra.2025.144026.
- S. Nair, Achuthsankar; G. Nadh, Anuroopa; Revikumar, Amjesh; Sudhakaran, P.R. (1 Jun 2022). "Identification of potential lead compounds against BACE1 through in-silico screening of phytochemicals of Medhya rasayana plants for Alzheimer's disease management". Computers in Biology and Medicine. 145 (C) 105422. doi:10.1016/j.compbiomed.2022.105422. PMID 35354103.
- S. Nair, Achuthsankar; Biji, C.L. (1 Nov 2017). "Benchmark Dataset for Whole Genome Sequence Compression". IEEE/ACM Transactions on Computational Biology and Bioinformatics. 14 (6) 2568186. Bibcode:2017ITCBB..14.1228C. doi:10.1109/TCBB.2016.2568186. PMID 27214907.
- S. Nair, Achuthsankar; Biji, C.L.; P.R., Arun; George, Jojo (9 Nov 2015). "NGS read data compression using parallel computing algorithm". 2015 IEEE International Conference on Bioinformatics and Biomedicine (BIBM). doi:10.1109/BIBM.2015.7359890. ISBN 978-1-4673-6799-8.
- S. Nair, Achuthsankar; V. Nair, Vrinda (15 Feb 2010). "Combined classifier for unknown genome classification using chaos game representation features". Proceedings of the International Symposium on Biocomputing. doi:10.1145/1722024.1722065. ISBN 978-1-60558-722-6.
- S. Nair, Achuthsankar; V. Nair, Vrinda; Vijayan, Karthika; P. Gopinath, Deepa (9 Feb 2010). "ANN Based Classification of Unknown Genome Fragments Using Chaos Game Representation". 2010 Second International Conference on Machine Learning and Computing. pp. 81–85. doi:10.1109/ICMLC.2010.56. ISBN 978-1-4244-6006-9.
- S. Nair, Achuthsankar; Jayasudha, J.S. (13 Dec 2007). "Effect of Window Size on the Performance of a Turbo Equalizer Using a SWMAP Algorithm". International Conference on Computational Intelligence and Multimedia Applications (ICCIMA 2007). Vol. 04. pp. 334–341. doi:10.1109/ICCIMA.2007.172. ISBN 978-0-7695-3050-5.
- S. Nair, Achuthsankar; P. Gopinath, Deepa; Divya Sree, J.; Mathew, Reshmi; Rekhila, S. J. (18 Dec 2006). "Duration Analysis for Malayalam Text-To-Speech Systems". 9th International Conference on Information Technology (ICIT'06). Vol. 04. pp. 129–132. doi:10.1109/ICIT.2006.48. ISBN 0-7695-2635-7.

== Awards ==
Nair is a recipient of Government of Kerala's Young Scientist Award (1991), Engineering Teacher's National Award (1994) from the Indian Society for Technical Education (ISTE), National Teacher's Award (2013) from the Indian National Science Academy (INSA), the Award for Excellence in Social Service (2014) from the Vakkom Moulavi Foundation, and P.T Bhaskara Panicker Award (2019).

== See also ==
- Achuthsankar S. Nair publications indexed by Google Scholar
- 204 publications by ResearchGate
- 22 published works in IEEE Xplore
- 8 publications in Association of Computing Machinery (ACM)
