= Health and welfare trust =

A Health and welfare trust (HAWT) or Health and welfare plan (HAWP) is a Canadian tax-free vehicle for financing a corporation's healthcare costs for their employees. They were introduced in 1986 by Canada Revenue Agency (CRA) in their interpretation bulletin entitled IT-85R2. Many companies offer this product to Canadian employers.

== Structure ==
A HWT is a bank account established exclusively for the purpose of health care spending. They are a part of the family of health spending accounts in the world of group benefits in Canada.

A Health & Welfare Trust (HWT) is an arrangement through which an employer can provide certain benefit programs to employees, including a private health services plan ("PHSP") as defined under the Canada Revenue Agency (CRA) guidelines. One or more employees may be covered under an HWT. An HWT is a specific trust that satisfies certain requirements as set out in CRA guidelines (specifically paragraph 6 of the Interpretation Bulletin IT-85R2 - Health and Welfare Trusts for Employees)

These requirements are as follows:

(a) The funds of the HWT cannot revert to the employer or be used for any purpose other than providing the health and welfare benefits for which the contributions are made;

(b) The employer's contributions to the fund must not exceed the amounts required to provide the benefits;

(c) The payment made by the employer cannot be made on a voluntary or gratuitous basis. In other words, once the payment plan is established it cannot change during the policy year. The contributions must be enforceable by trustees should the employer decide not to make the payments required;

(d) The trust is a legal arrangement between the employer, a third-party acting as the administrator and an independent trustee. The expenses to be paid out of the trust must qualify as medical expenses as defined by CRA (specifically subsection 118.2(2) of the Act).

== Tax Issues ==
The basic rule regarding taxes as per Canada Revenue Agency (CRA) guidelines (specifically Paragraph 6(1) (a) of the Act) provides that an employee must include in the employee's income (from employment for a taxation year) the value of all benefits received or enjoyed by the employee in the year of his or her employment. However, as per the CRA (specifically IT 85R2, paragraph 8),

"……contributions to a health and welfare trust by an employer using the accrual method of computing income are deductible in the taxation year in which the legal obligation to make the contributions arose."

Furthermore, as per IT 85R2, paragraph 9c) ...

"Benefits provided to an employee under a private health services plan are also not subject to tax. Therefore employer contributions to the HWT are considered non-taxable benefits to the employees."

The basic rules above will apply to individuals providing services as an employee to an employer whether the employer is a corporation, an individual or a partnership. The level of coverage must be reasonable relative to the services provided.

In summary, in the case of an HWT:

1. Reasonable contributions into the HWT are tax deductible by the corporation
2. The net amount contributed can be spent by the employees and their dependants for medical expenses on a tax free basis

== Participation Rules ==
A corporation may provide benefits under an HWT to an individual who is both an employee and a shareholder of the corporation. These benefits may be received for income tax purposes by the individual in his or her capacity as an employee or as a shareholder.

The tax consequences will be different from the basic rules described above if corporate employer paid benefits are received by an individual in his or her capacity as the shareholder. A taxable shareholder benefit would arise to that individual. The contributions will not be deductible to the corporation. It is a question of fact as to whether these benefits are received for income tax purposes by the individual in his or her capacity as an employee or as a shareholder.

The Canada Revenue Agency (CRA) starts with the presumption that the benefit is received in the individual's capacity as a shareholder. It is required by the corporate employer and the employee/shareholder to demonstrate that the HWT benefits are being provided to the individual in his or her capacity as an employee and that the expenses are reasonable in the circumstances. If non-shareholder employees are excluded from coverage, there is a significant risk that the benefits provided to the employee/shareholder will be regarded as being received by him or her by virtue of his/her shareholdings. If, however, the employee/shareholders are of a different class of employees (e.g. executives) from the rest of the employees, it might be possible to justify excluding the non-shareholder employees or providing a lower level of benefits to them.

Only one employee is required. As per Canada Revenue Agency (CRA) guidelines (specifically section 7 of 85R2) two or more employees must be covered only in the case of a group sickness or accident plan, or group term life insurance. In the case of an HWT only one employee is required.

== Insurance ==
As per paragraph Canada Revenue Agency (CRA) guidelines (specifically – section 7 of IT 428) it is not necessary for the HWT to be a contract of insurance – the plan must be one that is based on insurance principles. The principle is that funds must be accumulated in the hands of trustees or in a trust account calculated to be sufficient to meet anticipated needs.

== Funding ==
The employer shall make contributions to the Trust for a "plan year" in an amount, which together with employee contributions, if any, are required to provide the benefits under the plans to eligible employees of the employer and their dependants. Each employee shall be allocated a "plan year" not to exceed twelve months. The amount contributed must be reasonable given the employment services performed by the employee.

The employer's contribution into the HWT must not exceed the amounts required to provide benefits. The contribution amount is an annual declaration and the amount cannot be amended during the twelve month policy year unless there is a life change (i.e. change in dependant requirement – Birth or Death or addition of a dependant) within the employee's household unit. In addition, the trustee can enforce the employer to make the contributions during the policy year.

At the start of a subsequent policy year, a new contribution level is set. If the amount spent is less than the contribution amount, the unused amount can be carried forward into the following year. As well, if a medical expense was incurred in excess of the amount contributed, the un-reimbursed claim can be carried forward and the contribution in a subsequent year can be used to reimburse the employee.

== Eligible Expenses ==
The most common definition of a medical expense is a payment made to a licensed medical practitioner qualified to practice under the provincial laws of the place where the expenses were incurred. Medical expenses eligible to be paid out of the HWT are expenses which would otherwise qualify as medical expenses within section 118.2(2) of the Income Tax Act. Some of the basic healthcare expenditures covered by an HSA include...

=== Prescription Medicines, Drugs, & Vitamins ===
Generally, payments for prescription medicines and drugs ( i.e. over the counter drugs) qualify as medical expenses if purchased by the employee, their spouse, or their dependant, as prescribed by a medical practitioner and as recorded by a licensed pharmacist.

In the case of insulin, oxygen and liver extract injectable or vitamin B12 for pernicious anemia, no prescription is required.

If vitamins are prescribed by a medical practitioner, but not purchased from a pharmacist who has recorded the prescription in a prescription record, then the expense is not an eligible medical expense. However, in recent court cases, they can allow the eligibility of prescribed vitamins, herbs, bottled water, organic and natural foods and not dispensed by a pharmacist if the items are required to sustain the life of the user. It is not eligible if it is simply to satisfy a lifestyle the user has chosen.

=== Vision ===
Eyeglasses, if prescribed, are eligible medical expenses.

=== Dental ===
An amount paid to a dentist, dental hygienist, dental surgeon or dental mechanic for dental services provided to the patient (to the extent that the fees are for diagnostic, therapeutic or rehabilitative services) are eligible medical expenses.

=== Professional Services ===
An amount paid to a licensed medical practitioner is an eligible medical expense. They can include depending on the provincial jurisdiction:

• Chiropractor • Audiologist • Chiropodist • Christian Science Practitioner • Dentist • Dental Hygienist • Dental Technician • Denturist • Dietician • Osteopath • Physiotherapist • Podiatrist • Psychiatrist • Psychoanalyst • Physician and Surgeon • Psychologist • Radiologist • Massage Therapist • Midwife • Neurologist • Occupational Therapist • Optician • Speech Therapist • Registered Nurse • Respiratory Therapist • Naturopath

All medical doctors, medical practitioners, dentists, pharmacists, nurses or optometrists must be authorized to practice under the laws of the provincial jurisdiction where the service is rendered, in order for the medical expenses to be eligible.

=== Cosmetic Surgery ===
As of March 2010, expenses incurred for "purely cosmetic" reasons are generally no longer eligible, even if performed by a licensed medical practitioner. The reason for this change is that most PHSPs follow the CRA eligibility rules pertaining to the Medical Expense Tax Credit *(METC). In the March 2010 federal budget cosmetic procedures were made ineligible for the METC. Previously, an amount paid to a medical practitioner for surgery of any kind, whether cosmetic or elective did generally qualify as a medical expense. It was presumed that such surgery was carried out for a valid medical reason. Such surgeries included botox, facelifts, liposuction, rhinoplasty, breast augmentation as well as hair transplant/replacement. As of October 2010, there remains some confusion over how to apply these rules in the context of PHSPs.

=== Transportation Costs ===
In addition to ambulance charges to and from hospitals, eligible medical expenses include any commercial transport service transporting a patient and an attendant (if medically necessary to accompany the patient) to a clinic/hospital/doctor's office. The distance traveled must be in excess of 40 km to obtain such equivalent service not readily available closer to home. If the distance traveled is in excess of 80 km, the eligible costs would include meals and accommodation, in addition to transportation expenses.

=== Insurance Premiums ===
Premiums paid to a non-government medical or hospital care group plan are eligible medical expenses.

== Set up ==
There is no formal registration procedure for setting up a HAWT in Canada. Many private corporations are willing to help for a fee. An example of a board resolution setting up a HAWT can be found here.

== Dependants ==
The employee can submit medical claims for him/herself and any of his/her dependents that are defined as:

1. Any dependent child or grandchild of the employee or their spouse
2. Any Canadian resident (at any time in the year) parent, grandparent, brother, sister, uncle, aunt, niece or nephew of the employee or their spouse who was dependent on them at any time during the year.

== Popularity and Growth ==
For years, HSAs have been a part of Canadian group health plans - primarily as a part of Flex Benefit or cafeteria plans. These HSAs have been part of what is commonly referred to as a notional credit model. The "notional credit" model, outlined in the Canada Revenue Agency IT-bulletin entitled IT-529 was designed to allow companies to add an HSA to a Flex Benefits Plan as an additional benefit for items not covered under the traditional group benefits plan.

== Providers of HWTs & PHSPs ==
Today, numerous insurers and administrators provide various versions of a HWT to Canadian employers. Few insurers or administrators exist with expertise in the areas of both HWTs and PHSPs.

== Costs ==
Hub Financial charges a $250 start up fee (but many do not) and then adds 10% to the cost of the medical expenses plus taxes.

== See also ==
- Healthcare in Canada
- Canada Health Transfer
- Healthcare Spending Account
