= Healthcare Spending Account =

Flexible employee benefit program in Canada

A Health Care Spending Account (HCSA), or Healthcare Spending Account (HSA; French: comptes gestion-santé) is a type of flexible employee benefit program in Canada that aims to provide more flexibility than a traditional health plan. As a supplemental program, it covers items that are not normally part of the traditional plan. Generally these plans include a fixed amount per employee available to be claimed, which makes budgeting for them easier for employers. Expenses that can be claimed against an HCSA are regulated by the Canada Revenue Agency.

HSAs can be utilized to supplement insured PHSP, or implemented as "stand-alone" plans instead of insured PHSP. Private PHSP (which may take the form of HSA) may form part of a Health and Welfare Trust (see IT-85R2) or flexible employee benefit program (see IT-529).

== Eligible expenses ==
Eligible expenses are medical expenses which would otherwise qualify as medical expenses within (currently) Section 118.2(2) of the Income Tax Act, and as interpreted by the Canada Revenue Agency (CRA) in Income Tax Folio S1F1C1 "Medical Expenses". These are the same medical expenses as allowed under the Medical Expense Tax Credit (METC) and can be obtained from the CRA website.

HCSA covers expenses connected with health, vision and dental care for employees, their spouses or any dependents (children) qualified by the Canada Revenue Agency. Expenses related to cosmetic surgery, hair removal/regeneration, non-prescription lenses or over-the-counter drugs without an actual prescription signed by registered medical staff, etc. cannot be paid using a Health Care Spending Account.
