= List of diplomatic missions in Switzerland =

This article lists diplomatic missions resident in the Swiss Confederation and that are accredited to Switzerland. At present, the capital city of Bern hosts 91 embassies, while Geneva, which hosts the headquarters of the United Nations in Europe, hosts 65 permanent missions, which are accredited to Switzerland as embassies. Several other countries have ambassadors accredited to Switzerland, with most being resident in Berlin, Brussels or Paris.

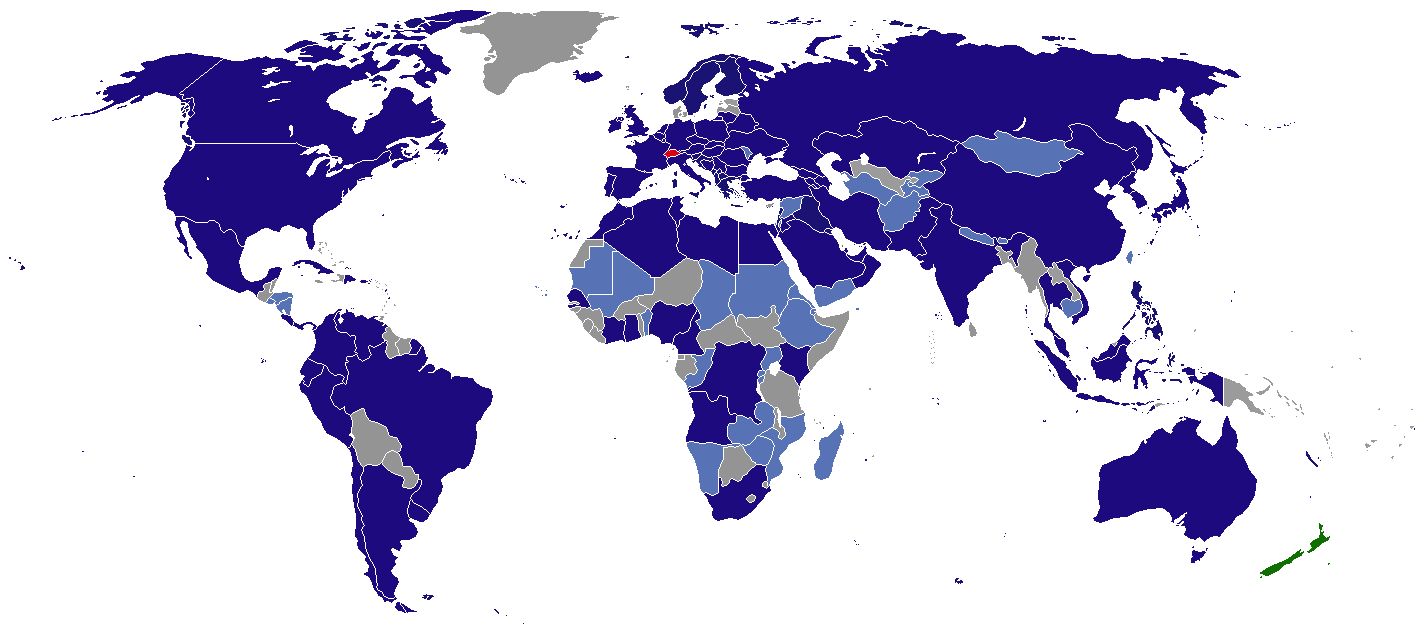
Diplomatic missions in Switzerland Switzerland Countries with embassies in Bern Missions to the UN with accreditation to Switzerland Countries with only consulates-general in Switzerland

== Embassies ==
=== Bern ===
1. Albania
2. Algeria
3. Angola
4. Argentina
5. Armenia
6. Australia
7. Austria
8. Azerbaijan
9. Belarus
10. Belgium
11. Bosnia and Herzegovina
12. Brazil
13. Bulgaria
14. Cameroon
15. Canada
16. Chile
17. China
18. Colombia
19. Congo-Kinshasa
20. Costa Rica
21. Croatia
22. Cuba
23. Czech Republic
24. Dominican Republic
25. Ecuador
26. Egypt
27. Finland
28. France
29. Georgia
30. Germany
31. Ghana
32. Greece
33. Holy See
34. Hungary
35. India
36. Indonesia
37. Iran
38. Iraq
39. Ireland
40. Israel
41. Italy
42. Ivory Coast
43. Japan
44. Jordan
45. Kazakhstan
46. Kenya
47. Kosovo
48. Kuwait
49. Lebanon
50. Libya
51. Liechtenstein
52. Lithuania
53. Luxembourg
54. Malaysia
55. Mexico
56. Monaco
57. Montenegro
58. Morocco
59. Netherlands
60. Nigeria
61. North Korea
62. North Macedonia
63. Norway
64. Oman
65. Pakistan
66. Panama
67. Peru
68. Philippines
69. Poland
70. Portugal
71. Qatar
72. Romania
73. Russia
74. Saudi Arabia
75. Serbia
76. Slovakia
77. Slovenia
78. South Africa
79. South Korea
80. Spain
81. Sweden
82. Thailand
83. Tunisia
84. Turkey
85. Ukraine
86. United Arab Emirates
87. United Kingdom
88. United States
89. Uruguay
90. Venezuela
91. Vietnam

=== Geneva ===
(Missions to the United Nations accredited to Switzerland)

1. Afghanistan
2. Bahamas
3. Bangladesh
4. Barbados
5. Belize
6. Bhutan
7. Botswana
8. Burkina Faso
9. Burundi
10. Cambodia
11. Cape Verde
12. Central African Republic
13. Chad
14. Congo-Brazzaville
15. Djibouti
16. El Salvador
17. Equatorial Guinea
18. Eritrea
19. Eswatini
20. Ethiopia
21. Fiji
22. Gambia
23. Guinea
24. Guyana
25. Honduras
26. Iceland
27. Jamaica
28. Kyrgyzstan
29. Laos
30. Lesotho
31. Madagascar
32. Malawi
33. Maldives
34. Mali
35. Marshall Islands
36. Mauritania
37. Mauritius
38. Micronesia
39. Moldova
40. Mongolia
41. Mozambique
42. Myanmar
43. Namibia
44. Nauru
45. Nepal
46. Nicaragua
47. Niger
48. Rwanda
49. São Tomé and Príncipe
50. San Marino
51. Samoa
52. Senegal
53. Seychelles
54. Sierra Leone
55. Somalia
56. South Sudan
57. Sudan
58. Tajikistan
59. Timor-Leste
60. Togo
61. Turkmenistan
62. Uganda
63. Vanuatu
64. Yemen
65. Zambia

== Representative offices ==
- Catalonia (Delegation)
- European Union (Delegation)
- Hong Kong (Economic & Trade Office)
- Macau (Economic & Trade Office)
- Palestine (Mission)
- Taiwan (Taipei Economic and Cultural Office)
- Turkish Republic of Northern Cyprus (Representative Office)

== Gallery ==
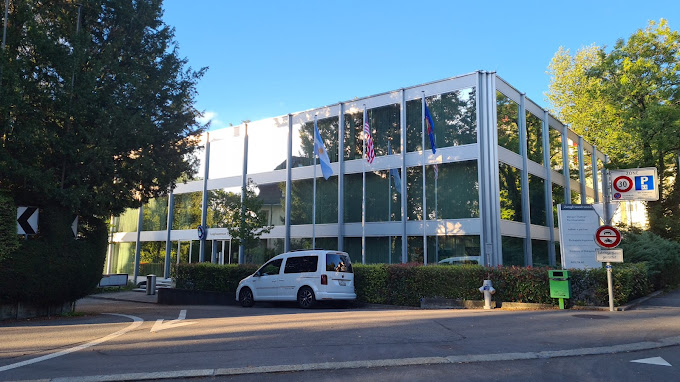
Embassies of Argentina and Malaysia

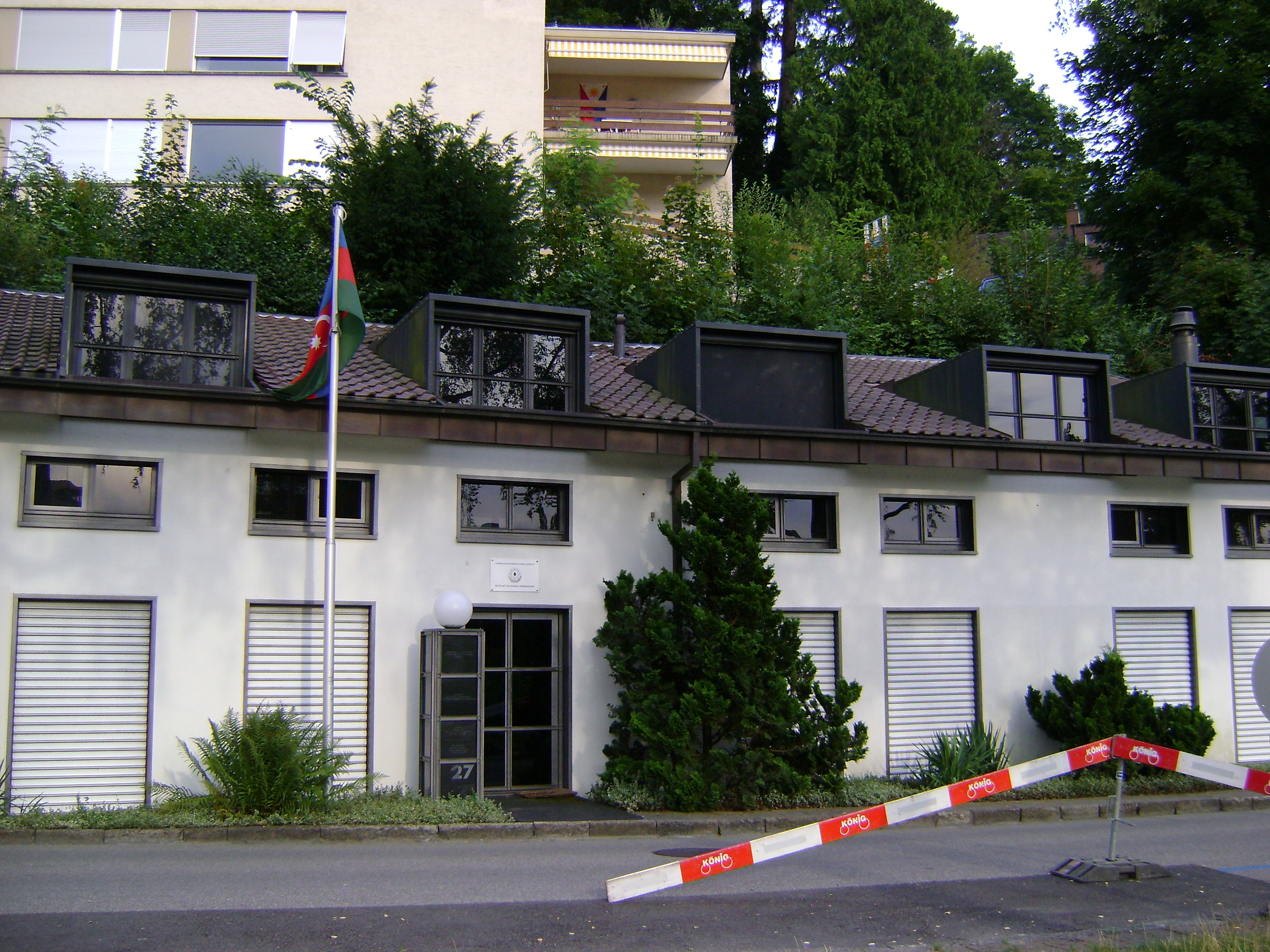
Embassy of Azerbaijan

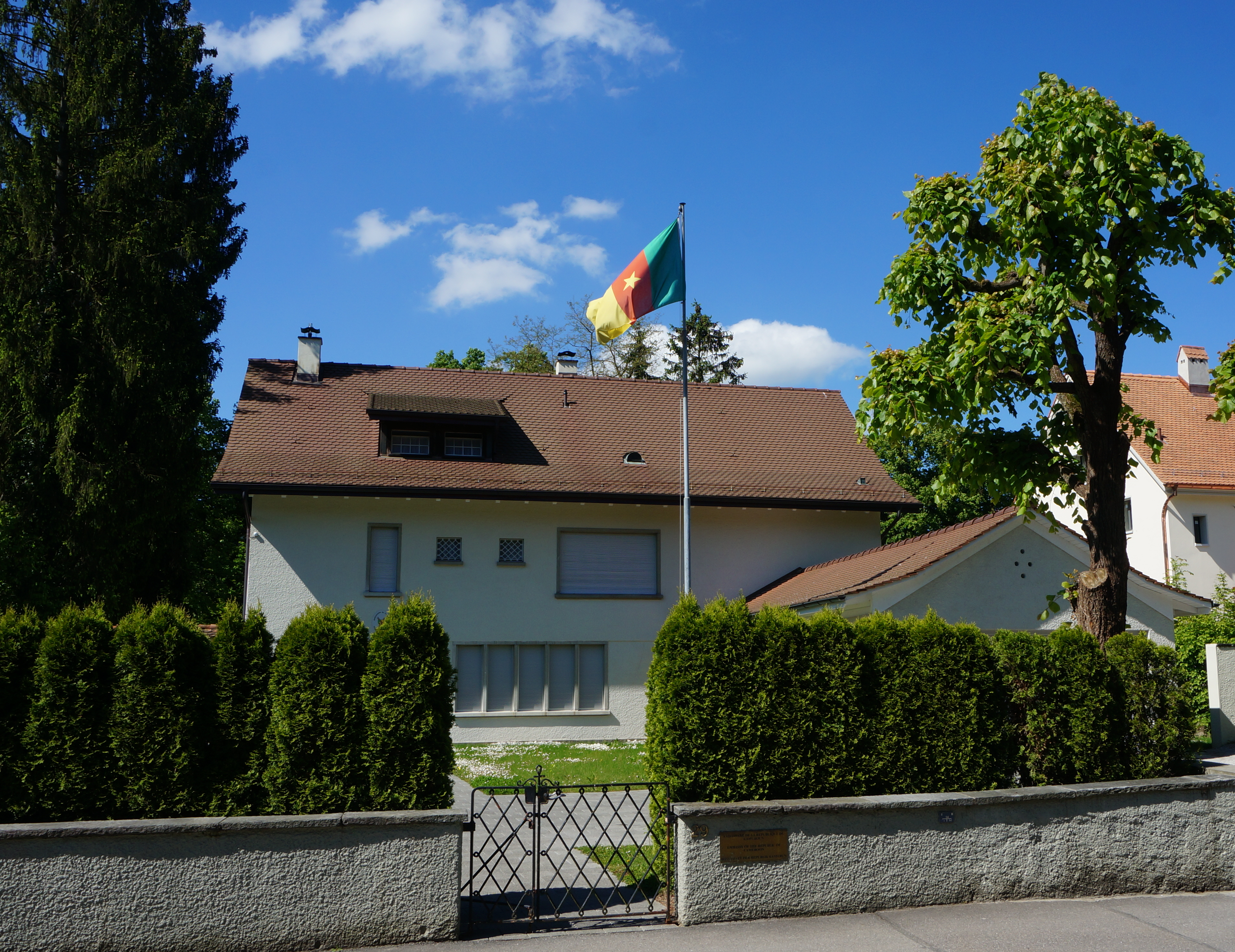
Embassy of Cameroon

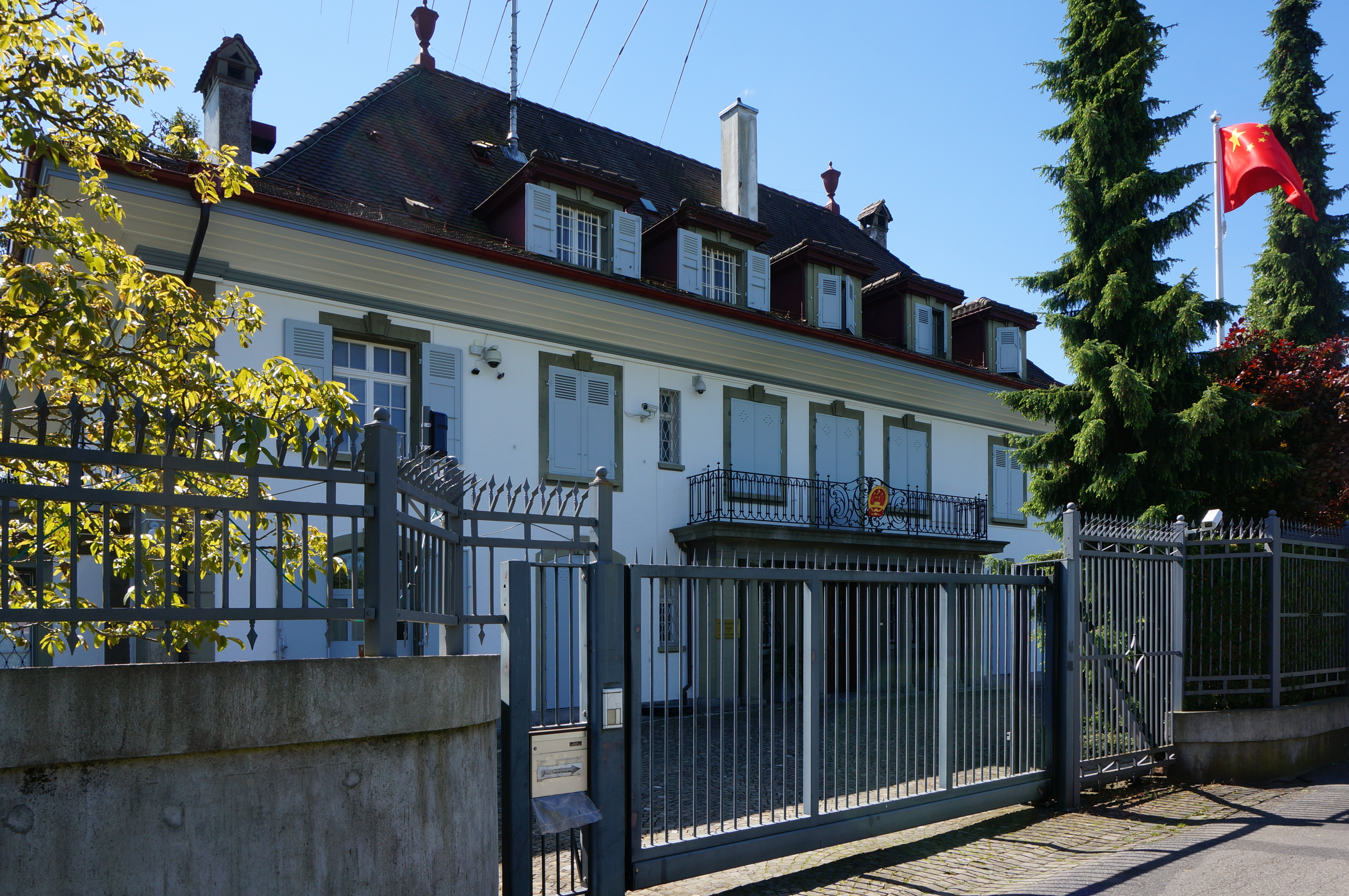
Embassy of China

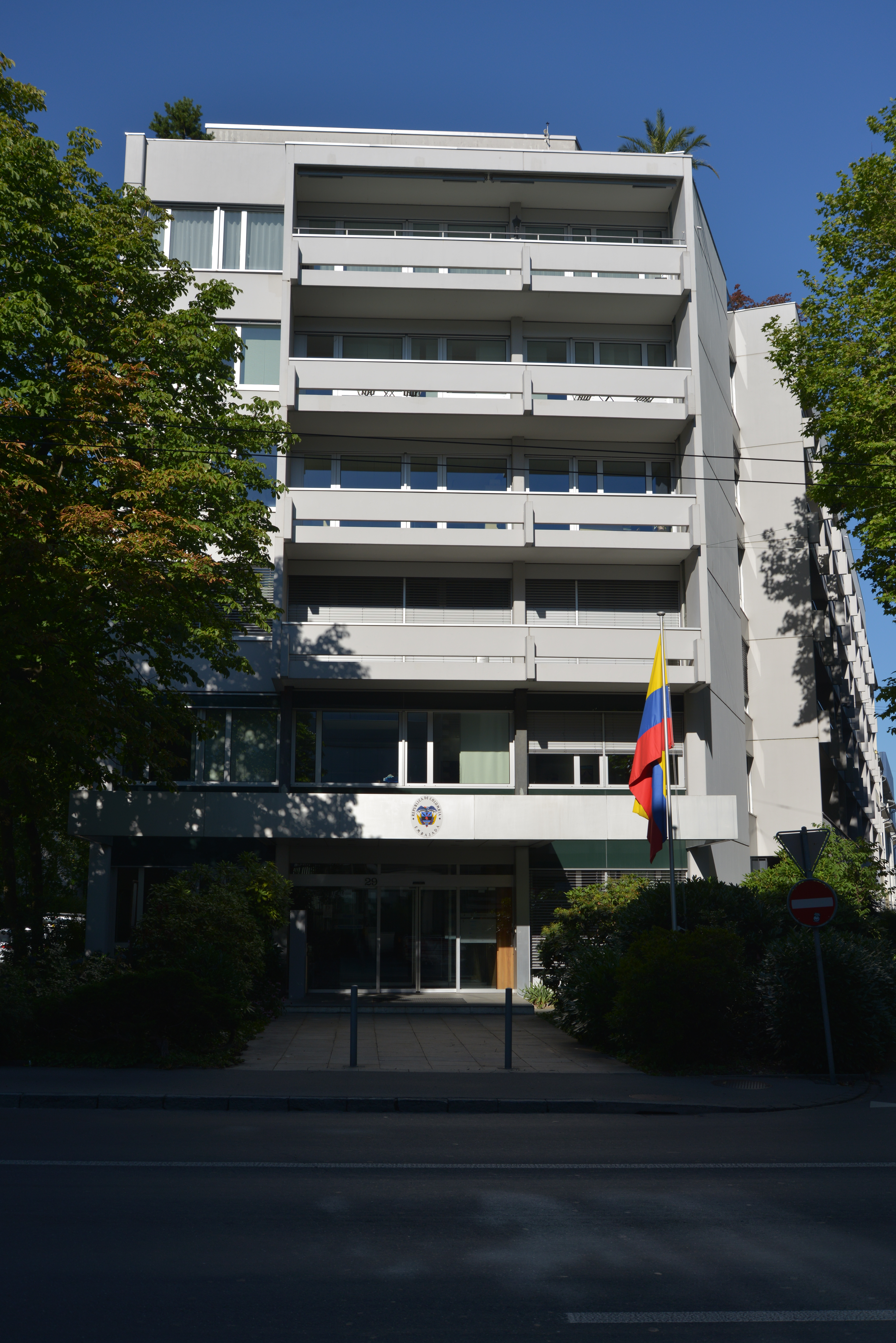
Embassy of Colombia

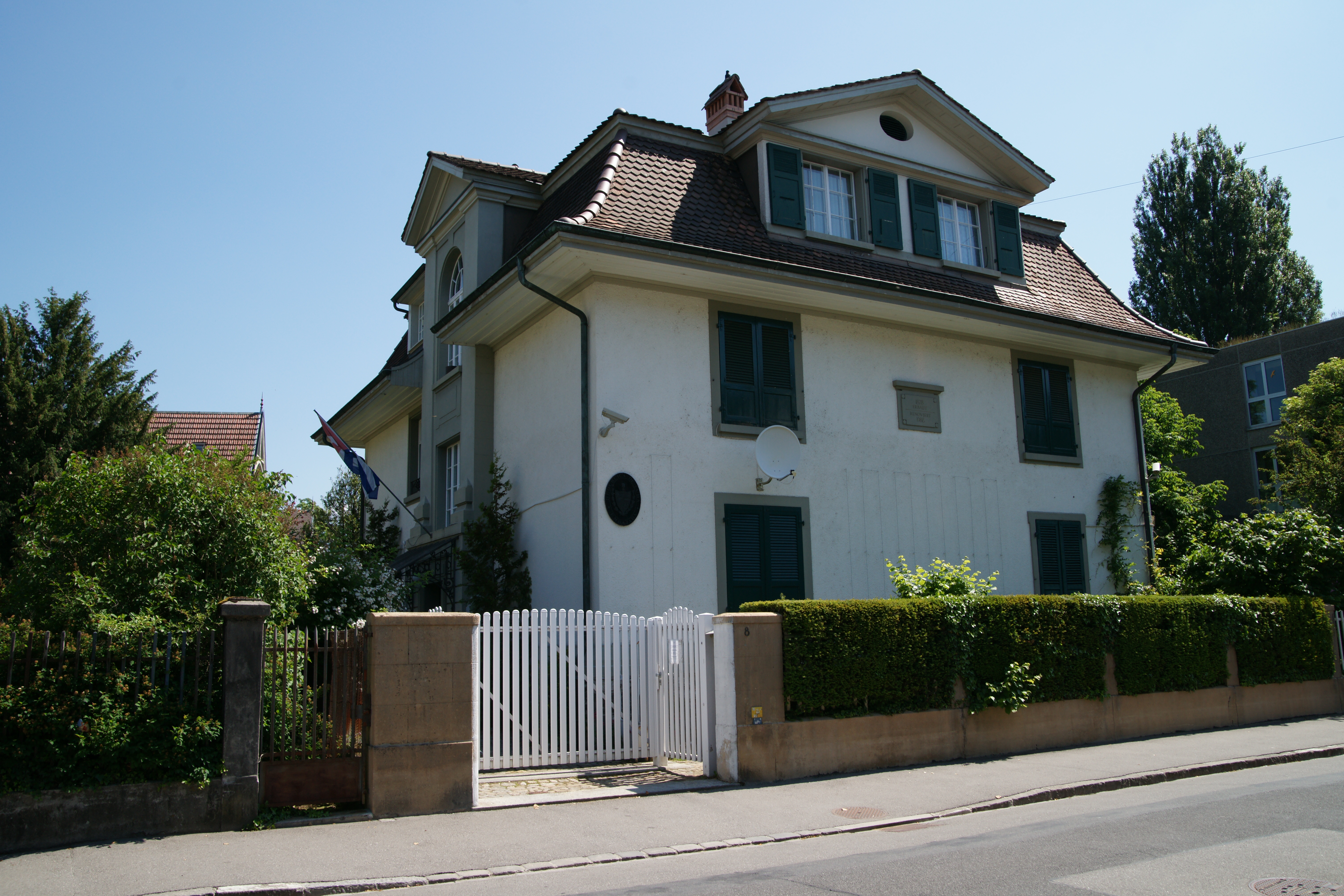
Embassy of Cuba

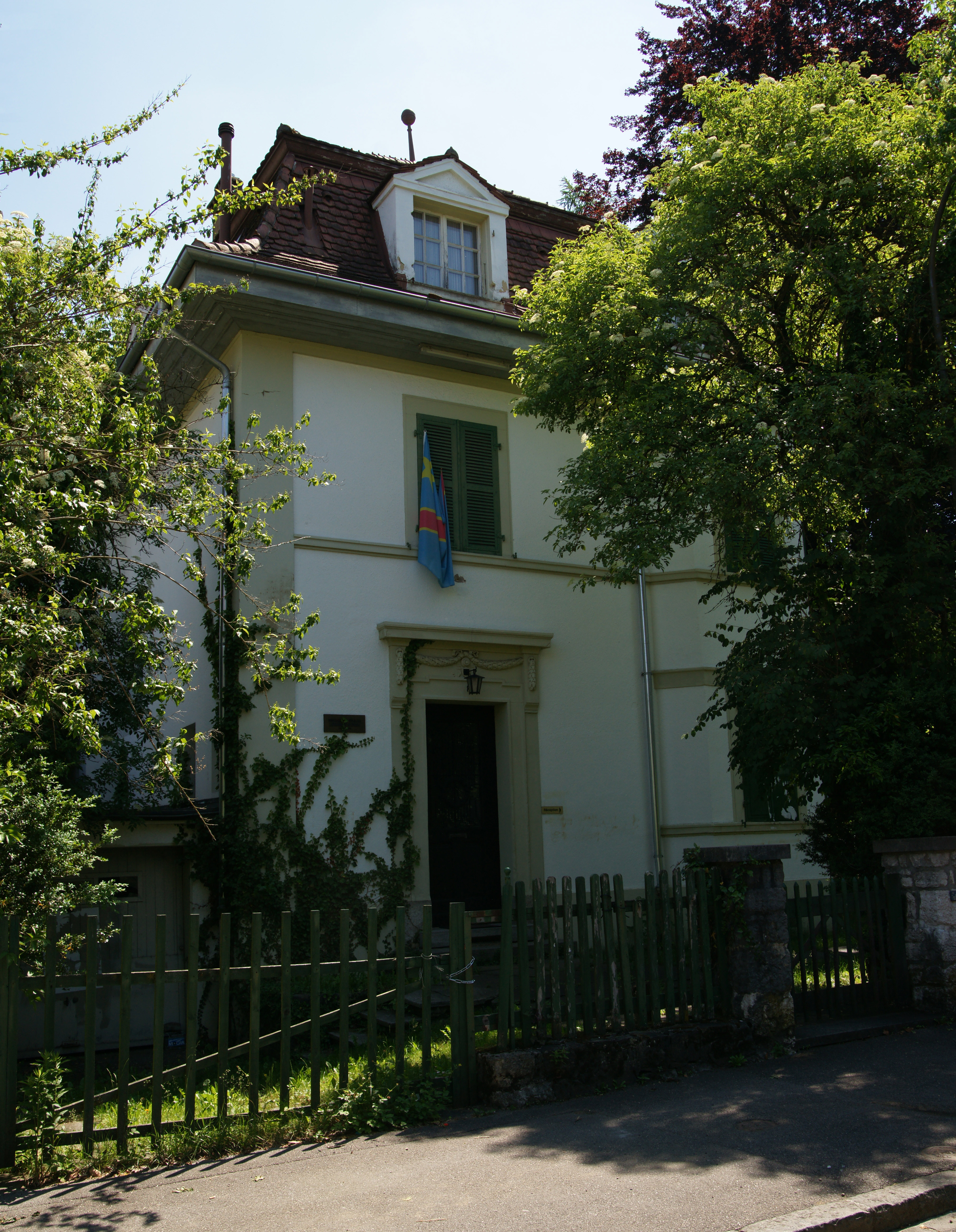
Embassy of Congo-Kinshasa

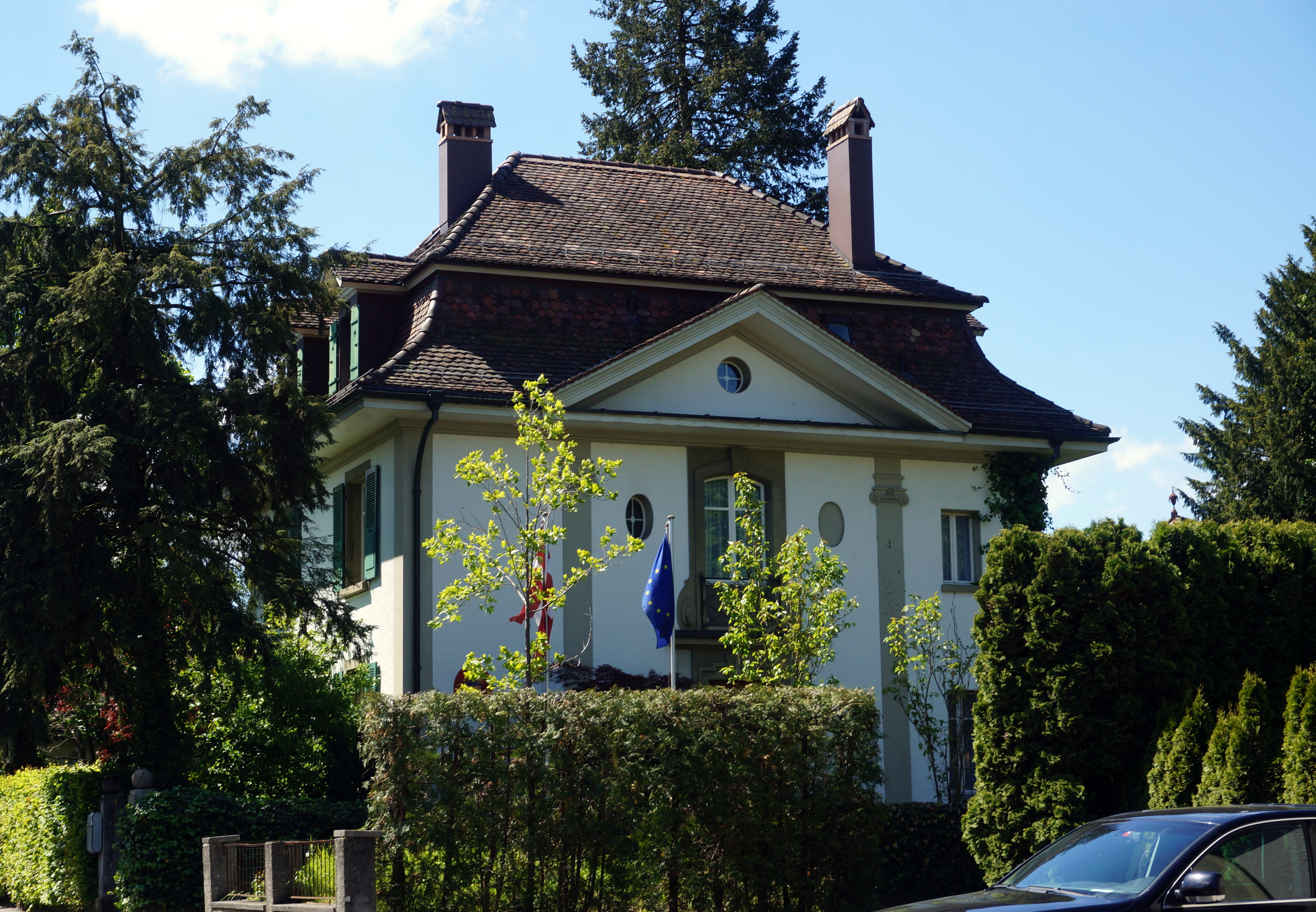
Embassy of Denmark

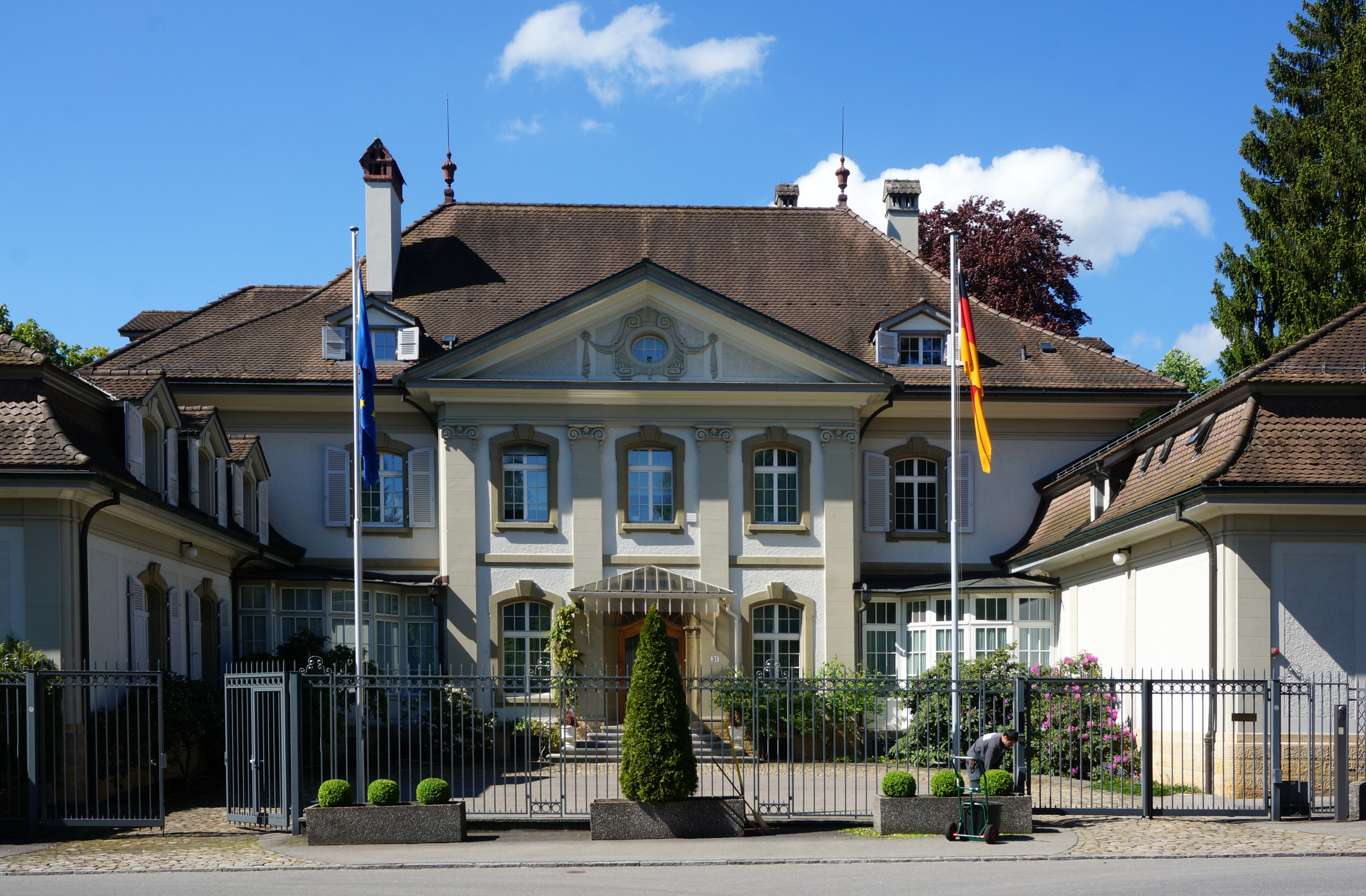
Embassy of Germany

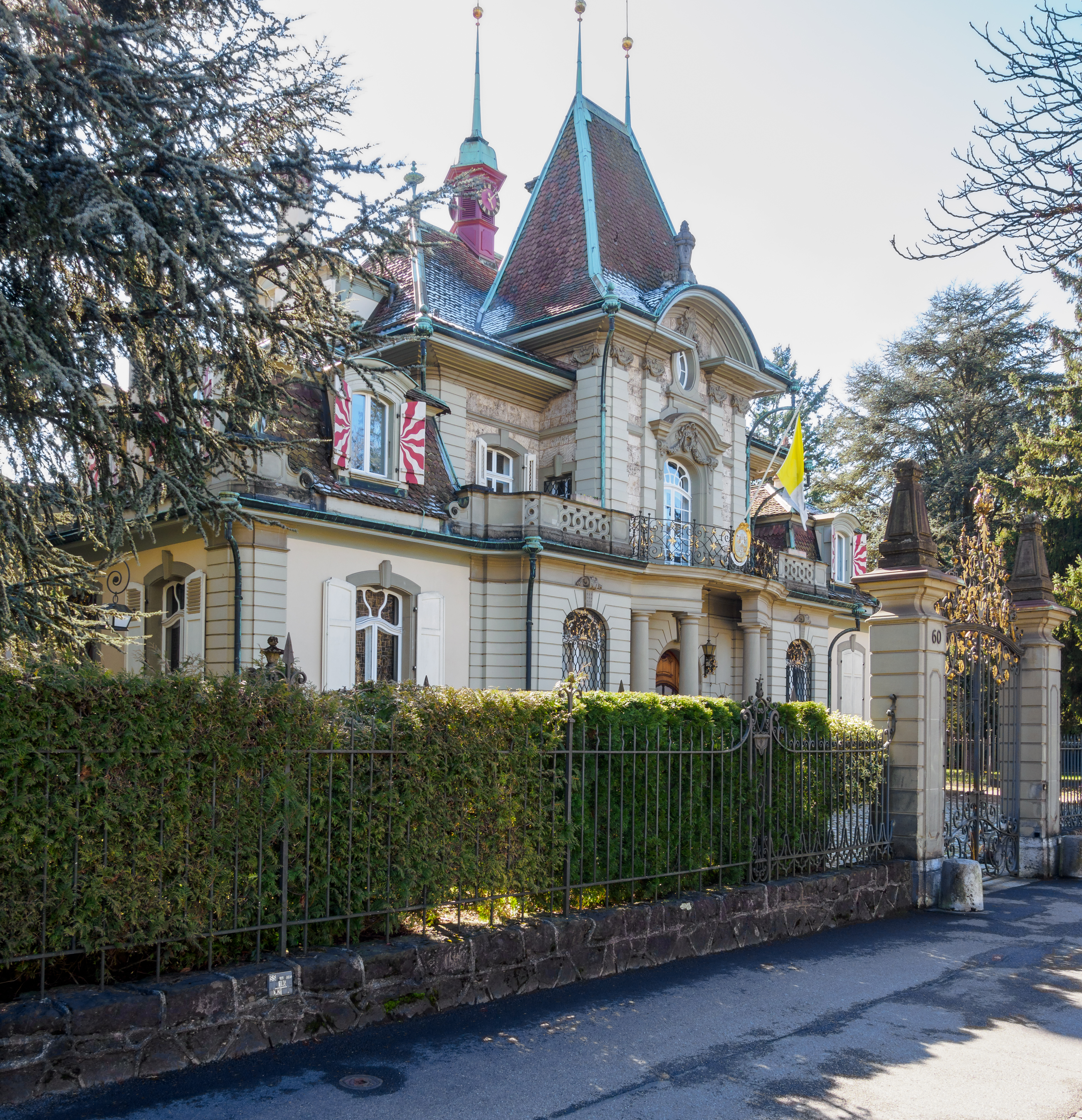
Apostolic Nunciature of the Holy See

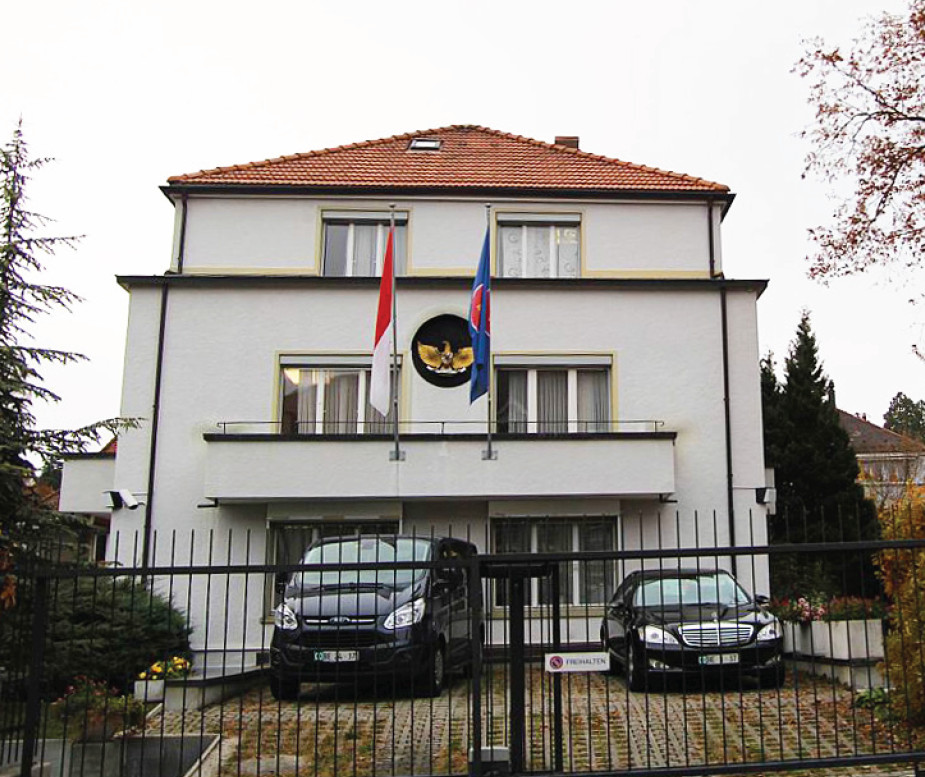
Embassy of Indonesia

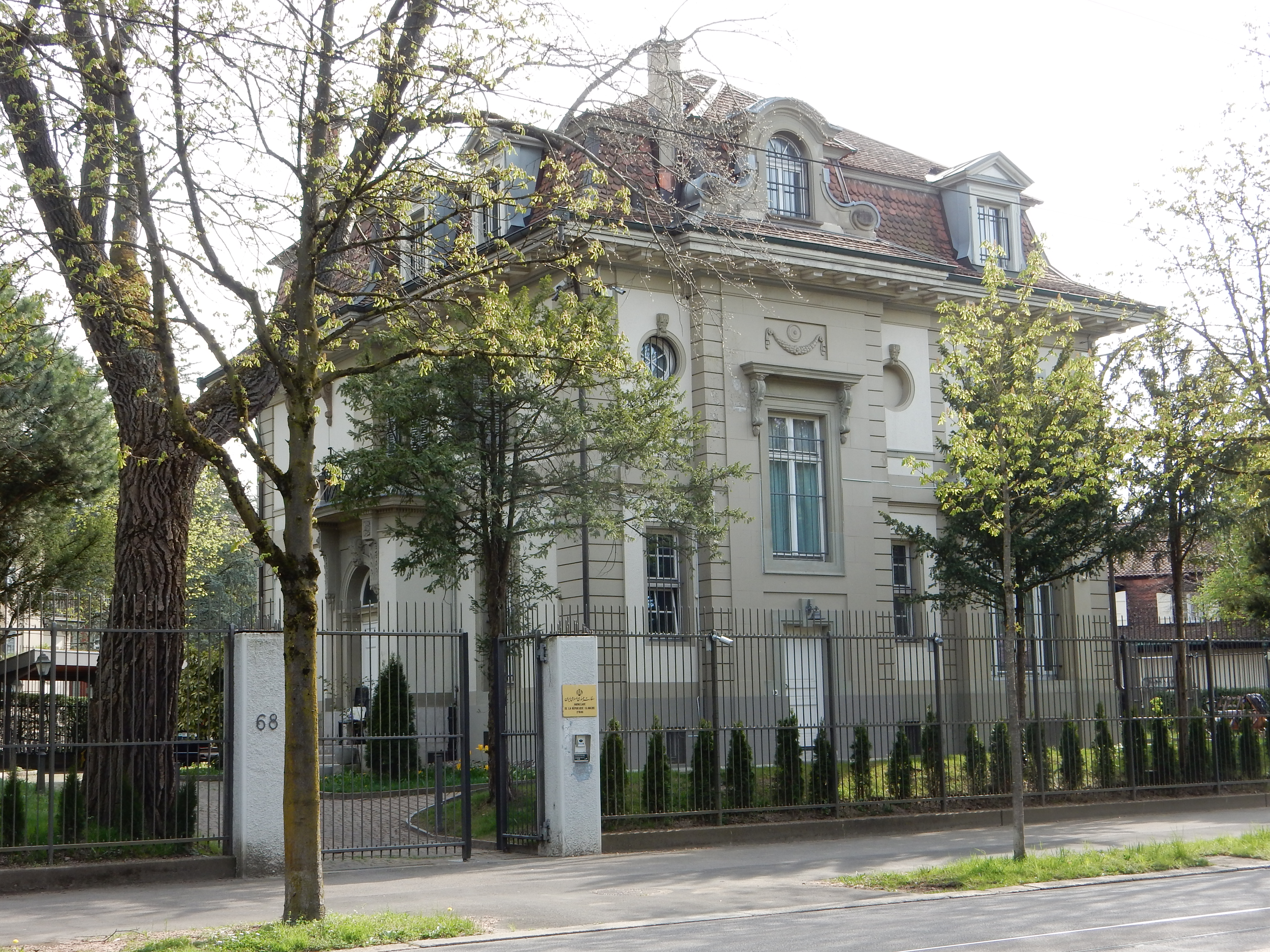
Embassy of Iran

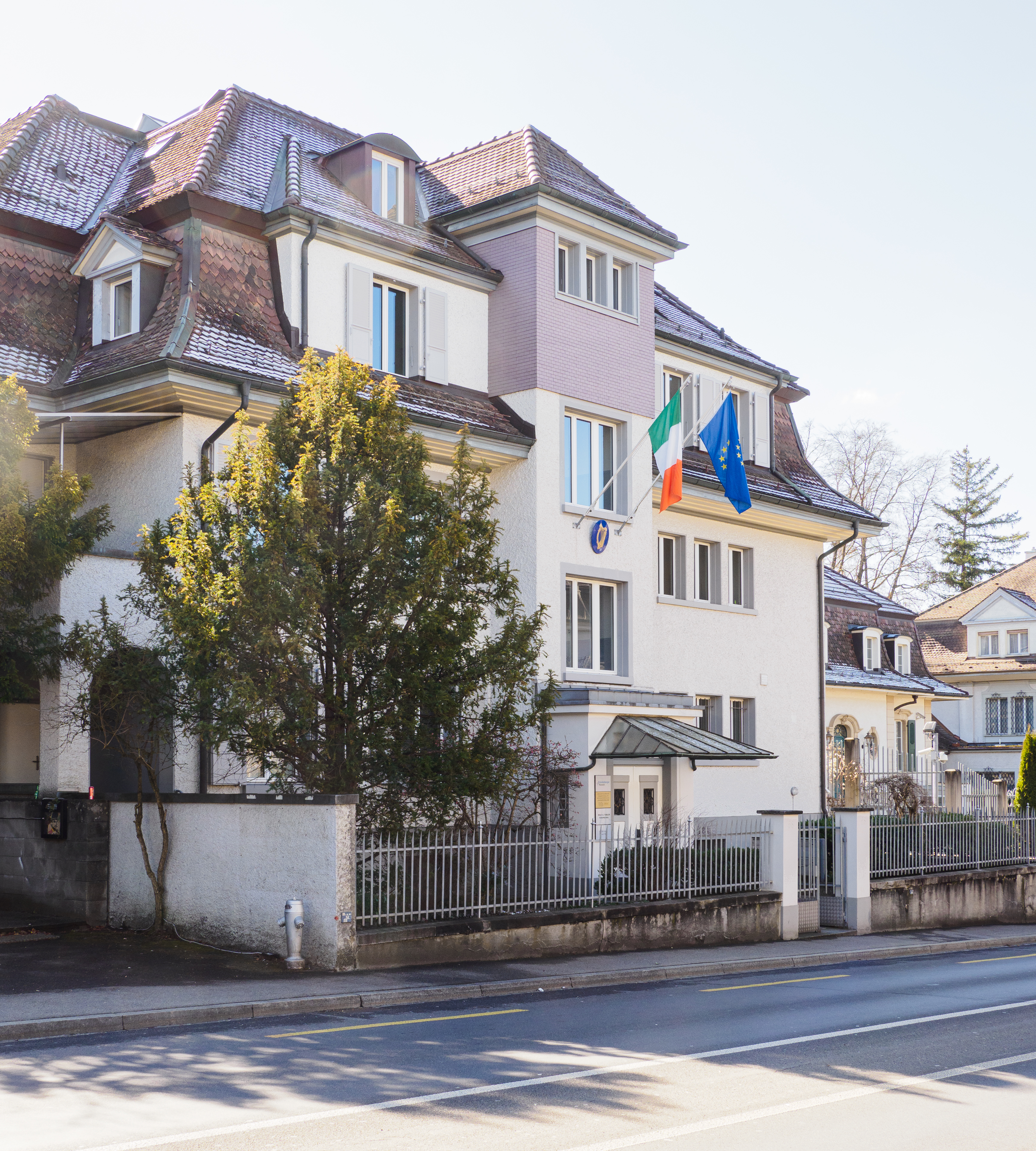
Embassy of Ireland

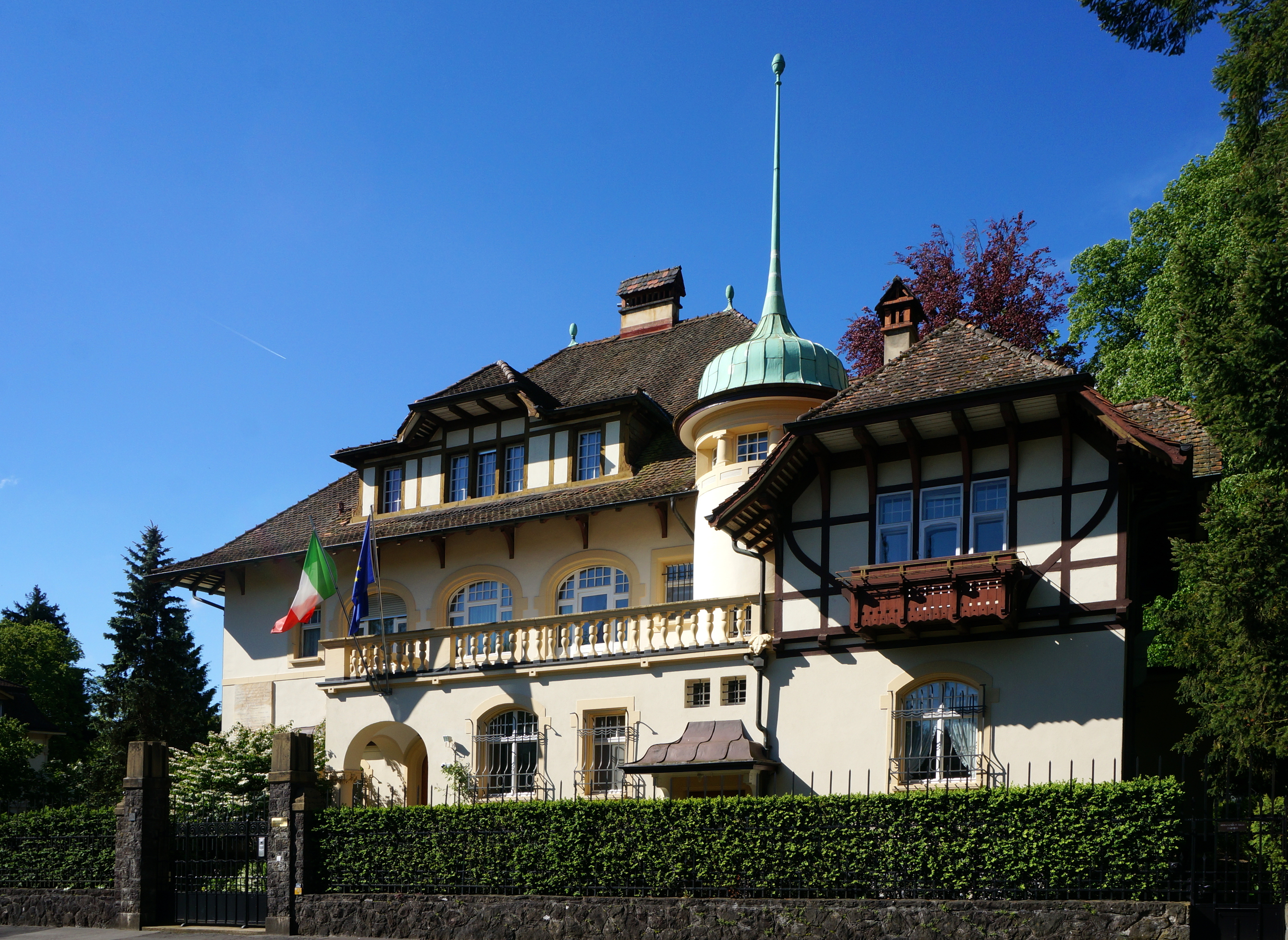
Embassy of Italy

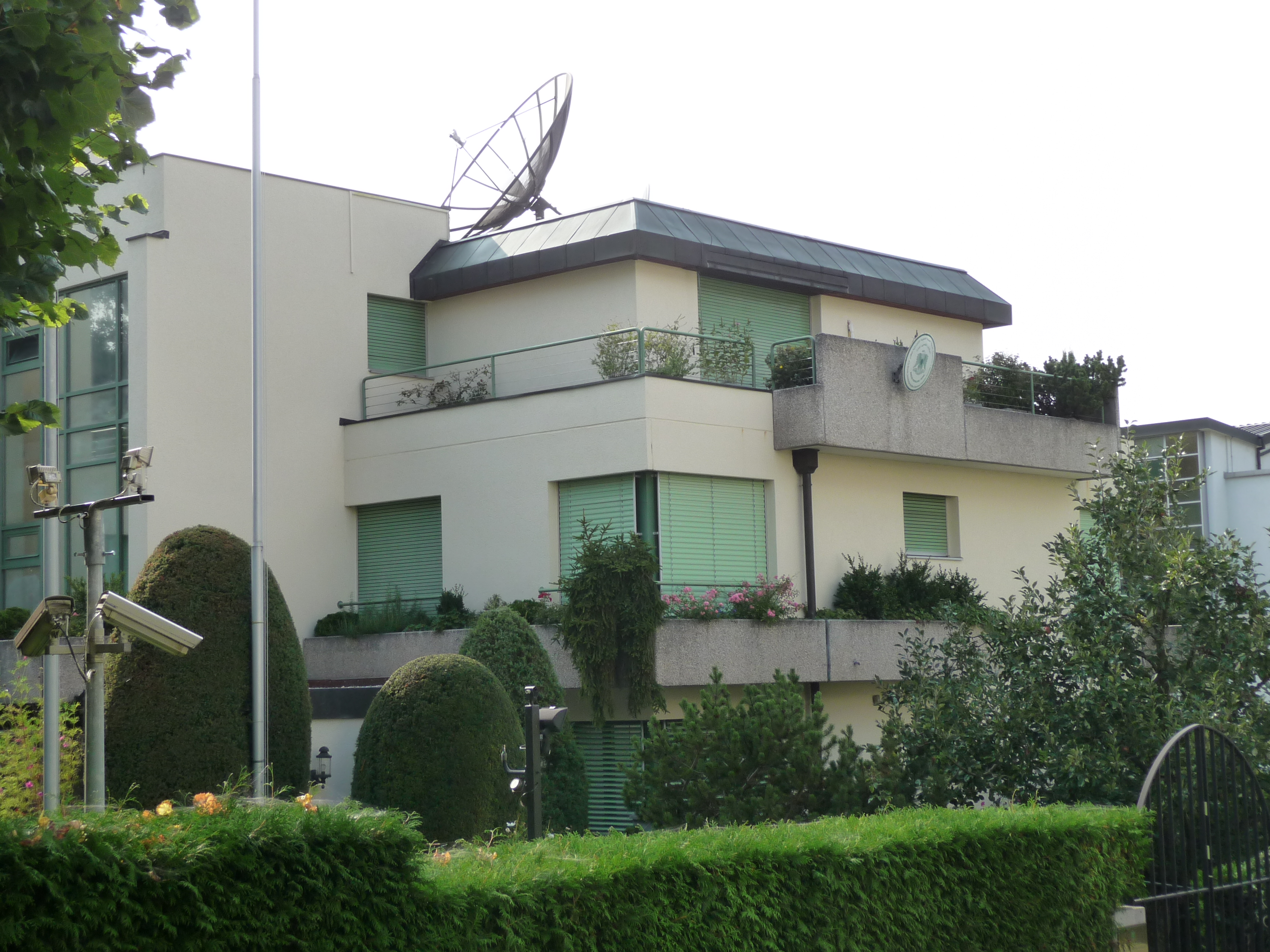
Embassy of Libya

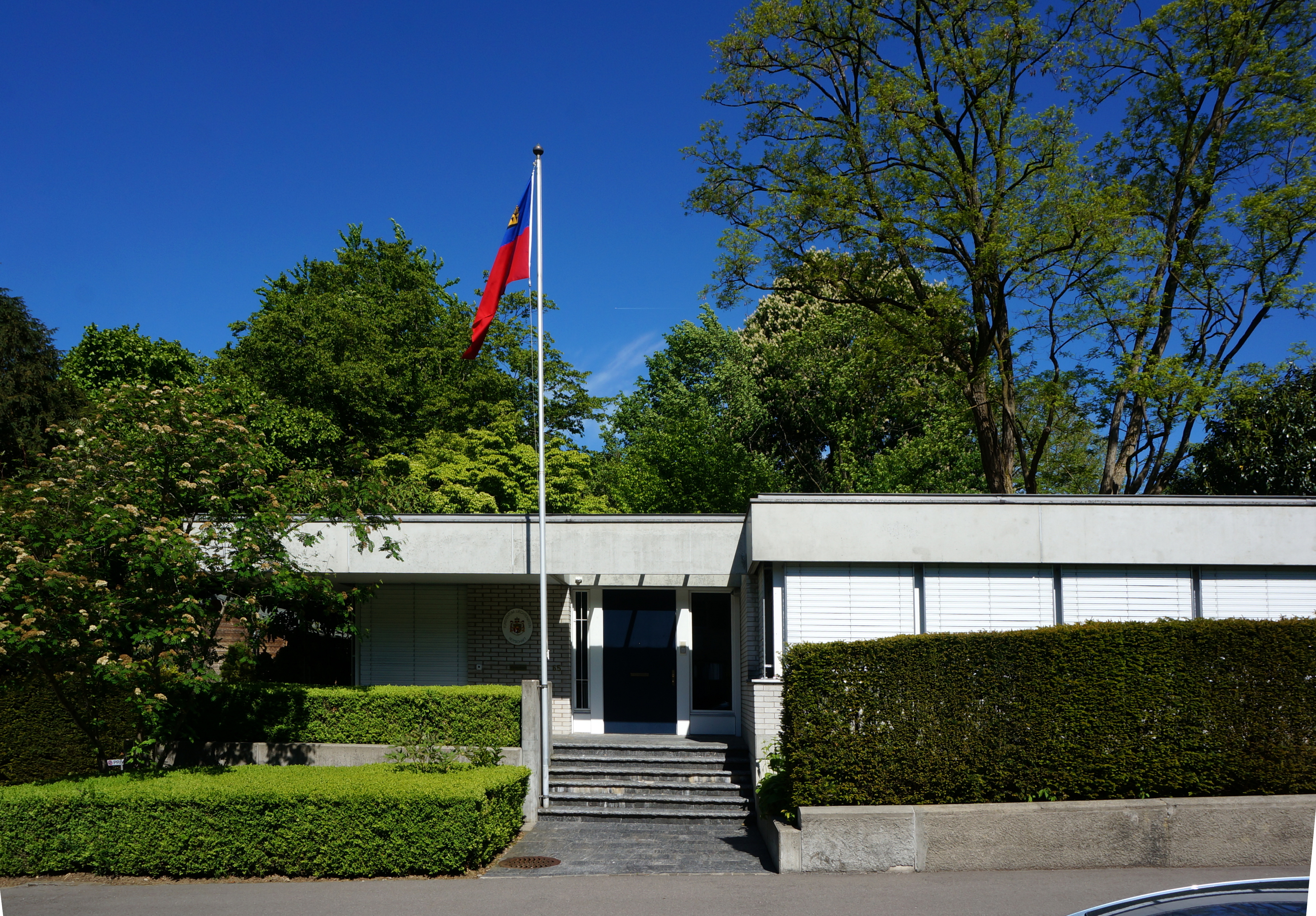
Embassy of Liechtenstein

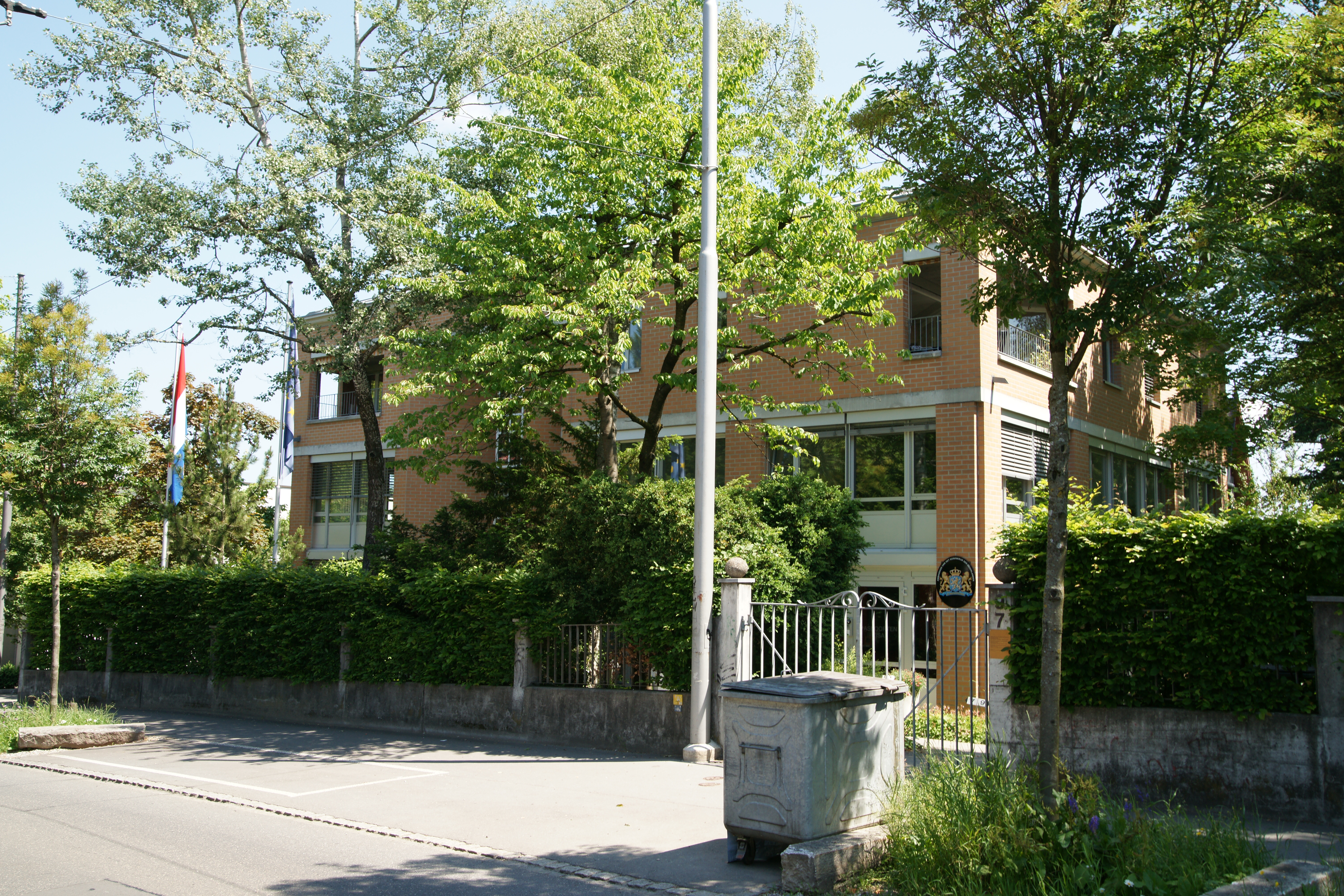
Embassy of the Netherlands

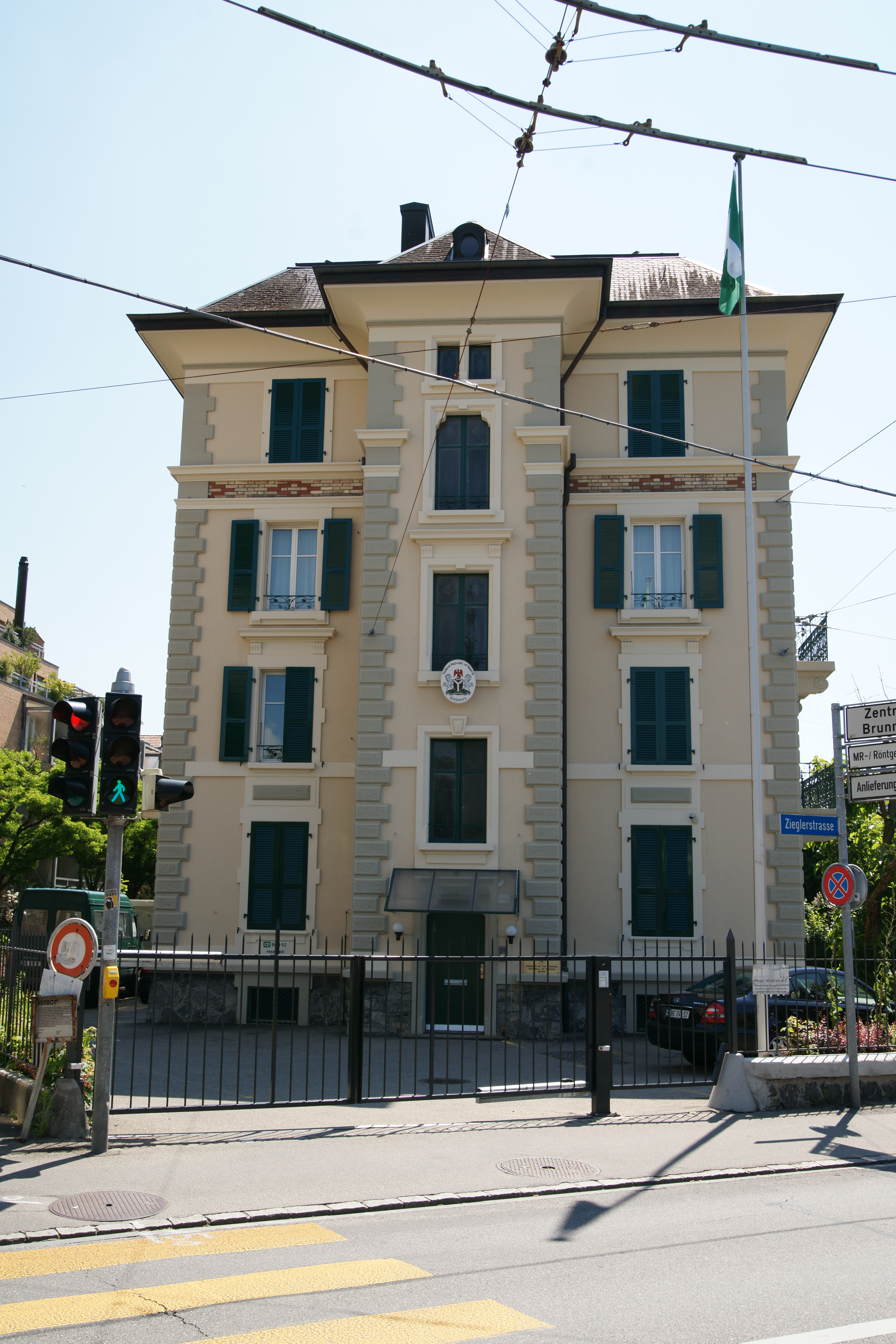
Embassy of Nigeria

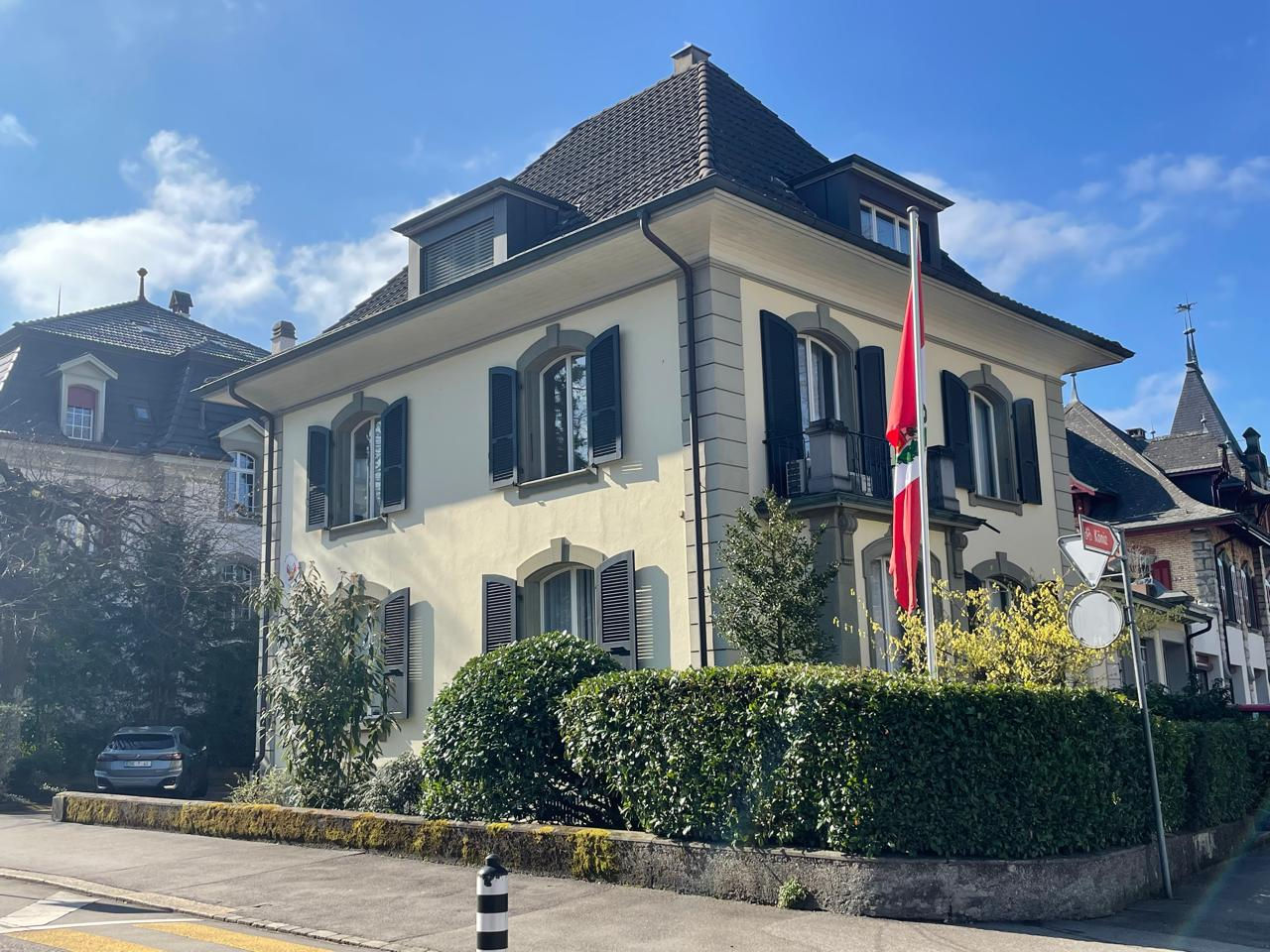
Embassy of Peru

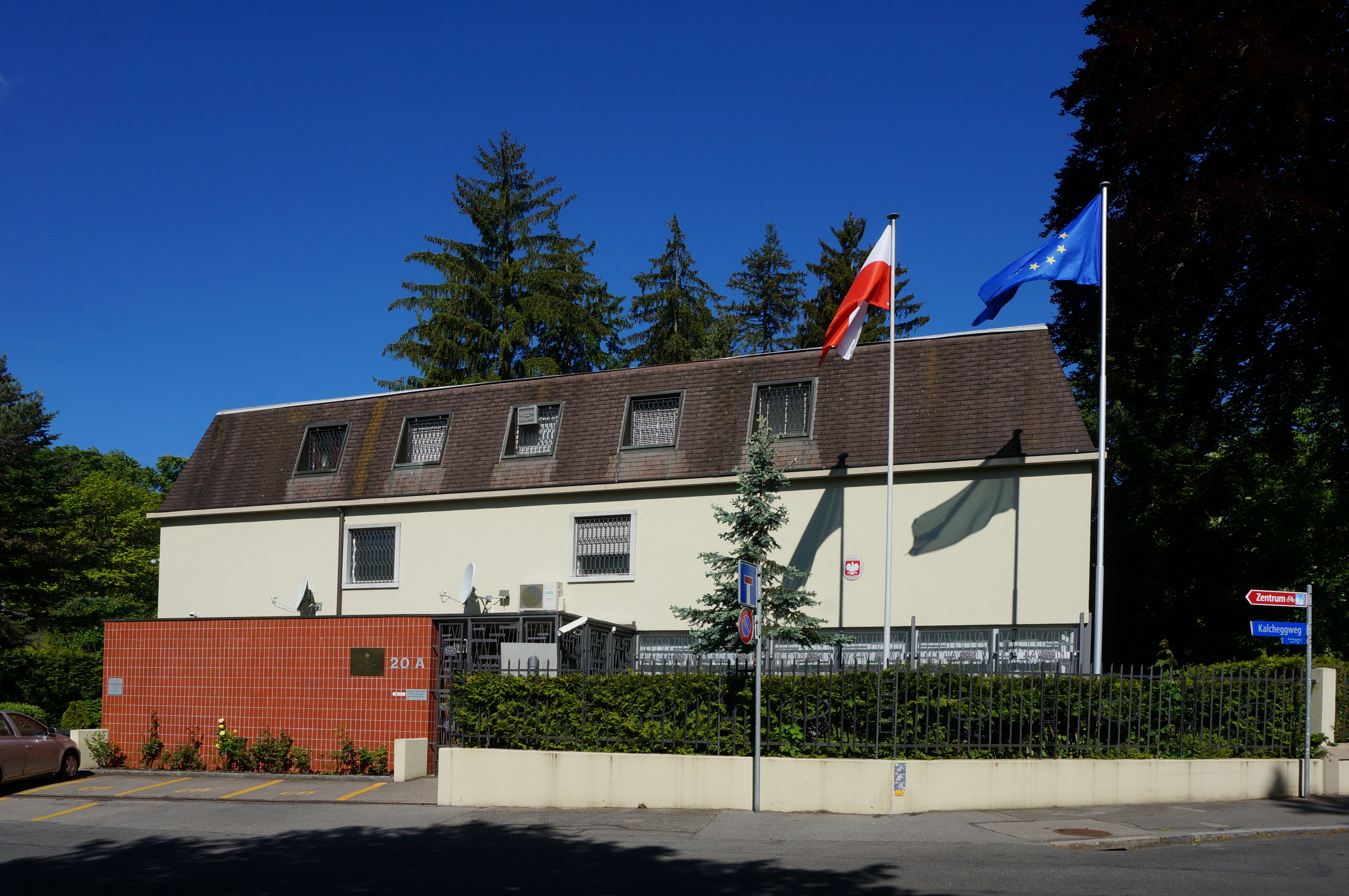
Embassy of Poland

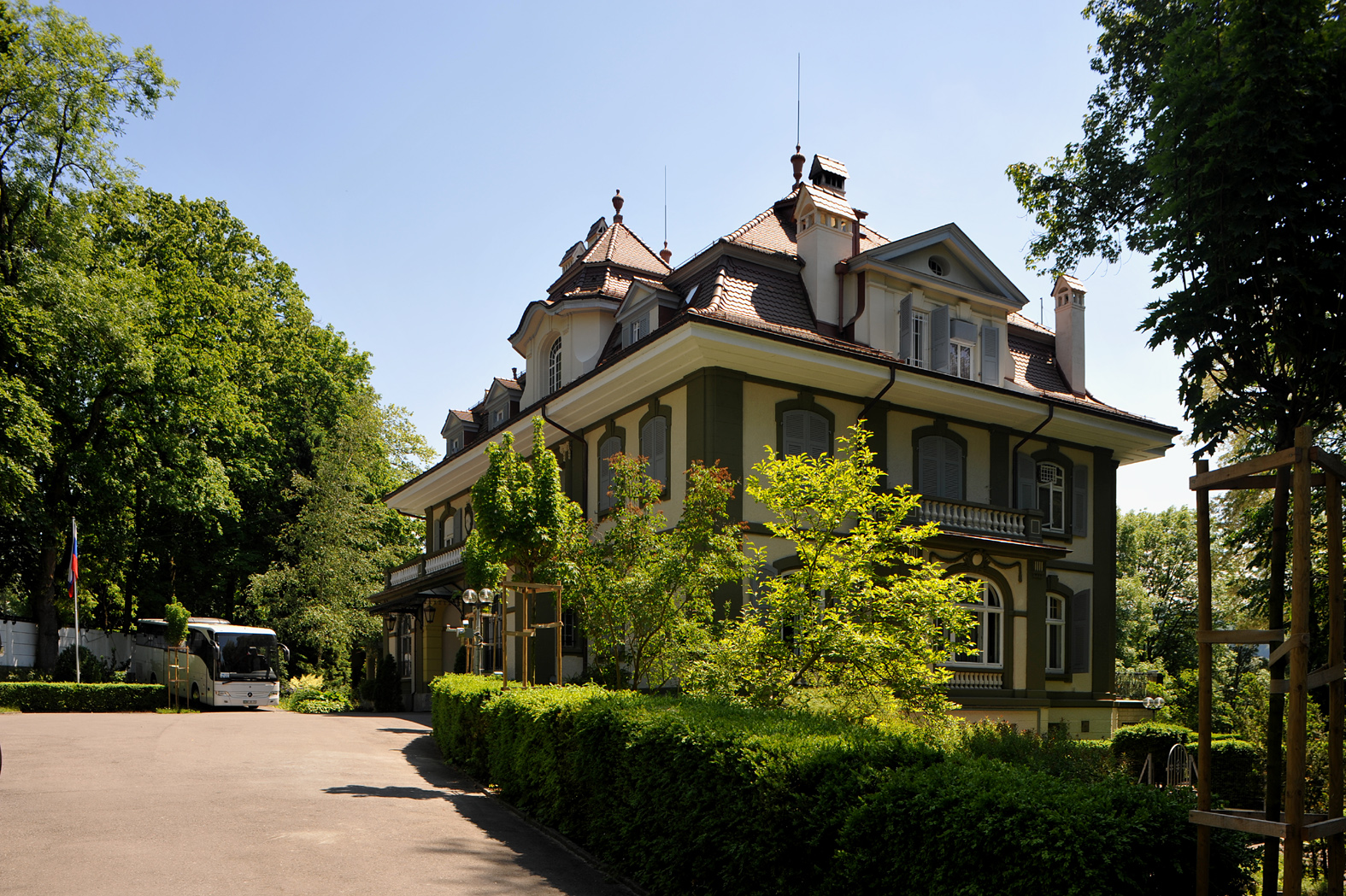
Embassy of Russia

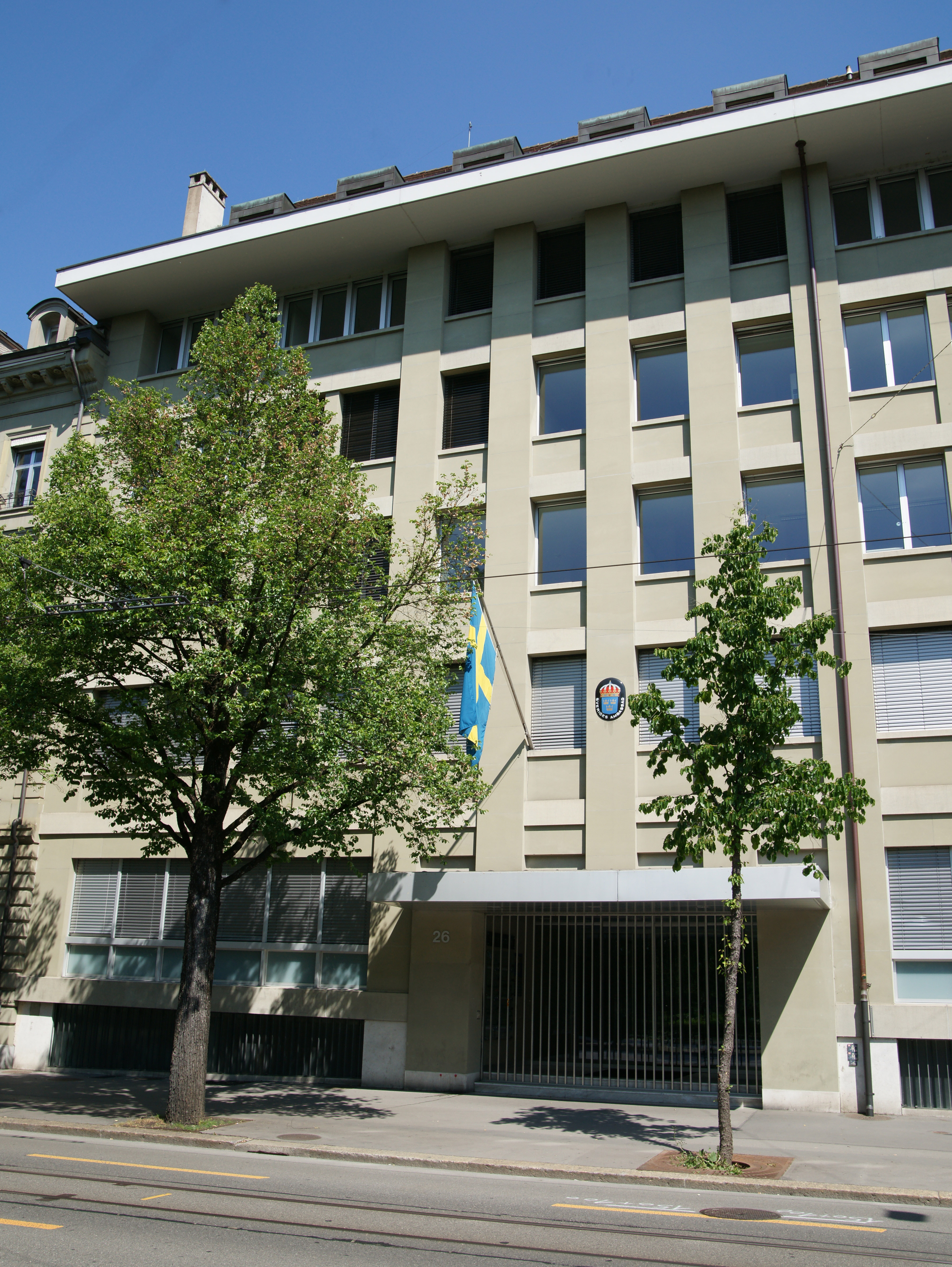
Embassy of Sweden

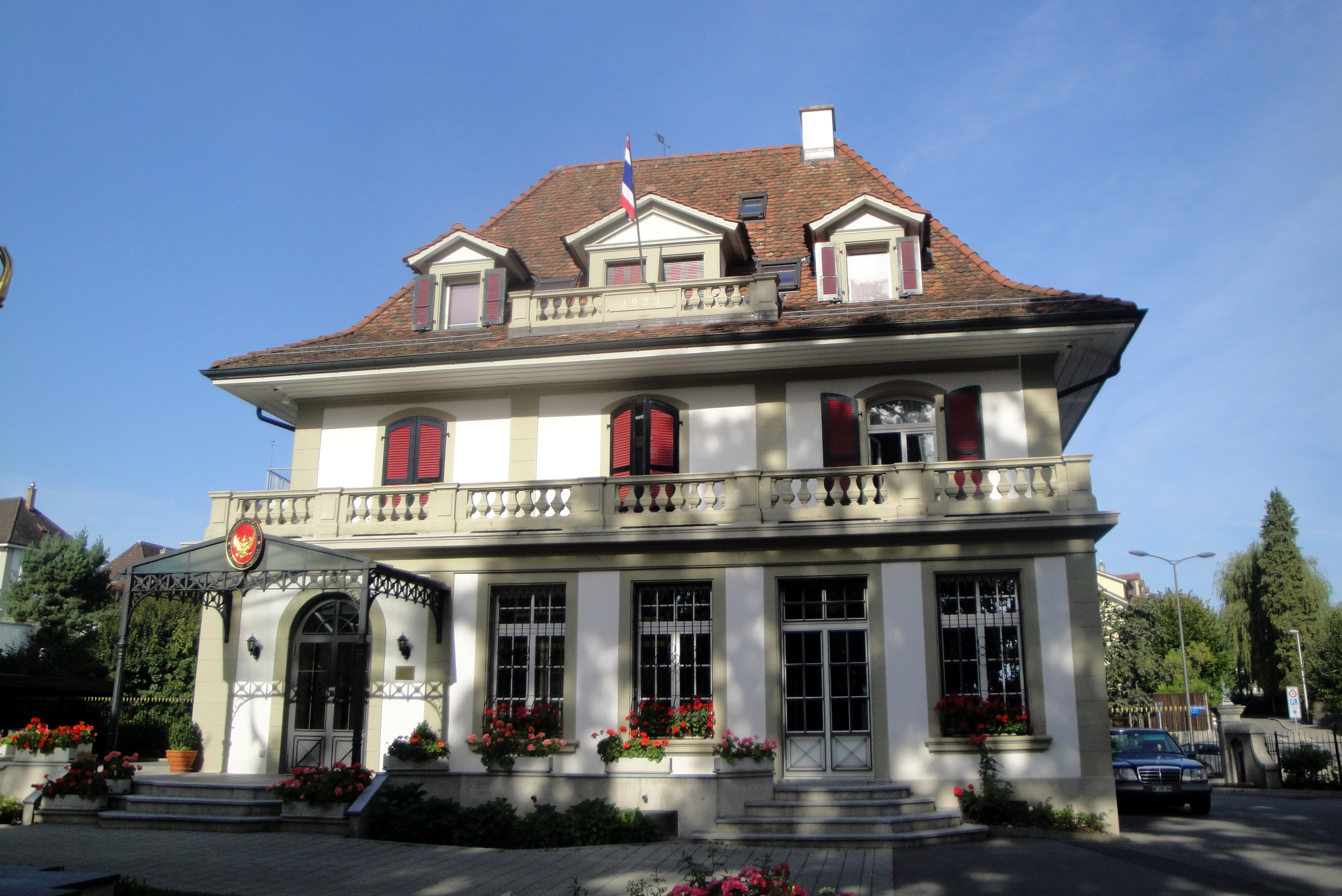
Embassy of Thailand

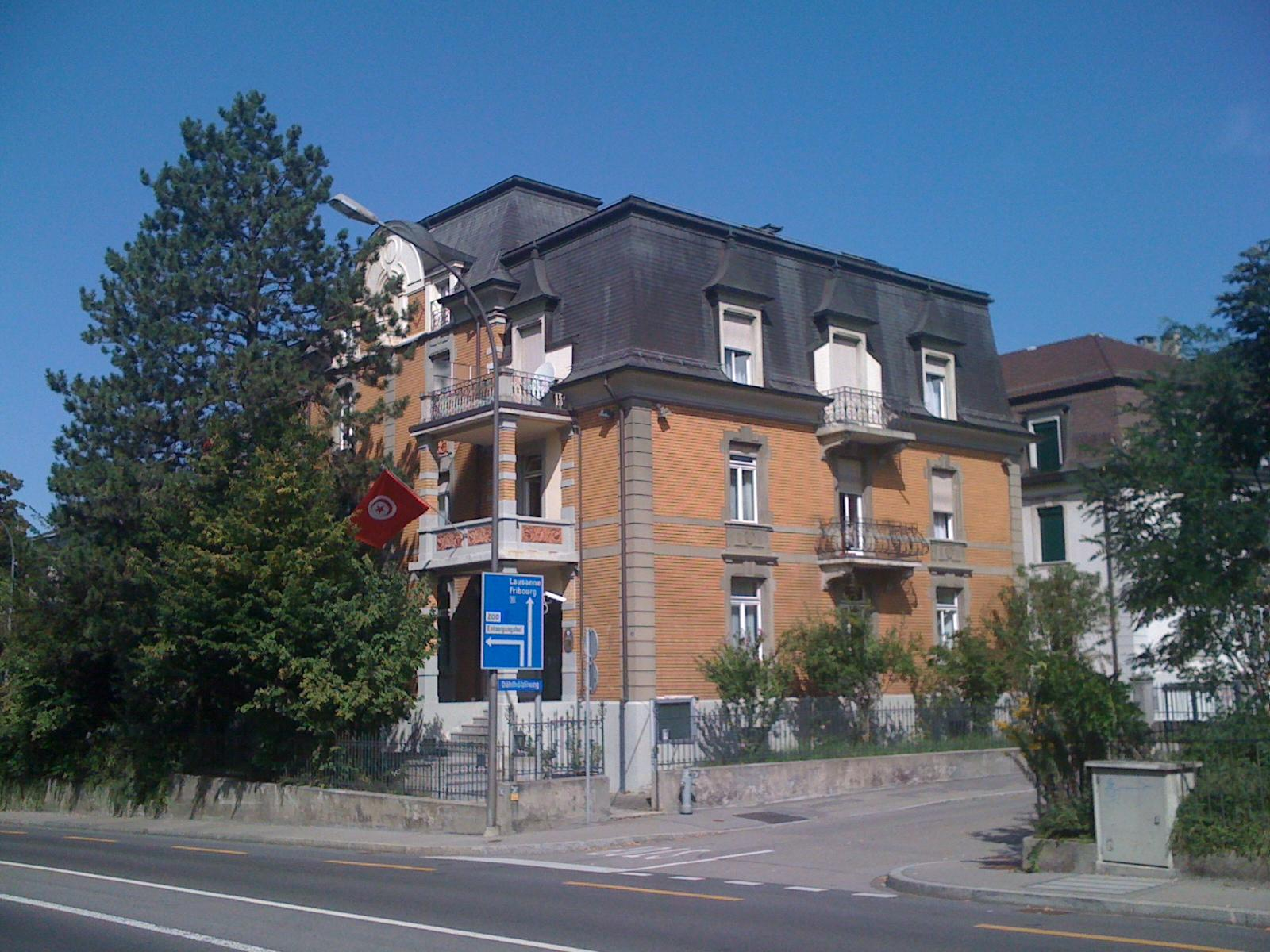
Embassy of Tunisia

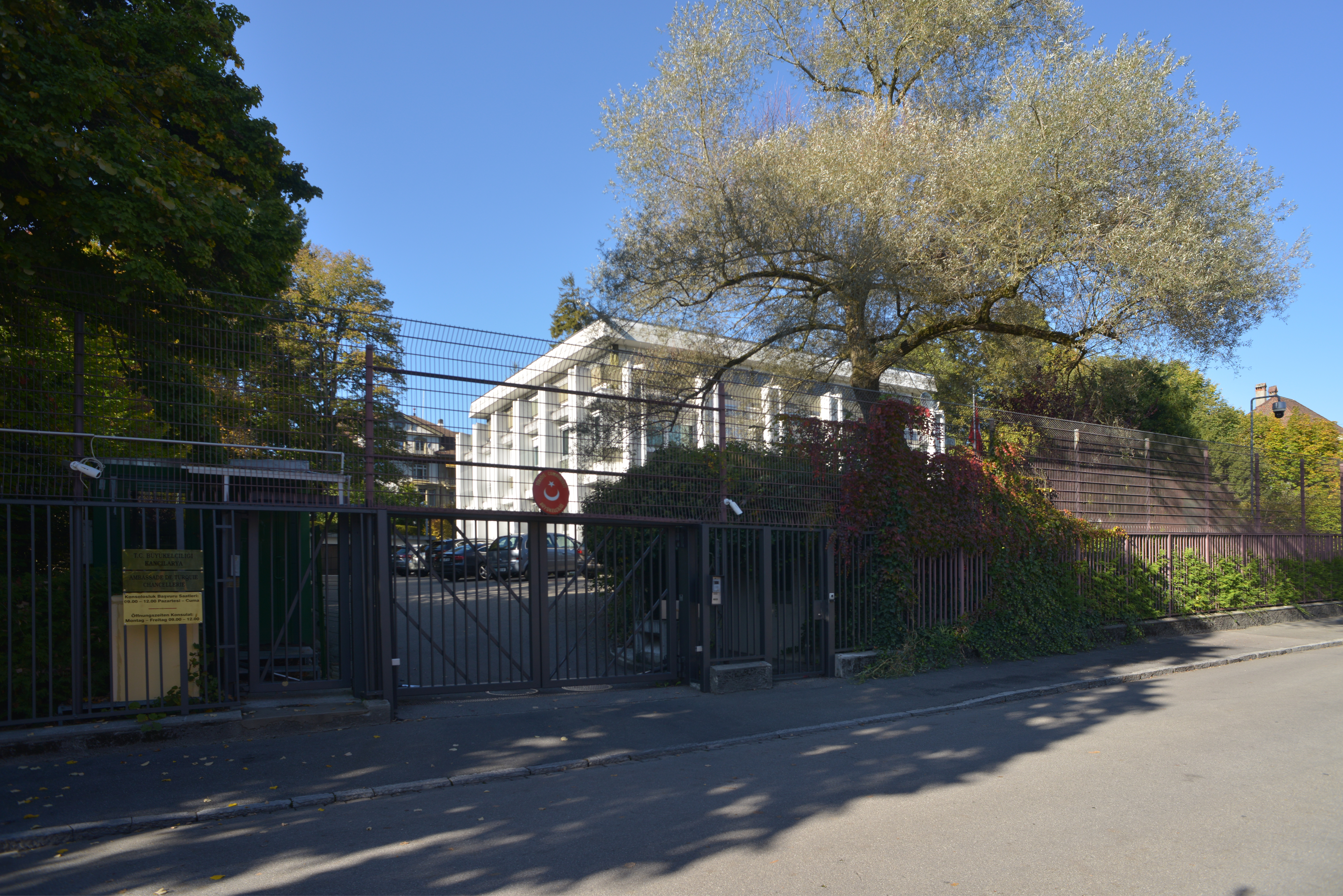
Embassy of Turkey

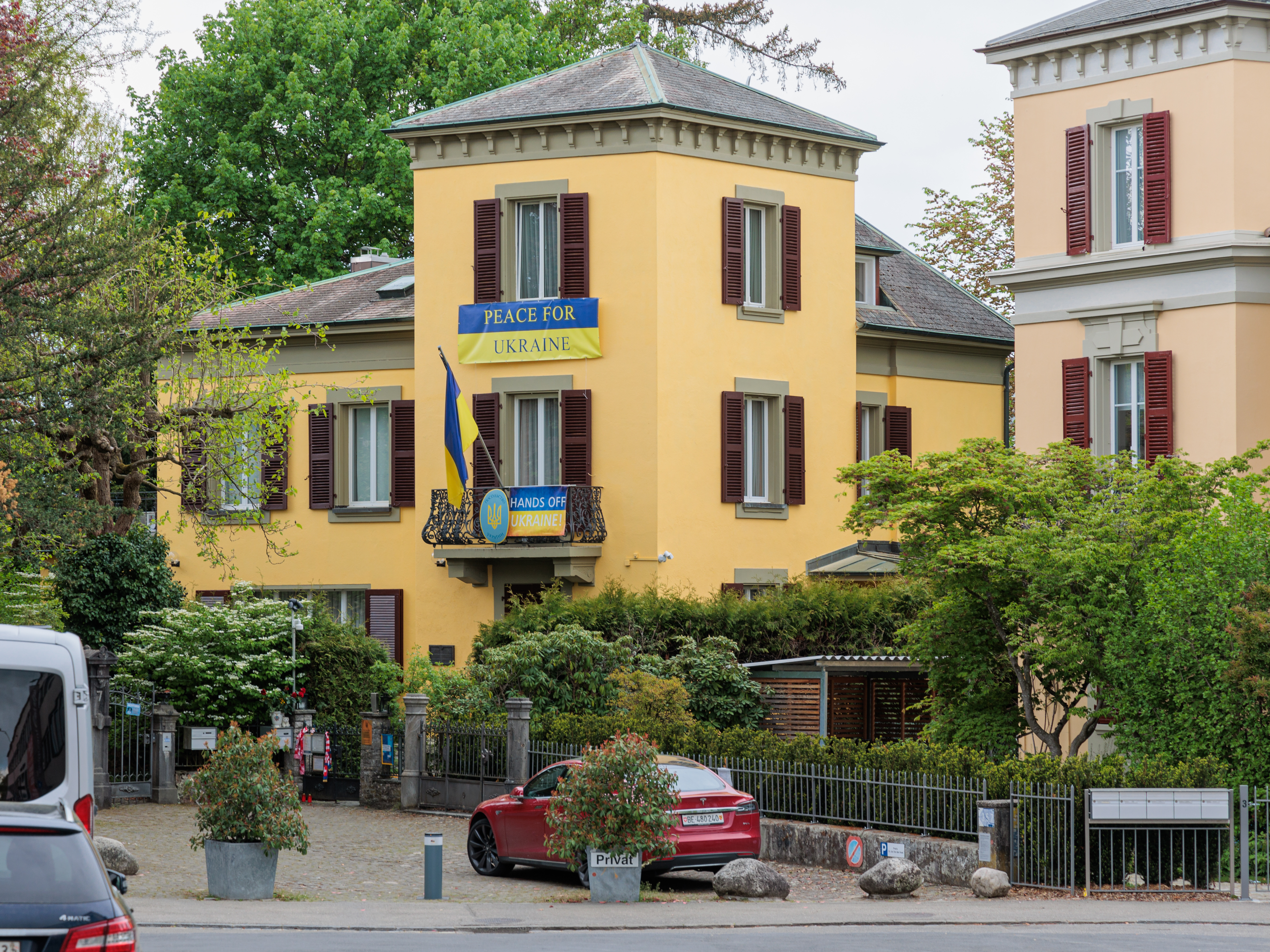
Embassy of Ukraine

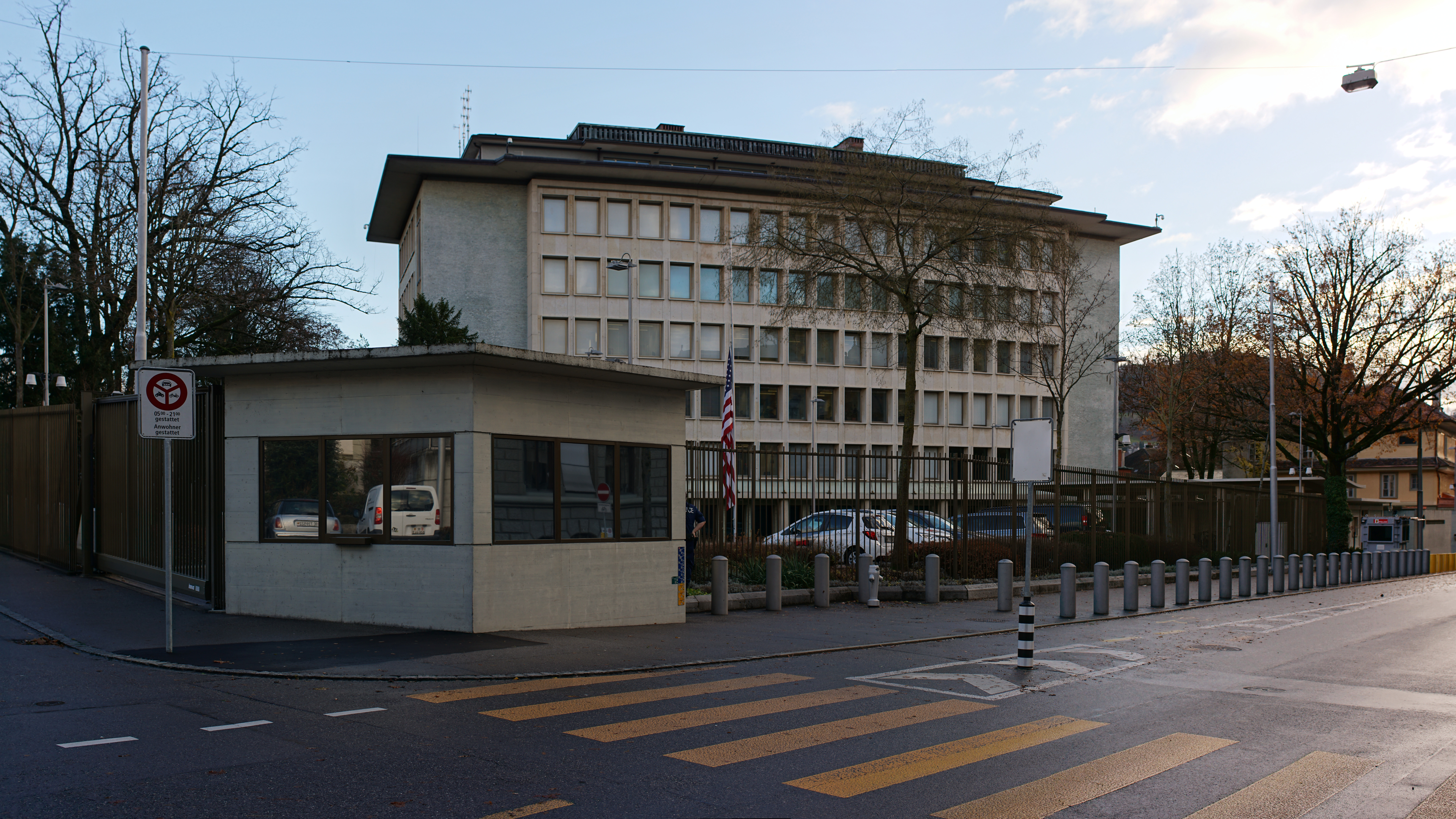
Embassy of the United States

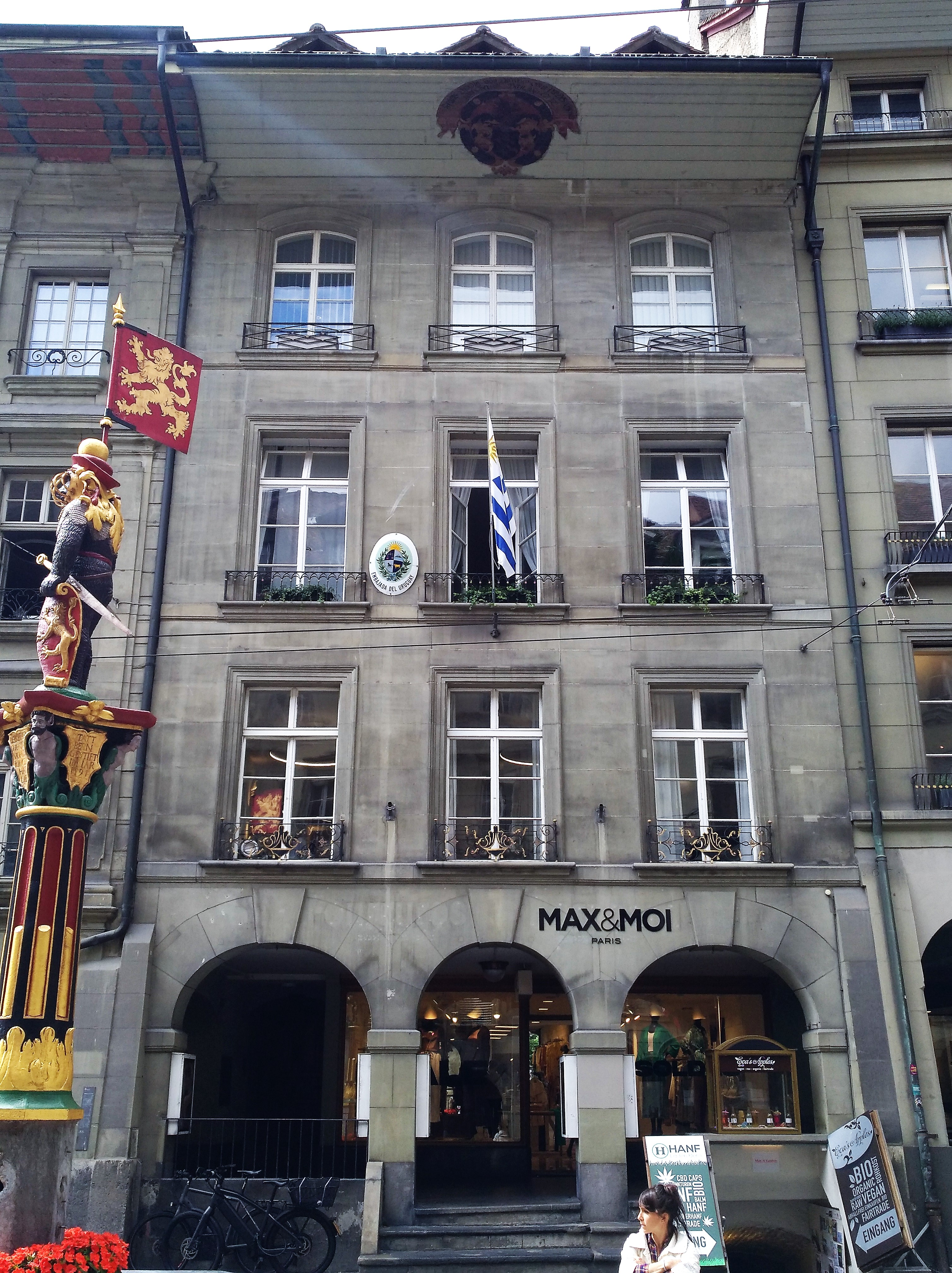
Embassy of Uruguay

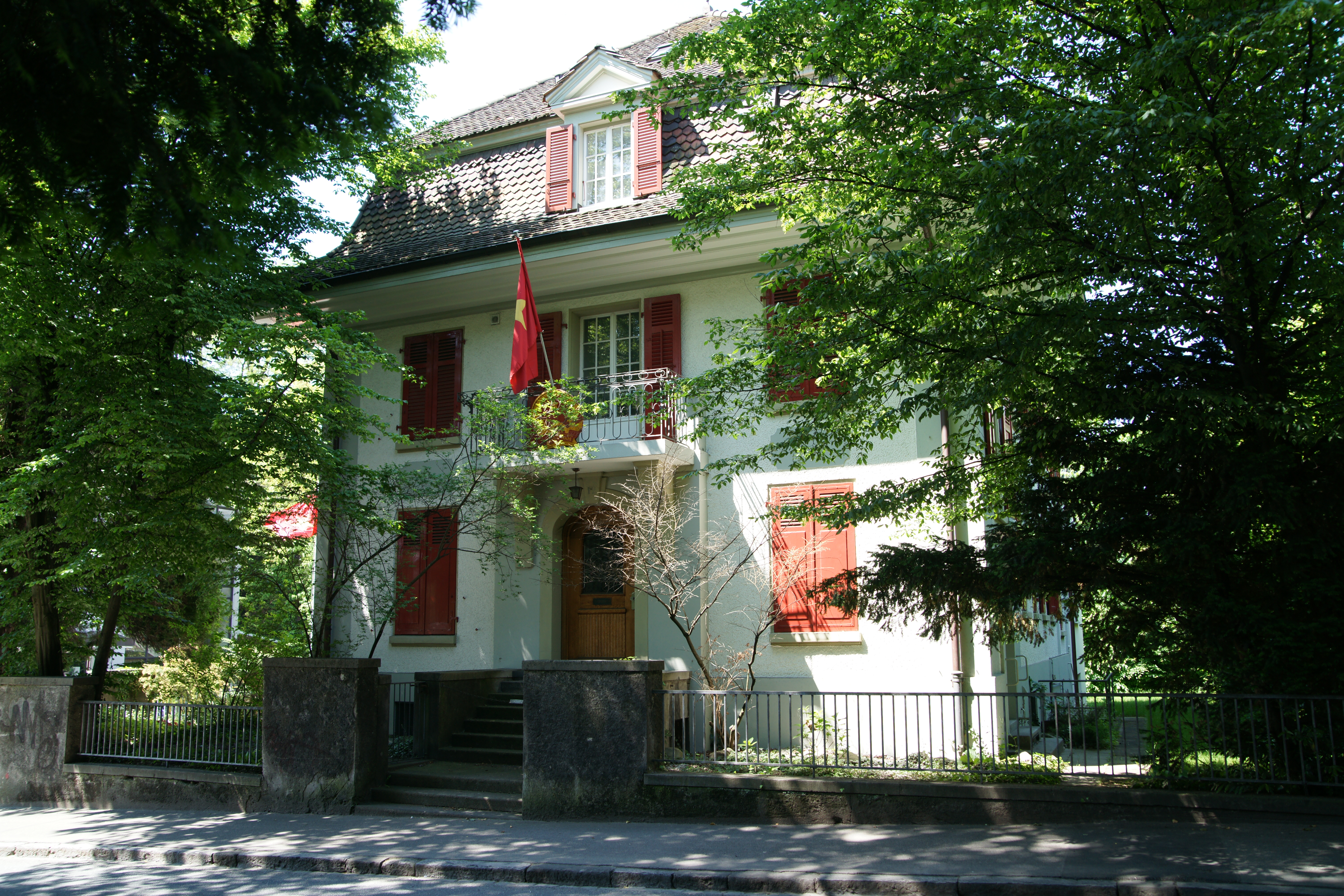
Embassy of Vietnam

== Consulates-General and Consulates ==
The following cities are host to career consular missions; all are consulates-general unless indicated otherwise.

=== Basel ===
1. Italy (Consulate)

=== Geneva ===
1. Algeria
2. Australia
3. Bahrain
4. Bolivia
5. Brazil
6. Brunei
7. France
8. Greece
9. India
10. Italy
11. Japan (Consulate)
12. Kosovo
13. Kuwait
14. Luxembourg
15. New Zealand
16. Peru
17. Philippines
18. Portugal
19. Russia
20. Saudi Arabia
21. Singapore (Singapore)
22. Spain
23. Sri Lanka
24. Syria
25. Taiwan (Economic & Cultural Office)
26. Turkey
27. Vietnam (Consulate)
28. United Arab Emirates
29. United States (Consular agency)

=== Lugano ===
1. Italy
2. Portugal (Consular office)

=== Sion ===
1. Portugal (Consular office)

=== Zürich ===
1. Brazil
2. China
3. Croatia
4. Dominican Republic
5. France
6. Italy
7. Kosovo (Consulate)
8. Portugal
9. Serbia
10. Spain
11. Turkey
12. United States (Consular agency)

== Non-resident embassies accredited to Switzerland ==
=== Resident in Berlin, Germany ===
1. Bolivia
2. Brunei
3. Denmark
4. New Zealand
5. Sri Lanka
6. Tanzania
7. Uzbekistan
8. Zimbabwe

=== Resident in Brussels, Belgium ===
1. Dominica
2. Guinea-Bissau
3. Trinidad and Tobago

=== Resident in Paris, France ===
1. Bahrain
2. Comoros
3. Gabon
4. Guatemala
5. Haiti
6. Liberia
7. Paraguay
8. Syria

=== Resident in other cities ===
1. Andorra (Andorra la Vella)
2. Cyprus (Rome)
3. Estonia (Vienna)
4. Latvia (Vienna)
5. Malta (Valletta)
6. Tonga (London)

== Closed missions ==
Host city	Sending country	Mission level	Year closed	Ref.
Bern	Denmark	Embassy (Note: Resident in Berlin, Germany)	2014	
Bern	Guatemala	Embassy (Note: Resident in Paris, Ile-de-France, France)	2021	
Bern	Paraguay	Embassy	2024	
Bern	Syria	Embassy	1968	
Basel	France	Consulate-General	1996	
Geneva	Belgium	Consulate-General	2015	
Geneva	Lithuania	Consulate	2023	
Geneva	United Kingdom	Consulate-General	2010	
Lausanne	Germany	Consulate-General	2005	
Lausanne	Italy	Consulate-General	2011	
Neuchâtel	Italy	Consular agency	2013	
St. Gallen	Italy	Consulate	2014	
Sion	Italy	Consular agency	2013	
Zürich	Austria	Consulate-General	2011	
Zürich	Peru	Consulate-General	2023	
Zürich	United Kingdom	Consulate-General	1998	
Wettingen	Italy	Consular agency	2013	

== Embassies to open ==
Host city	Sending country	Mission	Ref.
Bern	Papua New Guinea	Embassy	
Bern	Bangladesh	Embassy	

== See also ==
- List of diplomatic missions of Switzerland
- Foreign relations of Switzerland
- Visa requirements for Swiss citizens
