= List of ambassadors of Prussia to Switzerland =

The following is a partial list of Prussian envoys to Switzerland.

== History ==
The Kingdom of Prussia had established an official legation in Switzerland as early as 1805, although their diplomats generally did not have a residence in Switzerland. In the first half of the 19th century, relations with Prussian and Switzerland were conducted via the Canton of Neuchâtel, which joined the Swiss Confederation in 1815 and remained the property of the King of Prussia until 1848. The Neuchâtel crisis was the result of a diplomatic question between the Swiss Confederation and the King of Prussia regarding the rights of the Royal House of Prussia to the Principality of Neuchâtel. The Principality of Neuchâtel was granted to the King of Prussia in 1707, then was ruled by Napoléon Bonaparte after Frederick William III of Prussia was deposed as Prince of Neuchâtel. In 1814, the Principality was again granted to Frederick William, and the following year he agreed to allow the Principality to join the Swiss Confederation (which was an alliance of semi-independent states rather than a single country) while remaining under his rule

== Envoys ==
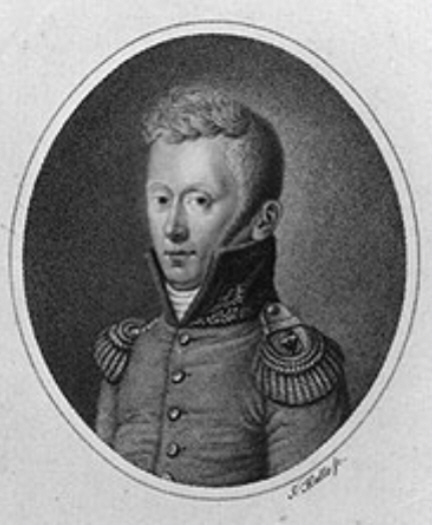
Justus von Gruner

- 1702–1709: Ernst von Metternich (1657–1727), envoy extraordinary to the Confederation.

1792: Establishment of diplomatic relations

- 1792–1795: ?

1795–1805 Interruption of relations

- 1805–1816: Jean Pierre Chambrier d'Oleires (1753–1822)
- 1816–1820: Justus von Gruner (1777–1820)
- 1820–1824: Charles-Gustave de Meuron (1779–1830)
- 1824–1835: Friedrich von Otterstedt (1769–1850)
- 1835–1839: Theodor von Rochow (1794–1854)
- 1839–1841: Christian Karl Josias von Bunsen (1791–1860)
- 1841–1844: Karl von Werther (1809–1894)
- 1845–1847: Friedrich von Wylich and Lottum (1796–1847)
- 1847–1859: Rudolf von Sydow (1805–1872)
- 1859–1867: Karl Ludwig Georg von Kamptz (1808–1870)
- 1867–1882: Heinrich von Roeder (1804–1884)

From 1867: envoy of the North German Confederation, from 1871 envoy of the German Empire.

== See also ==
- Germany–Switzerland relations
- List of ambassadors of Germany to Switzerland
