= List of ambassadors of Germany to Switzerland =

The following is a list of German ambassadors in Switzerland, who is also accredited to Liechtenstein. The seat of the embassy is the German Embassy in Bern.

== Heads of Mission ==
German ambassador in Bern
| Name | Image | Term Start | Term End | Notes |
North German Confederation
| Heinrich von Roeder (1804–1884) | | 1868 | 1870 | From 1867, Prussian ambassador |
/ / / German Empire
| Heinrich von Roeder (1804–1884) | | 1871 | 1882 | |
| Otto von Bülow (1827–1901) | | 1882 | 1892 | |
| Clemens Busch (1834–1895) | | 1892 | 1895 | |
| Wolfram Freiherr von Rotenhan (1845–1912) | | 1896 | 1897 | |
| Alfred von Bülow (1851–1916) | | 1898 | 1912 | |
| Konrad Gisbert Wilhelm von Romberg (1866–1939) | | 1912 | 1919 | |
| Adolf Gustav Müller (1863–1943) | | 1919 | 1933 | |
| Ernst Freiherr von Weizsäcker (1882–1951) | | 1933 | 1937 | |
| Otto Carl Köcher (1884–1945) | | 1937 | 30 April 1945 | Arrested by American forces on 31 July 1945 and held at a prison camp in Ludwigsburg, where he committed suicide on 27 December 1945 |
/ Federal Republic of Germany
| Friedrich Holzapfel (1900–1969) | | 1951 | 1958 | Head of mission until April 1952, then envoy until July 1957 |
| Ernst-Günther Mohr (1904–1991) | | 1958 | 1963 | |
| Wolfgang von Welck (1901–1973) | | 1963 | 1966 | |
| Friedrich Buch (1906–1992) | | 1966 | 1970 | |
| Josef Löns (1910–1974) | | 1970 | 1973 | |
| Jürgen Diesel (1926–1993) | | 1973 | 1977 | |
| Ulrich Lebsanft (1916–2014) | | 1977 | 1981 | |
| Helmut Redies (1927–1998) | | 1981 | 1983 | |
| Gerhard Fischer (1921–2006) | | 1983 | 1985 | |
| Jens Petersen (* 1923) | | 1986 | 1988 | |
| Wolfram Dufner (* 1926) | | 1989 | 1991 | |
| Werner Graf von der Schulenburg (* 1929) | | 1991 | 1994 | |
| Eberhard Heyken (1935–2008) | | 1994 | 1996 | |
| Lothar Wittmann (* 1933) | | 1996 | 1998 | |
| Klaus Bald (1936–2018) | | 1998 | 2001 | |
| Reinhard Hilger (* 1937) | | 2001 | 2003 | |
| Frank Elbe (1941–2022) | | 2003 | 2005 | |
| Andreas von Stechow (1943–2013) | | 2006 | 2008 | |
| Axel Berg (* 1951) | | 2008 | 2011 | |
| Peter Gottwald (* 1948) | | 2011 | 2013 | |
| Otto Lampe (* 1951) | | 2013 | 2017 | |
| Norbert Riedel (* 1960) | | 2017 | 2020 | |
| Michael Flügger (* 1959) | | 2020 | | |

== Envoys of the German States (before 1871) ==
=== Baden envoys ===
1807: Establishment of diplomatic relations

- 1807–1818: Joseph Albrecht von Ittner (1754–1825)
- 1818–1821: Franz Albert von Friedrich (1775–1843)
- 1821–1826: Vacant
- 1826–1838: Alexander von Dusch (1789–1876) (father of Theodor von Dusch)
- 1838–1843: Ludwig Rüdt von Collenberg-Bödigheim (1799–1885) Resident in Stuttgart
- 1843–1851: August Marschall von Bieberstein (1804–1888)
- 1851–1853: Christian Friedrich Gustav von Berckheim (1817–1889)
- 1853–1872: Ferdinand von Dusch (1819–1889) Resident in Stuttgart

1872: Abolition of the embassy

=== Württemberg envoys ===
1807: Establishment of diplomatic relations

- 1807–1812: Johann Baptist Martin von Arand (1743–1821)
- 1812–1814: August Friedrich von Batz (1757–1821)
- 1814–1817: Carl Philipp von Kaufmann (1789–1876)
- 1818–1864: Vacant
- 1865–1867: Carl Hugo von Spitzemberg (1826–1880)
- 1867–1872: Adolf von Ow-Wachendorf (1818–1873)

1873: Abolition of the embassy

== See also ==
- Switzerland–Germany relations
