= Embassy of Germany, Bern =

Embassy of Germany in Bern
- Location: Bern
- Address: Willadingweg 83, 3006
- Opened: 1957
- Ambassador: Michael Flügger

The German Embassy in Bern is the diplomatic representation of the Federal Republic of Germany in the Swiss Confederation and the Principality of Liechtenstein. The embassy is located in Bern's Brunnadern district in the Kirchenfeld-Schosshalde district at Willadingweg 83, 3006 Bern.

== History ==
The Federal Republic of Germany opened a legation in Bern on 6 May 1952, which was converted into an embassy on 22 July 1957.

East Germany and Switzerland established diplomatic relations on 20 December 1972. They opened an embassy in Bern, which was closed in 1990 when East Germany joined the Federal Republic of Germany.

=== Mission and organization ===
The German Embassy in Bern is tasked with maintaining German-Swiss relations, representing German interests to the Swiss government and informing the federal government about developments in Switzerland. The embassy is divided into political, economic and press departments. There is also a military attaché staff.

The embassy's legal and consular department offers all consular services to German citizens and offers help in emergencies. There is also an on-call telephone service. The embassy's consular district covers all of Switzerland and Liechtenstein. The visa office issues Schengen visas for third-country nationals permanently residing in Switzerland.

Honorary consuls of the Federal Republic of Germany are appointed and based in Basel, Geneva, Lugano and Zürich as well as in Balzers in the Principality of Liechtenstein.

=== Buildings ===
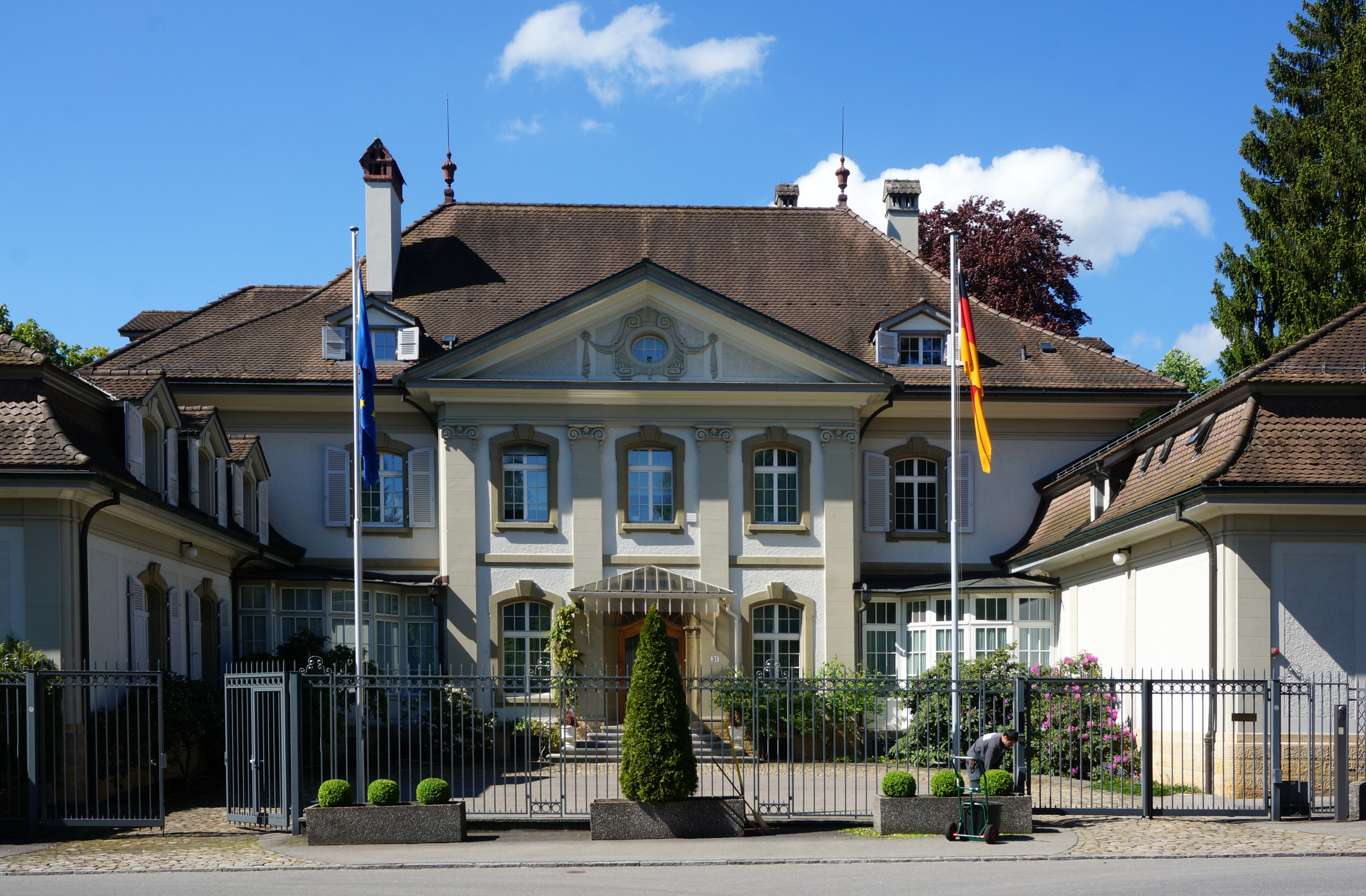
The residence of the German ambassador

The Almanach de Gotha first reported a permanent representative of Prussia in Bern in 1824. This became the North German Confederation in 1868 and the German Empire in 1871. The Bavarian Embassy, located in a villa on Thunplatz built by the architect Henry Berthold von Fischer, was bought by Great Britain before the fall of the Kingdom of Bavarian and replaced by a modern building in 1962.

After being situated in various rental properties, the German Imperial embassy rented Villa Frohberg in Bern's Länggasse district around 1881. In 1901, they acquired the property and renovated it for the mission. Ten years later, however, the building which was more than 200-years-old, was deemed insufficient and the current property in Brunnadern was selected and acquired.

In 1911, Swiss architect Albert Gerster was commissioned by Kaiser Wilhelm II to design a U-shaped structure with a central main wing and wings on both sides, based on baroque country house architecture. The complex was completed by November 1913. The residence was renovated between 2001 and 2003.

By 1926, the office wing of the residence no longer met the embassy's space requirements, and it was decided to build a separate office building on a plot of land across the street. The office, which is set back from the street so as not to impair the perspective view of the residence, was designed by the Bernese architect Hans Klauser in the neo-baroque style and was built the subsequent year. Today, the building houses the German consulate and was modernized and expanded between 2014 and 2015.

By 1942, the office building was again deemed too small and a third, slightly larger building was built opposite it by 1943 (since an extension to the existing office was rejected for reasons of symmetry). During World War II, the headquarters of the German Abwehr (the military-intelligence service of the Wehrmacht) was located in the embassy building.

== See also ==
- List of ambassadors of Germany to Switzerland
