= Betschwanden =

- Village (and former municipality)
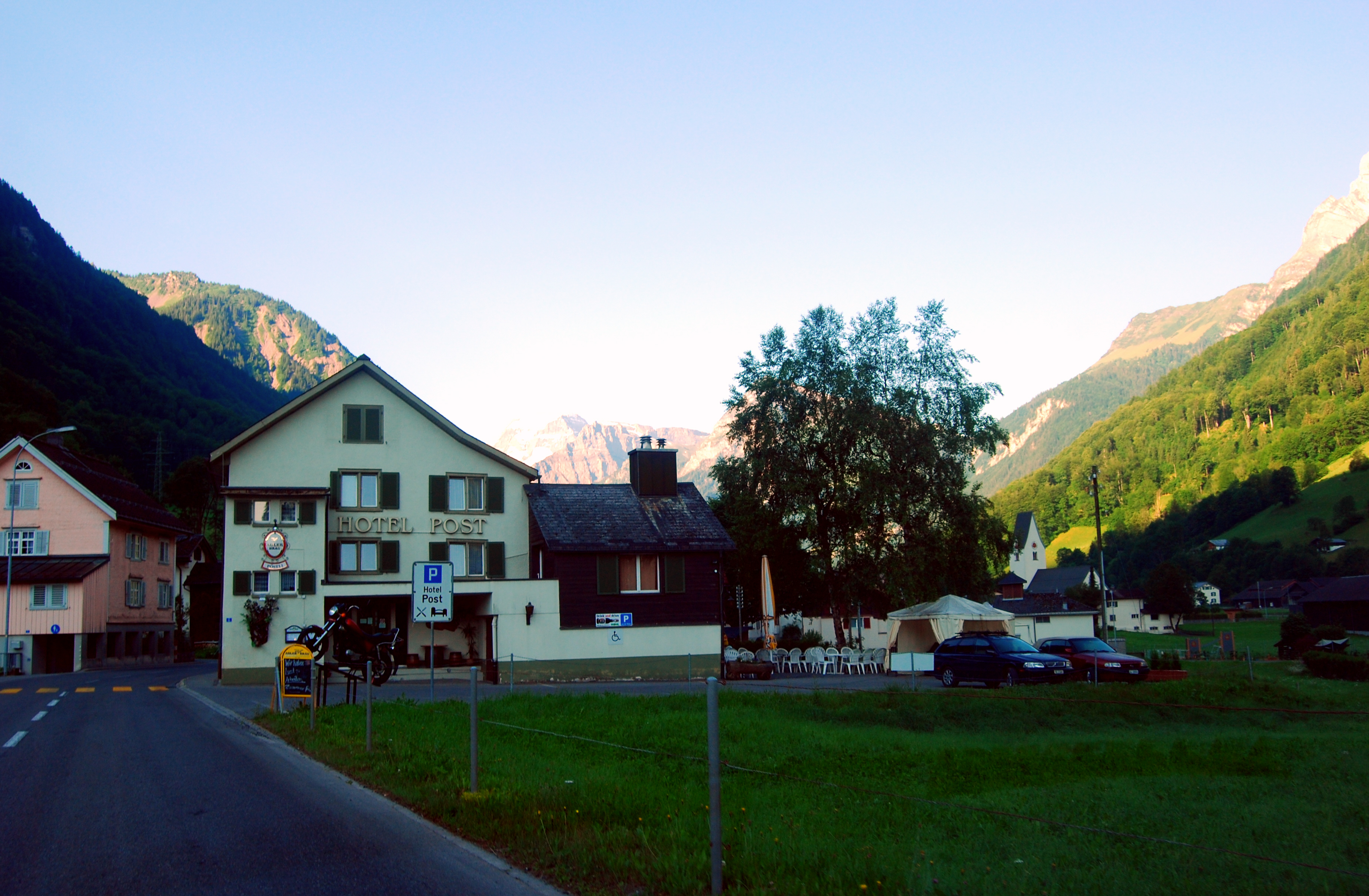

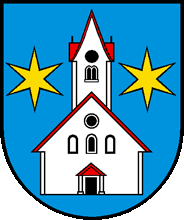
- Coat of arms

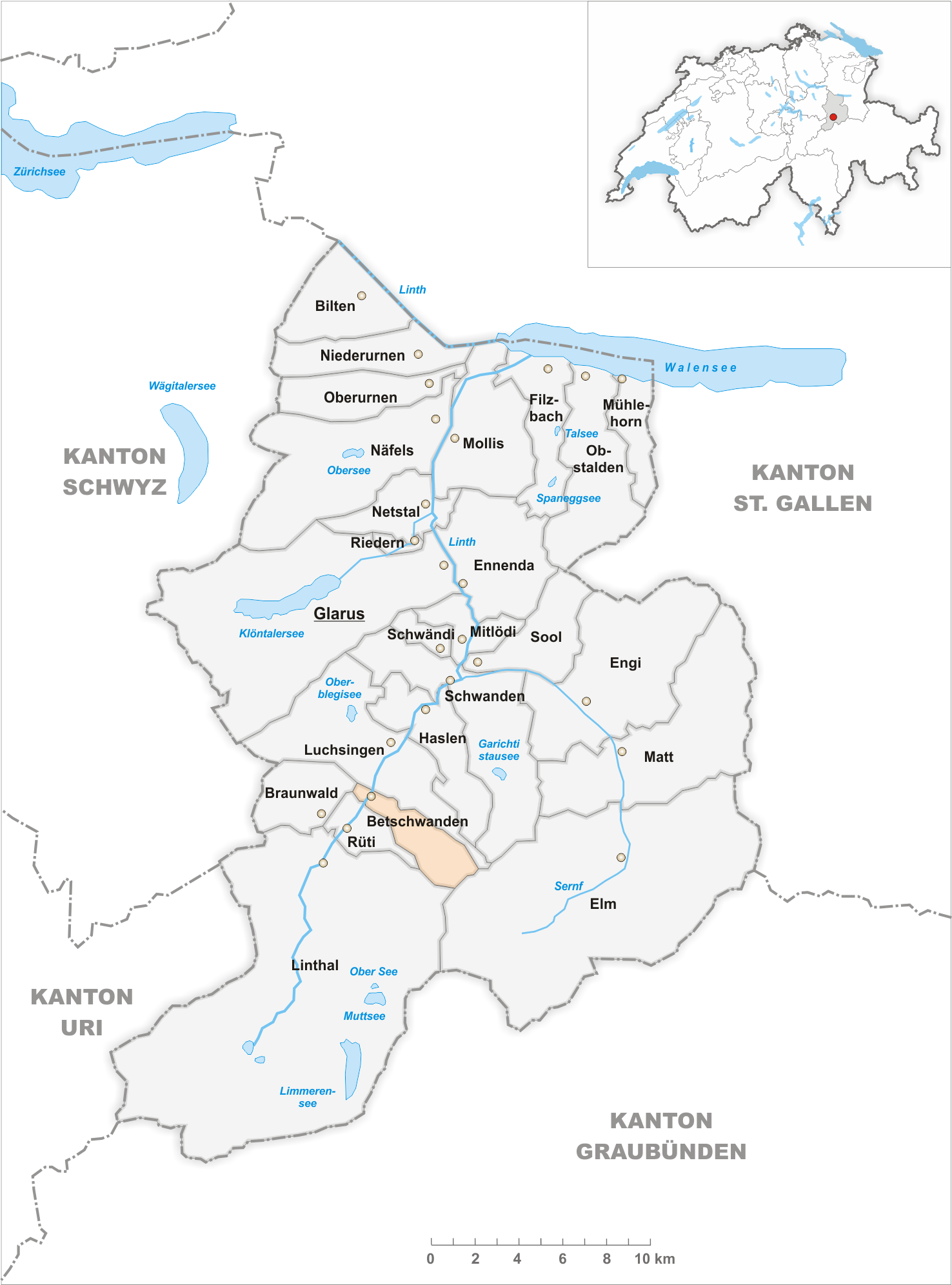
- The former municipal area (2007)
- Coordinates: 46°57′4″N 9°01′53″E
- Country: Switzerland
- Canton: Glarus
- Municipality: Glarus Süd

Area
  - Total: 9.74 km^{2} (3.76 sq mi)
- Elevation: 600 m (2,000 ft)

Population (December 2010)
  - Total: 182
  - Density: 18.7/km^{2} (48.4/sq mi)

Betschwanden is a village and former municipality in the municipality of Glarus Süd and canton of Glarus in Switzerland.

== History ==
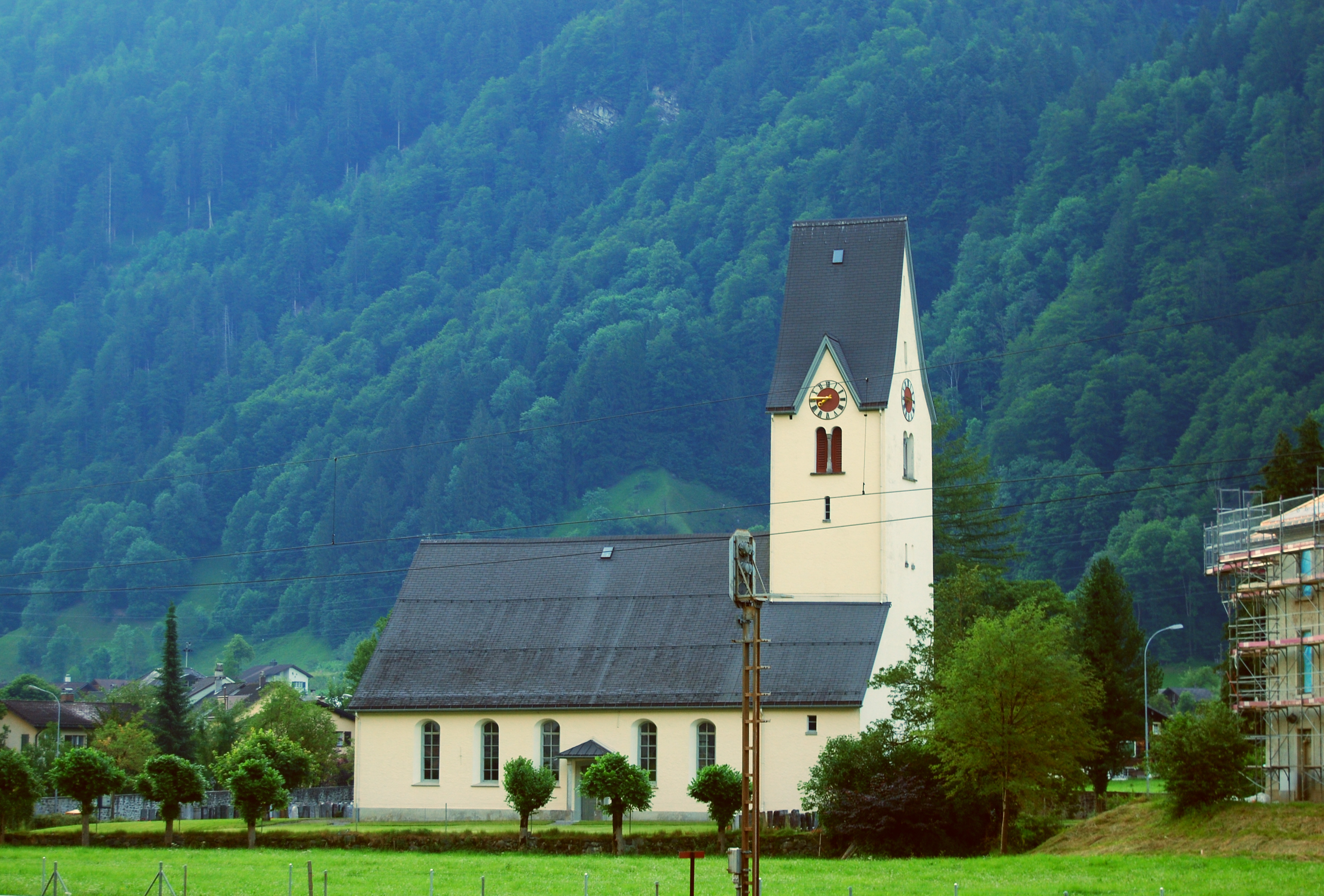
Church of Betschwanden

Betschwanden is first recorded in 1240 in the phrase in Beswando.

Until 1395, Betschwanden was obliged to pay tithes and taxes to Säckingen Abbey. At the same time it was part of the parish of Glarus. The village church was built in the Romanesque style in the 14th century. It was rebuilt several times and flood control walls were added in 1779-80. The Art Nouveau and Gothic Revival elements were added in 1915 and restored in 1975-77. The exterior of the church was rebuilt in 2001.

When the Protestant Reformation arrived in Glarus, Betschwanden adopted the new faith. In 1528 it joined a Reformed parish with Braunwald, Hätzingen, Diesbach and Rüti. In 1942 Braunwald separated to form an independent parish.

Until the 19th century, alpine farming and herding was the primary source of income. A mill was built on the Diesbach river in 1778. Today it is a guest house for the rectory. A parish school opened in 1727. A secondary school opened in 1844. A spinning mill opened in 1843 and a warehouse was added in 1910; it is now a textile chemical factory. A station of the Schweizerische Nordostbahn (Swiss North-East Railway) opened in the village in 1879.

On 1 January 2011, the municipality of Betschwanden was merged into the new municipality of Glarus Süd.

== Geography ==
Betschwanden is located in the valley of the Linth river, with the village situated on the east bank of the river, at an elevation of approximately 600 m (2,000 ft). The village of Rüti lies to the south and Diesbach to the north. Above the village to the east is the mountain of Kärpf (2,794 m or 9,167 ft).

Betschwanden has an area, as defined by the former municipal boundaries in 2006, of 9.7 km^{2} (3.7 sq mi). Of this area, 36% is used for agricultural purposes, while 29.8% is forested. Of the rest of the land, 1.1% is settled (buildings or roads) and the remainder (33.1%) is non-productive (rivers, glaciers or mountains).

== Transport ==
Betschwanden is located on the Hauptstrasse 17, which runs the length of the canton of Glarus before climbing the Klausen Pass into the canton of Uri, as well as on the Weesen to Linthal railway line that parallels the main road and the Linth river through Glarus. The high alpine Klausen Pass is normally only open to traffic between June and September, and for the rest of the year the road and railway up the valley form the only access to the village. The village is served by Diesbach-Betschwanden railway station, which is served by the hourly Zürich S-Bahn service S25 between Linthal and Zürich.

== Demographics ==
Betschwanden has a population, as of 2010 and as defined by the former municipal area, of 182. As of 2007, 6.8% of the population was made up of foreign nationals. Over the last 10 years the population has grown at a rate of 9.1%. Most of the population (as of 2000) speaks German (93.0%), with Finnish being the only other language listed in the census (0.6%).

In the 2007 federal election the most popular party was the SVP which received 50.7% of the vote. Most of the rest of the votes went to the SPS with 47.9% of the vote.

The entire Swiss population is generally well educated. In Betschwanden about 72.7% of the population (between age 25-64) have completed either non-mandatory upper secondary education or additional higher education (either University or a Fachhochschule).

Betschwanden has an unemployment rate of 4.8%. As of 2005, there were 5 people employed in the primary economic sector and about 2 businesses involved in this sector. No one is employed in the secondary sector and there are no businesses in this sector. 19 people are employed in the tertiary sector, with 7 businesses in this sector.

The historical population is given in the following table:

| year | population |
|---|---|
| 1692 | 123 |
| 1850 | 254 |
| 1900 | 255 |
| 1950 | 282 |
| 1980 | 132 |
| 2000 | 172 |
