= Glarus Süd =

- Municipality
- Flag Coat of arms
- Location of Glarus Süd
- Location within Switzerland Location within Canton of Glarus
- Coordinates: 47°00′N 9°04′E
- Country: Switzerland
- Canton: Glarus
- District: n.a.

Area
  - Total: 425.88 km^{2} (164.43 sq mi)
- Elevation: 521 m (1,709 ft)

Population (2009)
  - Total: 9,880
  - Density: 23.2/km^{2} (60.1/sq mi)
- Time zone: UTC+01:00 (CET)
  - Summer (DST): UTC+02:00 (CEST)
- Postal code: 8762
- SFOS number: 1631
- ISO 3166 code: CH-GL
- Localities: Betschwanden, Braunwald, Diesbach, Elm, Engi, Haslen, Hätzingen, Leuggelbach, Linthal, Luchsingen, Matt, Mitlödi, Nidfurn, Rüti, Schwanden, Schwändi, Sool.
- Surrounded by: Glarus, Glarus Nord, Quarten (SG), Flums (SG), Mels (SG), Pfäfers (SG), Flims (GR), Laax (GR), Ilanz/Glion (GR), Andiast (GR), Waltensburg/Vuorz (GR), Breil/Brigels (GR), Trun (GR), Sumvitg (GR), Disentis/Mustér (GR), Silenen (UR), Spiringen (UR), Muotathal (SZ)
- Website: www.glarus-sued.ch

Glarus Süd is a municipality in the Swiss canton of Glarus. It comprises the upper Linth valley, and the entire Sernf valley, and includes the villages of Betschwanden, Braunwald, Diesbach, Elm, Engi, Haslen, Hätzingen, Leuggelbach, Linthal, Luchsingen, Matt, Mitlödi, Nidfurn, Rüti, Schwanden, Schwändi and Sool.

Glarus Süd is one of three municipalities of the canton of Glarus, the others being Glarus and Glarus Nord.

== History ==
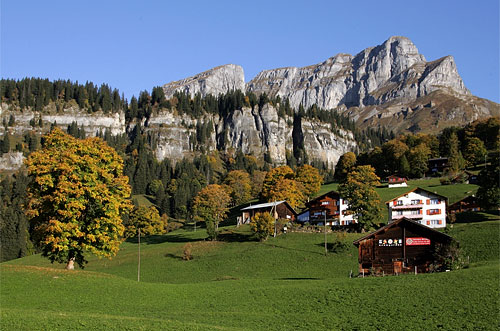
Hüttenberg and Eggstock near Braunwald

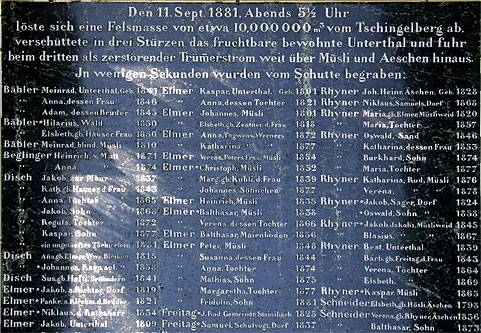
Monument to the dead in Elm in the 1881 avalanche

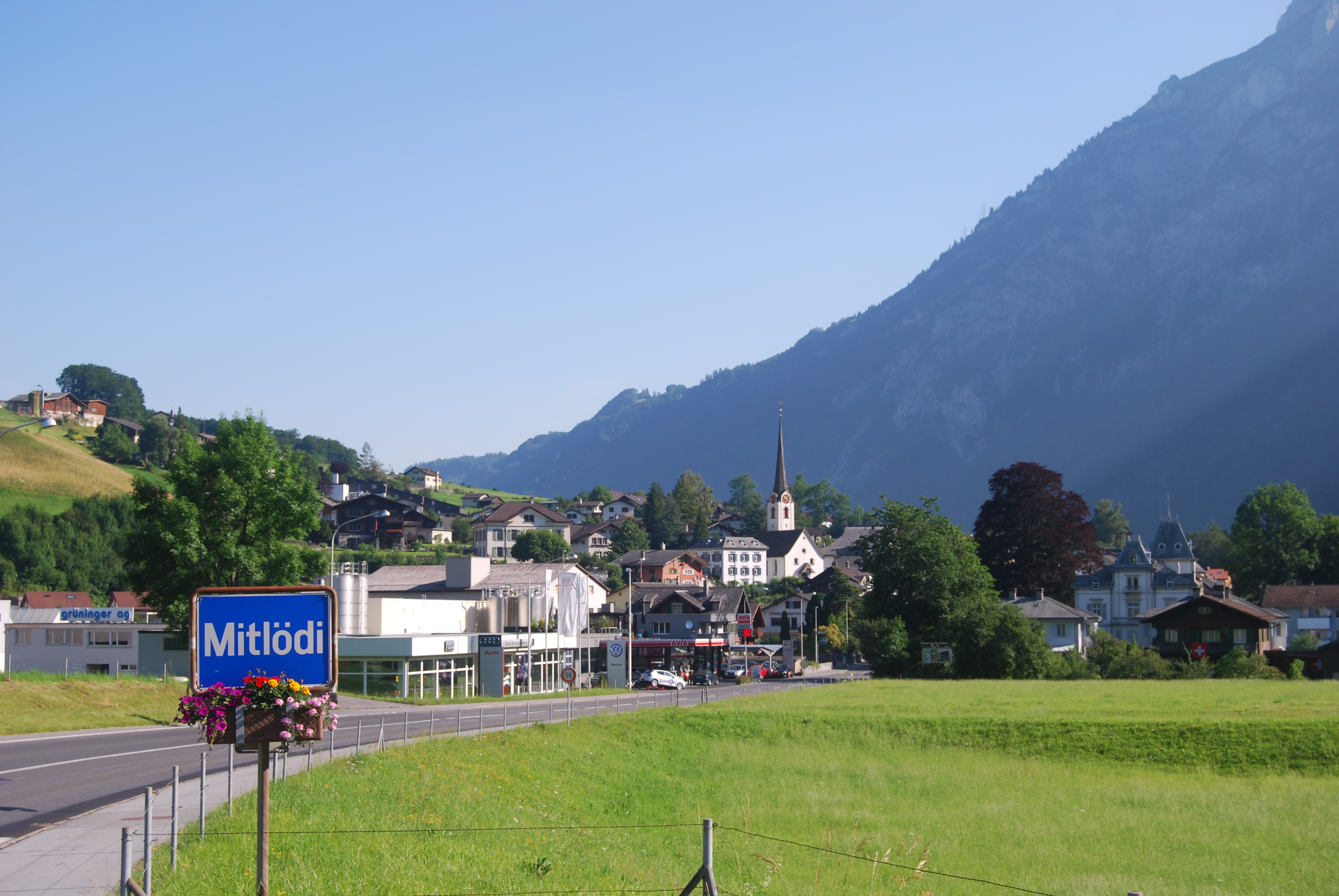
Mitlödi village

The municipality of Glarus Süd was created on 1 January 2011, incorporating the former municipalities of Betschwanden, Braunwald, Elm, Engi, Haslen, Linthal, Luchsingen, Matt, Mitlödi, Rüti, Schwanden, Schwändi and Sool. At the time of its creation, Glarus Süd was the largest Swiss municipality by area. As of 1 January 2015, it was overtaken in size by the expanded municipality of Scuol in the canton of Graubünden.

== Geography ==
Glarus Süd incorporates all of the valley of the Linth river from Mitlödi, just upstream of the town of Glarus, to the source, together with the whole of the valley of the Sernf river that joins the Linth in Schwanden. It also incorporates the mountain ranges that flank both valleys and separate them. With the exception of the resort village of Braunwald, all the centres of population of the municipality lie in one or other valley. Heading upstream from Mitlödi along the valley of the Linth, the villages of Sool, Schwändi, Schwanden, Nidfurn, Haslen, Leuggelbach, Luchsingen, Hätzingen, Diesbach, Betschwanden, Rüti and Linthal are encountered. Heading upstream from Schwanden along the valley of the Sernf, the villages of Engi, Matt and Elm are encountered.

After the 2011 merger Glarus Süd had an area of 430.03 km^{2} (166.04 sq mi). Based on the 2004/09 survey, about 28.8% of the total area is used for agricultural purposes, while 27.0% is forested. Of the rest of the land, 1.6% is settled (buildings or roads) and 42.6% is unproductive land. Over the past two decades (1979/85-2004/09) the amount of land that is settled has increased by 117 ha (290 acres) and the agricultural land has decreased by 571 ha (1,410 acres).

The municipality encompasses altitudes from 504 m (1,654 ft) at Mitlödi to the summit of Tödi at 3,614 m (11,857 ft). Other notable peaks include Bifertenstock (3,419 m or 11,217 ft), Clariden (3,267 m or 10,719 ft), Hausstock (3,158 m or 10,361 ft), Ruchi (3,107 m or 10,194 ft), Selbsanft (3,029 m or 9,938 ft), Glärnisch (2,915 m or 9,564 ft), Kärpf (2,794 m or 9,167 ft), Ortstock (2,717 m or 8,914 ft), Rüchigrat (2,657 m or 8,717 ft), Foostock (2,611 m or 8,566 ft), Magerrain (2,524 m or 8,281 ft), Gulderstock (2,511 m or 8,238 ft), Spitzmeilen (2,501 m or 8,205 ft), Bützistock (2,496 m or 8,189 ft), Wissgandstöckli (2,488 m or 8,163 ft), Eggstock (2,455 m or 8,054 ft), Gufelstock (2,436 m or 7,992 ft), Vorder Glärnisch (2,327 m or 7,635 ft) and Gandstock (2,315 m or 7,595 ft). Notable reservoir lakes are Limmernsee (1,857 m or 6,093 ft) and Garichtisee (1,648 m or 5,407 ft).

== Demographics ==
Glarus Süd has a population (as of December 2020) of 9,480. As of 2013, 18.3% of the population are resident foreign nationals. Over the last 3 years (2010–2013) the population has changed at a rate of 0.16%. The birth rate in the municipality, in 2013, was 7.9 while the death rate was 9.1 per thousand residents.

As of 2013, children and teenagers (0–19 years old) make up 17.3% of the population, while adults (20–64 years old) are 61.2% and seniors (over 64 years old) make up 21.6%.

== Historic population ==
The historical population is given in the following chart:

== Heritage sites ==
There are thirteen Swiss heritage sites of national significance located in the new municipality. Braunwald is home to two, Bergeten which is the ruins of a medieval alpine camp and the Ortstockhaus. Elm has three, the Gross house, the Suworow house and the Zentner house all located in the village. Engi, Haslen, Linthal and Luchsingen each only have one, the Naturwissenschaftliche Sammlungen Des Kantons Glarus, Engi, the Spinnerei Daniel Jenny & Co, the Pantenbrücke (bridge) and the Sunnezyt House respectively. There are two in Matt, the Brummbach house and the Steggut house. Mitlödi has one, the Schiffmeister / Schönenberger house while Schwanden has the Industrial Archives of Glarus. There are three villages and two hamlets which appear on the Inventory of Swiss Heritage Sites, the villages of Elm, Diesbach and Rüti along with the hamlets of Steinibach and Adlenbach.

In 1981, the Wakker Prize was awarded to Elm for the development and preservation of its architectural heritage.

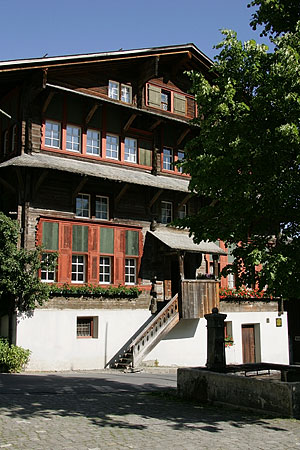
Gross House

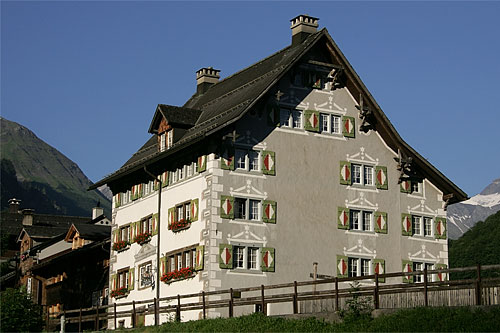
Suworow House

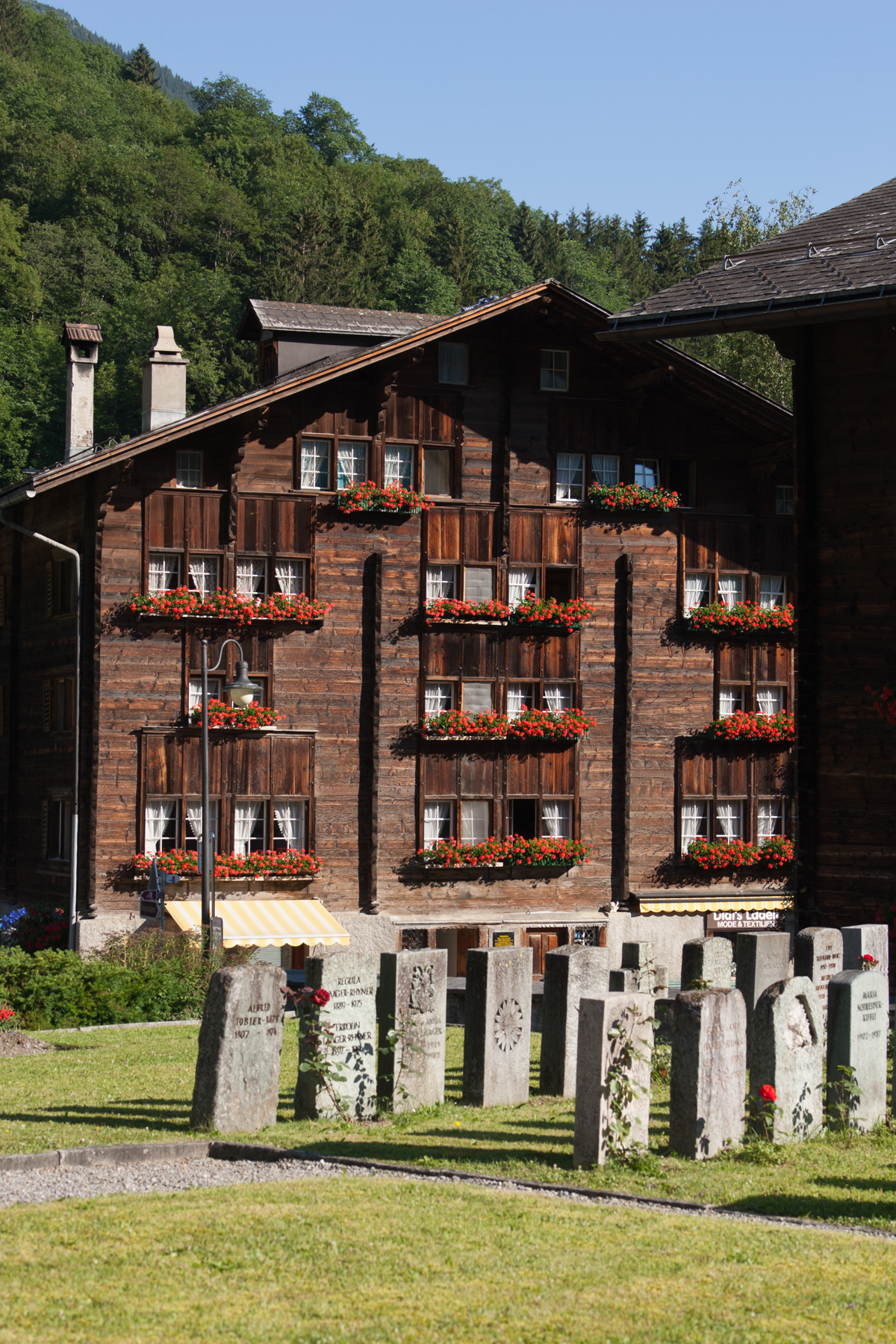
Zentner House

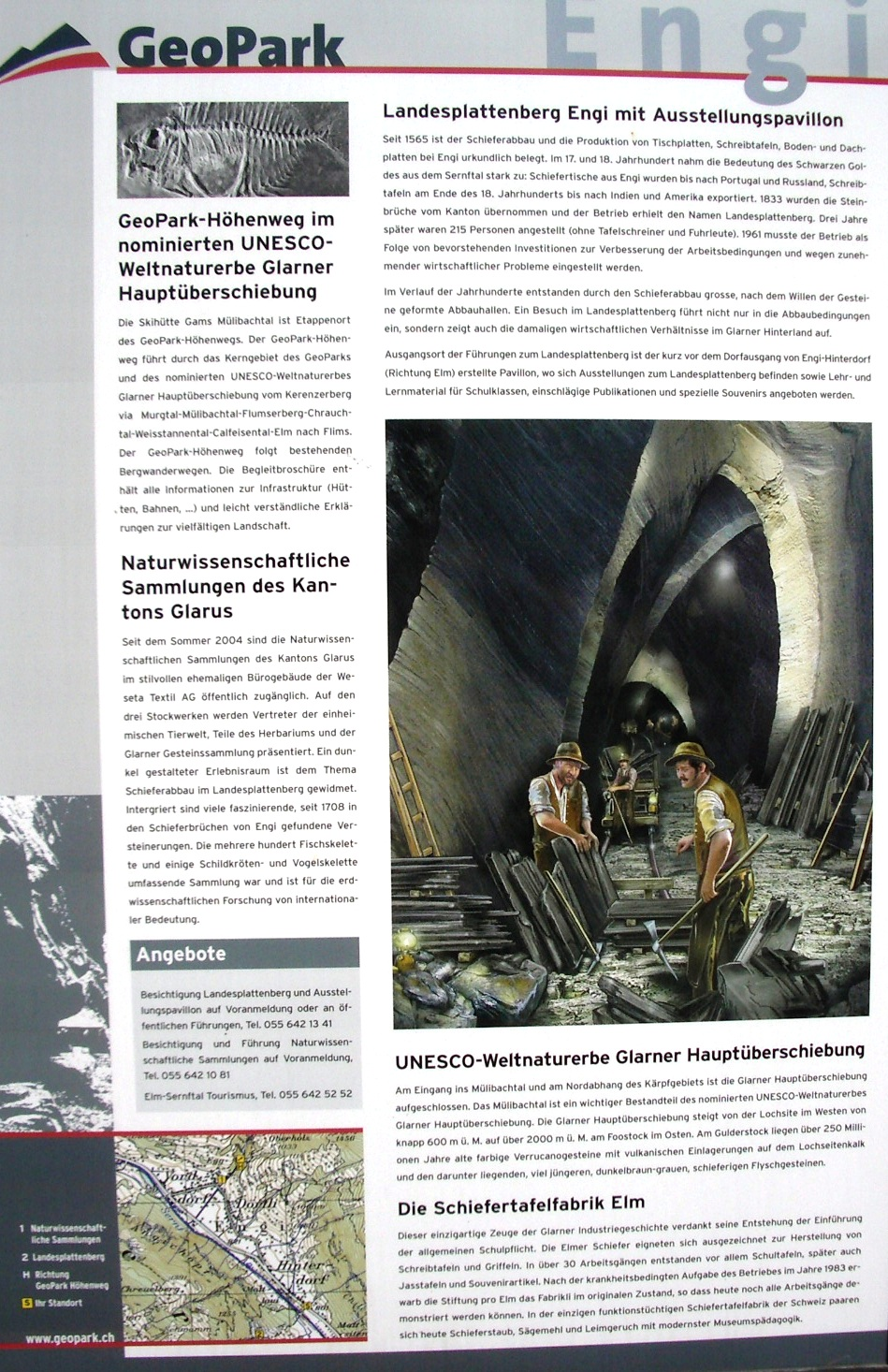
Naturwissenschaftliche Sammlungen Des Kantons Glarus, Engi

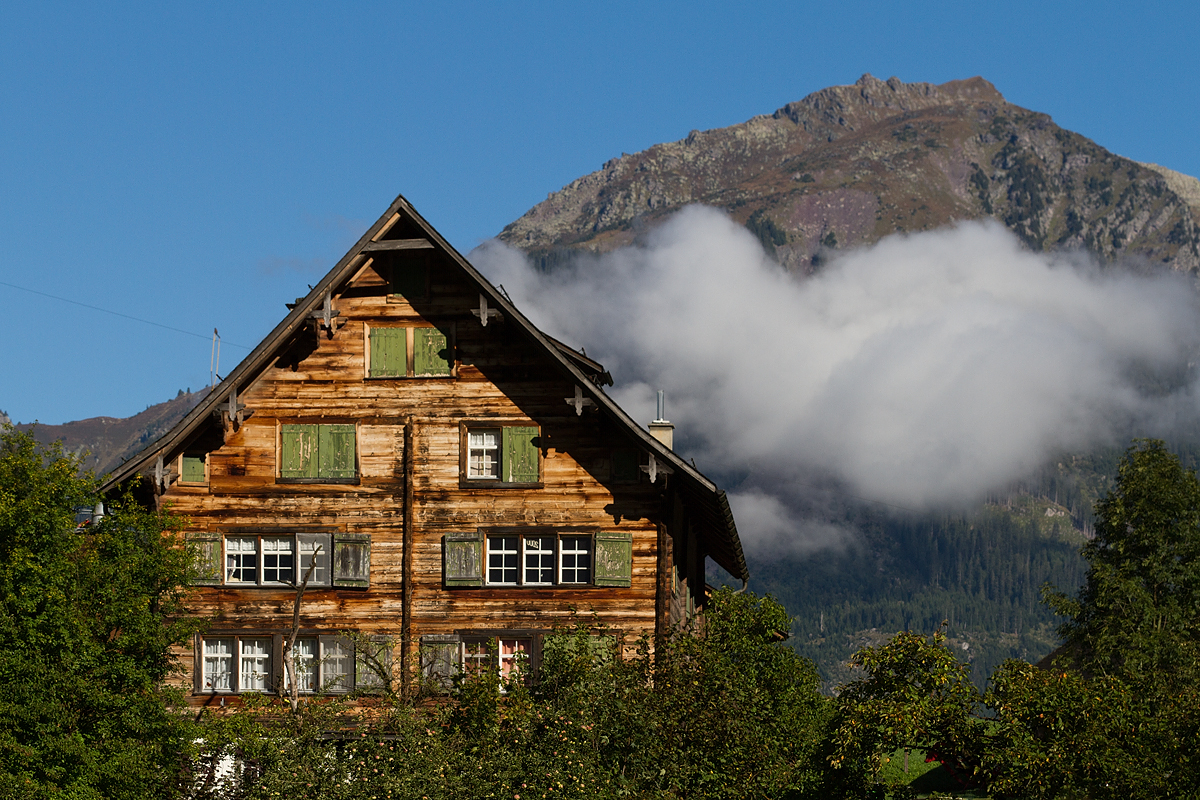
Brummbach House

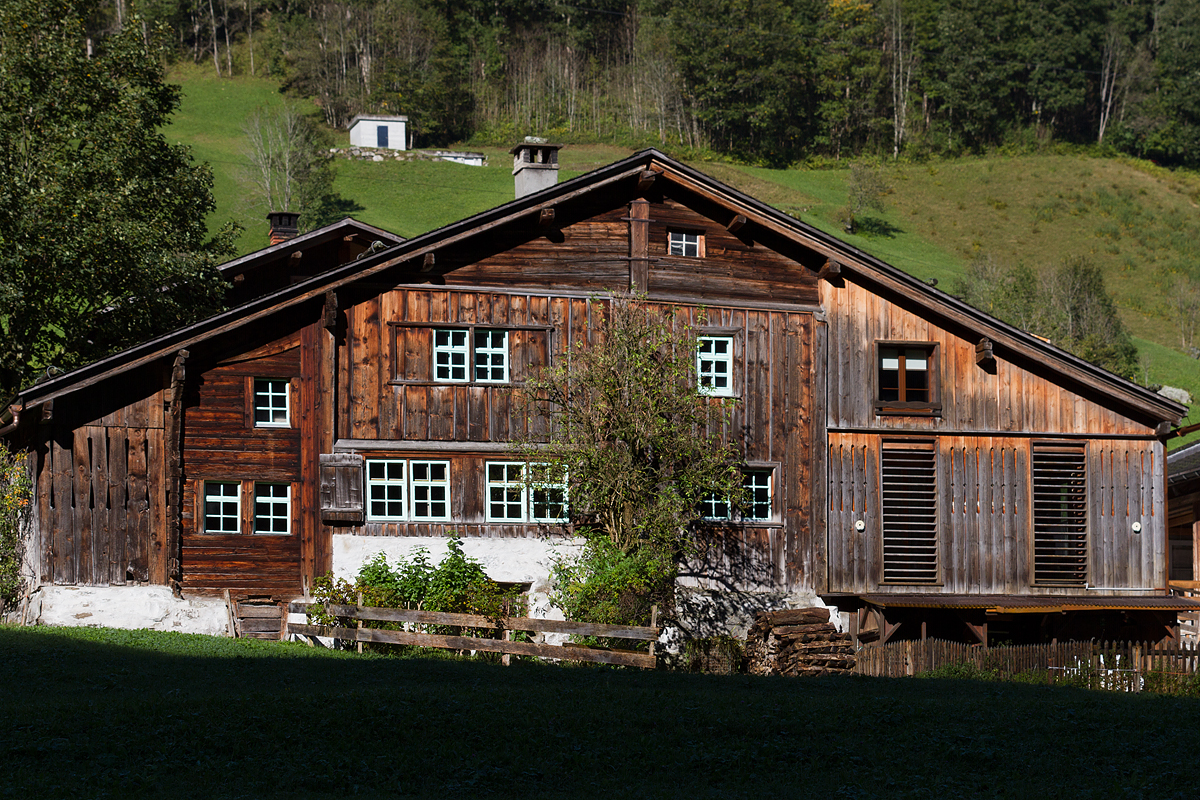
Steggut House

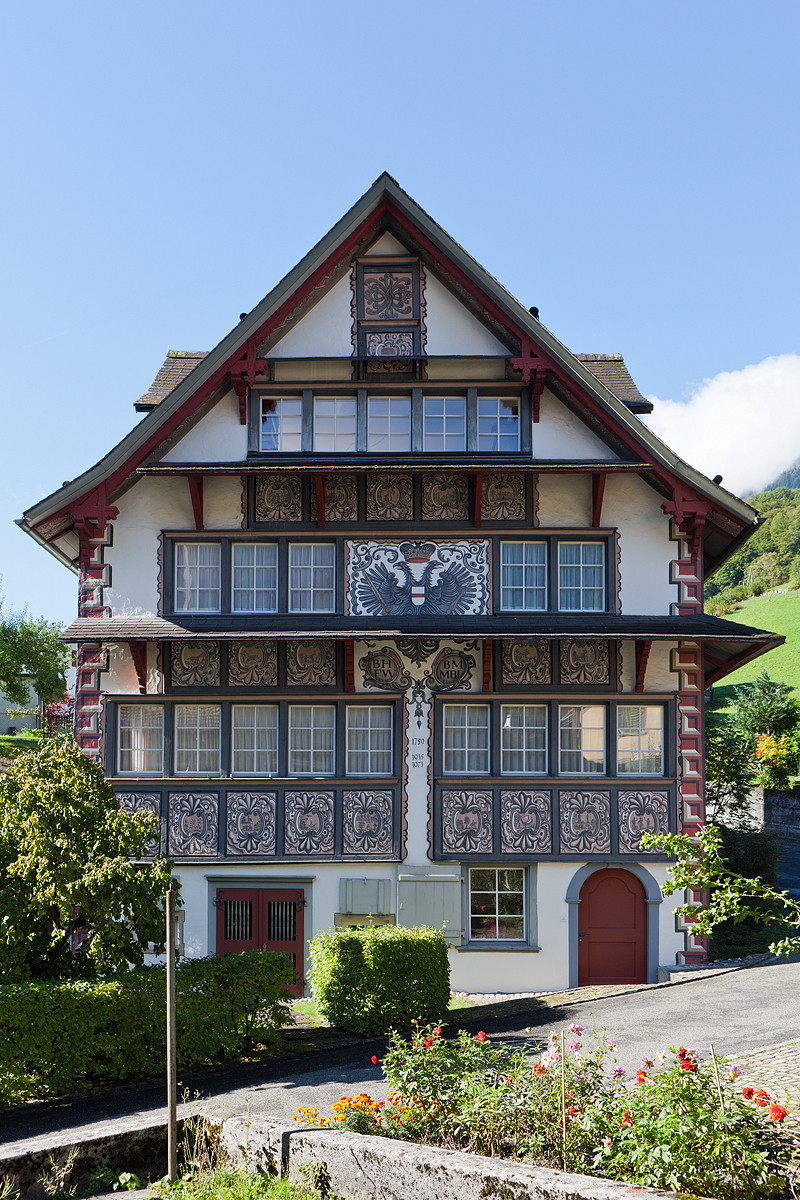
Schiffmeister House / Schönenberger House

== Economy ==
The major occupation in the area was agriculture, including sheepherding since 1000. In the 18th century, the wool industry (home-based) became an important economic factor. In the 17th and early 18th centuries, beef cattle were pastured in the Alps in summer for export to Italy.

The baths at Wichlen in the former municipality of Elm were in use since the Middle Ages and are first mentioned in 1547. They were very popular until they were buried by an avalanche in 1762. Many characteristic wooden structures have survived. In 1898, a new Kurhaus was opened, which flourished until World War I. Today, it is used as a retirement center.

Starting in 1861, slate was quarried from the Tschingelberg for school tablets and styluses.

The mineral water firm Mineralquellen Elm AG opened in Elm in 1929 and remains in operation today.

As of 2012, there were a total of 5,046 people employed in the municipality. Of these, 455 people worked in 180 businesses in the primary economic sector. The secondary sector employed 2,197 workers in 156 separate businesses. Finally, the tertiary sector provided 2,394 jobs in 481 businesses. In 2013 a total of 3.9% of the population received social assistance.

== Politics ==
In the 2015 federal election the most popular party was the SP with 51.0% of the vote, followed by the BDP with 45.2%. The remaining 3.7% of the vote went to other candidates with no or minor party affiliation. In the federal election, a total of 3,285 votes were cast, and the voter turnout was 46.7%. The 2015 election saw a large change in the voting when compared to 2011. The percentage of the vote received by the SP increased sharply from 22.8% in 2011 to 51.0% in 2015, while the percentage that the BDP dropped from 60.3% to 45.2%.

== Crime ==
In 2014 the crime rate, of the over 200 crimes listed in the Swiss Criminal Code (running from murder, robbery and assault to accepting bribes and election fraud), in Glarus Süd was 23.1 per thousand residents. This rate is only 35.8% of the average rate in the entire country. During the same period, the rate of drug crimes was 11.1 per thousand residents, which was slightly higher than the national rate of 9.9.

== Transport ==
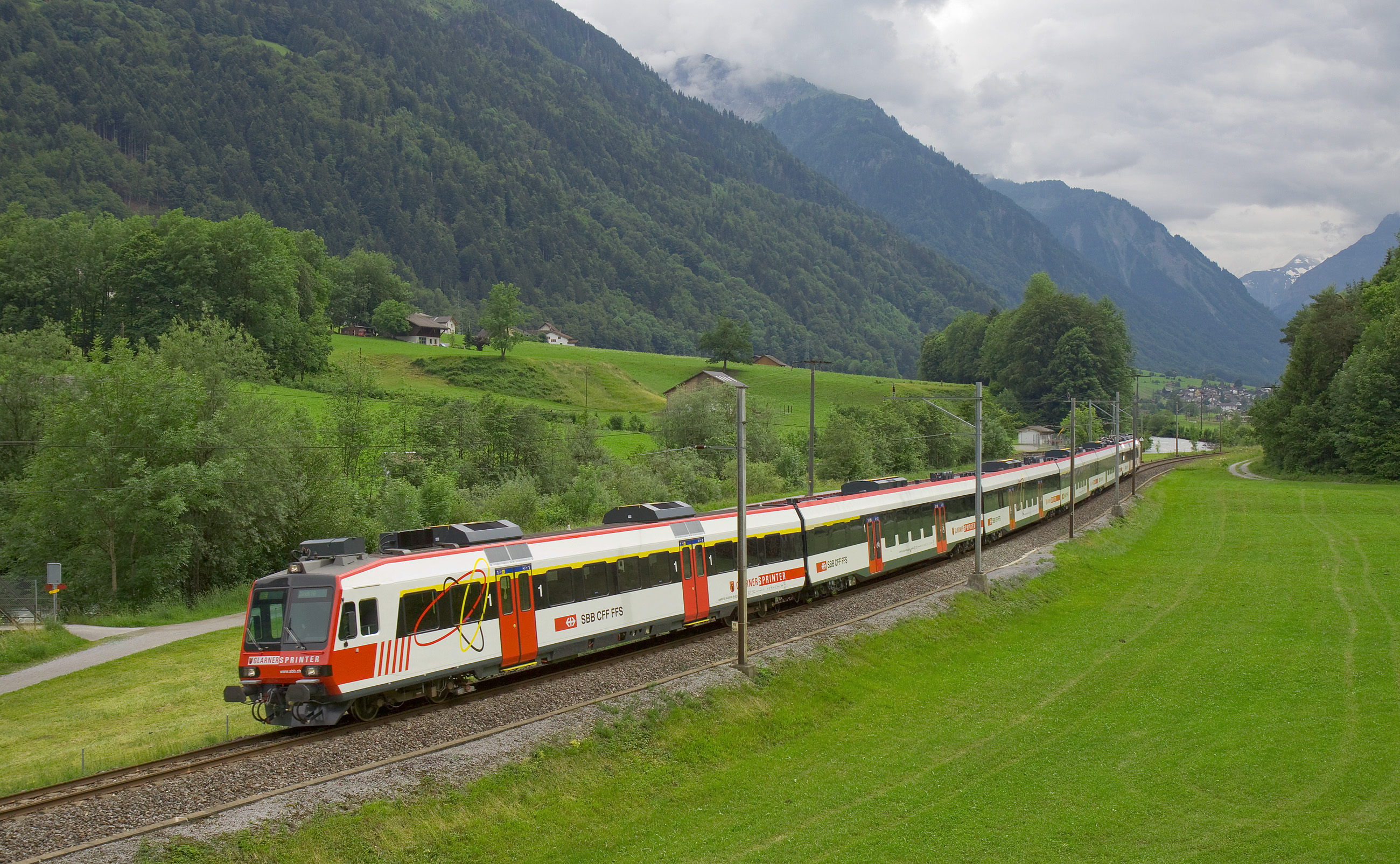
The Glarner Sprinter train between Nidfurn and Leuggelbach villages

The Weesen to Linthal railway line traverses the municipality of Glarus Süd along the valley of the Linth river, serving the stations of Mitlödi, Schwanden, Nidfurn-Haslen, Leuggelbach, Luchsingen-Hätzingen, Diesbach-Betschwanden, Rüti GL, Linthal Braunwaldbahn and Linthal. The line is served by the Zürich S-Bahn service S25 to and from Zurich, which operates an hourly service the full length of the line calling at all the above stations, replacing the earlier Glarner Sprinter train. There is also an hourly St. Gallen S-Bahn service S6 to and from Rapperswil, which serves Mitlodi before terminating at Schwanden.

Sernftalbus operates an hourly bus service linking Schwanden station with communities in the valley of the Sernf river, including Engi, Matt and Elm, following the route of the Sernftal tramway that ran between 1904 and 1969. The same company also operates an hourly service from Schwanden station to nearby Schwändi, and a less frequent service to Sool. PostAuto Schweiz operates a service from Linthal station to Flüelen station, on the Gotthard railway and Lake Lucerne, which provides several daily return journeys across the Klausen Pass between June and September.

The Braunwald funicular provides a link between Linthal Braunwaldbahn station and the car-free resort of Braunwald on the mountain side above.

== Climate ==
Between 1961 and 1990 the former municipality of Braunwald had an average of 161.3 days of rain per year and on average received 2,025 mm (79.7 in) of precipitation. The wettest month was August during which time Braunwald received an average of 206 mm (8.1 in) of precipitation. During this month there was precipitation for an average of 15.4 days. The month with the most days of precipitation was July, with an average of 16, but with only 199 mm (7.8 in) of precipitation. The driest month of the year was October with an average of 120 mm (4.7 in) of precipitation over 15.4 days.

Over the same time period the former municipality of Elm had an average of 156.1 days of rain per year and on average received 1,524 mm (60.0 in) of precipitation. The wettest month was August during which time Elm received an average of 171 mm (6.7 in) of precipitation. During this month there was precipitation for an average of 15.3 days. The month with the most days of precipitation was June, with an average of 15.9, but with only 152 mm (6.0 in) of precipitation. The driest month of the year was October with an average of 96 mm (3.8 in) of precipitation over 15.3 days.

Climate data for Elm village (1991–2020)
Month	Jan	Feb	Mar	Apr	May	Jun	Jul	Aug	Sep	Oct	Nov	Dec	Year
Mean daily maximum °C (°F)	1.9 (35.4)	3.0 (37.4)	7.5 (45.5)	12.0 (53.6)	16.4 (61.5)	19.5 (67.1)	21.0 (69.8)	20.4 (68.7)	16.5 (61.7)	12.8 (55.0)	6.6 (43.9)	2.5 (36.5)	11.7 (53.1)
Daily mean °C (°F)	−1.8 (28.8)	−1.1 (30.0)	2.5 (36.5)	6.7 (44.1)	10.8 (51.4)	14.0 (57.2)	15.6 (60.1)	15.3 (59.5)	11.6 (52.9)	7.9 (46.2)	2.7 (36.9)	−0.9 (30.4)	6.9 (44.4)
Mean daily minimum °C (°F)	−5.6 (21.9)	−5.4 (22.3)	−1.8 (28.8)	1.7 (35.1)	5.8 (42.4)	9.2 (48.6)	10.9 (51.6)	10.9 (51.6)	7.3 (45.1)	3.8 (38.8)	−0.9 (30.4)	−4.5 (23.9)	2.6 (36.7)
Average precipitation mm (inches)	103 (4.1)	90 (3.5)	114 (4.5)	105 (4.1)	140 (5.5)	163 (6.4)	184 (7.2)	194 (7.6)	142 (5.6)	116 (4.6)	120 (4.7)	117 (4.6)	1,588 (62.5)
Average snowfall cm (inches)	85 (33)	86 (34)	60 (24)	34 (13)	3 (1.2)	0 (0)	0 (0)	0 (0)	0 (0)	12 (4.7)	52 (20)	83 (33)	415 (163)
Average precipitation days (≥ 1.0 mm)	11.2	10.3	12.4	11.7	14.8	15.3	15.4	15.3	12.2	10.6	11.4	11.8	152.4
Average snowy days (≥ 1.0 cm)	9.1	8.9	7.0	3.9	0.7	0.0	0.0	0.0	0.1	1.2	5.8	9.3	46.0
Average relative humidity (%)	75	73	72	69	73	77	79	80	81	78	78	78	76
Source: MeteoSwiss

== Notable people ==
- Rico Elmer (b.1969), a ski mountaineer, was born in Elm.
- Thomas Johannessen Heftye (1767–1827) emigrated from Hätzingen to Norway in 1791, where he founded the Thos. Joh. Heftye & Søn bank, and a dynasty of notable Norwegian businessmen and politicians, including Johannes Thomassen Heftye (1792–1856), Henrik Thomassen Heftye (1804–1864), Thomas Johannessen Heftye (1822–1886) and Thomas Thomassen Heftye (1860–1921).
- Jakob Klaesi (1883–1980), a psychiatrist best known for his contributions to sleep therapy, was born in Luchsingen.
- Vreni Schneider (b.1964), an olympic gold and world champion in slalom and giant slalom, was born in Elm.

== See also ==
- Glarus Alps
