= Höch Turm =

Mountain in Switzerland

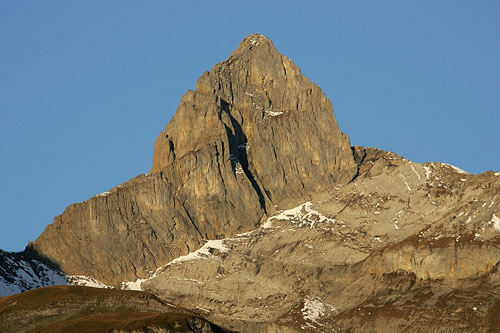
- The east face from Braunwald

Highest point
- Elevation: 2,666 m (8,747 ft)
- Prominence: 264 m (866 ft)
- Parent peak: Ortstock
- Coordinates: 46°55′55.7″N 8°56′8.6″E

Geography
- Location within Switzerland
- Location: Schwyz, Switzerland
- Parent range: Schwyzer Alps

The Höch Turm is a mountain in the Schwyzer Alps, located in an elevation of 2,666 m (8,747 ft). It lies west of the resort village of Braunwald on the karstic range between the valleys of Muota and Linth.

Administratively, the mountain lies in the municipality of Muotathal, in the canton of Schwyz.
