= Linthal Braunwaldbahn railway station =

Railway station in Switzerland

Linthal Braunwaldbahn
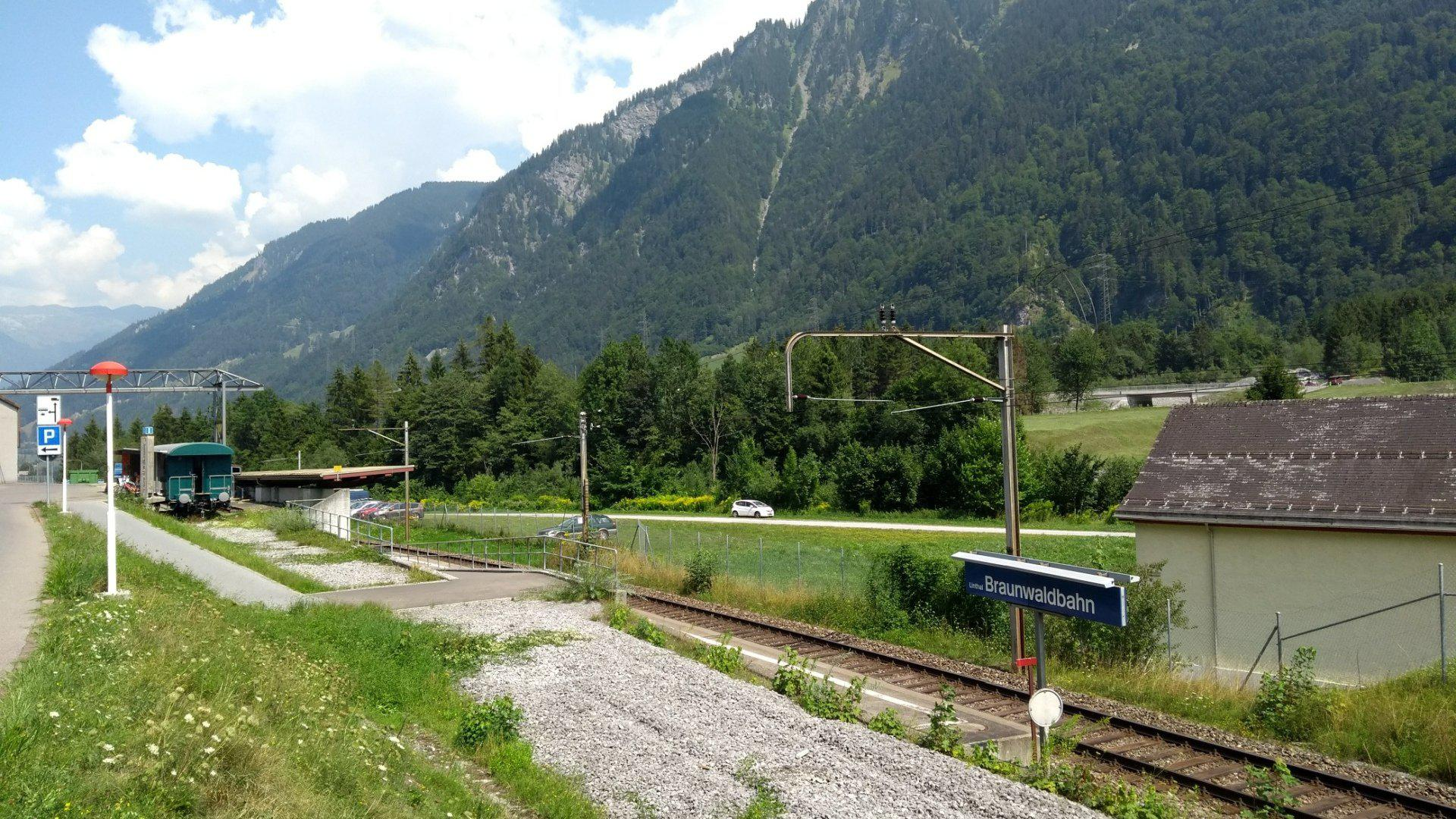
- Linthal Braunwaldbahn railway station

General information
- Location: Stachelbergstrasse; Linthal; Glarus Süd, Glarus; Switzerland
- Coordinates: 46.928081°N 9.002824°E
- Owner: Swiss Federal Railways
- Operator: Swiss Federal Railways
- Line: Weesen-Linthal
- Connections: Braunwaldbahn funicular

Services
Preceding station	Zurich S-Bahn	Following station
Rüti GL towards Zürich HB	S25	Linthal Terminus
Location
- Location within Switzerland

Linthal Braunwaldbahn railway station is a railway station in the municipality of Glarus Süd in the Swiss canton of Glarus. It is situated on the Weesen to Linthal railway line in the valley of the Linth river, some 500 metres (1,600 ft) short of the terminus of the line at Linthal station in the village of Linthal. The station opened in 1982 in order to provide a convenient interchange with the Braunwaldbahn funicular to the car-free resort of Braunwald on the mountain above.

The station is served by the hourly Zürich S-Bahn service S25 between Zurich and Linthal (during off-peak hours by S6 service of St. Gallen S-Bahn).

== Services ==
As of the December 2023 timetable change, the following services call at Linthal Braunwaldbahn railway station:

- St. Gallen S-Bahn:
  - S6: hourly service between Linthal and Rapperswil via Ziegelbrücke (only during off-peak hours).
- Zürich S-Bahn:
  - S25: hourly service between Linthal and Zürich HB via Ziegelbrücke.
