= Diesbach, Glarus =

Diesbach
- Village (and former municipality)
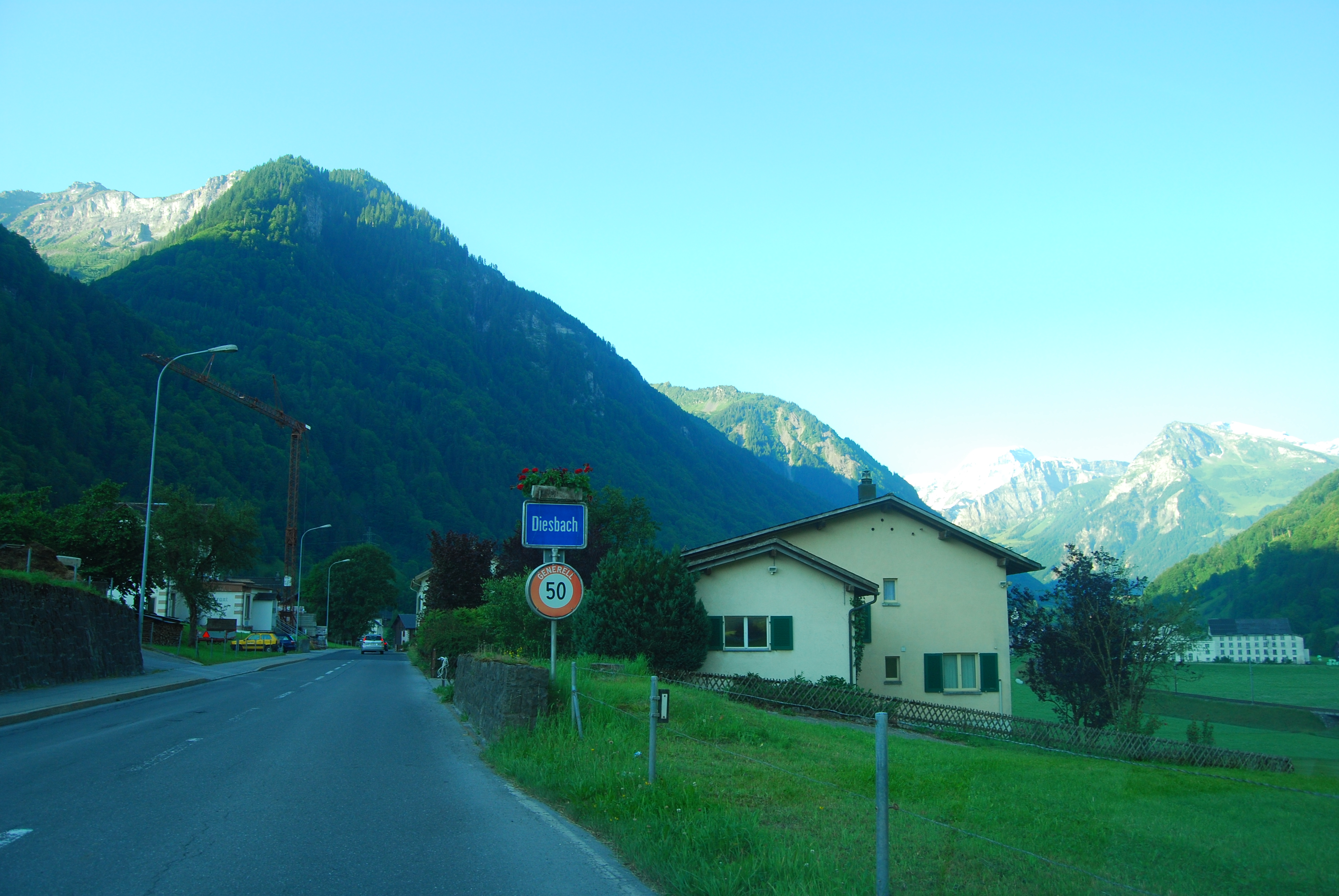

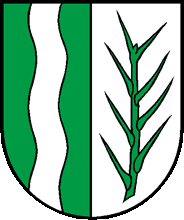
- Coat of arms

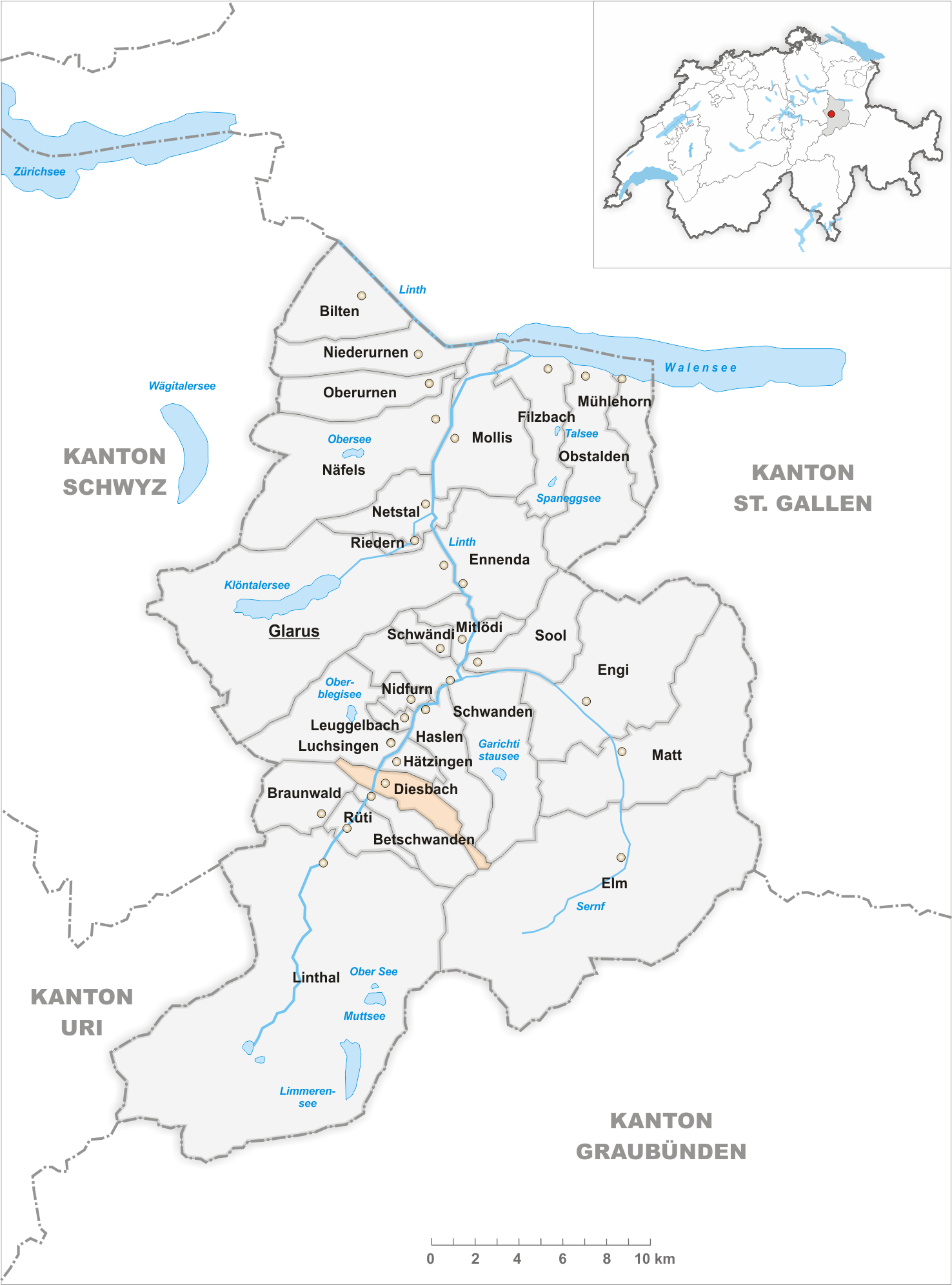
- The former municipal area (2003)
- Coordinates: 46°57′4″N 9°01′53″E
- Country: Switzerland
- Canton: Glarus
- Municipality: Glarus Süd
- Elevation: 604 m (1,982 ft)

Diesbach is a village, and former municipality, in the municipality of Glarus Süd and canton of Glarus in Switzerland.

== History ==
Diesbach is first recorded in 1350 as Diesbach.

In 2004, the municipality of Diesbach was merged into the municipality of Luchsingen. On 1 January 2011, the municipality of Luchsingen was itself merged into the new municipality of Glarus Süd.

== Geography ==
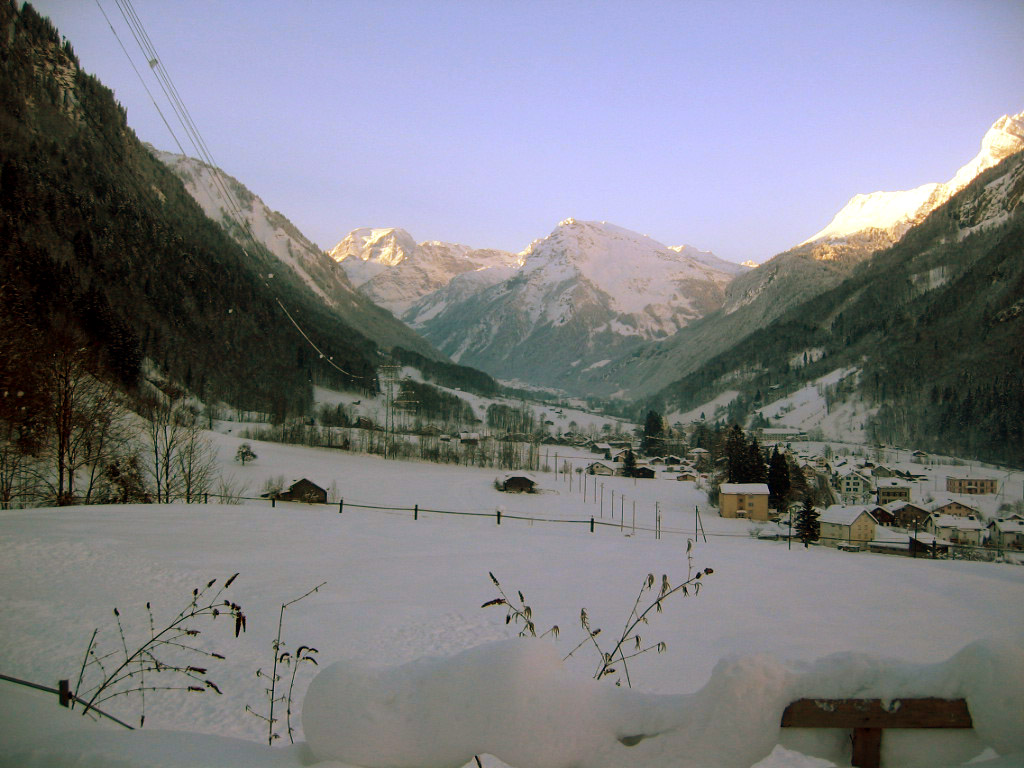
Diesbach in winter

Diesbach is located in the valley of the Linth river, with the village situated on the east bank of the river, at an elevation of approximately 604 m (1,982 ft). The village of Betschwanden lies to the south and Hätzingen to the north. Above the village to the south-east is the mountain of Kärpf (2,794 m or 9,167 ft).

== Transport ==
Diesbach is located on the Hauptstrasse 17, which runs the length of the canton of Glarus before climbing the Klausen Pass into the canton of Uri, as well as on the Weesen to Linthal railway line that parallels the main road and the Linth river through Glarus. The high alpine Klausen Pass is normally only open to traffic between June and September, and for the rest of the year the road and railway up the valley form the only access to the village. The village is served by Diesbach-Betschwanden railway station, which is served by the hourly Zürich S-Bahn service S25 between Linthal and Zurich.

== Demographics ==
The historical population of Diesbach is given in the following table:

| year | population |
|---|---|
| 1837 | 466 |
| 1850 | 419 |
| 1900 | 461 |
| 1950 | 476 |
| 2000 | 237 |
