= Braunwald, Glarus =

Braunwald
- Village
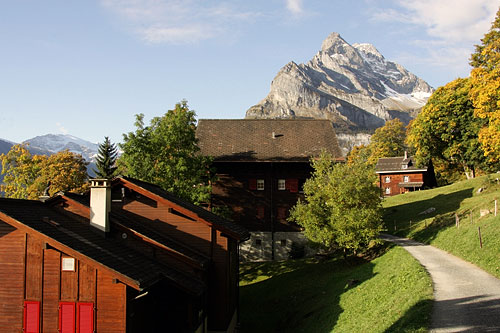

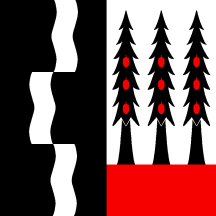
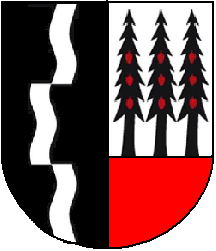
- Flag Coat of arms

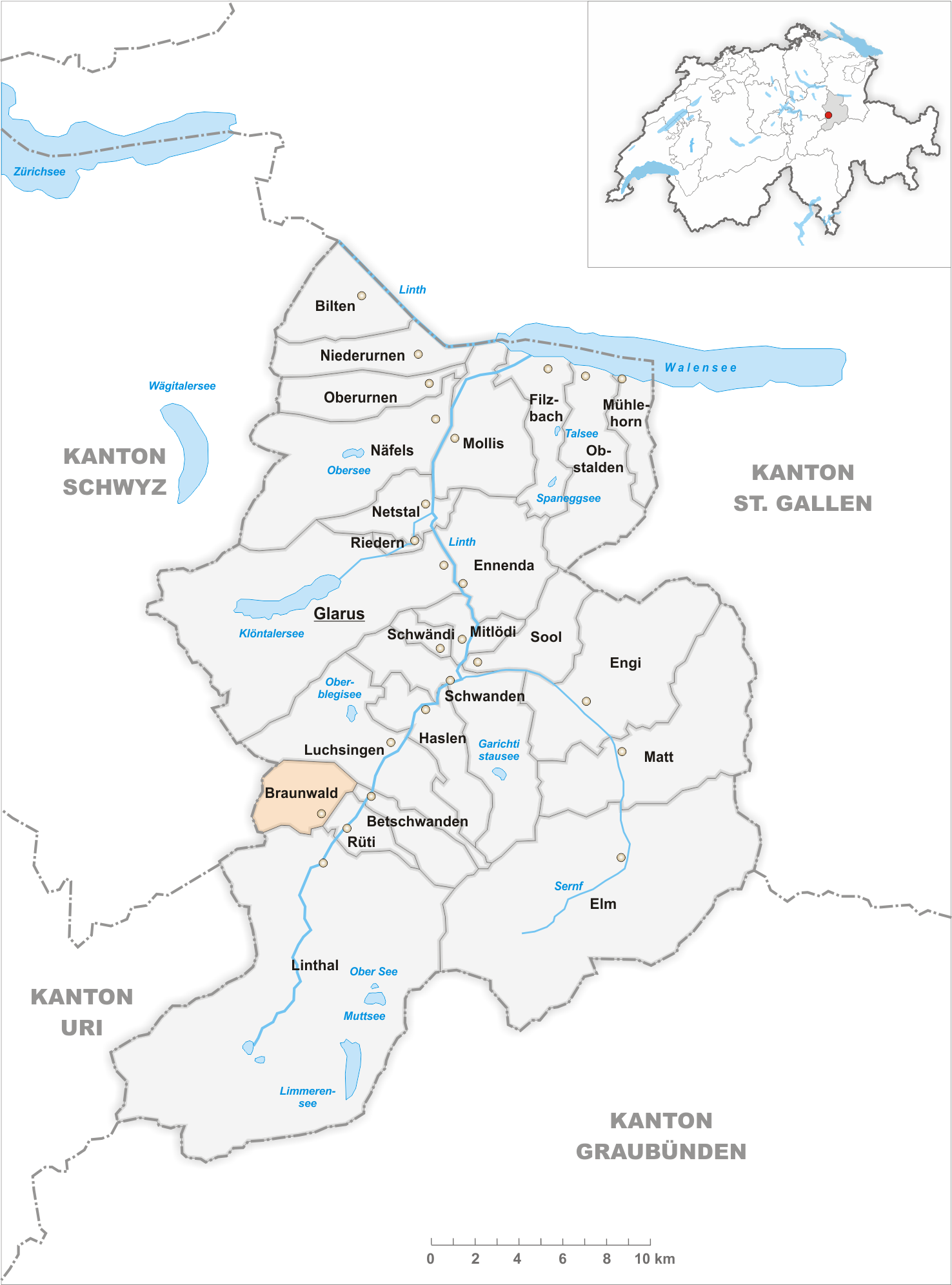
- The former municipal area (2007)
- Coordinates: 46°56′N 9°00′E
- Country: Switzerland
- Canton: Glarus
- Municipality: Glarus Süd

Area
  - Total: 10.13 km^{2} (3.91 sq mi)
- Elevation: 1,256 m (4,121 ft)

Population (December 2020)
  - Total: 308
  - Density: 30.4/km^{2} (78.7/sq mi)

Braunwald is a car-free resort village in the municipality of Glarus Süd and canton of Glarus in Switzerland.

== History ==
Aerial view from 1300 m by Walter Mittelholzer (1927)

Braunwald is first mentioned in 1421 as Brunwald. There is evidence of summer occupation between the 12th and 15th centuries and, by 1725, a few families were living there year-round. A school was first held in 1841, and moved into its own building in 1857. The Niederschlacht Inn, built in 1856, became a famous hotel. The opening of the Braunwald funicular in 1907 was followed by the opening of further hotels, including the Grand Hotel Bellevue (now the Märchenhotel Bellevue), the Alpina Hotel (now the Adrenalin Backpackers Hostel) and the Alpenblick Hotel (which was destroyed by fire in 2009). In the second half of the 20th century, several chair lifts and gondola lifts opened to provide access to the ski slopes above the village.

Until 1939, the village of Braunwald formed part of the municipality of Rüti, but, in that year Braunwald split off to form its own municipality. On 1 January 2011, both municipalities were reunited as part of the new municipality of Glarus Süd.

== Geography ==
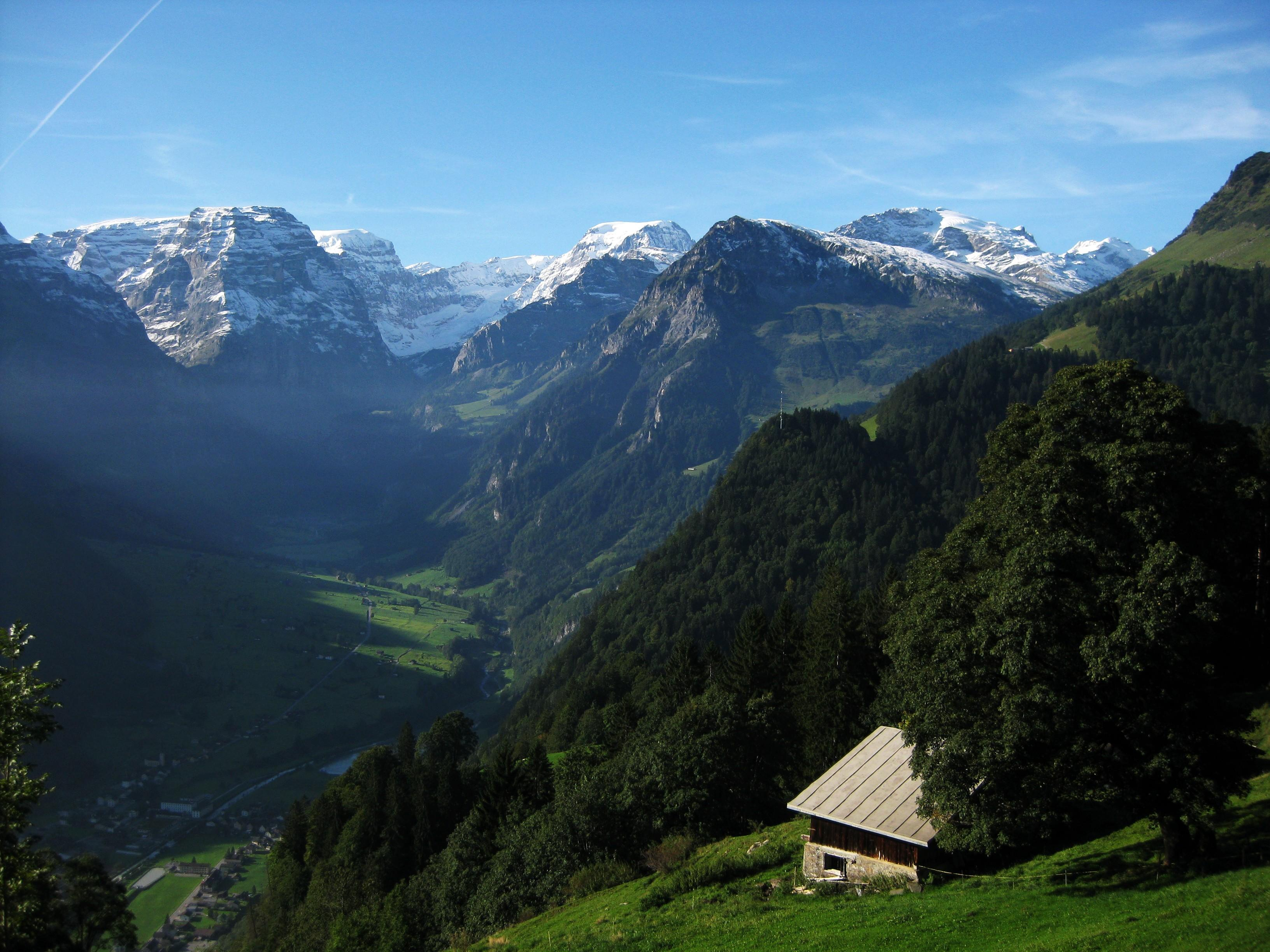
View from Braunwald

Braunwald is situated in the Glarus Alps on a terrace above the Linth valley, at an elevation of 1,256 meters (4,121 ft). It overlooks the villages of Linthal and Rüti in the valley below. It is overlooked by the mountains of Ortstock (2,717 m or 8,914 ft), Höch Turm (2,666 m or 8,747 ft), Eggstock (2,455 m or 8,054 ft) and Bös Fulen (2,802 m or 9,193 ft).

Braunwald has an area, as defined by the former municipal boundaries in 2006, of 10.1 km^{2} (3.9 sq mi). Of this area, 43.7% is used for agricultural purposes, while 28.5% is forested. Of the rest of the land, 3.2% is settled (buildings or roads) and the remainder (24.6%) is non-productive (rivers, glaciers or mountains).

== Transport ==
Braunwald is a car-free resort village, and access to the village is via the Braunwald funicular from the village of Linthal in the valley below. The funicular links Braunwald with Linthal Braunwaldbahn station, where over 750 parking spaces are available. The station provides a convenient interchange with the main line railway, and is served by the hourly S25 service of Zurich S-Bahn from/to Zurich during the day or the S6 of St. Gallen S-Bahn from/to Rapperswil (during evening hours), both via Ziegelbrücke. The latter is a junction station, with connections to InterRegio and regional trains.

Taxi services for transport within the village are available from Schuler Transporte and Schumi-trans. Gondola lifts and chair lifts link the village to Grotzenbüel, Kleiner Gumen, Seblengrat and Bächital, principally for winter sport activities but in some cases operating in summer as well.

== Demographics ==
Braunwald has a population, as of 31 December 2020 and as defined by the former municipal boundaries, of 308. As of 2007, 13.0% of the population was made up of foreign nationals. Over the last 10 years the population has decreased at a rate of -25.4%. Most of the population (as of 2000) speaks German (93.6%), with Serbo-Croatian being second most common ( 3.2%) and Dutch being third ( 1.2%).

In the 2007 federal election the most popular party was the SPS which received 57.9% of the vote. Most of the rest of the votes went to the SVP with 38.2% of the vote.

The entire Swiss population is generally well educated. In Braunwald about 70.6% of the population (between age 25–64) have completed either non-mandatory upper secondary education or additional higher education (either University or a Fachhochschule).

Braunwald has an unemployment rate of 1.2%. As of 2005, there were 40 people employed in the primary economic sector and about 15 businesses involved in this sector. 20 people are employed in the secondary sector and there are 7 businesses in this sector. 215 people are employed in the tertiary sector, with 28 businesses in this sector.

The historical population is given in the following table:

year	population
1941	327
1950	402
1960	491
2000	408

== Weather ==
Braunwald has an average of 161.3 days of rain per year and on average receives 2,025 mm (79.7 in) of precipitation. The wettest month is August during which time Braunwald receives an average of 206 mm (8.1 in) of precipitation. During this month there is precipitation for an average of 15.4 days. The month with the most days of precipitation is July, with an average of 16, but with only 199 mm (7.8 in) of precipitation. The driest month of the year is October with an average of 120 mm (4.7 in) of precipitation over 15.4 days.

Braunwald is the municipality with the highest annual snowfall in Switzerland.

== See also ==
- List of ski areas and resorts in Switzerland
