= Rüti, Glarus =

Rüti
- Village (and former municipality)
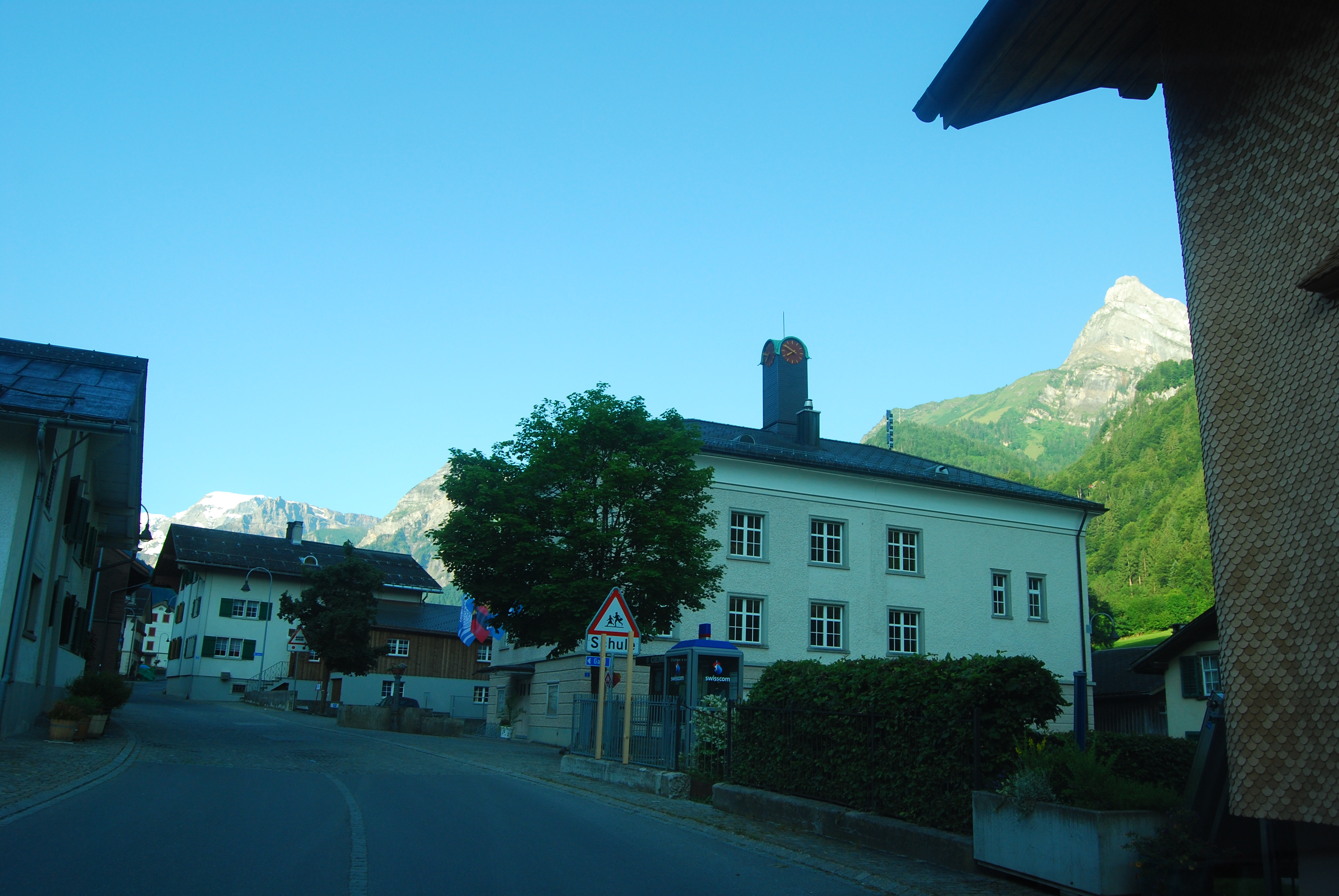

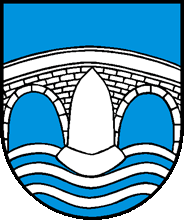
- Coat of arms

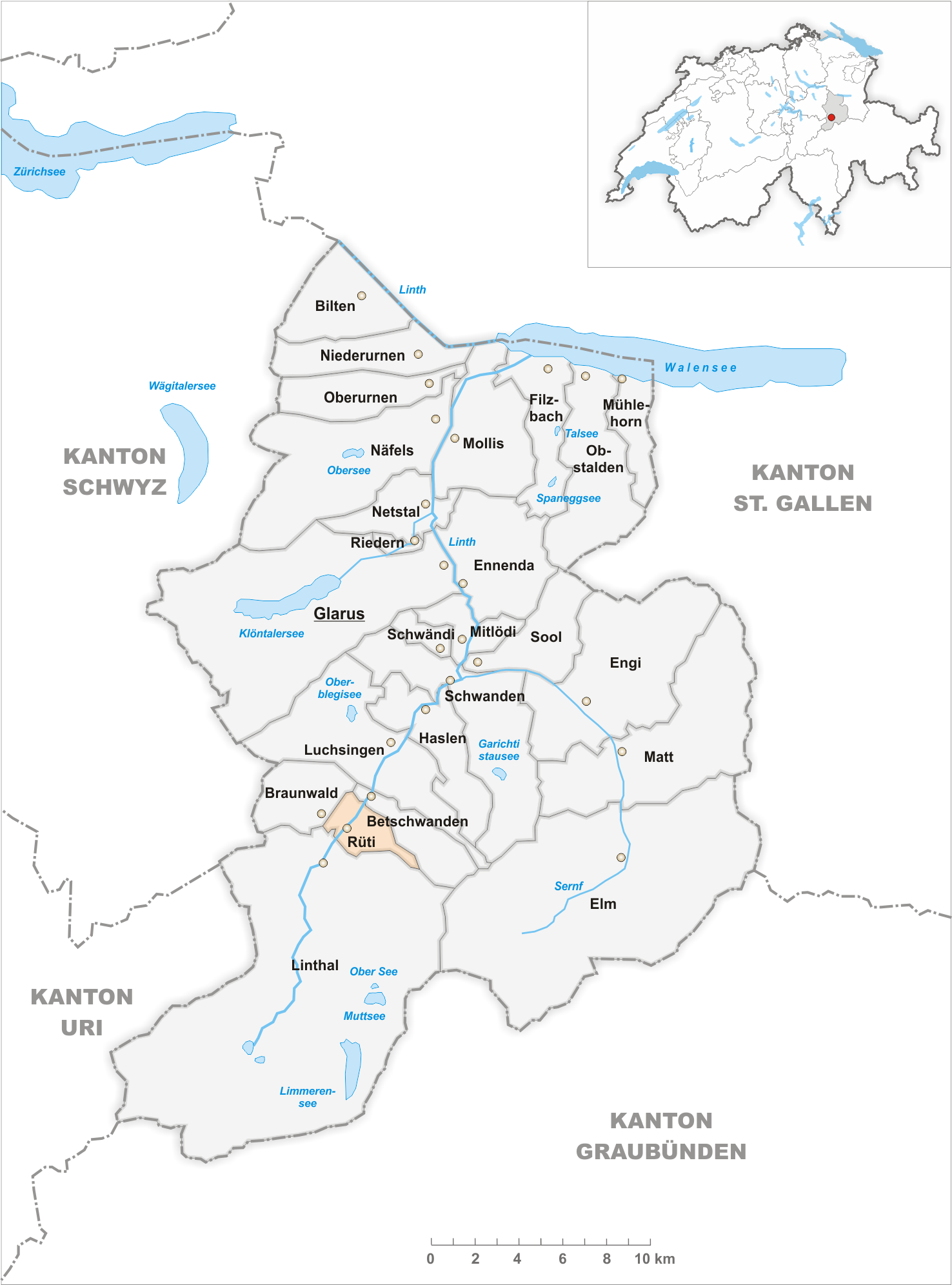
- The former municipal area
- Coordinates: 46°56′11″N 9°00′56″E
- Country: Switzerland
- Canton: Glarus
- Municipality: Glarus Süd

Area
  - Total: 6.18 km^{2} (2.39 sq mi)
- Elevation: 620 m (2,030 ft)

Population (December 2020)
  - Total: 364
  - Density: 58.9/km^{2} (153/sq mi)

Rüti is a village, and former municipality, in the municipality of Glarus Süd and canton of Glarus in Switzerland.

== History ==
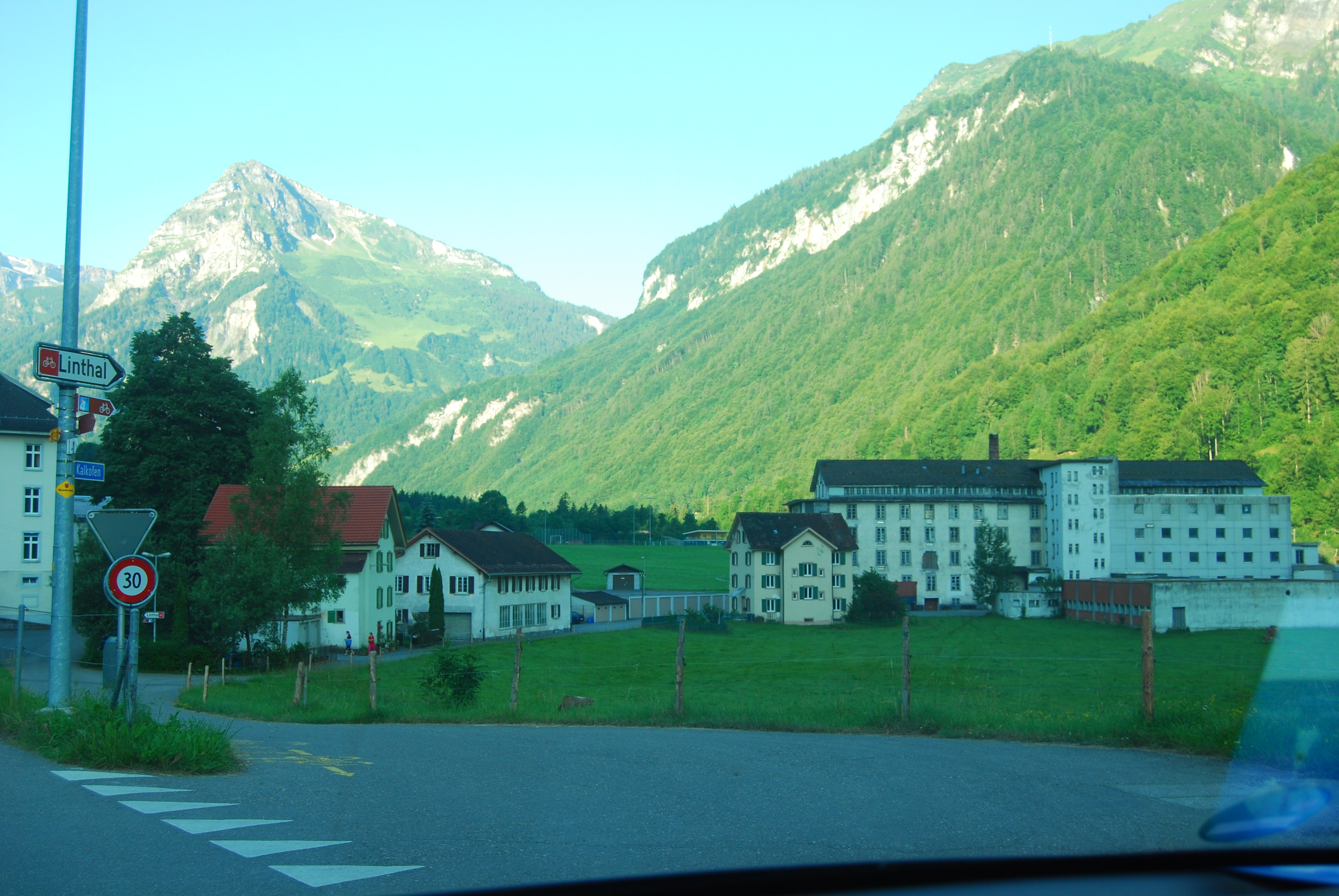
Rüti, with one of the textile mills

Rüti is first mentioned about 1340.

Agriculture was the main industry in Rüti until the 19th century. However, by the 17th century, manual cotton spinning was widespread. By 1770 this had declined and the resulting impoverishment ended only with the establishment of a cotton mill for mechanical spinning and weaving of cotton in 1847, and a second similar plant for weaving both wool and cotton in 1850. These factories attracted many foreign workers to Rüti, but their operations ceased in 2002.

In 1879, Linthal was connected to the Swiss railway network by the opening of the Swiss Northeastern Railway line from Weesen to Linthal.

Until 1939, the village of Braunwald formed part of the municipality of Rüti, but in that year it split off to form its own municipality. On 1 January 2011, both municipalities was reunited as part of the new municipality of Glarus Süd.

== Geography ==
Rüti is located in the valley of the Linth river, with the village situated on the east bank of the river at an elevation of approximately 620 m (2,030 ft). The village of Linthal lies to the south, the village of Betschwanden is to the north, whilst the resort village of Braunwald lies on a terrace some 600 m (2,000 ft) above the western side of the valley.

The former municipal boundaries of Rüti, as of 2006, encompassed an area of 6.2 km^{2} (2.4 sq mi). Of this area, 23.9% is used for agricultural purposes, while 57.3% is forested. Of the rest of the land, 4.9% is settled (buildings or roads) and the remainder (13.9%) is non-productive (rivers, glaciers or mountains).

== Transport ==
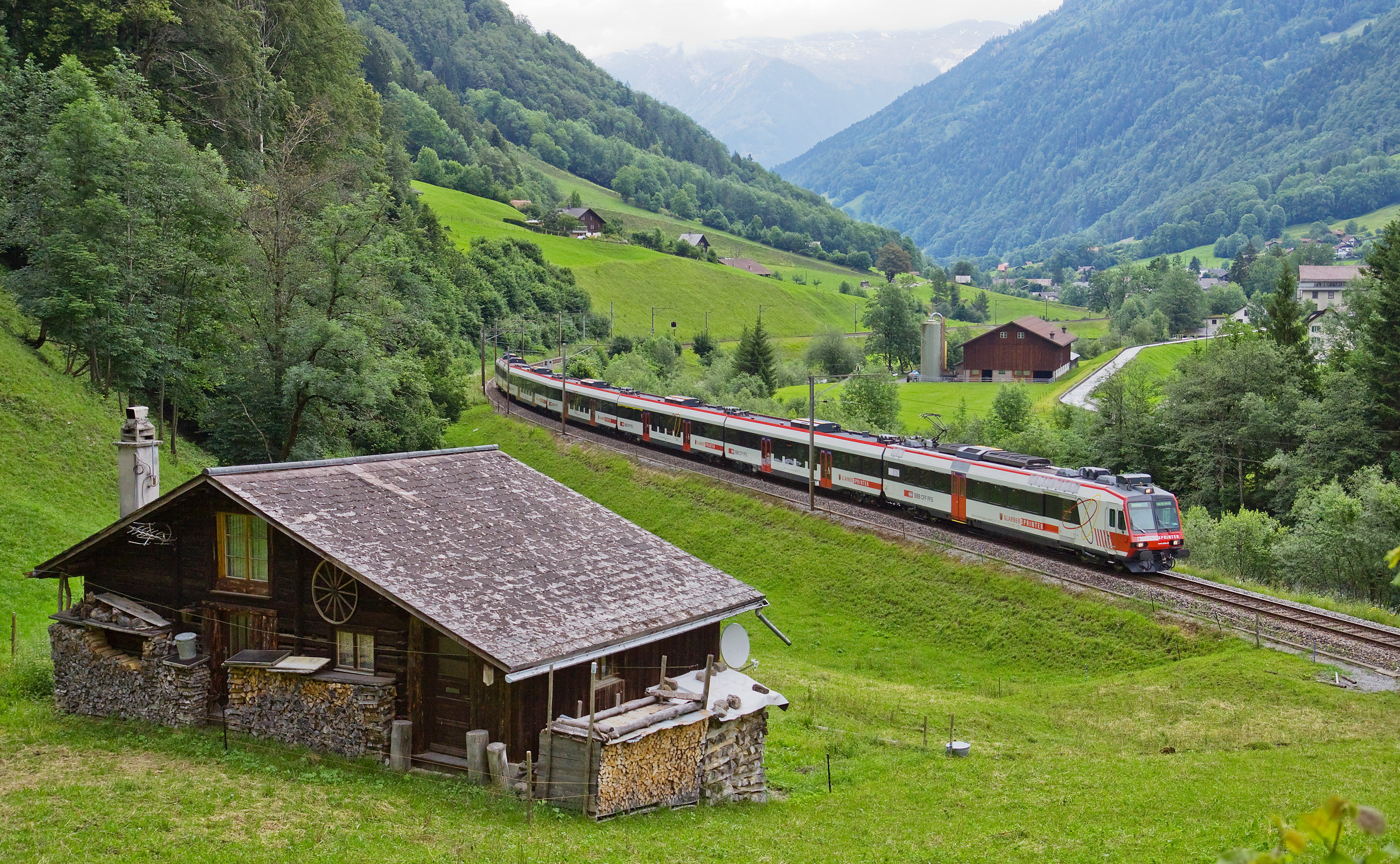
Glarner Sprinter service between Linthal and Rüti

Rüti is located on the Hauptstrasse 17, which runs the length of the canton of Glarus before climbing the Klausen Pass into the canton of Uri, as well as on the Weesen to Linthal railway line that parallels the main road and the Linth river through Glarus. The high alpine Klausen Pass is normally only open to traffic between June and September, and for the rest of the year the road and railway up the valley form the only access to the village. The village is served by Rüti GL railway station, which is served by the hourly Zürich S-Bahn service S25 between Linthal and Zürich.

== Demographics ==
Rüti has a population, as of 31 December 2020 and as defined by the former municipal area, of 364. As of 2007, 12.1% of the population was made up of foreign nationals. Over the last 10 years the population has decreased at a rate of -31.4%. Most of the population (as of 2000) speaks German (75.7%), with Serbo-Croatian being second most common ( 8.1%) and Italian being third ( 4.1%).

In the 2007 federal election the most popular party was the SPS which received 55.6% of the vote. Most of the rest of the votes went to the SVP with 32.3% of the vote.

The entire Swiss population is generally well educated. In Rüti about 55.1% of the population (between age 25-64) have completed either non-mandatory upper secondary education or additional higher education (either University or a Fachhochschule).

Rüti has an unemployment rate of 1.86%. As of 2005, there were 21 people employed in the primary economic sector and about 8 businesses involved in this sector. 14 people are employed in the secondary sector and there are 2 businesses in this sector. 11 people are employed in the tertiary sector, with 6 businesses in this sector.

The historical population is given in the following table:

year	population
1692	256
1837	814
1850	809
1900	919
1950	821
2000	444
