= Mitlödi =

- Village (and former municipality)
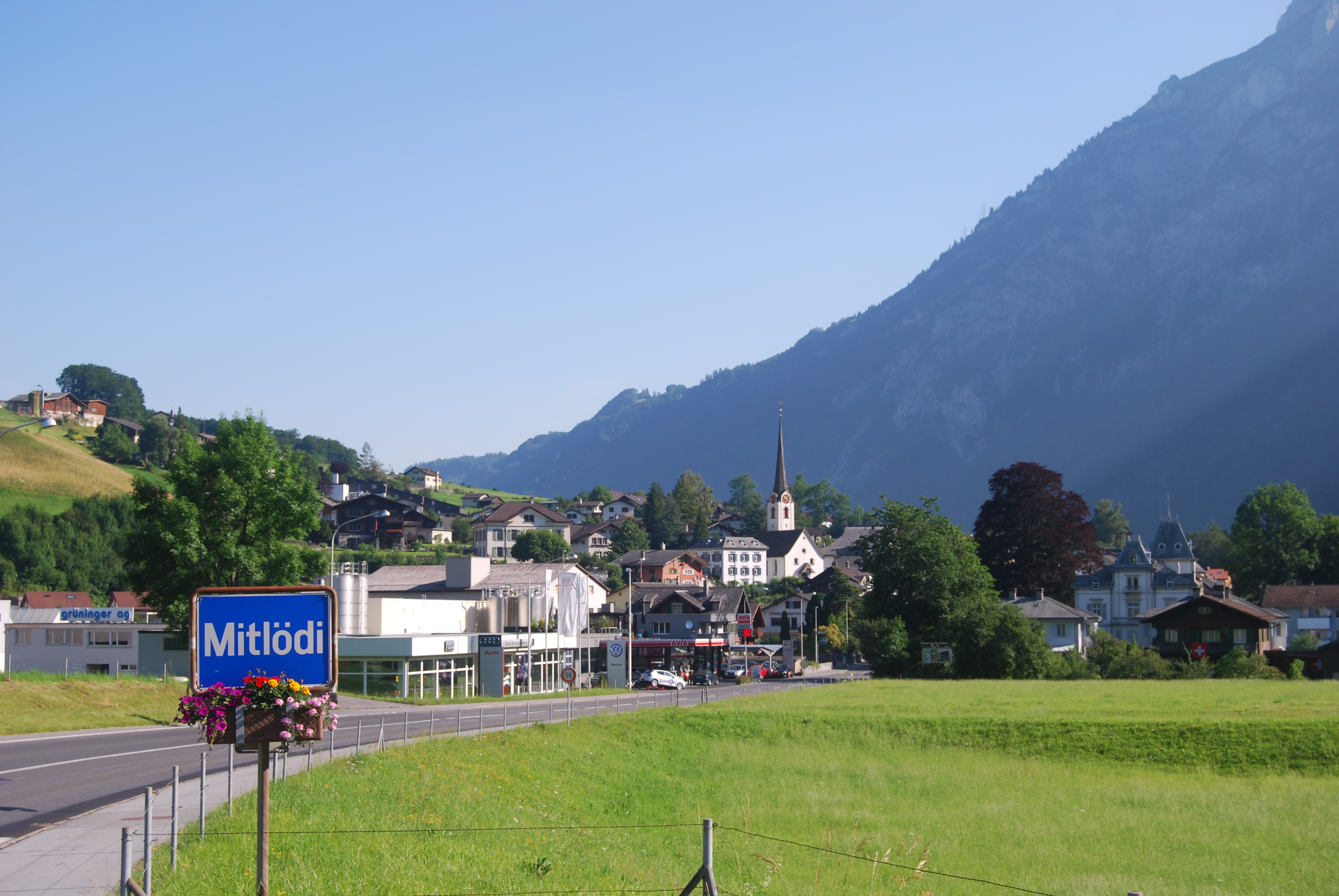

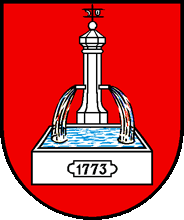
- Coat of arms

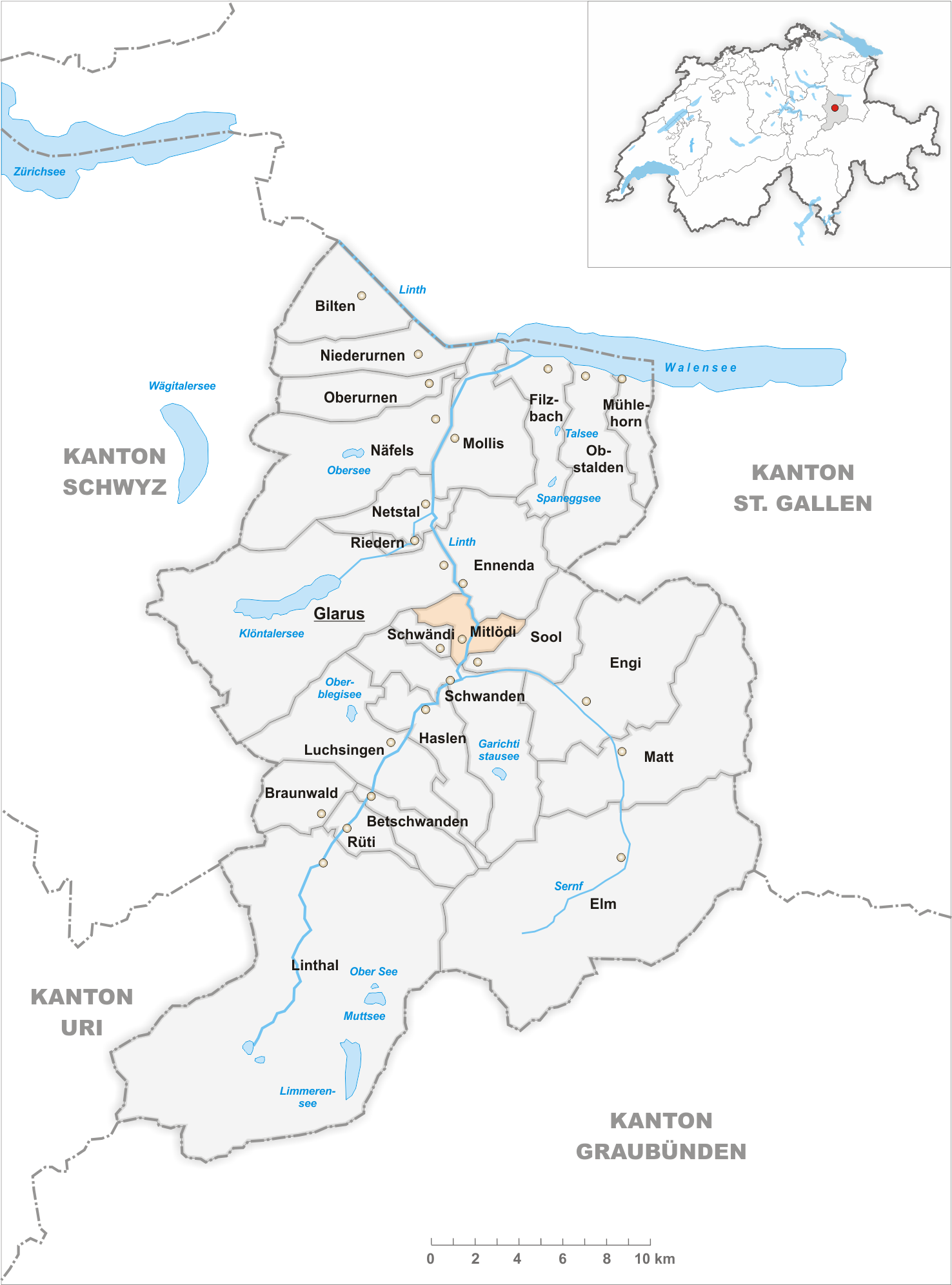
- The former municipal area (2007)
- Coordinates: 47°0′37″N 9°4′47″E
- Country: Switzerland
- Canton: Glarus
- Municipality: Glarus Süd

Area
  - Total: 6.25 km^{2} (2.41 sq mi)
- Elevation: 504 m (1,654 ft)

Population (December 2020)
  - Total: 1,000
  - Density: 160/km^{2} (410/sq mi)

Mitlödi is a village and former municipality, in the municipality of Glarus Süd and canton of Glarus in Switzerland.

== History ==
Mitlödi is first mentioned in 1320 as Mitlodi. The coat of arms was officially adopted in 1939. It displays a silver fountain, the so-called "Schäflibrunnen", which is located in front of the church and was erected in the village in 1773.

In 1879, Mitlödi was connected to the Swiss railway network by the opening of the Swiss Northeastern Railway line from Weesen.

On 1 January 2011, Mitlödi became part of the municipality of Glarus Süd.

== Geography ==
Aerial view by Walter Mittelholzer (1918-1937)

Mitlödi is located in the valley of the Linth river, on a pre-historic rock slide, at an elevation of 504 m (1,654 ft). It consists of the village of Mitlödi itself, and the separate section of Ennetlinth on the right bank of the Linth. The village of Schwanden lies upstream and to the south, whilst the town of Glarus is downstream and to the north.

Mitlödi has an area, as defined by the former municipal boundaries in 2006, of 6.2 km^{2} (2.4 sq mi). Of this area, 32.1% is used for agricultural purposes, while 56.1% is forested. Of the rest of the land, 7.4% is settled (buildings or roads) and the remainder (4.5%) is non-productive (rivers, glaciers or mountains).

== Transport ==
Mitlödi is located on the Hauptstrasse 17, which runs the length of the canton of Glarus before climbing the Klausen Pass into the canton of Uri, as well as on the Weesen to Linthal railway line that parallels the main road and the Linth river through Glarus. The high alpine Klausen Pass is normally only open to traffic between June and September, and for the rest of the year the road and railway up the Linth valley form the only access to Mitlödi.

Mitlödi railway station is served by the Zürich S-Bahn service S25 between Linthal and Zürich, and by the St. Gallen S-Bahn service S6 between Rapperswil and Schwanden. As of the December 2023 timetable change, both services operate once per hour, combining to provide two trains per hour between Ziegelbrücke and Schwanden.

== Demographics ==
Mitlödi has a population (as of 31 December 2020) of 1,000. As of 2007, 22.5% of the population was made up of foreign nationals. Over the last 10 years the population has decreased at a rate of -4.9%. Most of the population (as of 2000) speaks German (84.0%), with Italian being second most common (5.4%) and Spanish being third (4.9%).

In the 2007 federal election the most popular party was the SPS which received 49.7% of the vote. Most of the rest of the votes went to the SVP with 30.9% of the vote.

The entire Swiss population is generally well educated. In Mitlödi about 63.7% of the population (between age 25–64) have completed either non-mandatory upper secondary education or additional higher education (either University or a Fachhochschule).

Mitlödi has an unemployment rate of 1.7%. As of 2005, there were 31 people employed in the primary economic sector and about 15 businesses involved in this sector. 398 people are employed in the secondary sector and there are 21 businesses in this sector. 144 people are employed in the tertiary sector, with 41 businesses in this sector.

The historical population is given in the following table:

year	population
1777	183 (adult males)
1850	649
1900	736
1950	821
2000	1,030
2020	1,033
