= Rüti GL railway station =

Railway station in Switzerland

Rüti GL
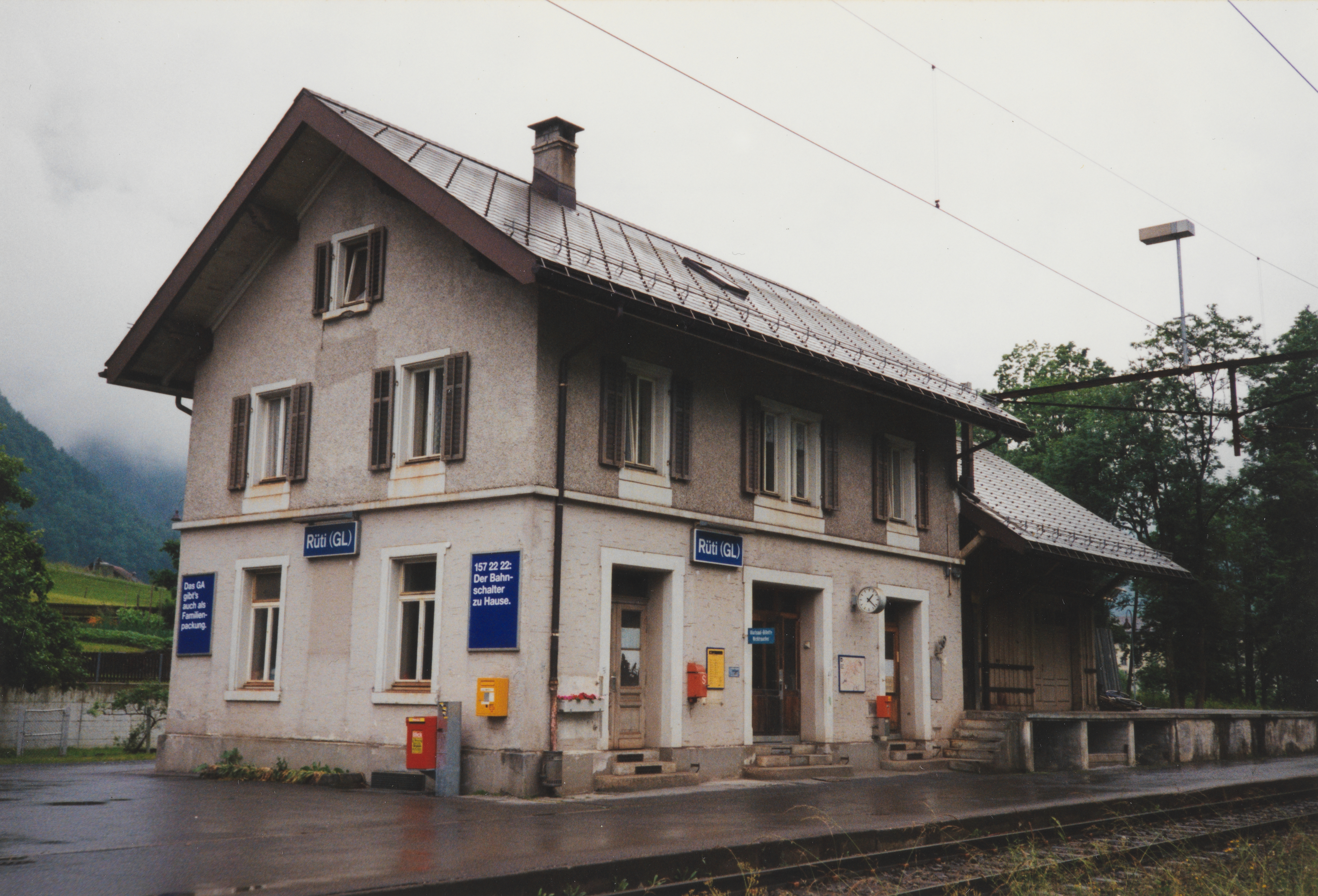
- Rüti GL railway station

General information
- Location: Dorfstrasse; Rüti; Glarus Süd, Glarus; Switzerland
- Coordinates: 46.934448°N 9.012936°E
- Elevation: 625 m (2,051 ft)
- Owner: Swiss Federal Railways
- Operator: Swiss Federal Railways
- Line: Weesen-Linthal

Services
Preceding station	Zurich S-Bahn	Following station
Diesbach-Betschwanden towards Zürich HB	S25	Linthal Braunwaldbahn towards Linthal
Location
- Location within Switzerland

Rüti GL railway station (German: Bahnhof Rüti GL) is a railway station serving the village of Rüti in the municipality of Glarus Süd in the Swiss canton of Glarus (abbreviated to GL).The station is situated on the Weesen to Linthal railway line, and served by the hourly Zürich S-Bahn service S25 between Zurich and Linthal.

== Services ==
As of the December 2023 timetable change, the following services call at Rüti GL:

- St. Gallen S-Bahn:
  - S6: hourly service between Linthal and Rapperswil via Ziegelbrücke (only during off-peak hours).
- Zürich S-Bahn:
  - S25: hourly service between Linthal and Zürich HB via Ziegelbrücke.
