= Eggstock (Schwyzer Alps) =

Mountain in Switzerland

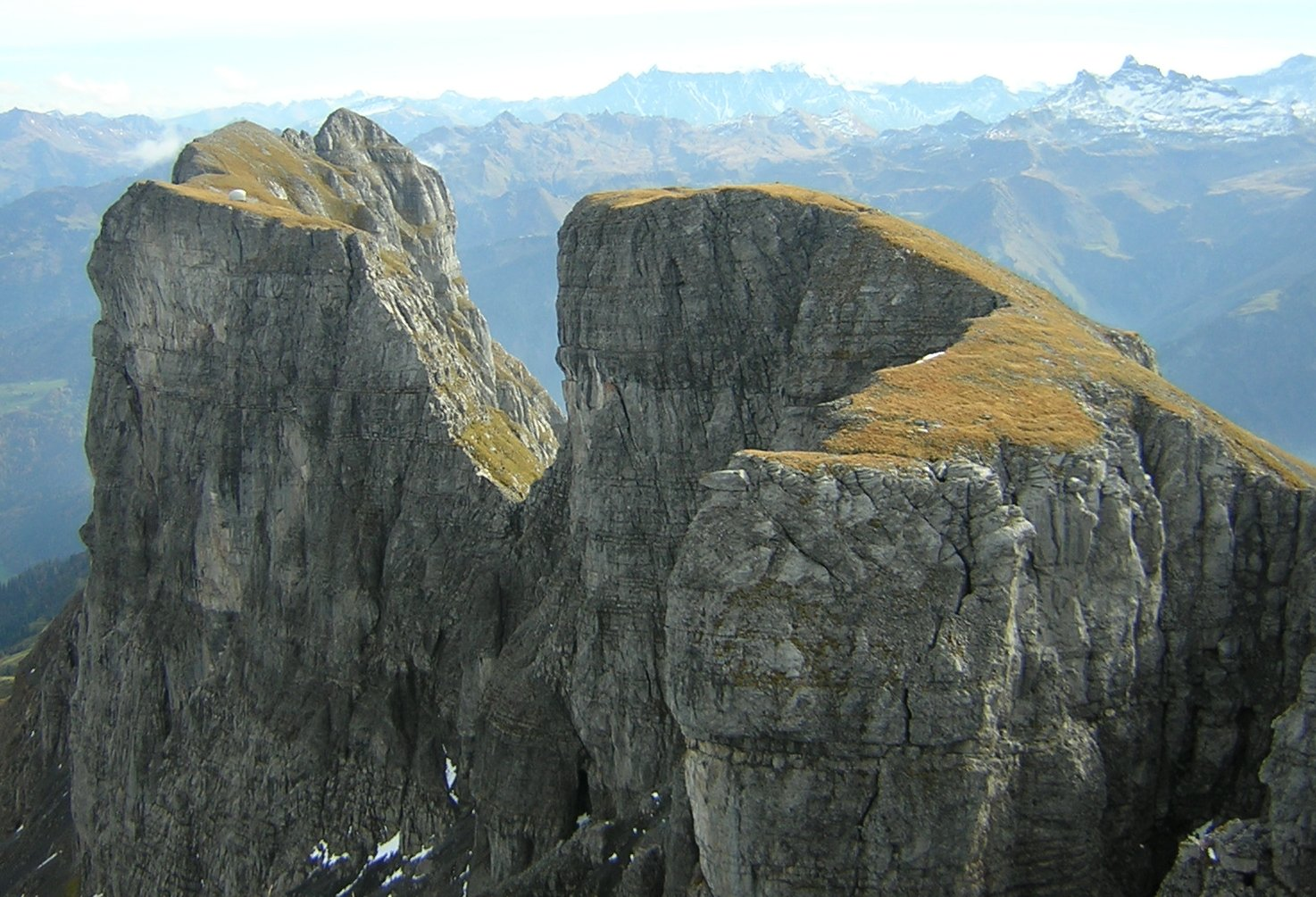
- View from the west side

Highest point
- Peak: Hinterer Eggstock
- Elevation: 2,455 m (8,054 ft)
- Prominence: 96 m (315 ft)
- Parent peak: Bös Fulen
- Coordinates: 46°57′37″N 8°58′0″E

Geography
- Location within Switzerland Location within Canton of Glarus Location within Canton of Schwyz
- Country: Switzerland
- Cantons: Glarus / Schwyz
- Parent range: Schwyzer Alps
- Topo map: Swiss Federal Office of Topography swisstopo

The Eggstock is a mountain of the Schwyzer Alps, located on the border between the Swiss cantons of Schwyz and Glarus, north of Braunwald. It lies on the range east of the Bös Fulen, between the valley of Bösbächi and the cirque of Braunwald and is composed of three summits: the Hinterer Eggstock (2,455 m [8,054 ft]), the Mittlerer Eggstock (2,436 m [7,992 ft]) and the Vorderer Eggstock (2,449 m [8,035 ft]).

== See also ==
- List of mountains of the canton of Glarus
- List of mountains of the canton of Schwyz
