= Hätzingen =

- Village (and former municipality)
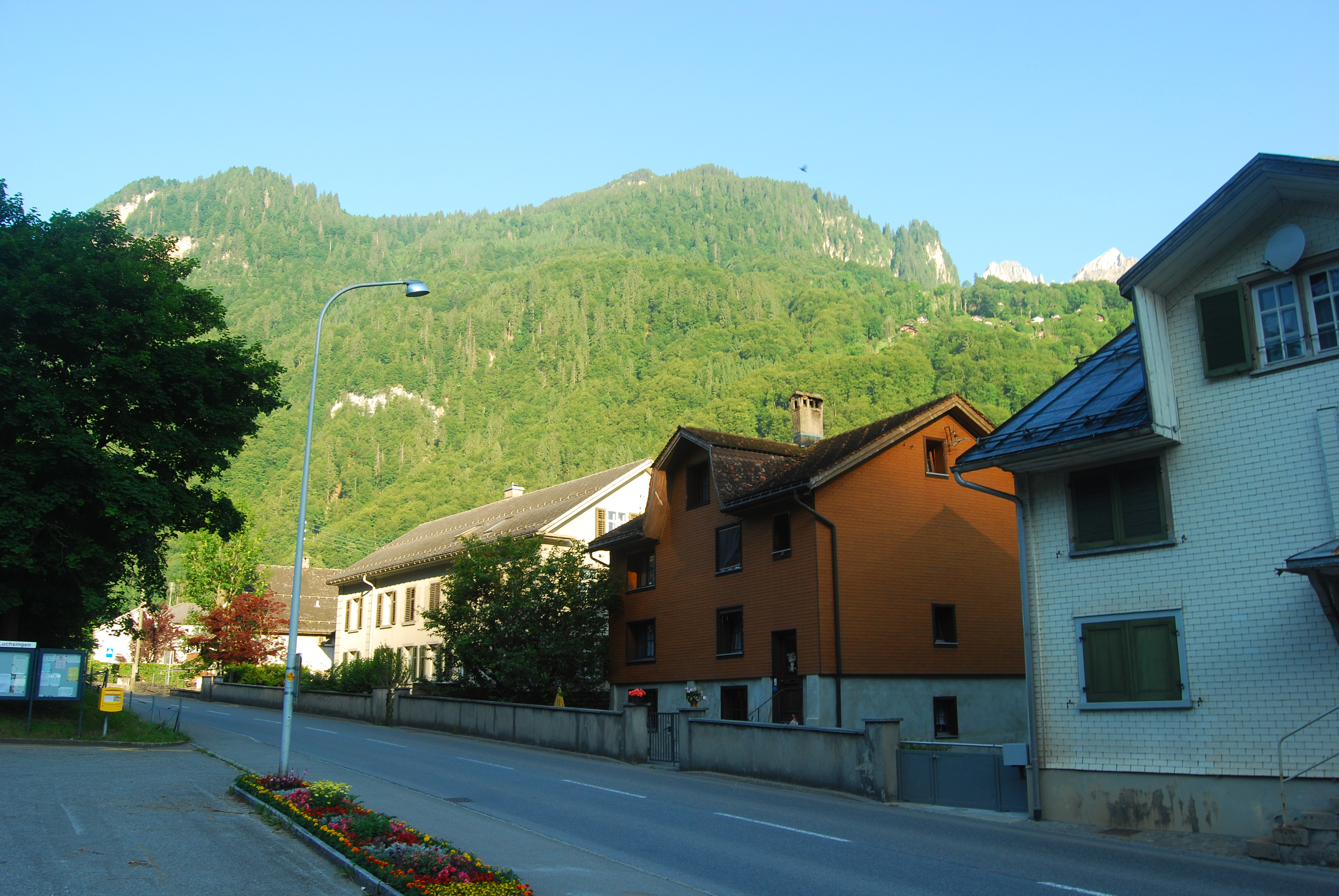

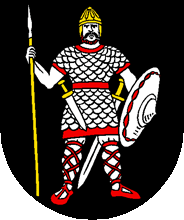
- Coat of arms

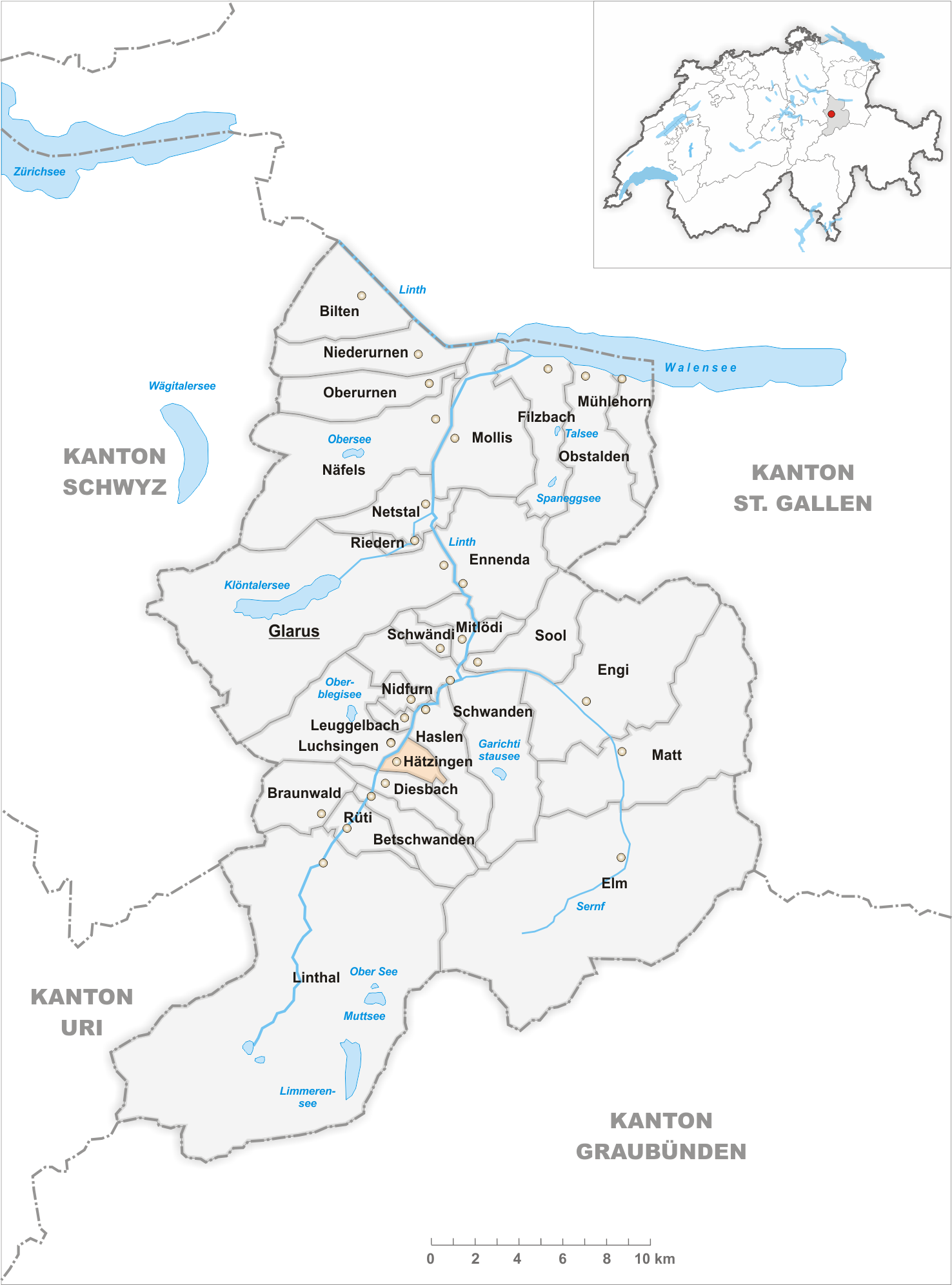
- The former municipal area (2003)
- Coordinates: 46°57′38″N 9°02′12″E
- Country: Switzerland
- Canton: Glarus
- Municipality: Glarus Süd
- Elevation: 583 m (1,913 ft)

Hätzingen is a village, and former municipality, in the municipality of Glarus Süd and canton of Glarus in Switzerland.

== History ==
Aerial view from 400 m by Walter Mittelholzer (1923)

Hätzingen is first recorded in 1350 as Hezzinge(n).

In 2004, the municipality of Hätzingen was merged into the municipality of Luchsingen. On 1 January 2011, the municipality of Luchsingen was itself merged into the new municipality of Glarus Süd.

== Geography ==
Hätzingen is located in the valley of the Linth river, with the village situated on the east bank of the river, at an elevation of approximately 583 m (1,913 ft). The village of Diesbach lies to the south. To the north, the next village is Luchsingen, which lies on the west bank of the river, and Haslen, on the east bank.

== Transport ==
Hätzingen is located on the Hauptstrasse 17, which runs the length of the canton of Glarus before climbing the Klausen Pass into the canton of Uri, as well as on the Weesen to Linthal railway line that parallels the main road and the Linth river through Glarus. The high alpine Klausen Pass is normally only open to traffic between June and September, and for the rest of the year the road and railway up the valley form the only access to the village. The village is served by Luchsingen-Hätzingen railway station, which is served by the hourly Zürich S-Bahn service S25 between Linthal and Zurich.

== Demographics ==
The historical population of Hätzingen is given in the following table:

year	population
1850	500
1900	653
1950	653
2000	341

== Notable people ==
In 1791, Thomas Johannessen Heftye (1767-1827) emigrated from Hätzingen to Norway, where he founded the Thos. Joh. Heftye & Søn bank. The Norwegian branch of the Heftye family included several notable businessmen and politicians, including Johannes Thomassen Heftye (1792–1856), Henrik Thomassen Heftye (1804–1864), Thomas Johannessen Heftye (1822–1886) and Thomas Thomassen Heftye (1860-1921).
