= Linth =

River in Switzerland

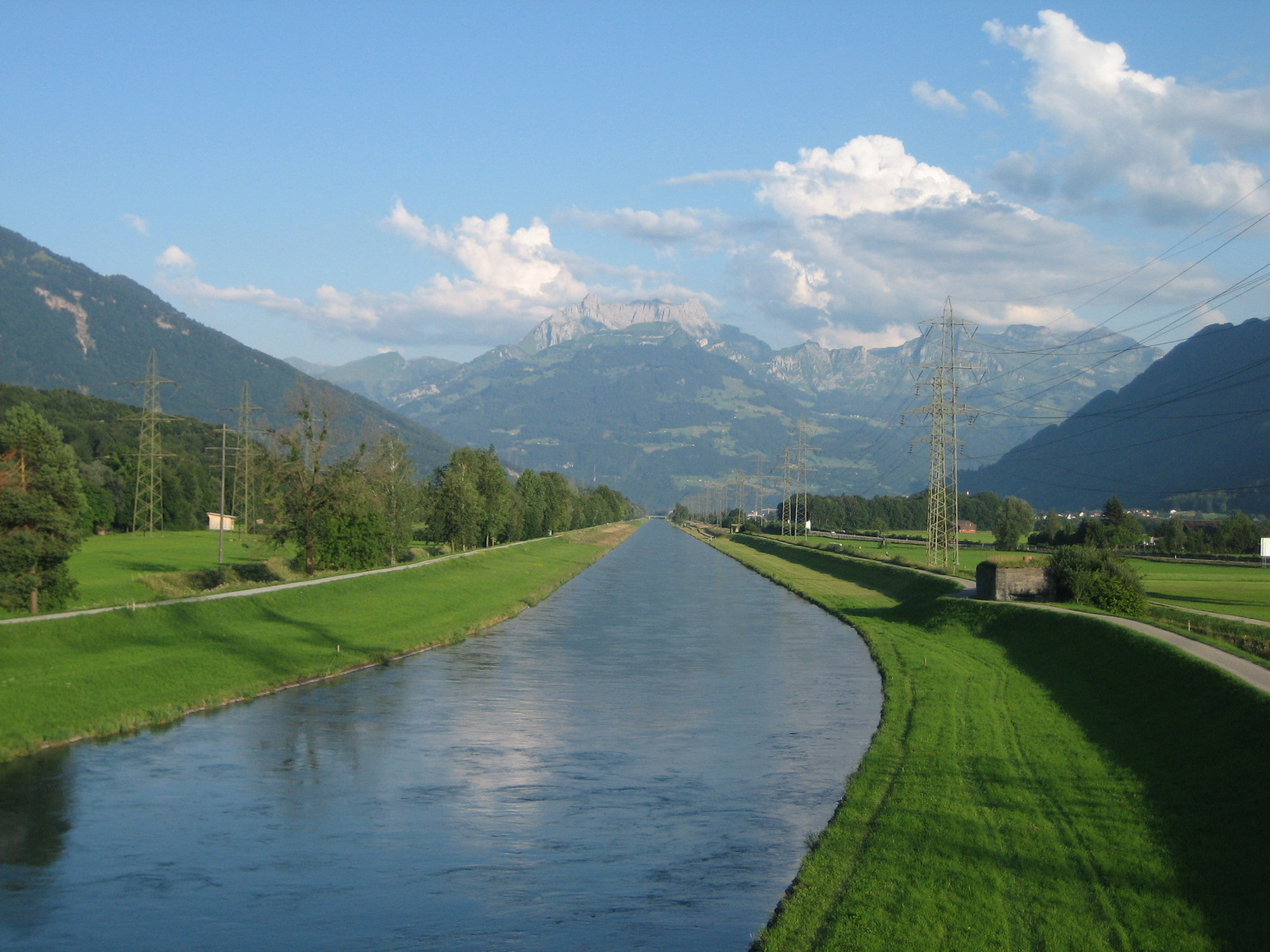
- The lower reaches of the Linth near Reichenburg

Location
- Country: Switzerland

Physical characteristics
- Source
  - location: Canton of Glarus, Switzerland
- Mouth
  - location: Lake Zurich (Obersee)
  - coordinates: 47.2183°N 8.9407°E
- Length: 50 km (31 mi)

Basin features
- Progression: Lake Zurich→ Limmat→ Aare→ Rhine→ North Sea

The Linth (pronounced [ˈlɪnt] "lint") is a Swiss river that rises near the village of Linthal in the mountains of the canton of Glarus, and eventually flows into the Obersee section of Lake Zurich. It is about 50 kilometres (31 mi) in length.

The water power of the Linth was a main factor in the creation of the textile industry of the canton Glarus, and is today used to drive the Linth–Limmern power stations in its upper reaches.

The river and its upper valley forms the boundary between the mountain ranges of the Glarus Alps, to its east and south, and the Schwyzer Alps, to its west. In its lower part, in the Linth plain (Linthebene), the Linth Canal forms the boundary between the cantons of Glarus and St. Gallen and part of the boundary between the cantons of St. Gallen and Schwyz.

The river lends its name to the former canton of Linth (1798–1803).

== Course of the river ==
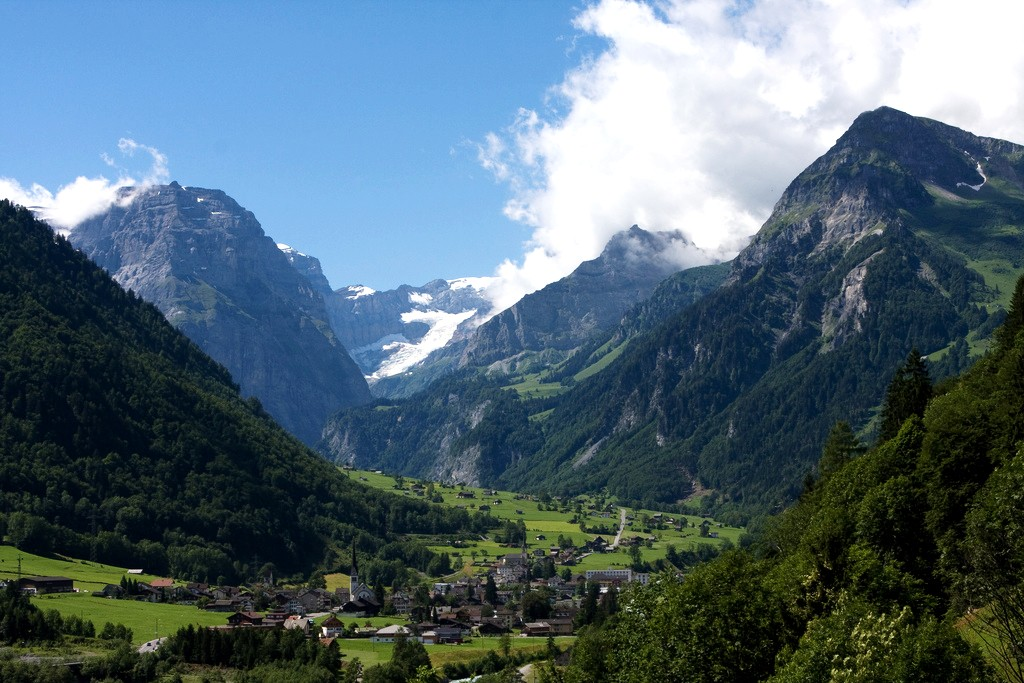
The upper part of the Linth valley, with the river just visible to the bottom, the village of Linthal above, and the Biferten glacier at the top centre

The river rises to the south-west of the village of Linthal, at the foot the Tödi mountain (elevation 3,614 metres or 11,857 feet). It collects the water from several glaciers, including the Clariden Glacier and the Biferten Glacier, as well as various tributary streams, including the Oberstafelbach, the Bifertenbach, the Sandbach, the Walenbach and the Limmerenbach. The last of these is dammed to create the Limmerensee, a part of the Linth–Limmern hydro-electric scheme.

The river then flows north to the village of Linthal, the highest significant settlement on the river, and onwards through the canton of Glarus villages of Rüti, Betschwanden, Diesbach, Hätzingen, Luchsingen, Leuggelbach, Haslen, Nidfurn and Schwanden. In Schwanden, the Linth is joined by one of its principal tributaries, the Sernf, which drains the south-eastern part of the canton of Glarus.

From Schwanden, the river continues to flow north through the villages of Mitlödi and Ennenda and the town of Glarus before reaching the village of Netstal. In Netstal, the Linth is joined by the Löntsch, which drains the Klöntalersee. The Linth then flows between the villages Näfels and Mollis, from where it formerly flowed in a northerly direction to a confluence with its tributary outfall from Lake Walen (Walensee) on the Linth Plain, and then across that plain in a westerly direction to its mouth at the head of the Obersee section of Lake Zurich.

As a result of the river regulation works (see below), the river is today diverted down an artificial channel in an easterly direction into Lake Walen. Another artificial channel (the Linth Channel) then takes the outfall of Lake Walen at Weesen and flows west through the Linth Plain and into the Obersee.

== River regulation of the Linth ==
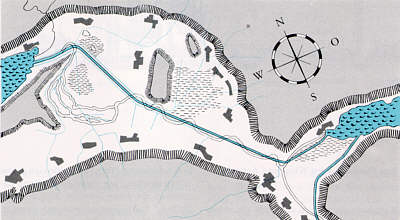
Conrad Escher's plan of the correction

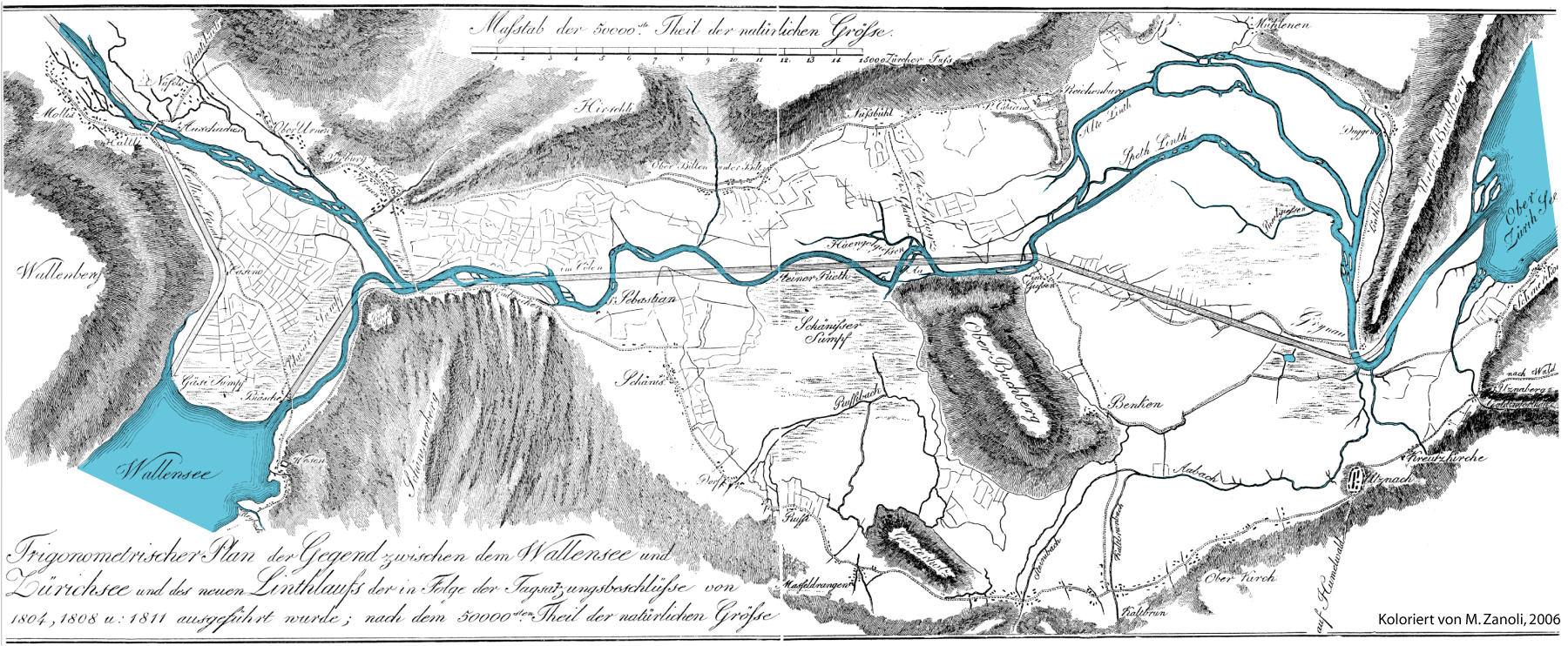
The plain of the Linth between Weesen and Schmerikon before and after the correction of the Linth, 1811

The taming of the Linth (German: Linthkorrektur) from 1807 to 1823 was one of the great engineering feats of the early 19th century, the earliest project of such a size undertaken by the new Swiss state, and a great example of solidarity in early Switzerland.

In the second half of the 18th century, the situation of the population in the lower Glarus valley, the Linth Plain and around Lake Walen, was pretty disastrous: cutting down the woods of the Glarus valley during early industrialization led to more and more gravel coming down with the yearly spring high water which was deposited at the joining of Linth and Maag, the outflow of the Lake Walen, in the plain between Lake Walen and Lake Zurich. This caused frequent floodings and backing up of water which made the level of Lake Walen rise several meters and turned the whole countryside into swamps. Agriculture became more and more difficult, the poverty increased, and diseases like tuberculosis and malaria were rampant.

The statesman, scientist, painter and manager Conrad Escher (later named "von der Linth") from Zurich developed and executed the plan of channeling the Linth into Lake Walen, where the gravel could be deposited without damage. A second channel, the Linth Channel, connected the lakes of Walen and Zurich, replacing the former Maag.

The river regulation put an end to the floodings, lowered the level of Lake Walen by some 5.4 meters which greatly improved living conditions for the population, and dried up the swamps, resulting in 20 km^{2} arable land in the Linth plain.

== See also ==
- List of rivers of Switzerland
