= Matt, Switzerland =

Matt
- Village (and former municipality)
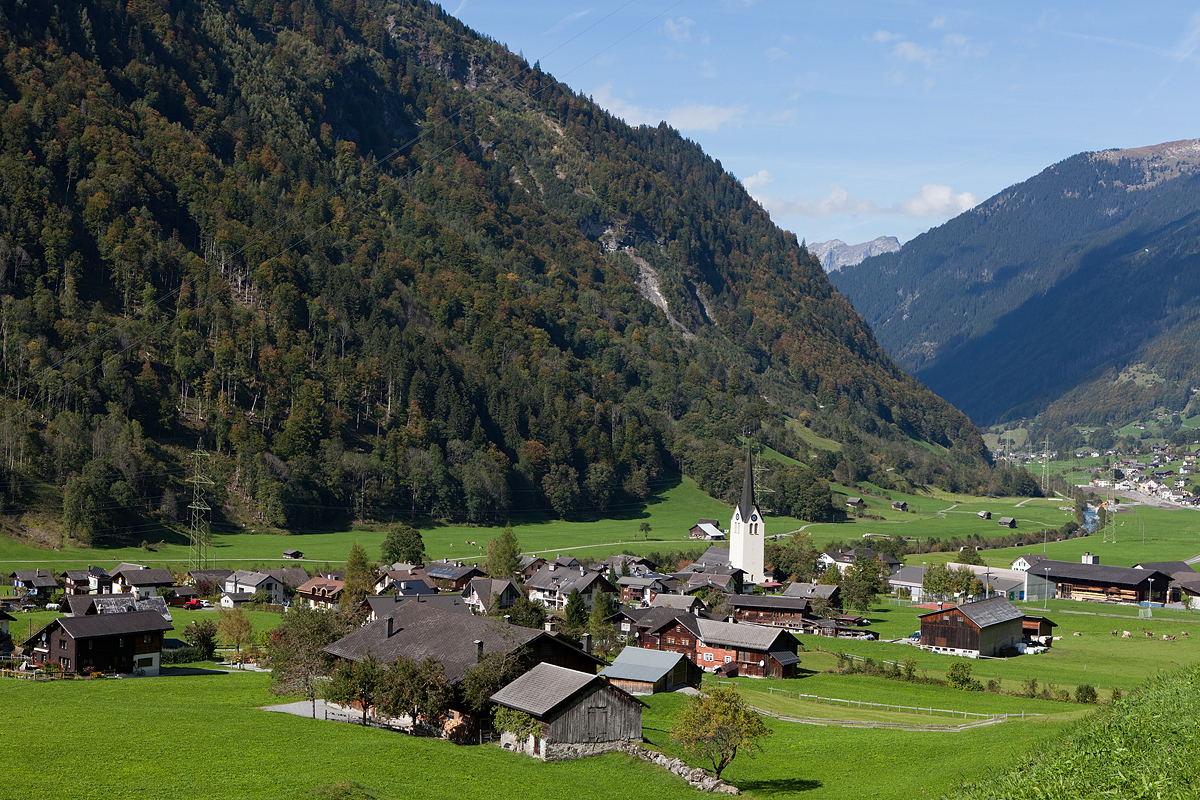

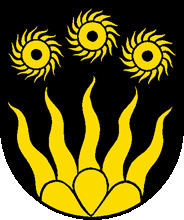
- Coat of arms

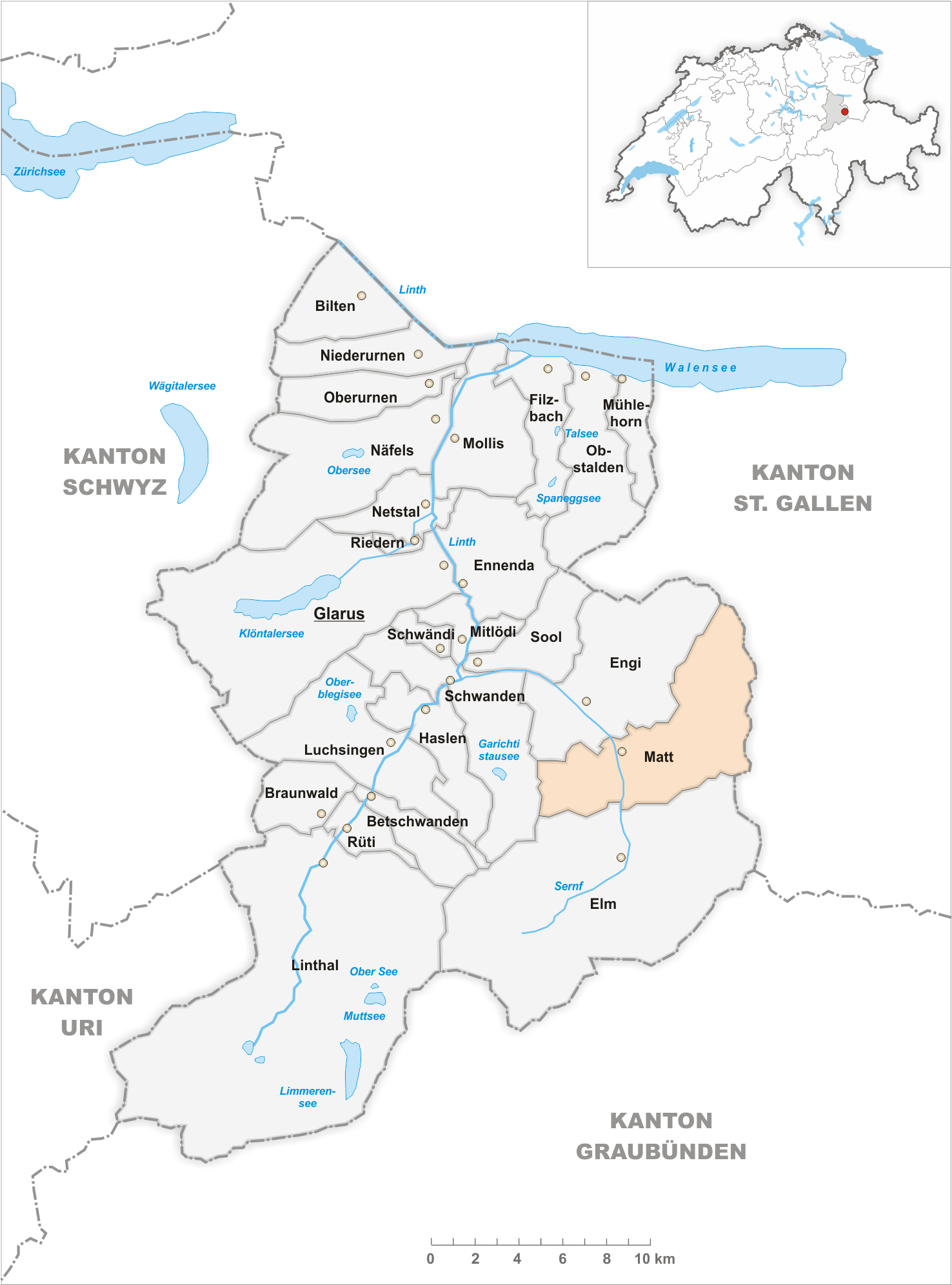
- The former municipal area (2007)
- Coordinates: 46°58′N 9°10′E
- Country: Switzerland
- Canton: Glarus
- Municipality: Glarus Süd

Area
  - Total: 41.27 km^{2} (15.93 sq mi)
- Elevation: 831 m (2,726 ft)

Population (December 2020)
  - Total: 361
  - Density: 8.75/km^{2} (22.7/sq mi)

Matt is a village, and former municipality, in the municipality of Glarus Süd and canton of Glarus in Switzerland. Matt lies in the valley of the Sernf river, and consists of the village of Matt itself, and the mountain hamlet of Weissenberge.

== History ==
Aerial view by Walter Mittelholzer (1923)

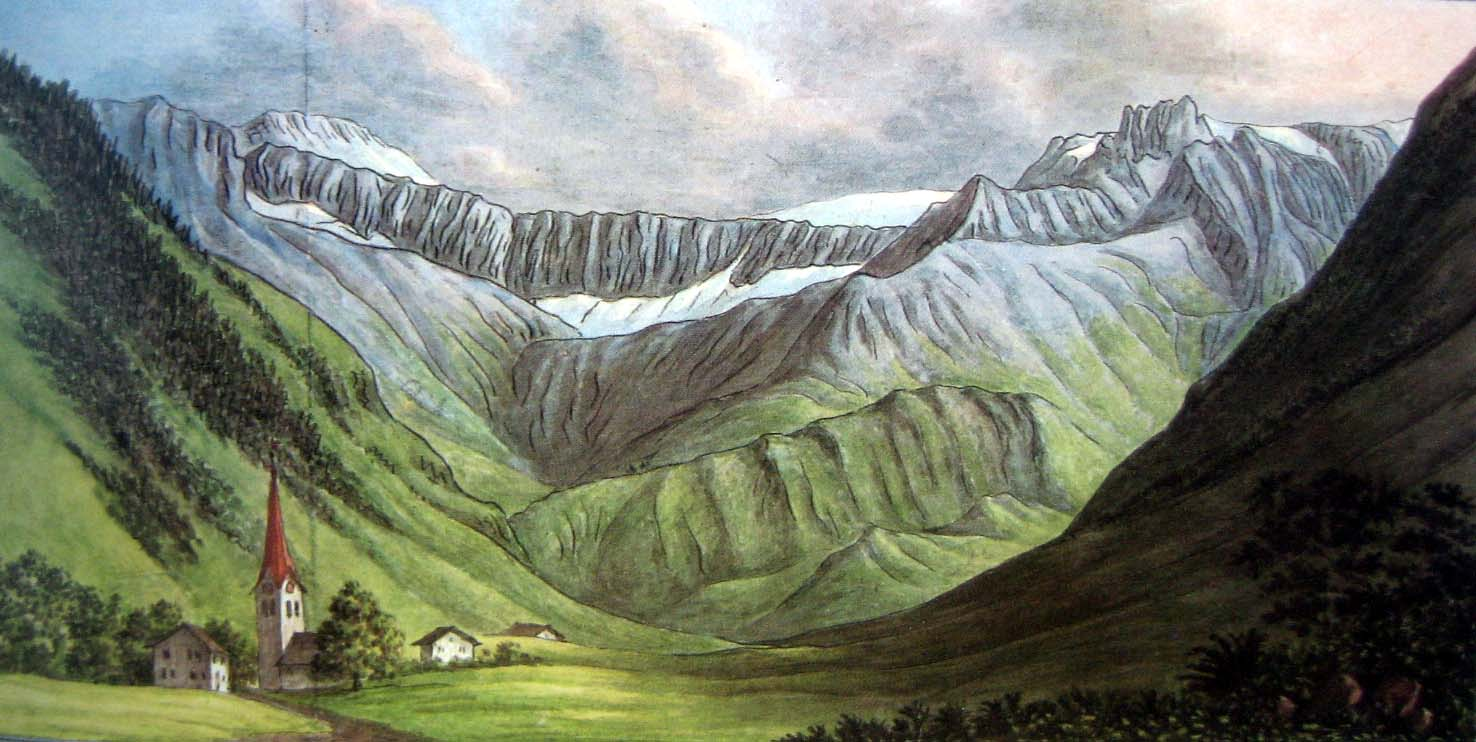
Matt im Sernftal 13. Juli 1811, by Hans Conrad Escher von der Linth

Matt is first mentioned in 1273 as Mattun.

In 1879, the valley of the Linth river was connected to the Swiss railway network by the opening of the Swiss Northeastern Railway line from Weesen, but Matt, in the side-valley of the Sernf river, remained unserved. This impacted the local economy, and various proposals were brought forward to provide rail service to the Sernf valley. Eventually, on 8 July 1905, the Sernftal tramway, a metre gauge roadside electric tramway, was opened connecting Schwanden with Matt and other communities as far as Elm. Service on this line continued until 31 May 1969, when it was replaced by road services. In 1967, a cable car was opened to link Matt and Weissenberge.

On 1 January 2011, Matt became part of the new municipality of Glarus Süd.

== Geography ==
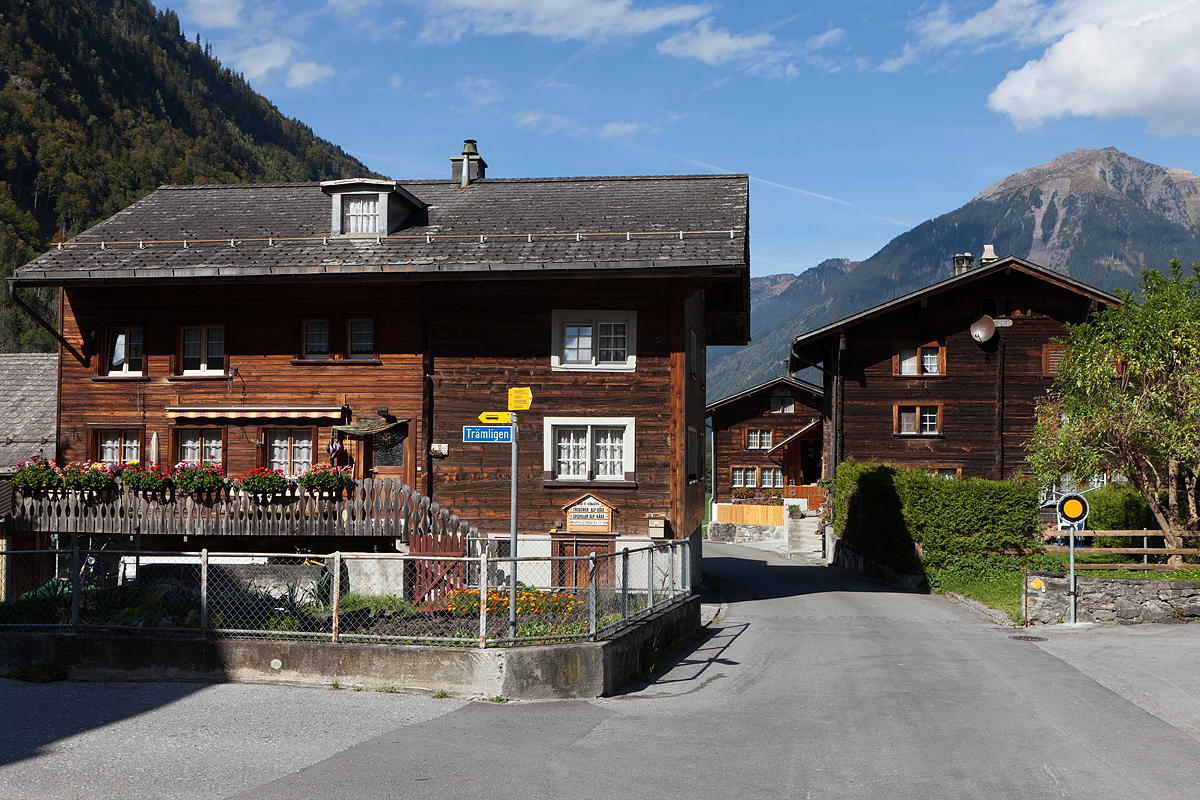
The village

The village of Matt is situated at an elevation of 831 m (2,726 ft) on the right bank of the Sernf river, whilst the hamlet of Weissenberge is located on the eastern slopes above Matt at an elevation of 1,266 m (4,154 ft). Matt is located on and near the road between Schwanden and Elm. The village of Engi lies downstream and to the north, whilst the village of Elm lies upstream and to the south. The Krauch stream flows into the Sernf river near the village.

Matt has an area, as defined by the former municipal boundaries in 2006, of 41.3 km^{2} (15.9 sq mi), covering a considerable area on each side of the river. Tho the east, this area reaches up to the peaks of the Gulderstock (2,511 m or 8,238 ft), Spitzmeilen (2,501 m or 8,205 ft), Wissgandstöckli (2,488 m or 8,163 ft) and Foostock (2,611 m or 8,566 ft), and includes the valley of the Krauch stream. To the west, the land rises up to the Bergligrat (2,428 m or 7,966 ft). Of the total area, 39.6% is used for agricultural purposes, while 32.4% is forested. Of the rest of the land, 0.8% is settled (buildings or roads) and the remainder (27.2%) is non-productive (rivers, glaciers or mountains).

The Riseten Pass links Matt, via the valley of the Krauch stream, with the village of Weisstannen in the canton of St. Gallen. The pass carries a hiking trail and crosses between the peaks of Wissgandstöckli and Foostock at an elevation of 2,189 m (7,182 ft).

== Transport ==
The Sernftalbus operates an hourly bus service linking Matt with Schwanden railway station, Elm, and other communities in the valley of the Sernf river between them. The service replaces the Sernftal tramway that operated between 1905 and 1969, over a similar route. At Schwanden railway station, a connecting railway service runs to the capital of the canton of Glarus, the town of Glarus.

A cable car links Matt with Weissenberge.

== Demographics ==
Matt has a population (as of 31 December 2020) of 361. As of 2007, 3.3% of the population was made up of foreign nationals. Over the last 10 years the population has decreased at a rate of -13.4%. Most of the population (as of 2000) speaks German (93.2%), with Albanian being second most common ( 3.7%) and Italian being third ( 1.3%).

In the 2007 federal election the most popular party was the SVP which received 48.6% of the vote. Most of the rest of the votes went to the SPS with 45.8% of the vote.

In Matt about 70.2% of the population (between age 25-64) have completed either non-mandatory upper secondary education or additional higher education (either University or a Fachhochschule).

Matt has an unemployment rate of 0.94%. As of 2005, there were 46 people employed in the primary economic sector and about 19 businesses involved in this sector. 87 people are employed in the secondary sector and there are 5 businesses in this sector. 39 people are employed in the tertiary sector, with 11 businesses in this sector.

The historical population is given in the following table:

year	population
1777	257
1850	659
1900	690
1950	622
2000	381
