= Kärpf =

Mountain in Switzerland

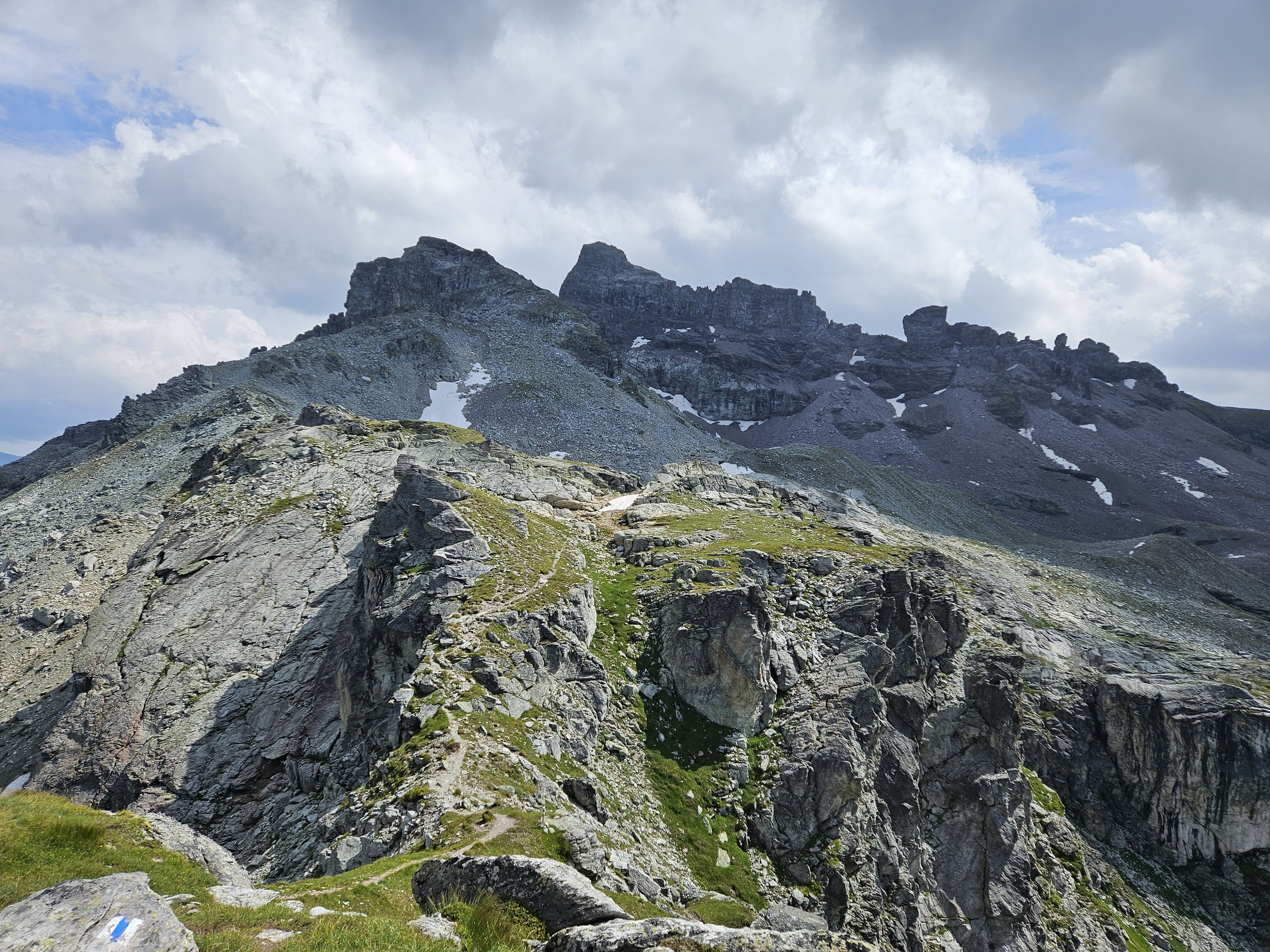

Highest point
- Elevation: 2,794 m (9,167 ft)
- Prominence: 533 m (1,749 ft)
- Parent peak: Tödi
- Coordinates: 46°55′0.4″N 9°5′35.3″E

Geography
- Location within Switzerland Location within Canton of Glarus
- Country: Switzerland
- Canton: Glarus
- Parent range: Glarus Alps

The Kärpf, or Chärpf, is a mountain in the Glarus Alps, at an elevation of 2,794 m (9,167 ft). Administratively, the mountain lies in the municipality of Glarus Süd, in the canton of Glarus, Switzerland.

The Kärpf is the highest point of the massif lying north of Richetli Pass (2,261 m or 7,418 ft). This range separates the two main valleys of Glarus: the main Linth valley with the village of Linthal on the west and the Sernftal with the village of Elm on the east.

On the north side of the Kärpf there is a small valley, which is occupied by a lake, the Garichtisee.

== See also ==
- List of mountains of the canton of Glarus
