= Engi, Switzerland =

Engi
- Village (and former municipality)
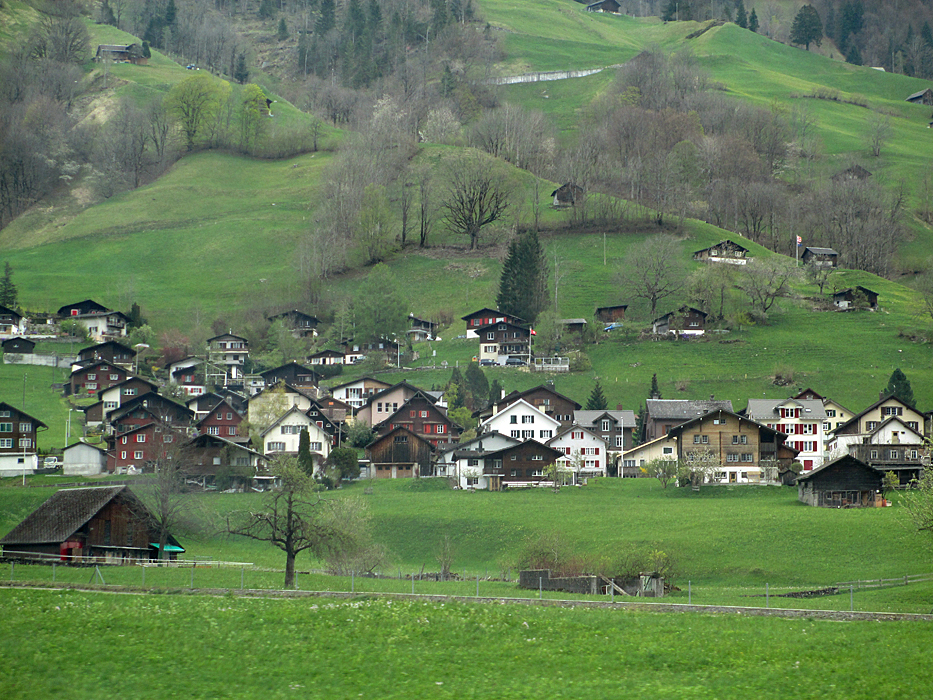

- Coat of arms

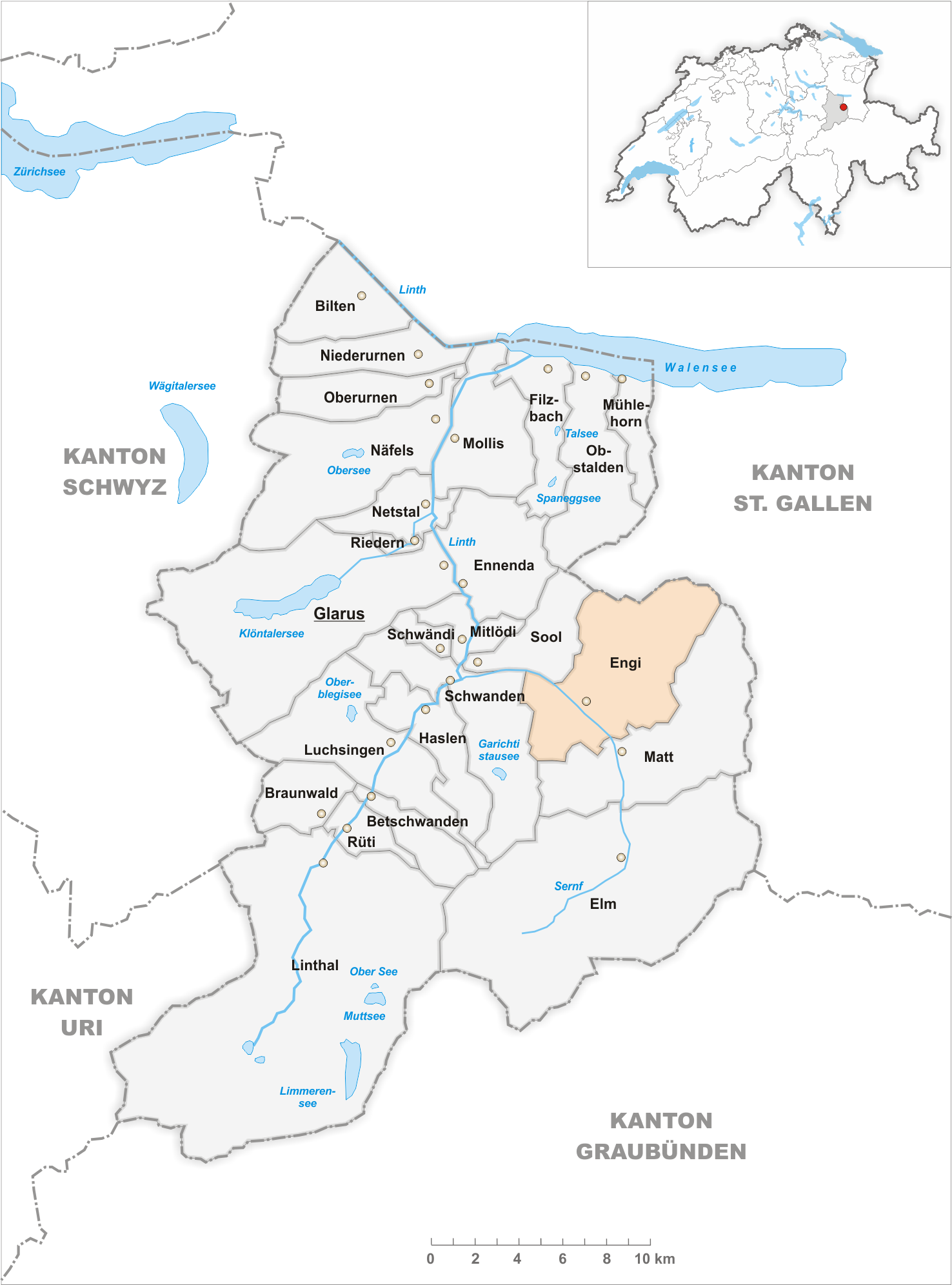
- The former municipal area (2007)
- Coordinates: 46°59′N 9°9′E
- Country: Switzerland
- Canton: Glarus
- Municipality: Glarus Süd

Area
  - Total: 40.7 km^{2} (15.7 sq mi)
- Elevation: 812 m (2,664 ft)

Population (December 2020)
  - Total: 609
  - Density: 15.0/km^{2} (38.8/sq mi)

Engi is a village, and former municipality, in the municipality of Glarus Süd and canton of Glarus in Switzerland. The village lies in the valley of the Sernf river, and consists of the three adjacent village parts of Engi-Vorderdorf, Engi-Dörfli and Engi-Hinterdorf.

== History ==
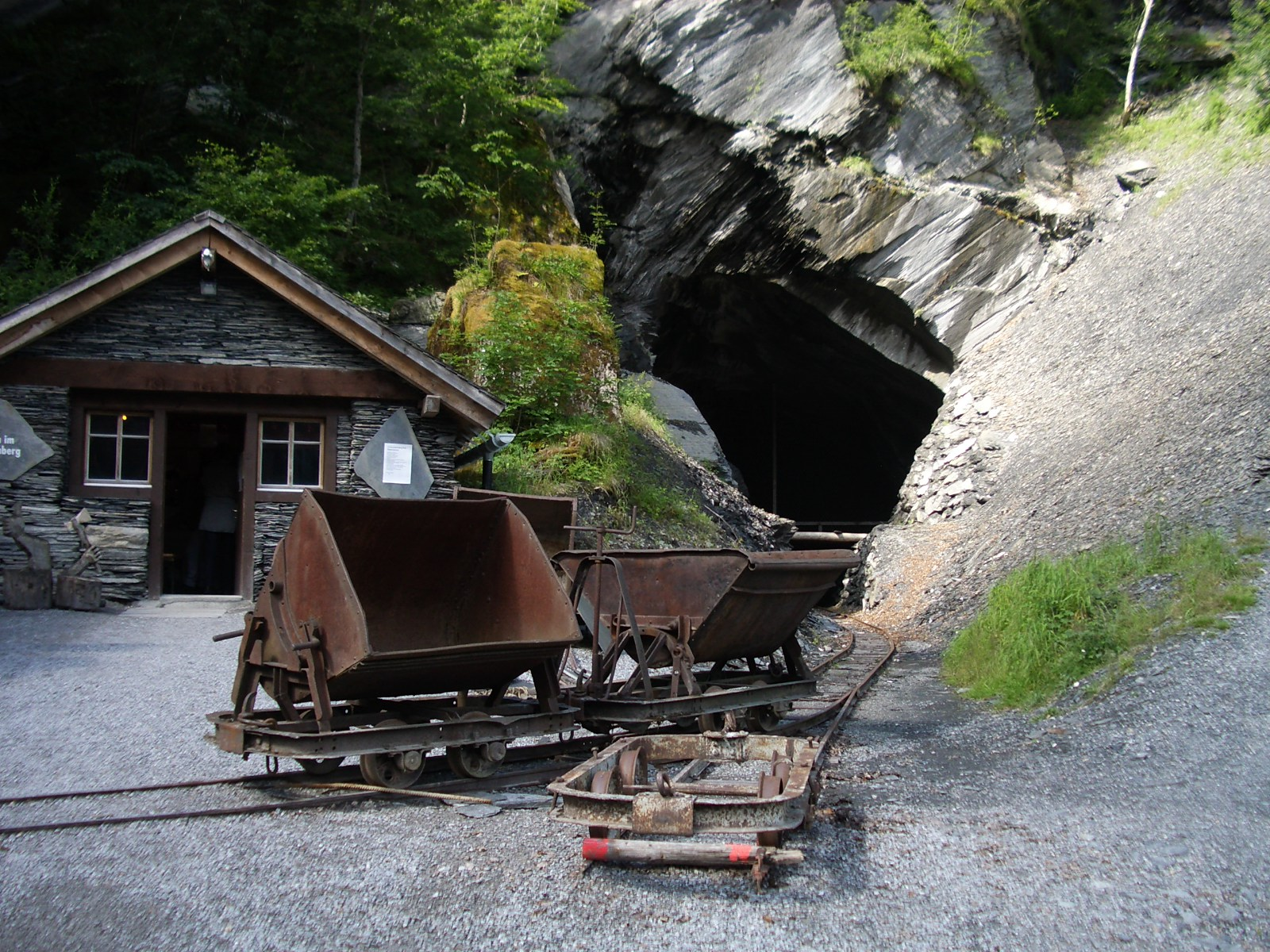
The preserved Landesplattenberg slate mine

Aerial view (1964)

Engi is first mentioned in 1350 as ze engi.

From the 16th century, slate mining took place on the Landesplattenberg, overlooking the left bank of Sernf river, which provided slates for roofs, floors and stoves, and later for use in schools. From 1602 the trade was sufficient to support an export tax, and exports to northern and western Europe peaked in the 17th century. The operation declined in the following years, before again increasing with the construction of the first road up the valley in 1826. By 1840, nearly two hundred workers were working in the mine, which was abandoned in 1961 but is now preserved as a tourist attraction.

The Early Oligocene Engi slates yield many fossils including sharks, bony fishes, turtles and birds. These fossils were mentioned as early as the beginning of the 18th century and became famous all over Europe.

In 1879, the valley of the Linth river was connected to the Swiss railway network by the opening of the Swiss Northeastern Railway line from Weesen, but Engi, in the side-valley of the Sernf river, remained unserved. This impacted the local economy, and various proposals were brought forward to provide rail service to the Sernf valley. Eventually, on 8 July 1905, the Sernftal tramway, a metre gauge roadside electric tramway, was opened connecting Schwanden with Engi and other communities as far as Elm. Service on this line continued until 31 May 1969, when it was replaced by road services.

On 1 January 2011, Engi became part of the new municipality of Glarus Süd.

== Geography ==
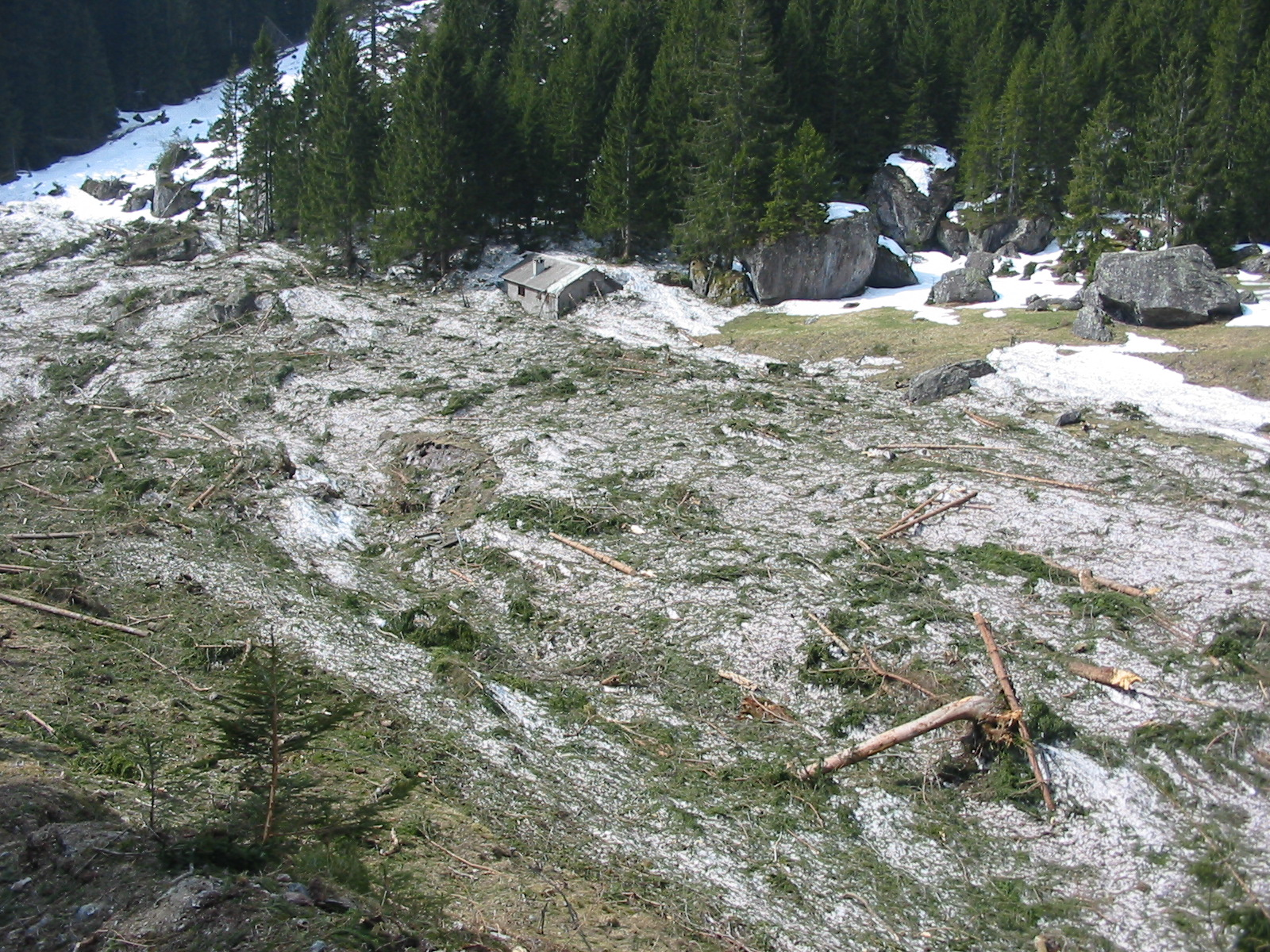
Avalanche trail in the mountains above Engi

The village of Engi is situated at an elevation of 812 m (2,664 ft) on the right bank of the Sernf river. It includes the village sections of Vorderdorf, Dörfli and Hinterdorf, and is located on and near the road between Schwanden and Elm. The village of Schwanden lies downstream and to the west, whilst the village of Matt lies upstream and to the south.

Engi has an area, as defined by the former municipal boundaries in 2006, of 40.7 km^{2} (15.7 sq mi), covering a considerable area on each side of the river. This area reaches up to the peaks of the Gufelstock (2,436 m or 7,992 ft), Bützistock (2,496 m or 8,189 ft), Magerrain (2,524 m or 8,281 ft) and Gulderstock (2,511 m or 8,238 ft) to the east, and the Gandstock (2,315 m or 7,595 ft) to the west. Of this area, 38.1% is used for agricultural purposes, while 36.1% is forested. Of the rest of the land, 1.2% is settled (buildings or roads) and the remainder (24.6%) is non-productive (rivers, glaciers or mountains).

== Transport ==
The Sernftalbus operates an hourly bus service linking Engi with Schwanden railway station, Elm, and other communities in the valley of the Sernf river between them. The service replaces the Sernftal tramway that operated between 1905 and 1969, over a similar route. At Schwanden railway station, a connecting railway service runs to the capital of the canton of Glarus, the town of Glarus.

== Demographics ==
Engi has a population (as of 31 December 2020) of 609. As of 2007, 6.9% of the population was made up of foreign nationals. Over the last 10 years the population has decreased at a rate of -10.1%. Most of the population (as of 2000) speaks German (95.0%), with Italian being second most common ( 1.4%) and Portuguese being third ( 0.6%).

In the 2007 federal election the most popular party was the SPS which received 59.1% of the vote. Most of the rest of the votes went to the SVP with 29.5% of the vote.

The entire Swiss population is generally well educated. In Engi about 61.8% of the population (between age 25-64) have completed either non-mandatory upper secondary education or additional higher education (either University or a Fachhochschule).

Engi has an unemployment rate of 0.76%. As of 2005, there were 62 people employed in the primary economic sector and about 22 businesses involved in this sector. 108 people are employed in the secondary sector and there are 10 businesses in this sector. 78 people are employed in the tertiary sector, with 15 businesses in this sector.

The historical population is given in the following table:

year	population
1777	267 adult males
1850	1,197
1900	1,160
1950	1,122
2000	656
