= Schwändi =

Schwändi, Schwaendi or Schwandi may refer to:

- Schwandi, Bern, a village in the Swiss canton of Bern
- Schwändi, near Elm, Glarus, a hamlet located near the village of Elm in the Swiss canton of Glarus
- Schwändi, near Schwanden, Glarus, a village and former municipality located near the village of Schwanden in the Swiss canton of Glarus
