= Engi =

Engi may refer to:

- Studio One Base, a Japanese animation studio
- Engi, Switzerland, a former municipality in the canton of Glarus in Switzerland
- Engi (era), a Japanese era
