= Richetli Pass =

Mountain pass in Glarus Alps

- Location within Switzerland
- Elevation: 2,261 metres (7,418 ft)
- Traversed by: Trail

Third Approach
- Location: Glarus, Switzerland
- Range: Glarus Alps
- Coordinates: 46°53′52.5″N 09°04′02.5″E

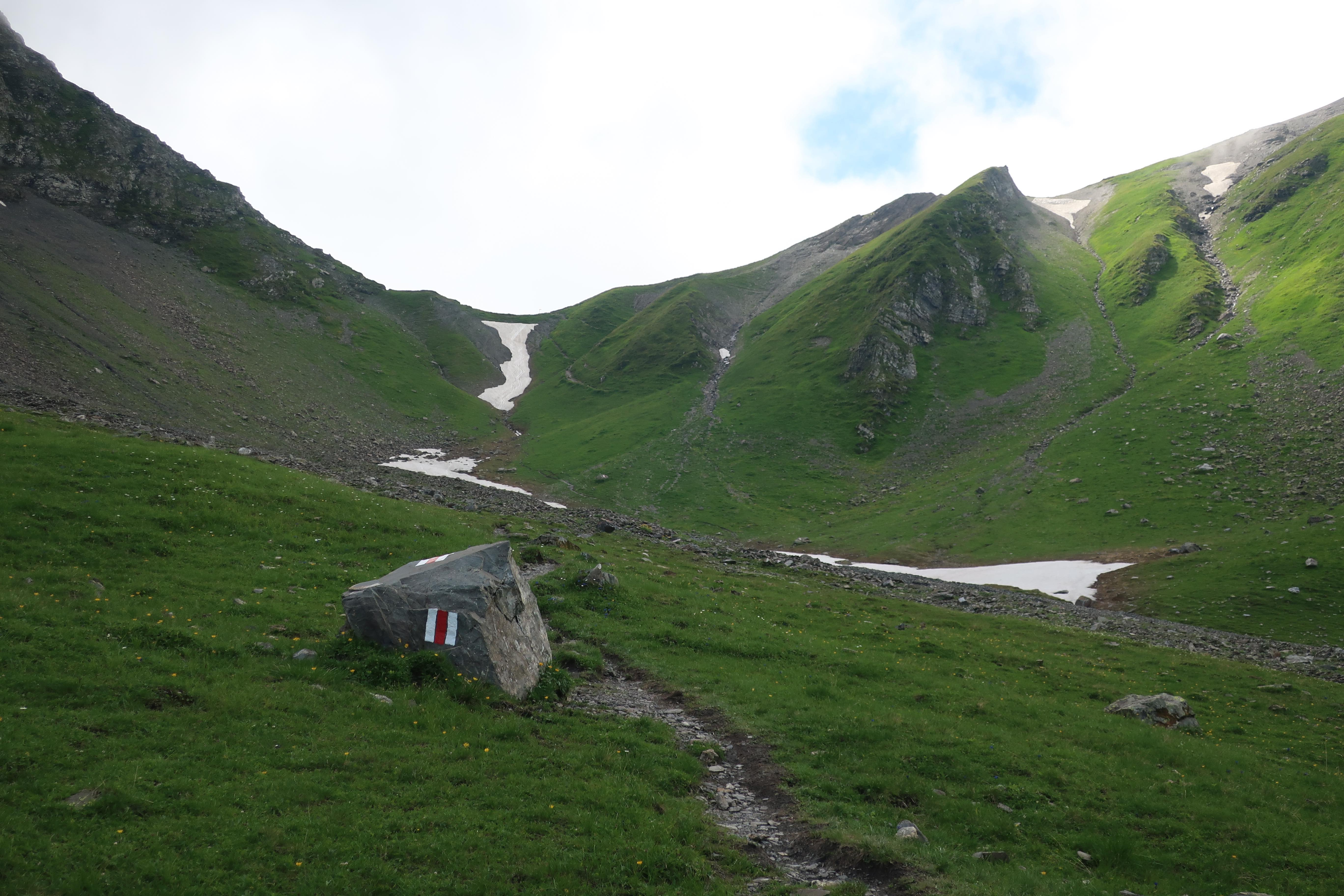
Richetli pass in Switzerland

The Richetli Pass (German: Richetlipass) is a high mountain pass in the Glarus Alps in the Swiss canton of Glarus. The pass crosses between the heads of the valleys of the Linth and the Sernf rivers, using the col between the Hausstock and Kärpf mountains, at an elevation of 2,261 m (7,418 ft).

The pass is traversed by a trail, which connects the village of Elm, at an elevation of 977 m (3,205 ft) with the village of Linthal, at an elevation of 650 m (2,130 ft). The trail forms part of the Alpine Pass Route, a long-distance hiking trail across Switzerland between Sargans and Montreux.

== See also ==
- List of mountain passes in Switzerland
