= Sool, Switzerland =

Sool
- Village (and former municipality)
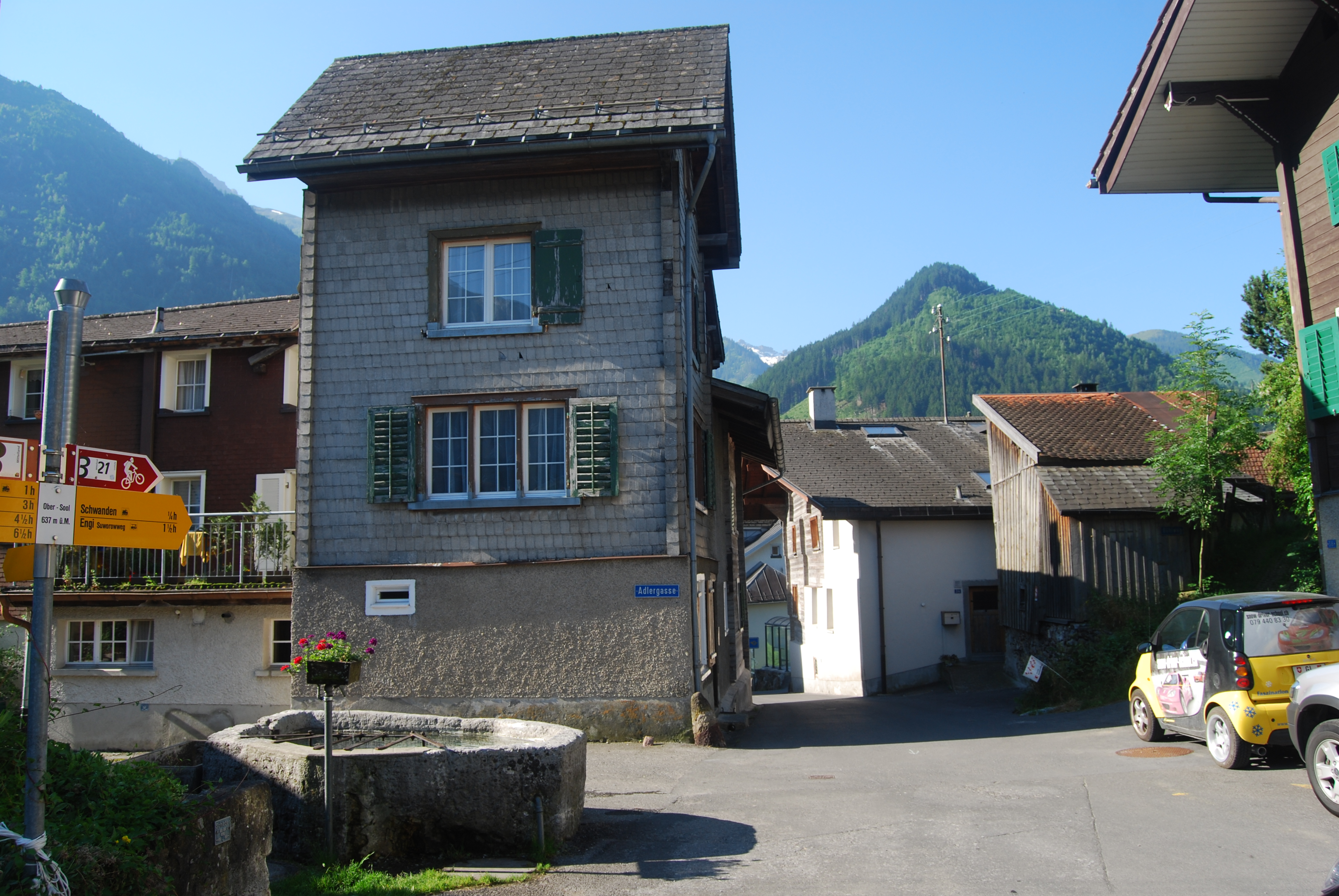

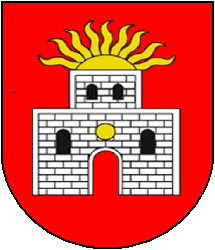
- Coat of arms

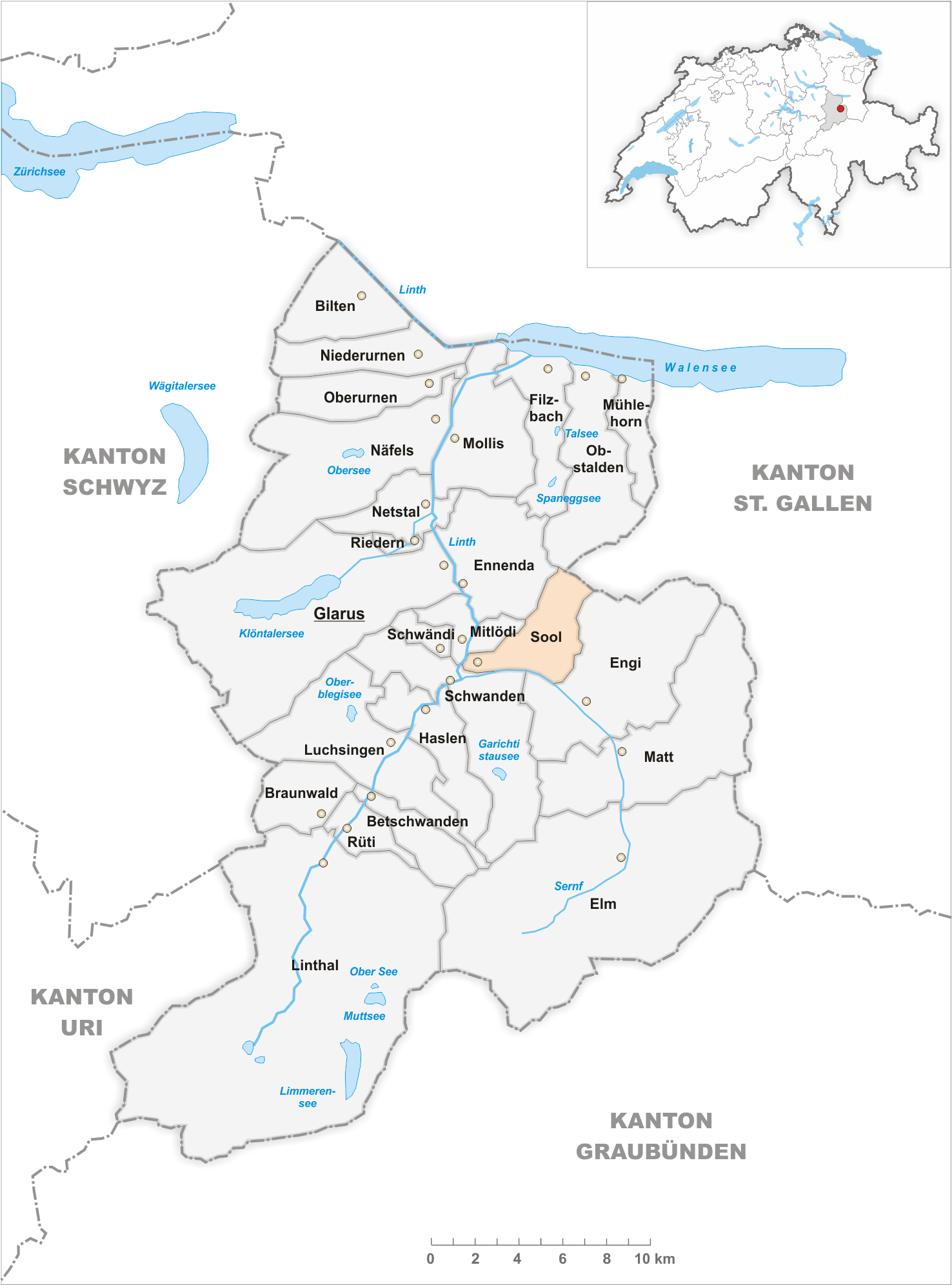
- The former municipal area (2007)
- Coordinates: 47°0′N 9°5′E
- Country: Switzerland
- Canton: Glarus
- Municipality: Glarus Süd

Area
  - Total: 13.26 km^{2} (5.12 sq mi)
- Elevation: 637 m (2,090 ft)

Population (December 2020)
  - Total: 296
  - Density: 22.3/km^{2} (57.8/sq mi)

Sool is a village, and former municipality, in the municipality of Glarus Süd and canton of Glarus in Switzerland.

== History ==
Sool is first mentioned between 1303 and 1307 as soler tagwan.

On 1 January 2011, Sool became part of the new municipality of Glarus Süd.

== Geography ==
The village of Sool is situated at an elevation of 637 m (2,090 ft) on a prehistoric landslide, betwe the valleys of the Linth and Sernf rivers. The village of Schwanden lies below it, at the confluence of both rivers.

Sool has an area, as defined by the former municipal boundaries in 2006, of 13.3 km^{2} (5.1 sq mi), covering a considerable area to the north and east of the village. This area reaches up to the peak of the Gufelstock (2,436 m or 7,992 ft). Of this area, 23.6% is used for agricultural purposes, while 42% is forested. Of the rest of the land, 1.2% is settled (buildings or roads) and the remainder (33.2%) is non-productive (rivers, glaciers or mountains).

== Transport ==
The Sernftalbus operates a bus service linking Sool with Schwanden railway station, with several return journeys a day. At Schwanden railway station, a connecting railway service runs to the capital of the canton of Glarus, the town of Glarus.

== Demographics ==
Sool has a population (as of 31 December 2020) of 296. As of 2007, 3.5% of the population was made up of foreign nationals. Over the last 10 years the population has grown at a rate of 2.1%. Most of the population (as of 2000) speaks German (98.0%), with Russian being second most common ( 1.0%) and Rhaeto-Romance being third ( 0.3%).

In the 2007 federal election the most popular party was the SPS which received 80% of the vote. Most of the rest of the votes went to the SVP with 14.4% of the vote.

In Sool about 72.9% of the population (between age 25 and 64) have completed either non-mandatory upper secondary education or additional higher education (either University or a Fachhochschule).

Sool has an unemployment rate of 1.5%. As of 2005, there were 15 people employed in the primary economic sector and about 9 businesses involved in this sector. 8 people are employed in the secondary sector and there are 2 businesses in this sector. 10 people are employed in the tertiary sector, with 4 businesses in this sector.
