= Sernftal tramway =

Tramway line in Glarus, Switzerland

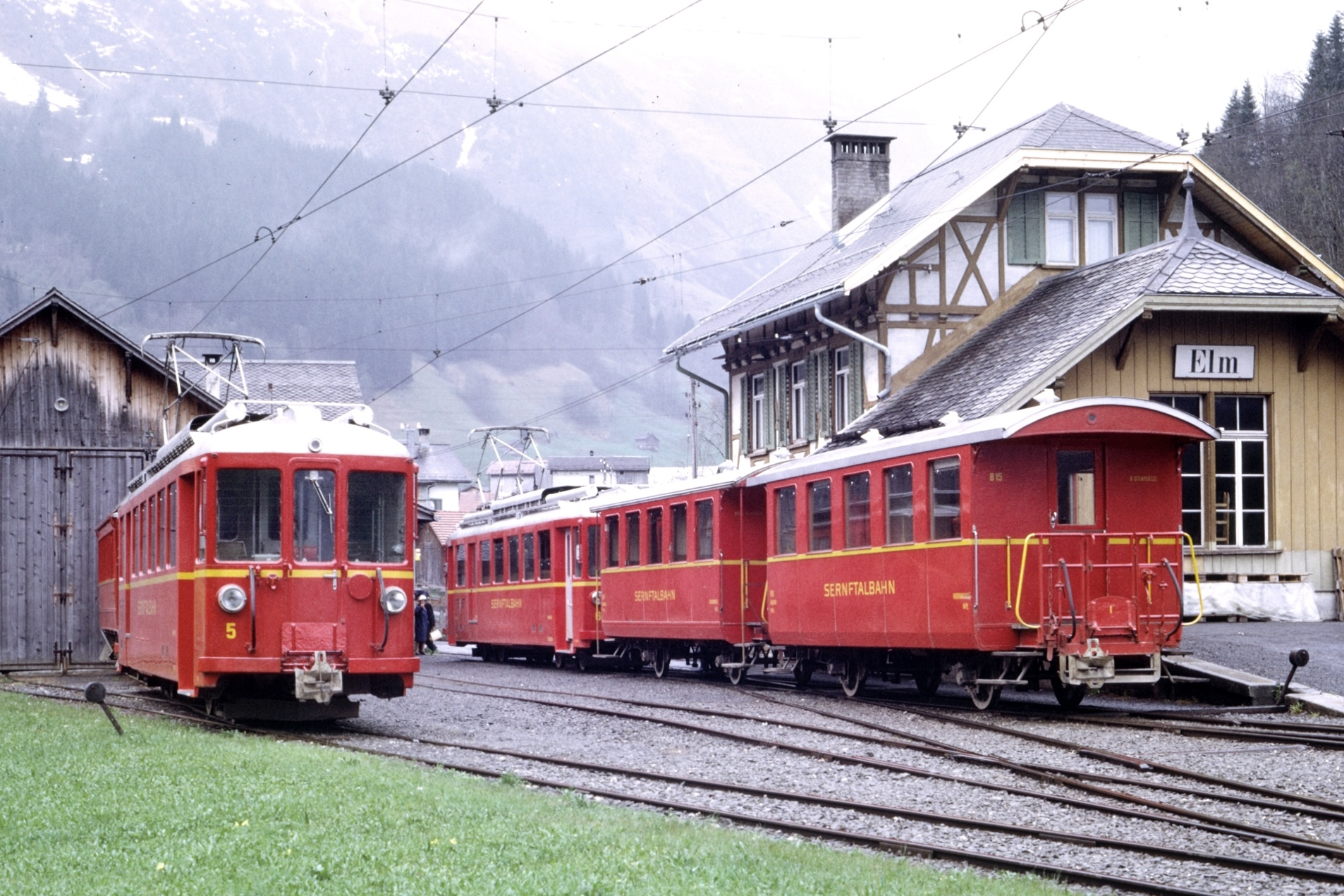
- Elm station in 1968

Overview
- Native name: Sernftalbahn
- Locale: Canton of Glarus
- Termini: Schwanden; Elm
- Stations: 13

Service
- Services: 1
- Depot: Engi-Vorderdorf

History
- Opened: 7 August 1905
- Closed: 31 May 1969

Technical
- Line length: 13.8 km (8.6 mi)
- Character: Rural electric tramway
- Track gauge: 1,000 mm (3 ft 3 3/8 in))
- Minimum radius: 39 metres (128 ft)
- Electrification: 750 V / 800 V DC
- Operating speed: 40 km/h (25 mph)

The Sernftal tramway (German: Sernftalbahn, SeTB) was an electric narrow-gauge tramway in the Swiss canton of Glarus, which was operated by a private company. The line linked Schwanden railway station, on the Weesen-Linthal railway line, with communities in the Sernf valley including Engi, Matt and Elm, where the line terminated. The line served a total of 13 stations, and its depot was situated at Engi-Vorderdorf, at roughly the half-way point of the line.

== History ==
In 1879, the valley of the Linth river was connected to the Swiss railway network by the opening of the Weesen to Linthal line, but the side-valley of the Sernf river remained unserved. This impacted the local economy, and various proposals were brought forward to provide rail service to the Sernf valley. The eventual result was the Sernftal tramway, which opened on 7 August 1905.

The line was constructed to metre gauge (3 ft 3 3/8 in gauge) and largely ran immediately alongside the road, with some narrow street running sections through the villages. This resulted in a difficult to operate line, with a minimum curve radius of 39 m (128 ft) and a maximum gradient of 6.8%. It was electrified using direct current (first 750, then 800 V) generated from a hydro-electric power plant in Matt.

Because the line ran in the road the railway company was responsible for maintenance of the road surface as well as its own tracks. and the line struggled financially with its operation requiring a subsidy from 1922. Closure of the railway and replacement with buses or trolleybuses was considered in 1939/1940, but the line remained opened until 1969. The line's official closure was on 24 May and the final special services ran on 31 May 1969. The operating company survived, changing its name to Autobetrieb Sernftal, and still operates the bus service bus services in the area under the name Sernftalbus.

== Rolling stock ==
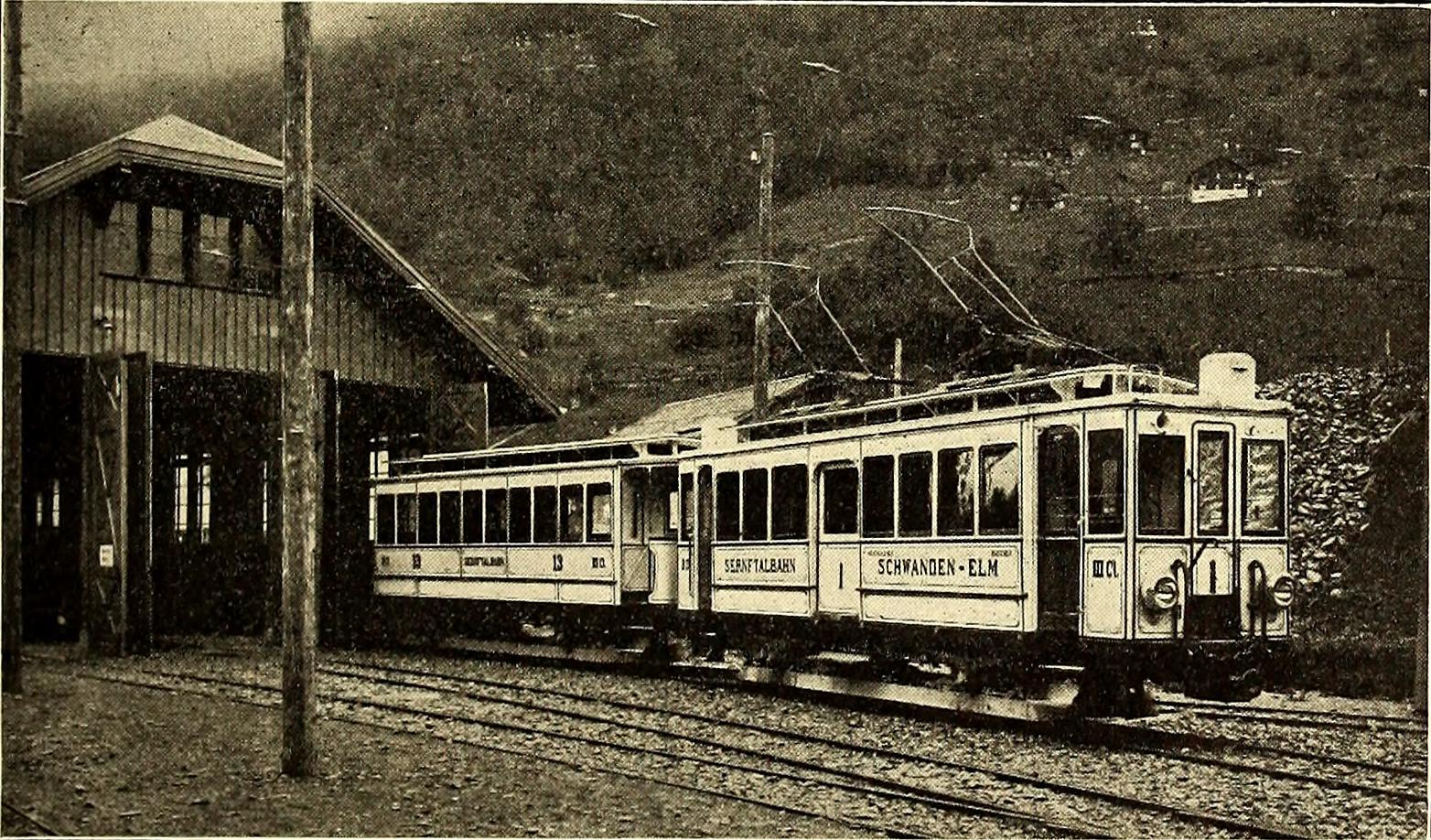
Railcar BCFe 2/2 1 and carriage B 13 in 1906

The line's original passenger rolling stock was three four-wheel railcars, BCFe 2/2 1–3 and three carriages, B 11–13. For goods traffic there was a four-wheel goods railcar, Fe 2/2 21, four vans and five open wagons. Increasing traffic led to the purchase of a fourth passenger railcar, BCFe 2/2 4, and more goods wagons in 1928. In 1955 Fe 2/2 21, was replaced with a new goods railcar, Fe 2/2 22, built on the chassis of BCFe 2/2 2.

The line was modernised in 1949 with three new bogie railcars, CFe 4/4 (later BDe 4/4) 5–7. Each had 50 seats and a baggage compartment and they allowed the journey time from Schwanden to Elm to be reduced from 52 to 40 minutes. When the Sernftal line closed these railcars were sold to the Aigle–Ollon–Monthey–Champéry railway, and later resold to Stern & Hafferl in Austria for use on their Traunseebahn and Atterseebahn. Railcar 7 was destroyed in a fire in 1987, but the other two remained in use until 2016. In 2017 they were acquired by the Verein Sernftalbahn and returned to the Sernf Valley.

== Museum ==
A preservation society, the Verein Sernftalbahn, runs a museum at Engi-Vorderdorf. Their collection includes railcars BDe 4/4 5 and 6, restored to their original condition, and two freight cars from the line (K35 and K36).

When the line closed some rolling stock went to the Blonay–Chamby museum railway: a four-wheeled motor coach of 1928 (BDe 2/2 4), a trailer (B2 13) and a freight car (K31), both of 1905.
