= Autobetrieb Sernftal =

Swiss transport company

Logo of Serftalbus

The Autobetrieb Sernftal AG is a bus operating company in the Swiss canton of Glarus. The company operates under the trading name of Sernftalbus. The company is the successor to the company that operated the Sernftal tramway between Schwanden and Elm between 1905 and 1969. It still operates the bus service that replaced that tramway, together with several other bus services in the area, and a coach hire business.

The company operates several bus services from Schwanden railway station:

- an hourly service up the valley of the Sernf river through Engi and Matt to Elm
- an hourly service to Schwändi
- a service to Sool, with several return journeys a day
- a summer-only service to Kies, with several return journeys a day connecting with the aerial tramway to Mettmen
