= Schwanden, Glarus =

Schwanden
- Village (and former municipality)
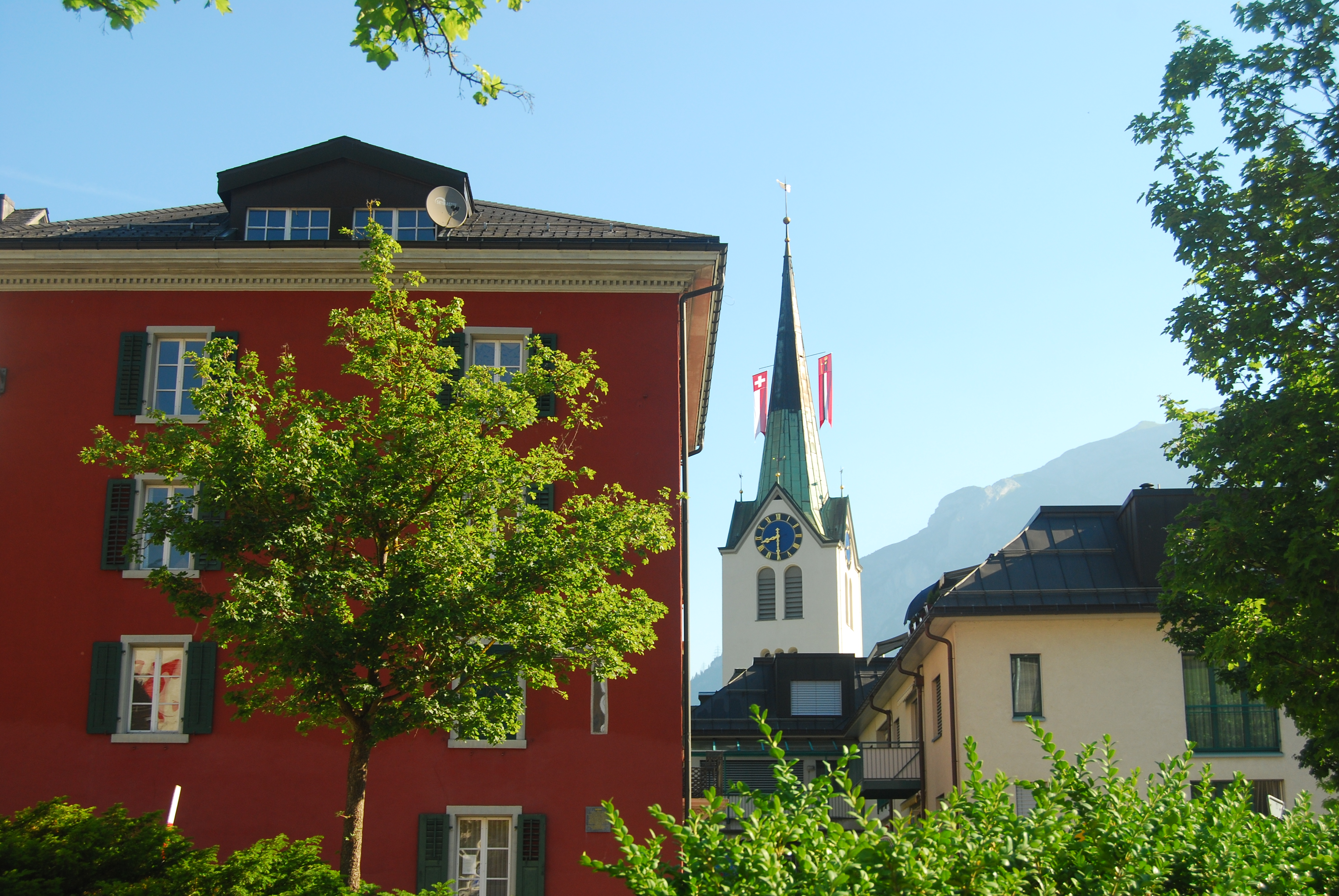

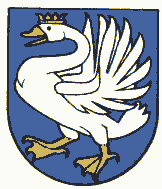
- Coat of arms

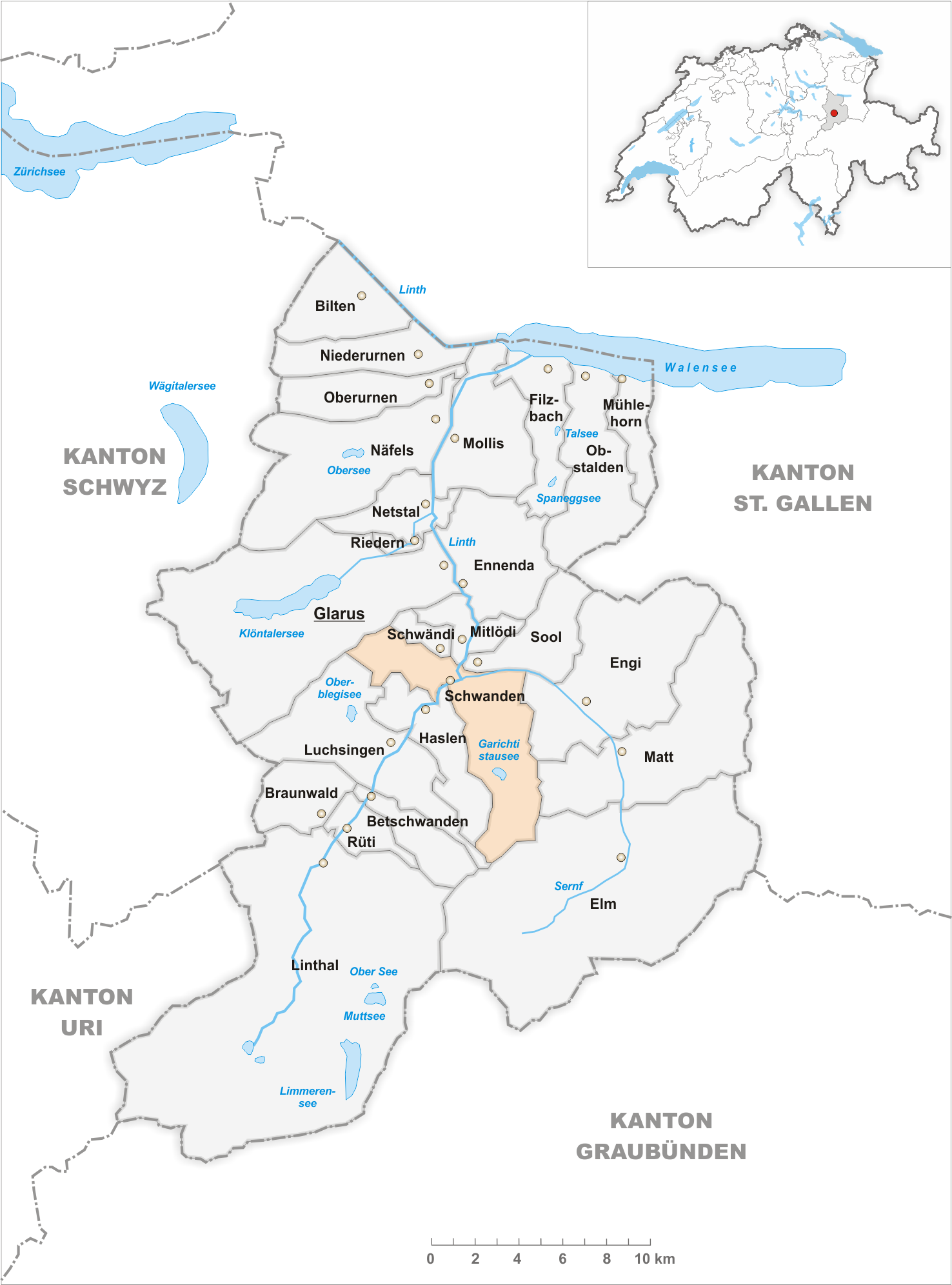
- The former municipal area (2007)
- Coordinates: 46°59′39″N 9°4′30″E
- Country: Switzerland
- Canton: Glarus
- Municipality: Glarus Süd

Area
  - Total: 30.63 km^{2} (11.83 sq mi)
- Elevation: 528 m (1,732 ft)

Population (December 2010)
  - Total: 2,392
  - Density: 78.09/km^{2} (202.3/sq mi)

Schwanden is a village, and former municipality, in the municipality of Glarus Süd and canton of Glarus in Switzerland.

== History ==
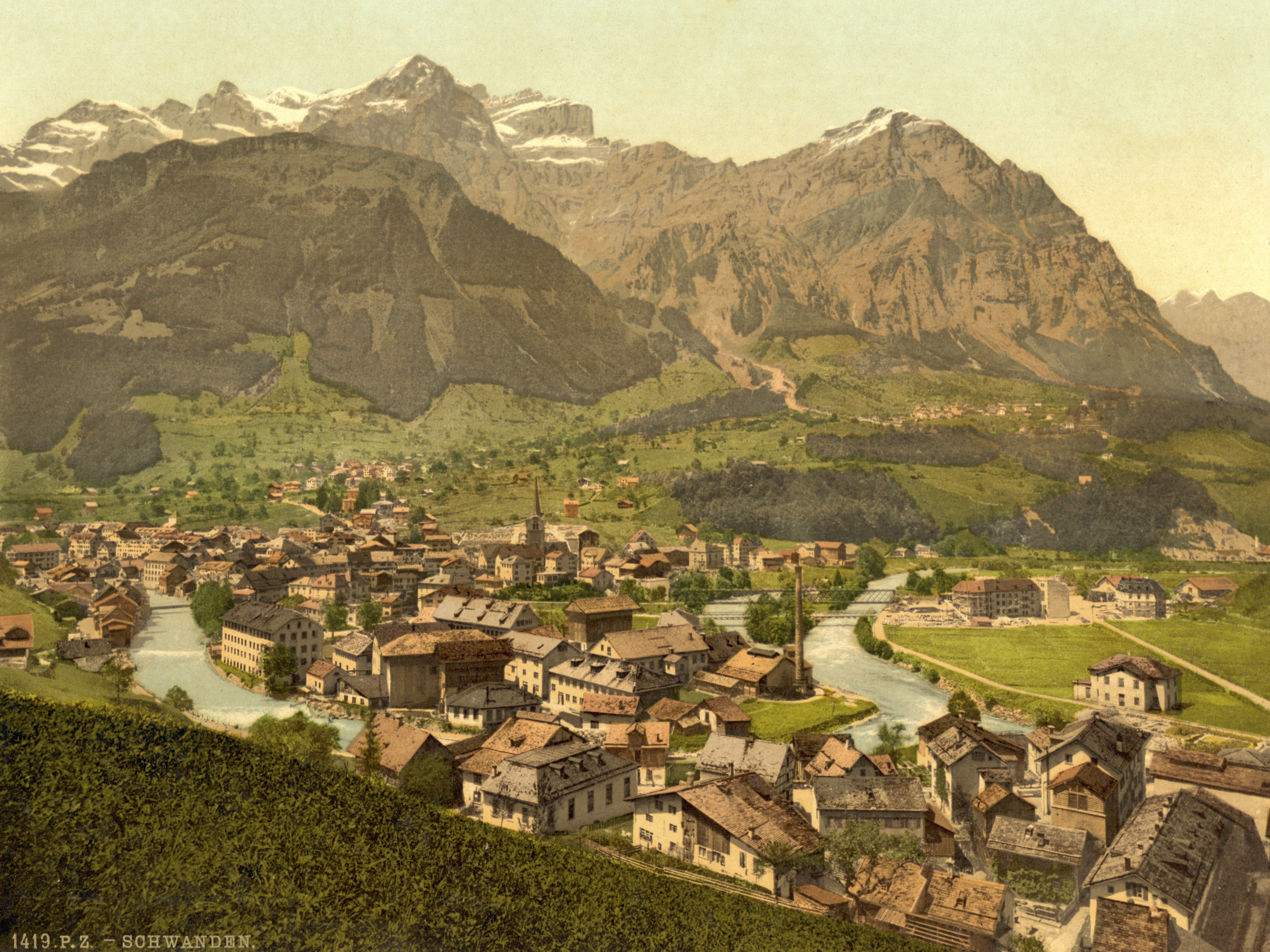
Schwanden ca.1890-1900

Aerial view by Walter Mittelholzer (1932)

Schwanden is first mentioned in 1240 as de swando.

In 1879, Schwanden was connected to the Swiss railway network by the opening of the Swiss Northeastern Railway line from Weesen. Between 1905 and 1969, the Sernftal tramway connected Schwanden with communities in the valley of the Sernf river as far as Elm.

On 1 January 2011, Schwanden became part of the municipality of Glarus Süd.

== Geography ==
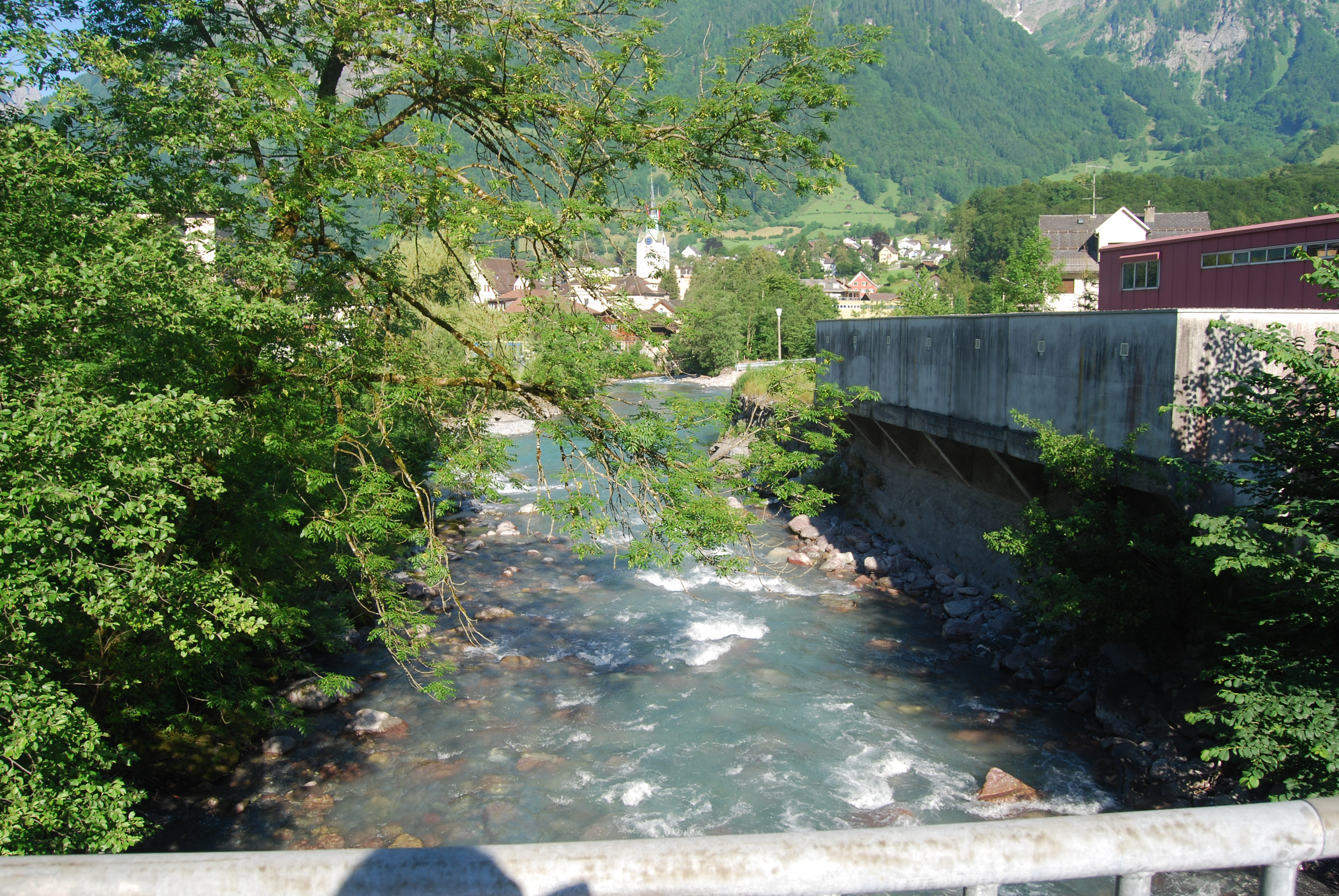
The Sernf river in Schwanden

Schwanden is situated at an elevation of 528 m (1,732 ft) at the point of confluence of the Linth and Sernf rivers. The village is located along the roads to Elm, Linthal and Schwändi, and includes the formerly independent (until 1876) hamlet of Thon. The villages of Nidfurn and Haslen lie to south in the valley of the Linth, whilst the village of Engi lies to the east in the valley of the Sernf. To the north, the village of Mitlödi lies in the valley of the Linth, whilst Schwandi and Sool are respectively on the west and east slopes of the valley.

South of Schwanden is the oldest Jagdbanngebiet (literally hunting-banned area) in Switzerland, the Freiberg Kärpf, which has been protected since 1548. Also to the south, the Niederenbäch stream descends from the slopes of the mountain of Kärpf (2,794 m or 9,167 ft). This stream has been dammed to create the Garichtisee reservoir.

Schwanden has an area, as defined by the former municipal boundaries in 2006, of 30.6 km^{2} (11.8 sq mi). Of this area, 32.3% is used for agricultural purposes, while 38.3% is forested. Of the rest of the land, 3.2% is settled (buildings or roads) and the remainder (26.2%) is non-productive (rivers, glaciers or mountains).

== Transport ==
Schwanden is located on the Hauptstrasse 17, which runs the length of the canton of Glarus before climbing the Klausen Pass into the canton of Uri, as well as on the Weesen to Linthal railway line that parallels the main road and the Linth river through Glarus. A side road branches off Hauptstrasse 17 in Schwanden and heads the valley of Sernf, serving the communities of that village, but there is no road connection beyond the head of that valley. The high alpine Klausen Pass is normally only open to traffic between June and September, and for the rest of the year the road and railway up the Linth valley form the only access to Schwanden.

The village is served by Schwanden railway station, which is a calling point of the Zürich S-Bahn service S25 between Linthal and Zürich, and is the terminus of the St. Gallen S-Bahn service S6 from Rapperswil. As of the December 2023 timetable change, both services operate once per hour, combining to provide two trains per hour between Ziegelbrücke and Schwanden.

The Sernftalbus operates several bus services from Schwanden station:

- an hourly service up the valley of the Sernf river to Glarus (replacing the former Sernftal tramway)
- an hourly service to Schwändi
- a service to Sool, with several return journeys a day
- a summer-only service, with several return journeys a day, to connect with an aerial tramway to the Garichtisee.

== Demographics ==
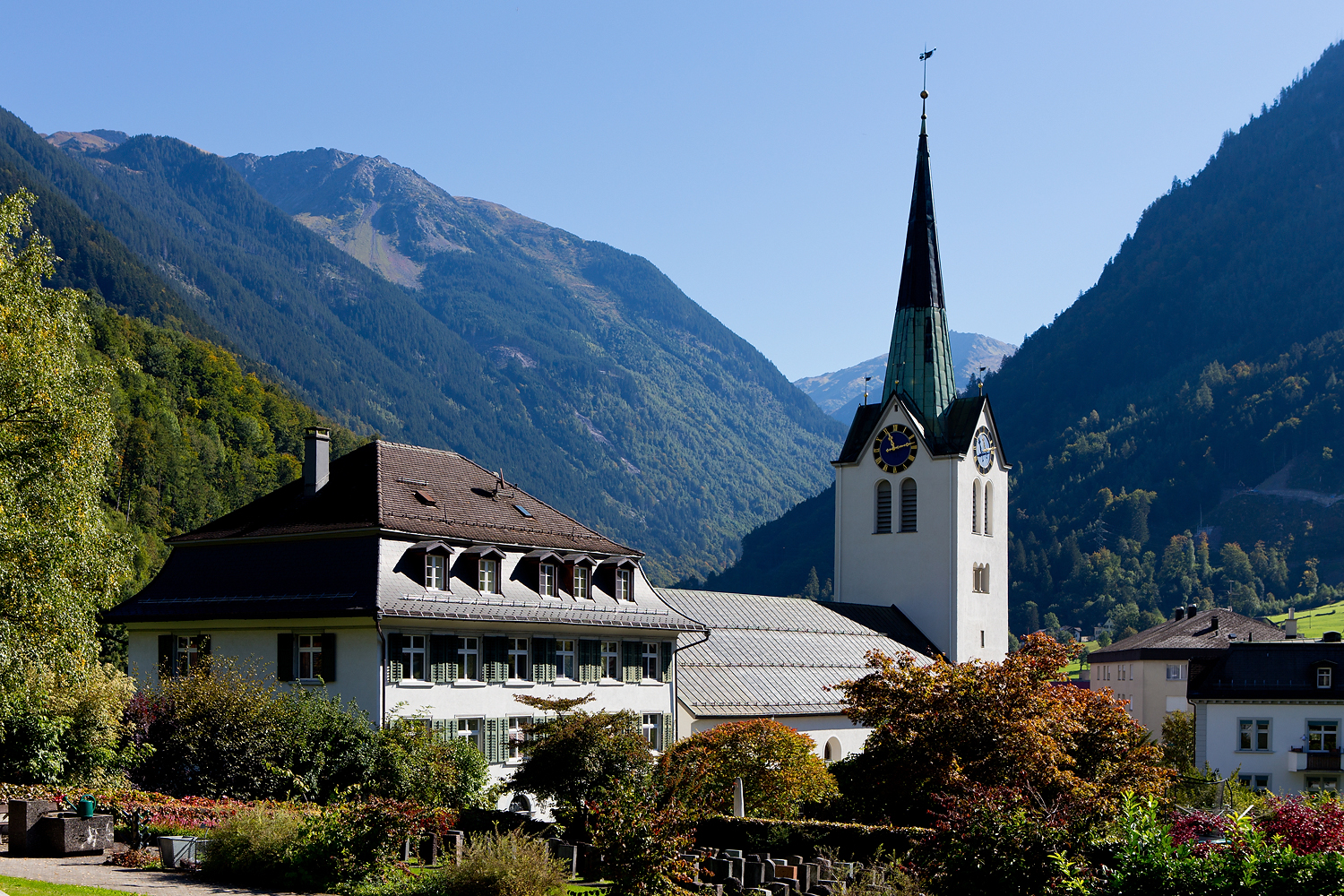
The church in Schwanden

As of 2010, Schwanden had a population of 2,392. As of 2007, 24.2% of the population was made up of foreign nationals. Over the last 10 years the population has decreased at a rate of -6.9%. Most of the population (as of 2000) speaks German (82.7%), with Italian being second most common ( 5.1%) and Albanian being third (2.9%).

In the 2007 federal election the most popular party was the SPS which received 59% of the vote. Most of the rest of the votes went to the SVP with 31.6% of the vote.

In Schwanden about 60.6% of the population (between age 25-64) have completed either non-mandatory upper secondary education or additional higher education (either University or a Fachhochschule).

Schwanden has an unemployment rate of 2.18%. As of 2005, there were 39 people employed in the primary economic sector and about 15 businesses involved in this sector. 1,067 people are employed in the secondary sector and there are 45 businesses in this sector. 525 people are employed in the tertiary sector, with 92 businesses in this sector.

The historical population is given in the following table:

year	population
1574	450
1763	1,148
1850	2,296
1900	2,396
1960	3,020
1990	2,645
