= Schwanden railway station =

Railway station in Switzerland

Schwanden
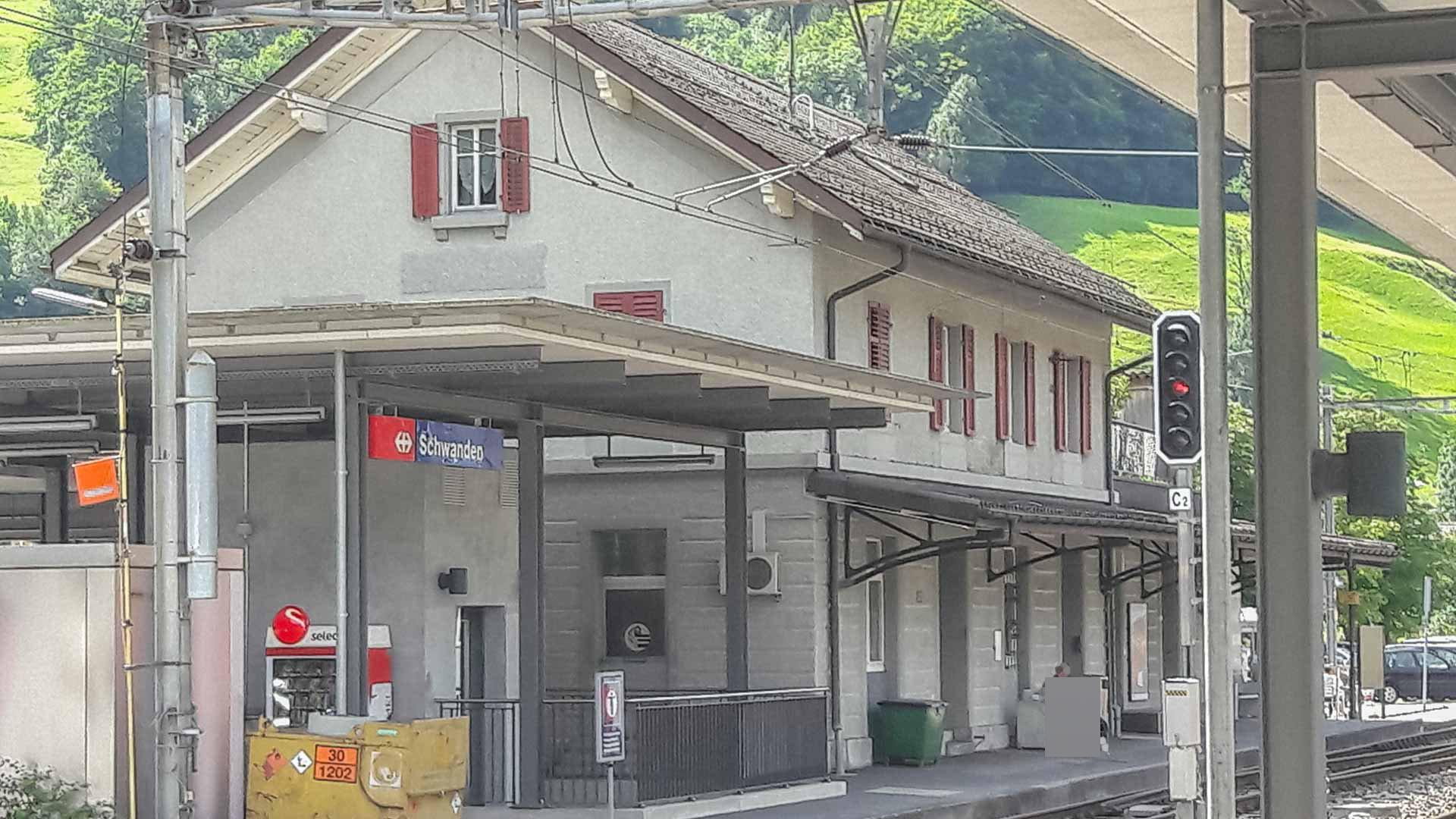
- The station building in 2017

General information
- Location: Bahnhofstrasse; Glarus Süd, Glarus; Switzerland
- Coordinates: 46°59′49″N 9°04′39″E
- Elevation: 521 m (1,709 ft)
- Owner: Swiss Federal Railways
- Line: Ziegelbrücke–Linthal line
- Distance: 73.8 km (45.9 mi) from Zürich
- Train operators: Südostbahn; Swiss Federal Railways
- Connections
- Bus: Sernftalbus

Other information
- Fare zone: 903, 904, and 911 (Tarifverbund Ostwind)

Passengers
- 2018: 1,500 per weekday

Services
Preceding station	Zurich S-Bahn	Following station
Mitlödi towards Zürich HB	S25	Nidfurn-Haslen towards Linthal
Preceding station	St. Gallen S-Bahn	Following station
Mitlödi towards Rapperswil	S6	Terminus
Location

Schwanden railway station (German: Bahnhof Schwanden) is a railway station in the municipality of Glarus Süd in the Swiss canton of Glarus. It is an intermediate stop on the Weesen to Linthal railway line, and serves the village of Schwanden.

Between 1905 and 1969, the station was the terminus of the Sernftal tramway, a metre gauge tramway that ran up the valley of the Sernf to Elm, and was the predecessor of the Sernftalbus service on the same route.

== Services ==
=== S-Bahn ===
The station is served by Zürich S-Bahn service S25 between Zurich and Linthal. It is also the terminus of the St. Gallen S-Bahn service S6 from/to Rapperswil. This service continues to Linthal during off-peak hours. Both services operate once per hour, combining to provide two trains per hour between Ziegelbrücke and Schwanden.

As of the December 2020 timetable change, the following rail services stop at Schwanden:

- St. Gallen S-Bahn S6: hourly service to Rapperswil (and hourly service to Linthal during off-peak hours).
- Zürich S-Bahn S25: hourly service between Zürich HB and Linthal.

=== Bus ===
The station is also the terminus of several connecting bus routes, operated by the Sernftalbus company:

- an hourly service up the valley of the Sernf river to Elm
- an hourly service to Schwändi
- a service to Sool, with several return journeys a day
- a summer-only service from Kies, with several return journeys a day, to connect with an aerial tramway to the Garichtisee.
