= Freiberg Kärpf =

Wildlife sanctuary in Switzerland

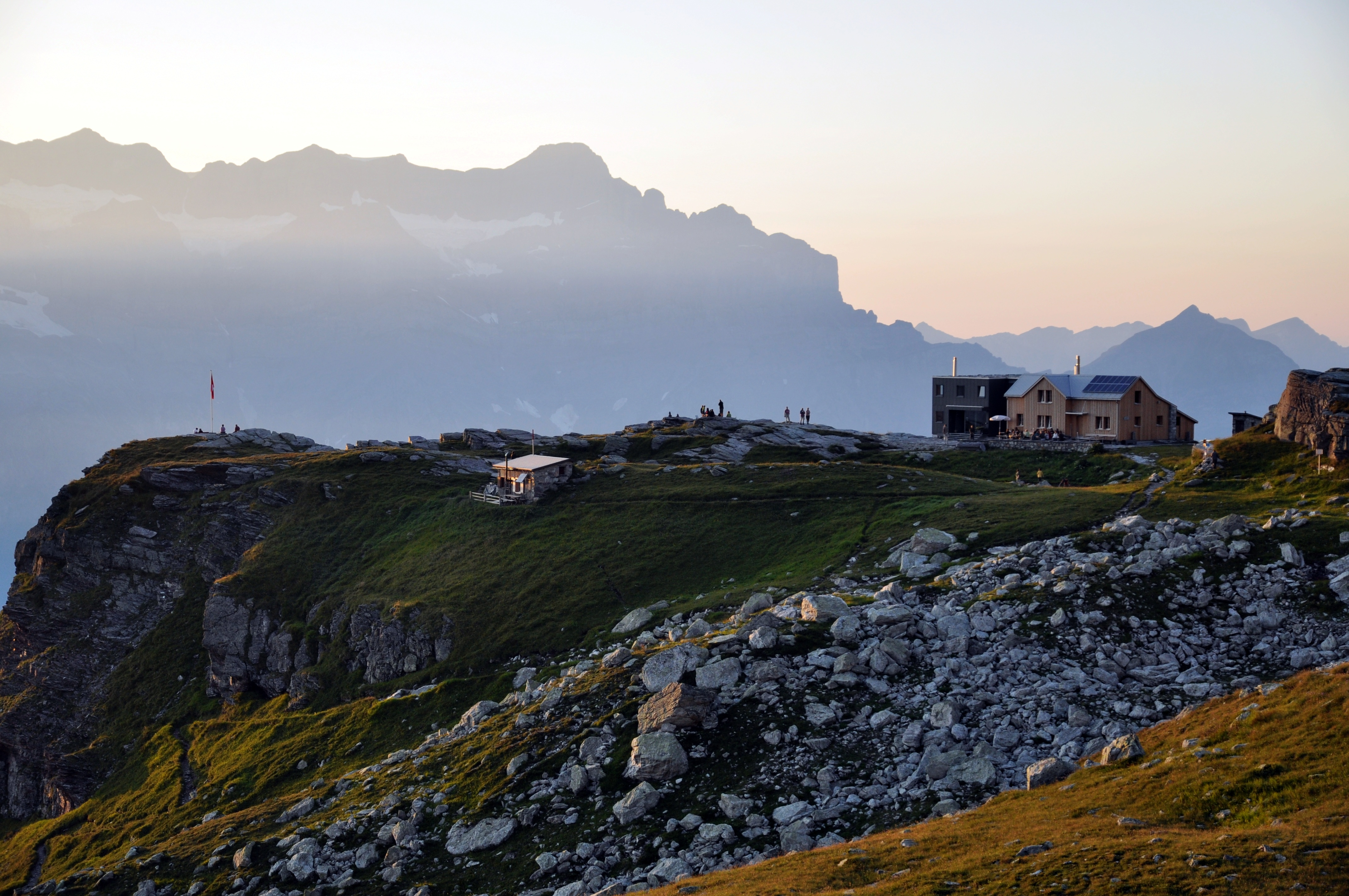
The Leglerhütte with the Glärnisch mountains in the background

Freiberg Kärpf is a wildlife sanctuary above Schwanden in the canton of Glarus, Switzerland. It covers an area of 106 square kilometres (41 sq mi). Founded in 1548, it is the oldest nature reserve in Europe.
