= Gulderstock =

Mountain in Switzerland

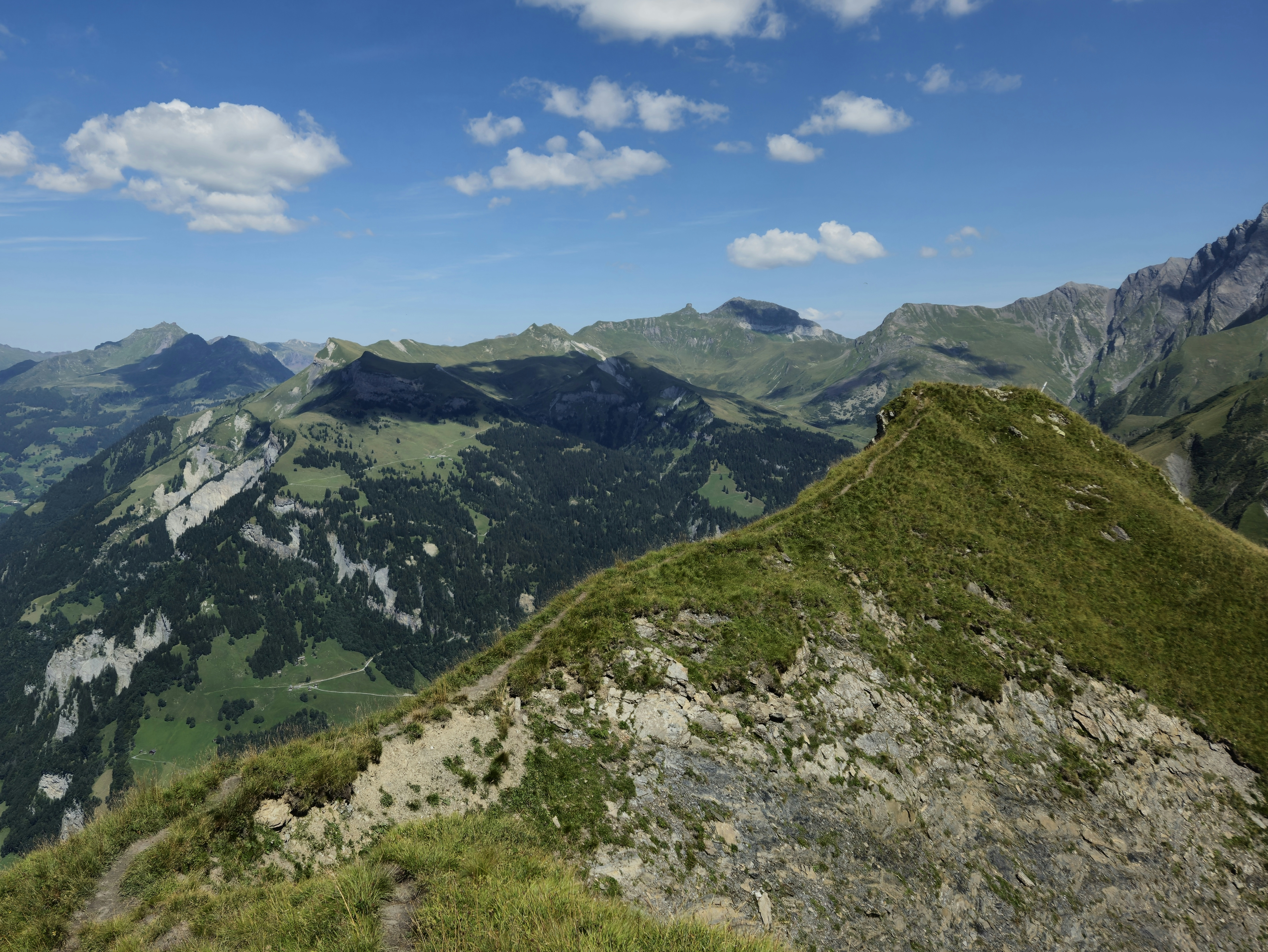
- Gulderstock (background left)

Highest point
- Elevation: 2,511 m (8,238 ft)
- Prominence: 239 m (784 ft)
- Parent peak: Magerrain
- Coordinates: 46°59′36″N 9°12′05″E

Geography
- Location within Switzerland Location within Canton of Glarus
- Country: Switzerland
- Canton: Glarus
- Parent range: Glarus Alps

The Gulderstock is a mountain of the Glarus Alps in Switzerland, located north of Matt in the canton of Glarus. It lies south of the Magerrain, on the range between the valleys of Mülibach and Chrauchtal.

== See also ==
- List of mountains of the canton of Glarus
