= Garichtisee =

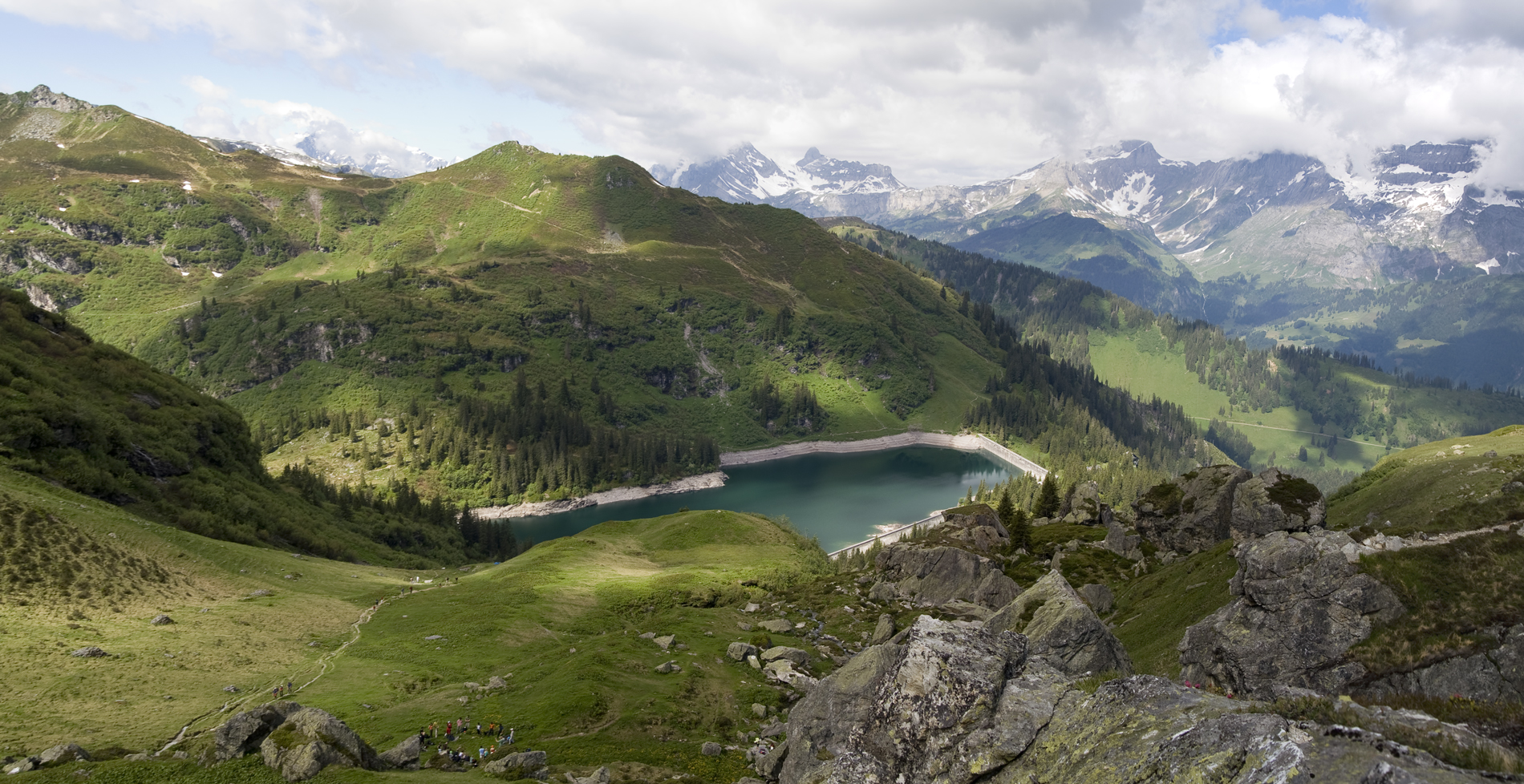

- Location within Canton of Glarus Location within Switzerland Location within Alps
- Interactive map of Garichtisee
- Location: Canton of Glarus
- Coordinates: 46°57′21″N 9°06′00″E
- Type: reservoir
- Catchment area: 7.8 km^{2} (3.0 sq mi)
- Basin countries: Switzerland
- Surface area: 16 ha (40 acres)
- Surface elevation: 1,648 m (5,407 ft)

Garichtisee, also known as Mettmensee, is a reservoir on Mettmenalp above Schwanden in the Canton of Glarus, Switzerland. The lake's surface area is 16 ha (40 acres).

It is located at an elevation of 1,622 metres, within the Freiberg Kärpf, the oldest wildlife sanctuary in Europe.

== See also ==
- List of mountain lakes of Switzerland
