= Schwändi, near Schwanden, Glarus =

Schwändi
- Village (and former municipality)
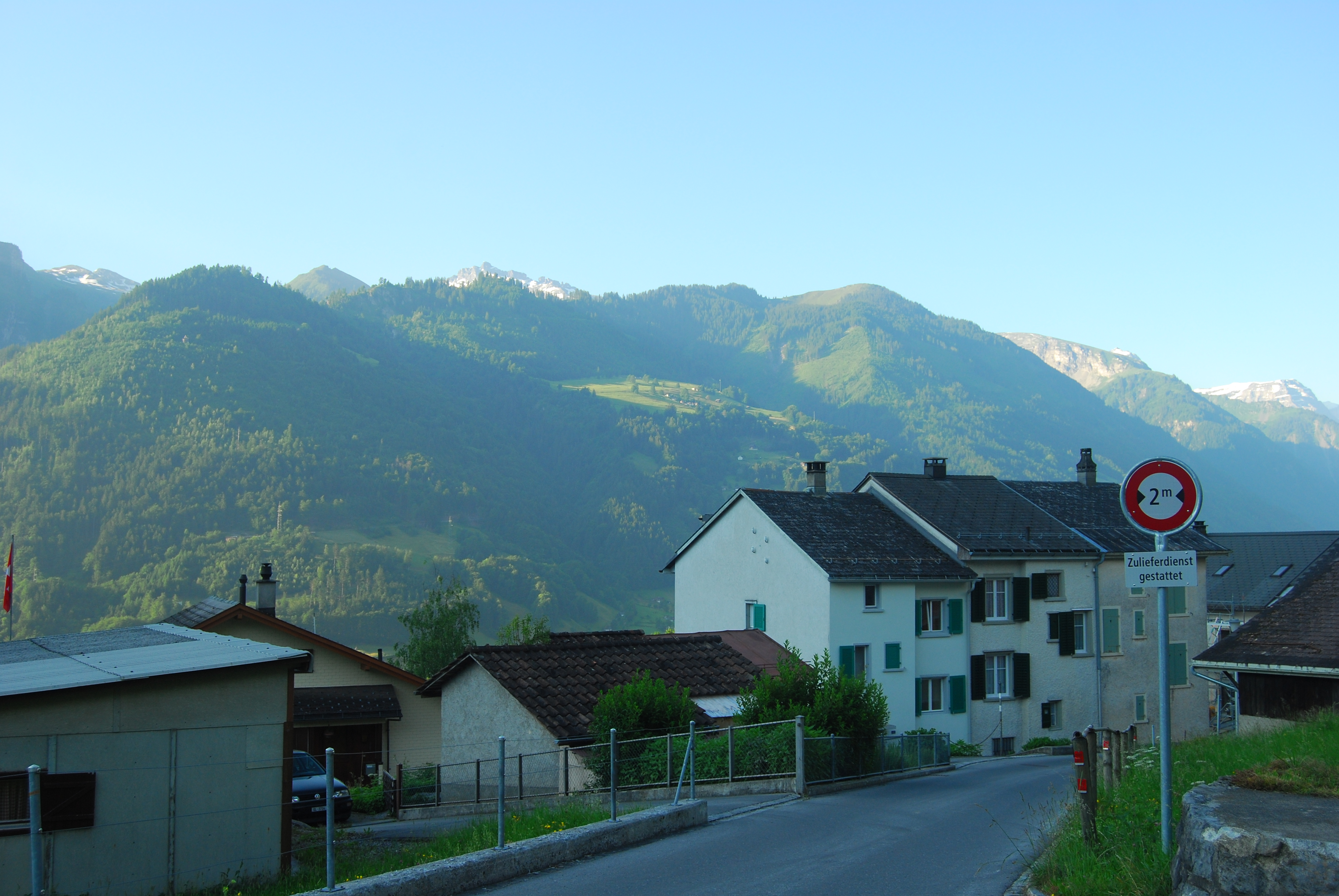

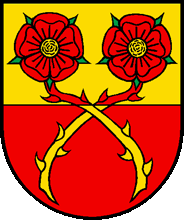
- Coat of arms

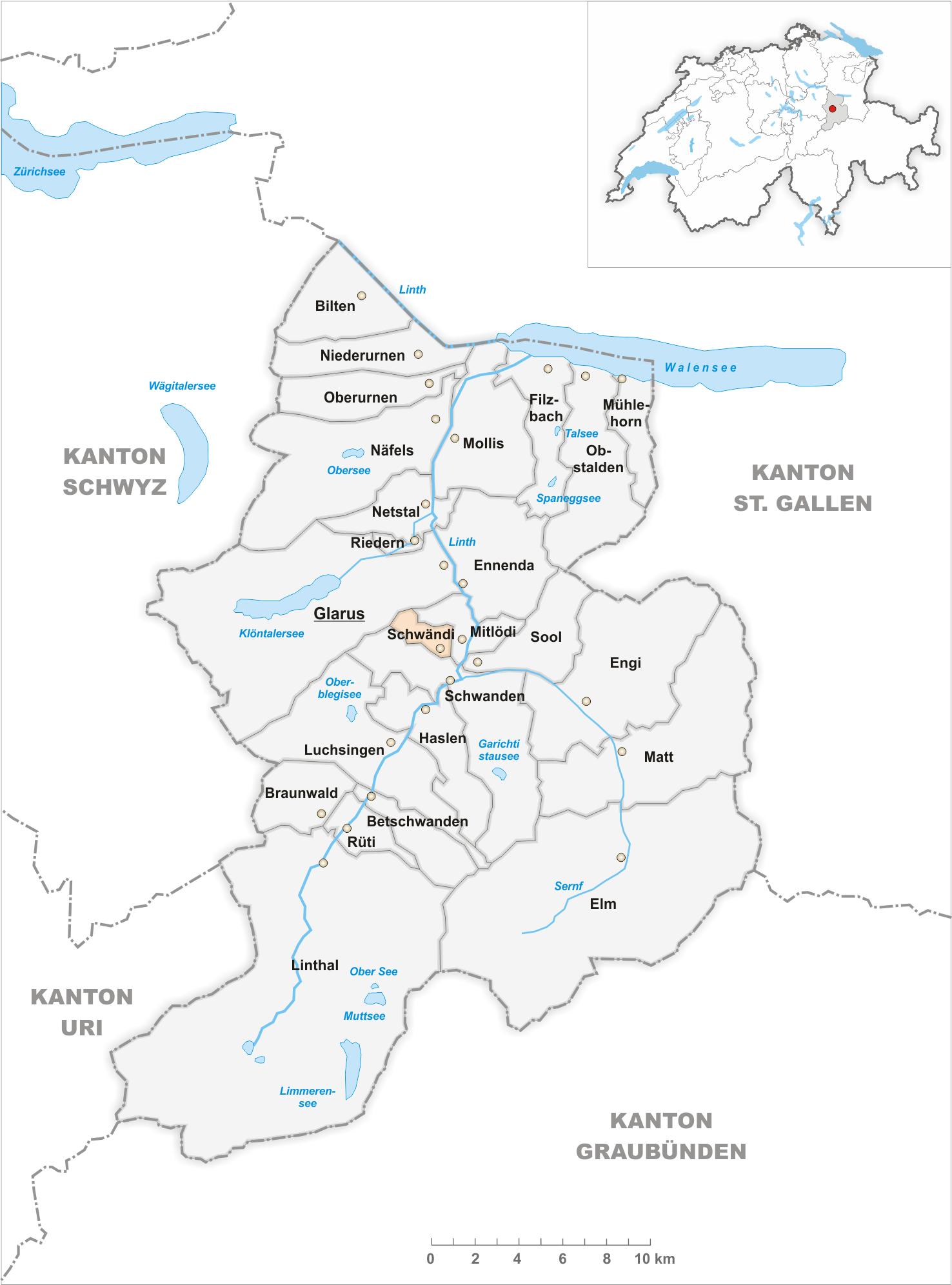
- The former municipal area (2007)
- Coordinates: 47°0′N 9°4′E
- Country: Switzerland
- Canton: Glarus
- Municipality: Glarus Süd

Area
  - Total: 3.48 km^{2} (1.34 sq mi)
- Elevation: 701 m (2,300 ft)

Population (December 2020)
  - Total: 476
  - Density: 137/km^{2} (354/sq mi)

Schwändi is a village, and former municipality, in the municipality of Glarus Süd and canton of Glarus in Switzerland.

== History ==
Schwändi is first mentioned in 1350 as Swendi.

On 1 January 2011, Schwändi became part of the new municipality of Glarus Süd.

== Geography ==
Aerial view from 400 m by Walter Mittelholzer (1923)

The village of Sool is situated at an elevation of 701 m (2,300 ft) on the west side of the valley of the Linth river. The villages of Schwanden and Mitlödi lie below it, by the river.

Schwändi has an area, as defined by the former municipal boundaries in 2006, of 3.5 km^{2} (1.4 sq mi). The area extends to the west of the village to the peak of the Vorder Glärnisch (2,327 m or 7,635 ft). Of this area, 33% is used for agricultural purposes, while 27.6% is forested. Of the rest of the land, 4% is settled (buildings or roads) and the remainder (35.3%) is non-productive (rivers, glaciers or mountains).

== Transport ==
The Sernftalbus operates an hourly bus service linking Schwändi with Schwanden railway station. At Schwanden railway station, a connecting railway service runs to the capital of the canton of Glarus, the town of Glarus.

== Demographics ==
Schwändi has a population (as of 31 December 2020) of 476. As of 2007, 8.4% of the population was made up of foreign nationals. Over the last 10 years the population has grown at a rate of 10.7%. Most of the population (as of 2000) speaks German (97.7%), with French being second most common ( 0.5%) and English being third ( 0.5%).

In the 2007 federal election the most popular party was the SPS which received 64.8% of the vote. Most of the rest of the votes went to the SVP with 29.7% of the vote.

In Schwändi about 79.1% of the population (between age 25-64) have completed either non-mandatory upper secondary education or additional higher education (either University or a Fachhochschule).

Schwändi has an unemployment rate of 1.41%. As of 2005, there were 18 people employed in the primary economic sector and about 7 businesses involved in this sector. 10 people are employed in the secondary sector and there are 3 businesses in this sector. 15 people are employed in the tertiary sector, with 7 businesses in this sector.
