= Elm, Switzerland =

Elm
- Village (and former municipality)
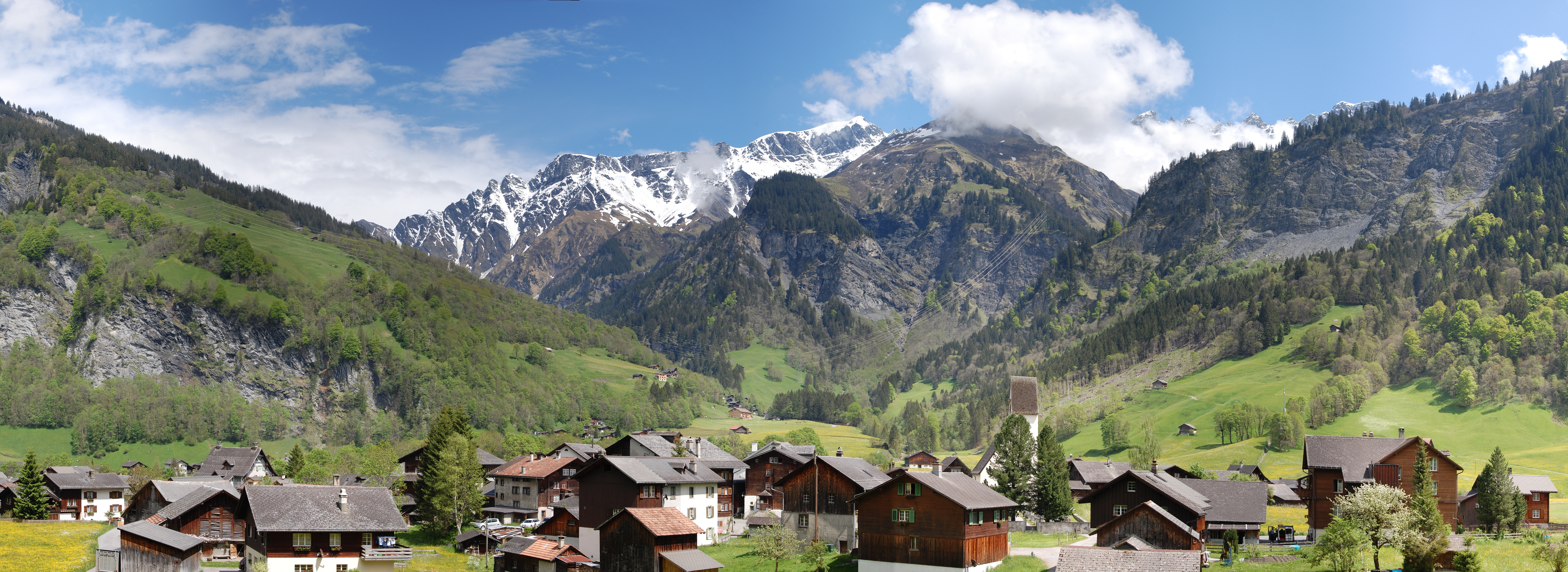

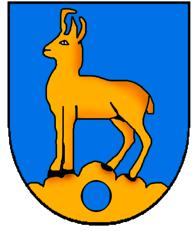
- Coat of arms

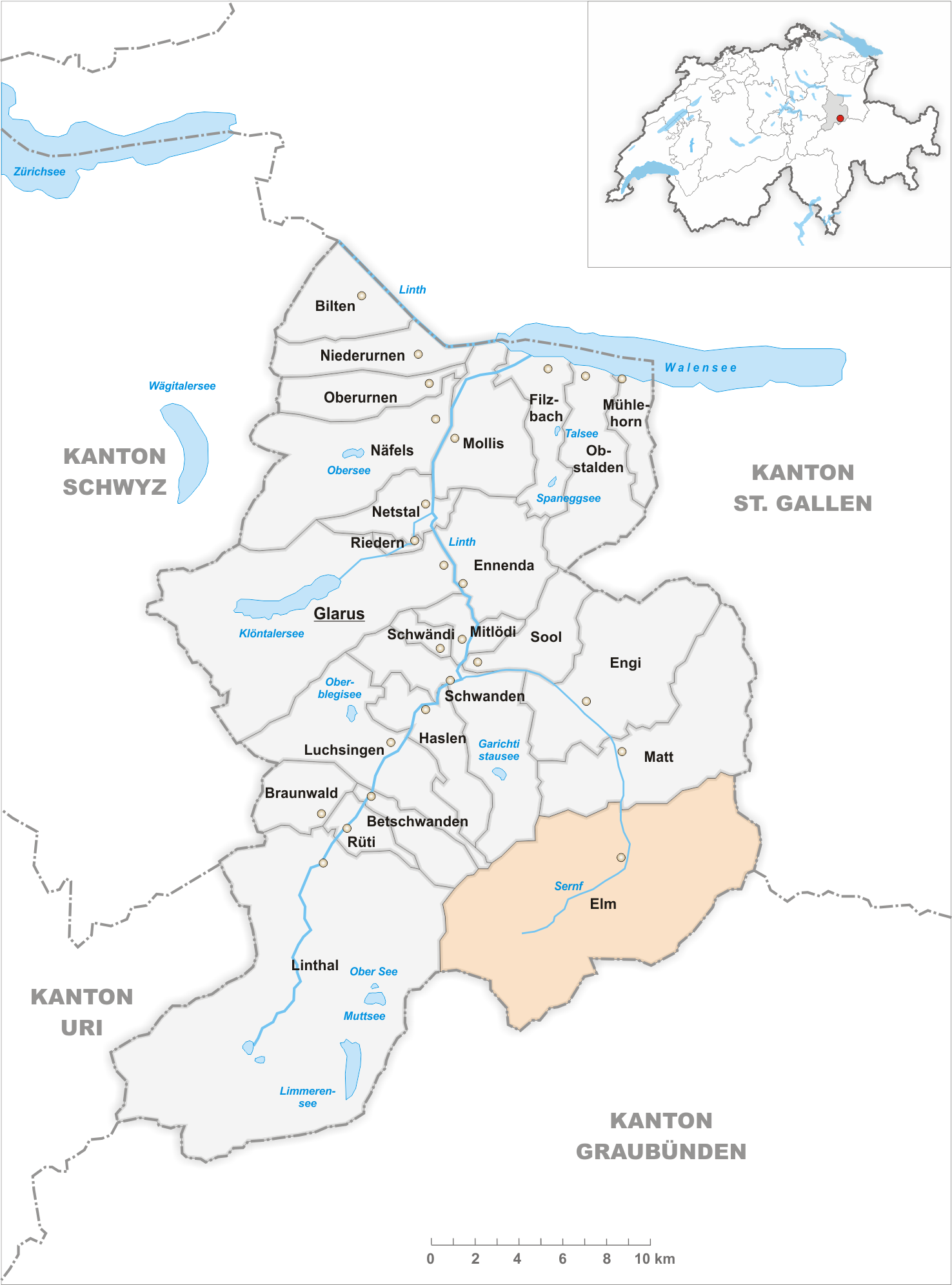
- The former municipal area (2007)
- Coordinates: 46°55′N 9°10′E
- Country: Switzerland
- Canton: Glarus
- Municipality: Glarus Süd

Area
  - Total: 90.73 km^{2} (35.03 sq mi)
- Elevation: 977 m (3,205 ft)

Population (December 2020)
  - Total: 626
  - Density: 6.90/km^{2} (17.9/sq mi)

Elm (Romansh: Dialma) is a village, and former municipality, in the municipality of Glarus Süd and canton of Glarus in Switzerland. Elm lies in the valley of the Sernf river, and consists of the village of Elm itself, and the hamlets of Sulzbach, Schwändi, Müsli, Untertal, Vogelsang, Töniberg, Obmoos, Steinibach and Wald.

== History ==
Aerial view from 300 m by Walter Mittelholzer (1923)

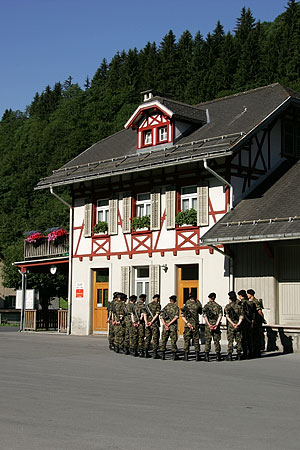
Former tramway station in Elm

Elm is first mentioned in 1344 as Elme.

The baths at Wichlen were in use since the Middle Ages and are first mentioned in 1547. They were very popular until they were buried by an avalanche in 1762. Many characteristic wooden structures have survived.

In 1799, Russian General Alexander Suvorov and his troops stayed the night in Elm before crossing Panix Pass to Pigniu on their retreat into Austria.

By 1861, slate quarrying was taking place. On September 11, 1881, an avalanche caused by excessive quarrying of slate killed 114 and buried 83 structures in the municipality.

In 1892, the owner of a spring in Elm that had long been hailed as beneficial was found to be rich in iron. The owner opened a bath house and sold the water bottled in demijohns, but the bath house was destroyed in an avalanche in 1907. In 1898, a new Kurhaus was opened, which flourished until World War I. Today, it is used as a retirement centre. In 1929, the company Mineralquellen Elm AG was founded to bottle the spring water, and this continues to this day.

In 1879, the valley of the Linth river was connected to the Swiss railway network by the opening of the Swiss Northeastern Railway line from Weesen, but Elm, in the side-valley of the Sernf river, remained unserved. This impacted the local economy, and various proposals were brought forward to provide rail service to the Sernf valley. Eventually, on 8 July 1905, the Sernftal tramway, a metre gauge roadside electric tramway, was opened connecting Schwanden with Elm and other intermediate communities. Service on this line continued until 31 May 1969, when it was replaced by road services.

On 1 January 2011, Matt became part of the new municipality of Glarus Süd.

== Geography ==
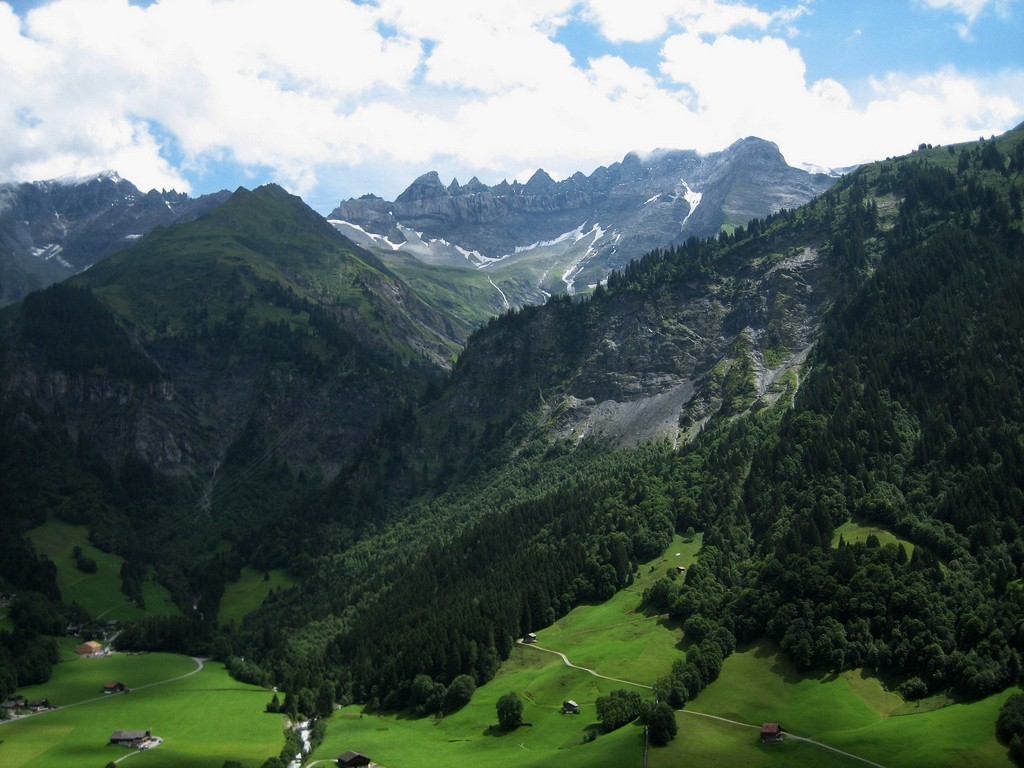
Sernftal valley

The village of Elm is situated at an elevation of 977 m (3,205 ft) on the left bank of the Sernf river. It is the farthest village upstream in the valley of the Sernf, with the village of Matt downstream and to the north. Elm lies on the road from Schwanden, although the road continues higher up the valley to various isolated settlements.

Elm lies at the entrance to Panix Pass, which crosses the Alps into the canton of Graubünden. The village is also the starting point of the trail across Foo Pass to the village of Weisstannen in the canton of St. Gallen, and of the trail across the Richetli Pass, to the village of Linthal, in the adjoining valley of the Linth river. Both these trails forms part of the Alpine Pass Route, a hiking trail which passes through Elm on its journey from Sargans to Montreux.

Elm has an area, as defined by the former municipal boundaries in 2006, of 90.7 km^{2} (35.0 sq mi), covering a considerable area on each side of the river to head of the valley. Of this area, 34.1% is used for agricultural purposes, while 18.4% is forested. Of the rest of the land, 0.8% is settled (buildings or roads) and the remainder (46.7%) is non-productive (rivers, glaciers or mountains).

Elm is well known for its phenomenon about the sunlight shining through the "Martin Hole" in the mountain (Tschingelhoren). Several times during Spring, 12 and 13 March and 30 September and 1 October in Fall, the sun shines for about one minute onto the area around the church attracting many observers. It is like a giant floodlight.

== Demographics ==
Elm has a population (as of 31 December 2020) of 626. As of 2007, 4.8% of the population was made up of foreign nationals. Over the last 10 years the population has decreased at a rate of -16.9%. Most of the population (as of 2000) speaks German (96.5%), with Portuguese being second most common ( 1.4%) and Serbo-Croatian being third ( 0.8%).

In the 2007 federal election the most popular party was the SPS which received 53.8% of the vote. Most of the rest of the votes went to the SVP with 38.5% of the vote.

In Elm about 57.6% of the population (between age 25-64) have completed either non-mandatory upper secondary education or additional higher education (either University or a Fachhochschule).

The population of Elm has held steady since the 18th century, reaching a peak in the middle of the 19th century, as shown in the following table:

Year	Population
1730	516
1789	765
1850	1051
1900	913
1950	867
1990	791

== Religion ==
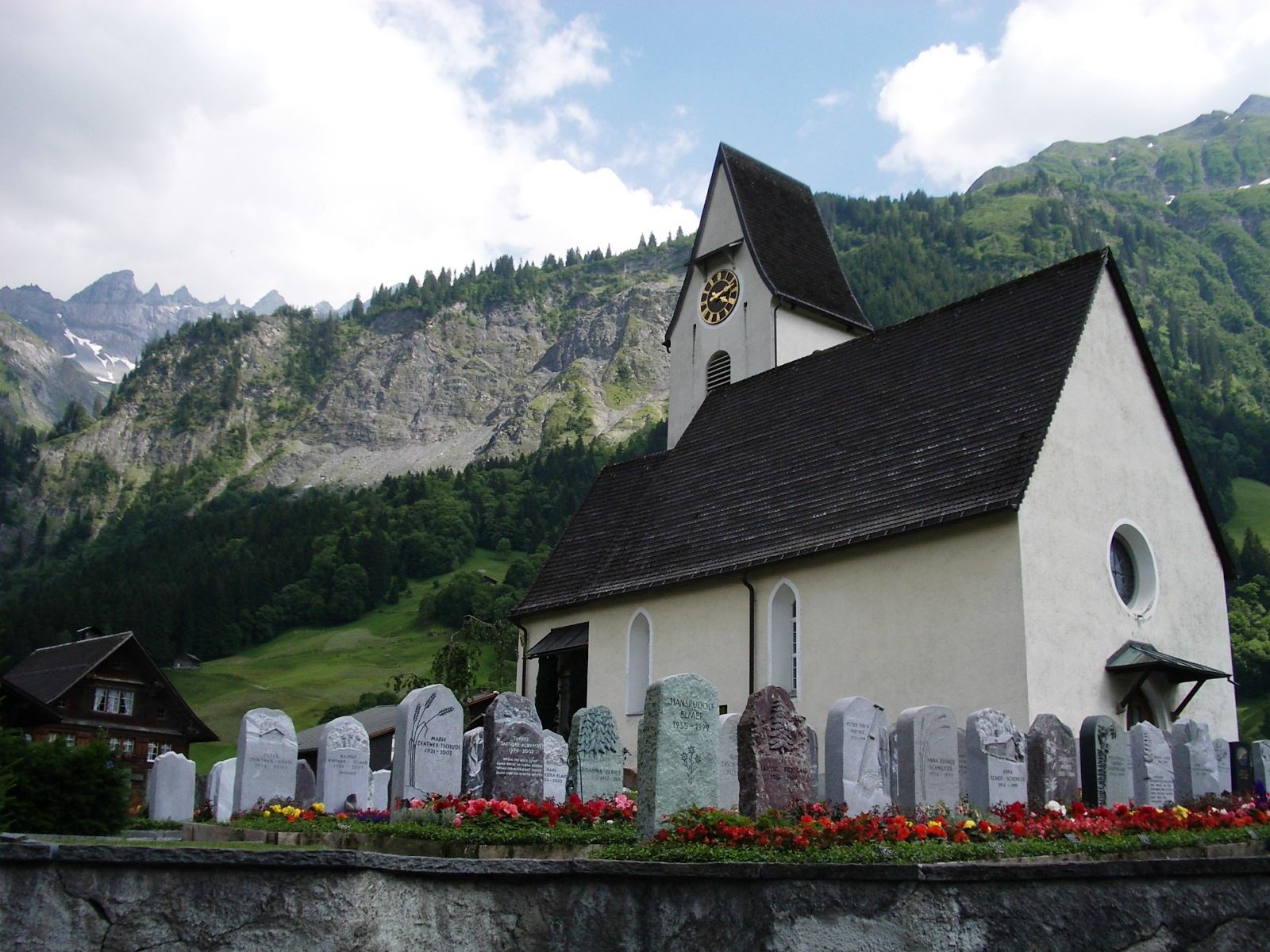
Church of Elm

Elm originally belonged to the parish of Glarus, but in 1273, a new parish was formed in Matt. In 1493, Elm received a papal dispensation to establish a new parish. On March 22, 1528, the Reformation reached Elm, and the church was stripped of its ornaments. In 1594, the parish was separated from the parish of Matt.

== Economy ==
The major occupation of Elm has been agriculture, including sheepherding since 1000. In the 18th century, the wool industry (home-based) became an important economic factor. In the 17th and early 18th centuries, beef cattle were pastured in the Alps in summer for export to Italy.

From 1929 to the present, the only industry in Elm has been the production of the mineral water, initially by the company Mineralquellen Elm AG and now by RAMSEIER Suisse AG. The plant specialises in the production of the brands of ELMER Citro and ELMER Mineral.

Elm has an unemployment rate of 0.08%. As of 2005, there were 117 people employed in the primary economic sector and about 50 businesses involved in this sector. 58 people are employed in the secondary sector and there are 8 businesses in this sector. 189 people are employed in the tertiary sector, with 32 businesses in this sector.

== Transport ==
The Sernftalbus operates an hourly bus service linking Elm with other communities down the valley of the Sernf river as far as Schwanden railway station. The service replaces the Sernftal tramway that operated between 1905 and 1969, over a similar route. At Schwanden railway station, a connecting railway service runs to the capital of the canton of Glarus, the town of Glarus.

== Tourism ==
The ski resort on the Schitzer opened in 1973, and the Pleus was opened for skiing in 1982.

Part of the geologic UNESCO World Heritage Site, Swiss Tectonic Arena Sardona is a mountain cliff called Tschingelhörner located between Elm and Flims.

== Climate ==
Elm features a warm summer humid continental climate (Dfb) according to the Köppen climate classification. Between 1991 and 2020 Elm had an average of 152.4 days of rain per year and on average received 1,588 mm (62.5 in) of precipitation. The wettest month was August during which time Elm received an average of 194 mm (7.6 in) of precipitation. During this month there was precipitation for an average of 15.3 days. The month with the most days of precipitation was June, with an average of 15.8, but with only 165 mm (6.5 in) of precipitation. The driest month of the year was February with an average of 90 mm (3.5 in) of precipitation over 10.3 days.

Climate data for Elm village, elevation 958 m (3,143 ft), (1991–2020)
Month	Jan	Feb	Mar	Apr	May	Jun	Jul	Aug	Sep	Oct	Nov	Dec	Year
Mean daily maximum °C (°F)	1.9 (35.4)	3.0 (37.4)	7.5 (45.5)	12.0 (53.6)	16.4 (61.5)	19.5 (67.1)	21.0 (69.8)	20.4 (68.7)	16.5 (61.7)	12.8 (55.0)	6.6 (43.9)	2.5 (36.5)	11.7 (53.1)
Daily mean °C (°F)	−1.8 (28.8)	−1.1 (30.0)	2.5 (36.5)	6.7 (44.1)	10.8 (51.4)	14.0 (57.2)	15.6 (60.1)	15.3 (59.5)	11.6 (52.9)	7.9 (46.2)	2.7 (36.9)	−0.9 (30.4)	6.9 (44.4)
Mean daily minimum °C (°F)	−5.6 (21.9)	−5.4 (22.3)	−1.8 (28.8)	1.7 (35.1)	5.8 (42.4)	9.2 (48.6)	10.9 (51.6)	10.9 (51.6)	7.3 (45.1)	3.8 (38.8)	−0.9 (30.4)	−4.5 (23.9)	2.6 (36.7)
Average precipitation mm (inches)	103.0 (4.06)	90.5 (3.56)	114.4 (4.50)	104.9 (4.13)	140.2 (5.52)	162.9 (6.41)	183.8 (7.24)	194.3 (7.65)	141.6 (5.57)	115.9 (4.56)	120.0 (4.72)	116.7 (4.59)	1,588.2 (62.53)
Average snowfall cm (inches)	85.1 (33.5)	85.8 (33.8)	60.3 (23.7)	33.6 (13.2)	3.3 (1.3)	0.1 (0.0)	0.0 (0.0)	0.0 (0.0)	0.2 (0.1)	12.2 (4.8)	52.3 (20.6)	82.5 (32.5)	415.4 (163.5)
Average precipitation days (≥ 1.0 mm)	11.2	10.3	12.4	11.7	14.8	15.3	15.4	15.3	12.2	10.6	11.4	11.8	152.4
Average snowy days (≥ 1.0 cm)	9.1	8.9	7.0	3.9	0.7	0.0	0.0	0.0	0.1	1.2	5.8	9.3	46.0
Average relative humidity (%)	75	73	72	69	73	77	79	80	81	78	78	78	76
Source 1: NOAA
Source 2: MeteoSwiss

== Culture ==
In 1981, the Wakker Prize was awarded to Elm for the development and preservation of its architectural heritage.

== Notable people ==
- Swiss ski mountaineer Rico Elmer was born in Elm.
- Swiss ski racer Vreni Schneider, an olympic gold and world champion in slalom and giant slalom, was born in Elm in 1964.
