= Sernftal =

Valley in Glarus, Switzerland

Coordinates: 46.961°N 9.171°E

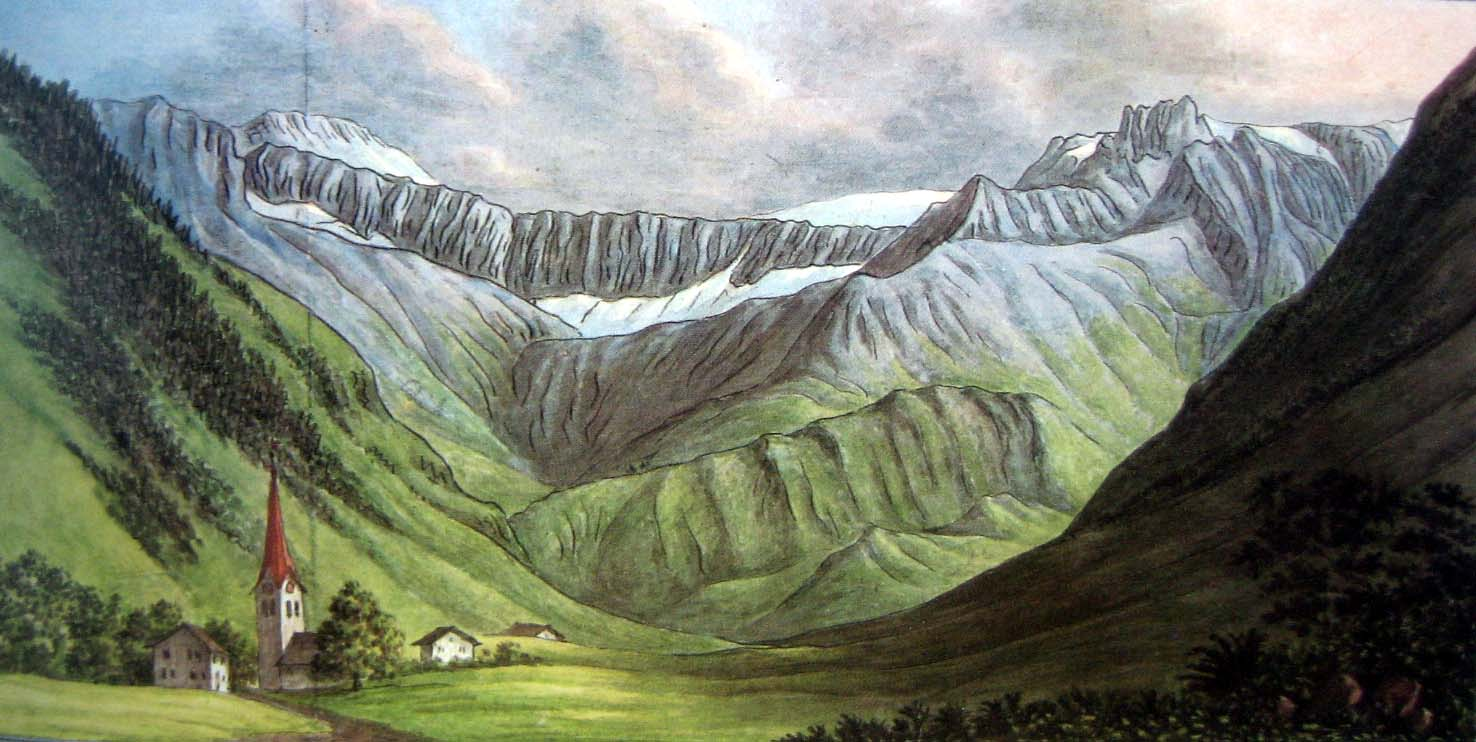
Matt im Sernftal 13 July 1811, painting by Hans Conrad Escher von der Linth

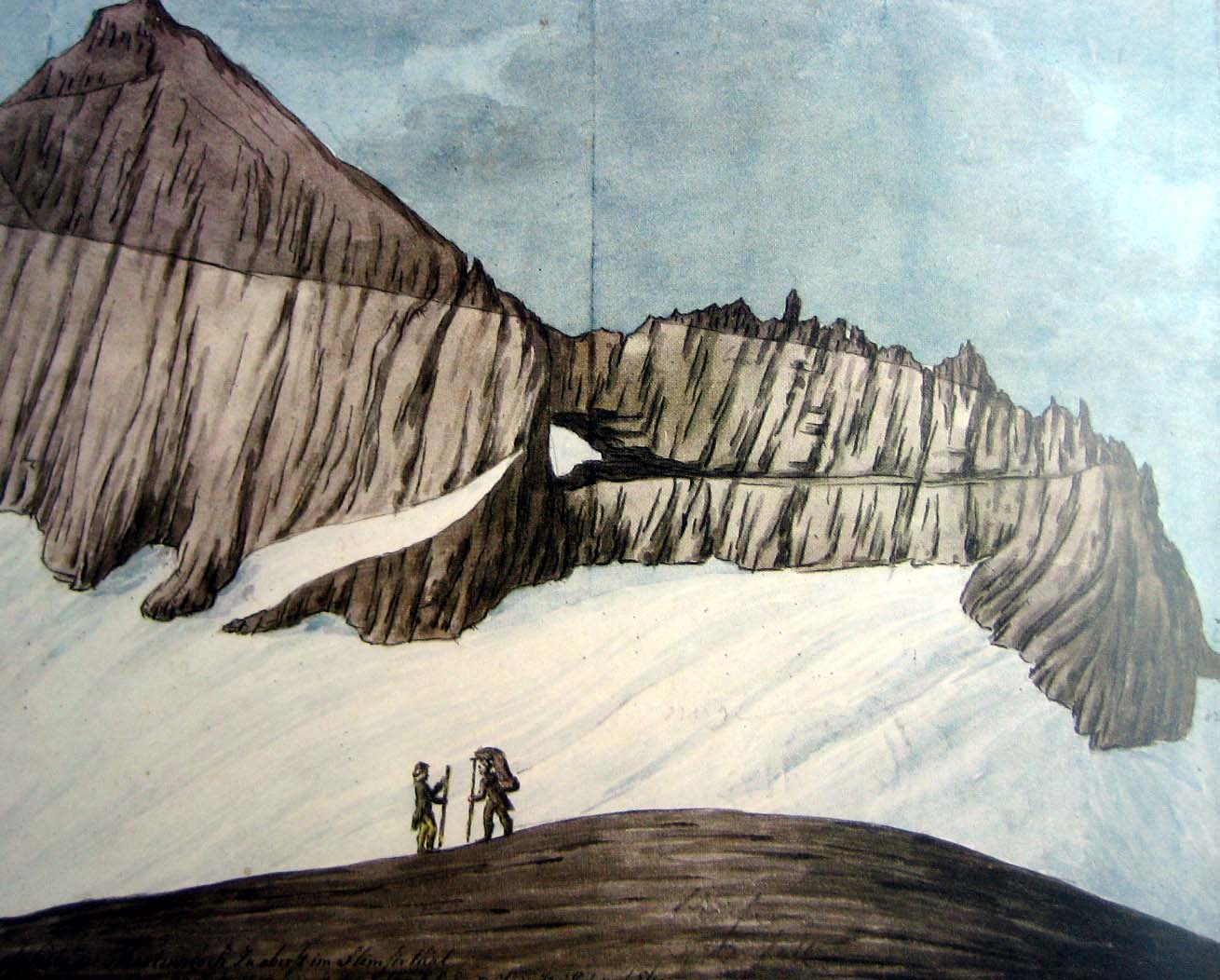
Glarner Hauptüberschiebung, Martinsloch, painting by Hans Conrad Escher von der Linth

The Sernftal or Kleintal is an alpine valley within Glarus Süd, in the canton of Glarus, Switzerland. It is formed by the Sernf, a right tributary of the Linth. Situated in the Sernftal are the villages of Elm (977 m) and Engi (812 m). The Panix Pass at 2407 m connects the Sernftal with the anterior Rhine valley in Grisons.

== Geography ==
The valley is the site of an important geological feature of the Glarus Alps, the Glarner Hauptüberschiebung, a notable fault in alpine geology. A scale model of the feature is on exhibit in the American Museum of Natural History.

== Name ==
The name Sernf (earlier also Sernft) is of pre-Germanic origin, either Celtic or an example of Old European hydronymy. It derives from a hypothetical *Sarnivos, containing a PIE root *ser "to flow".

The name of the Sernf river has received some attention in German online culture as the "fifth German word in -nf", popularized by Bastian Sick in his Spiegel Online blog. The word fünf "five" is the only genuinely German word with this ending, the others are early loanwords, including Hanf "hemp" (from kánnabis) and Senf "mustard" (from sinapis), and the toponym Genf "Geneva", from Genava.

== See also ==
- List of valleys of the Alps
- List of rivers of Switzerland
