= Glarner Sprinter =

Rail service in Switzerland

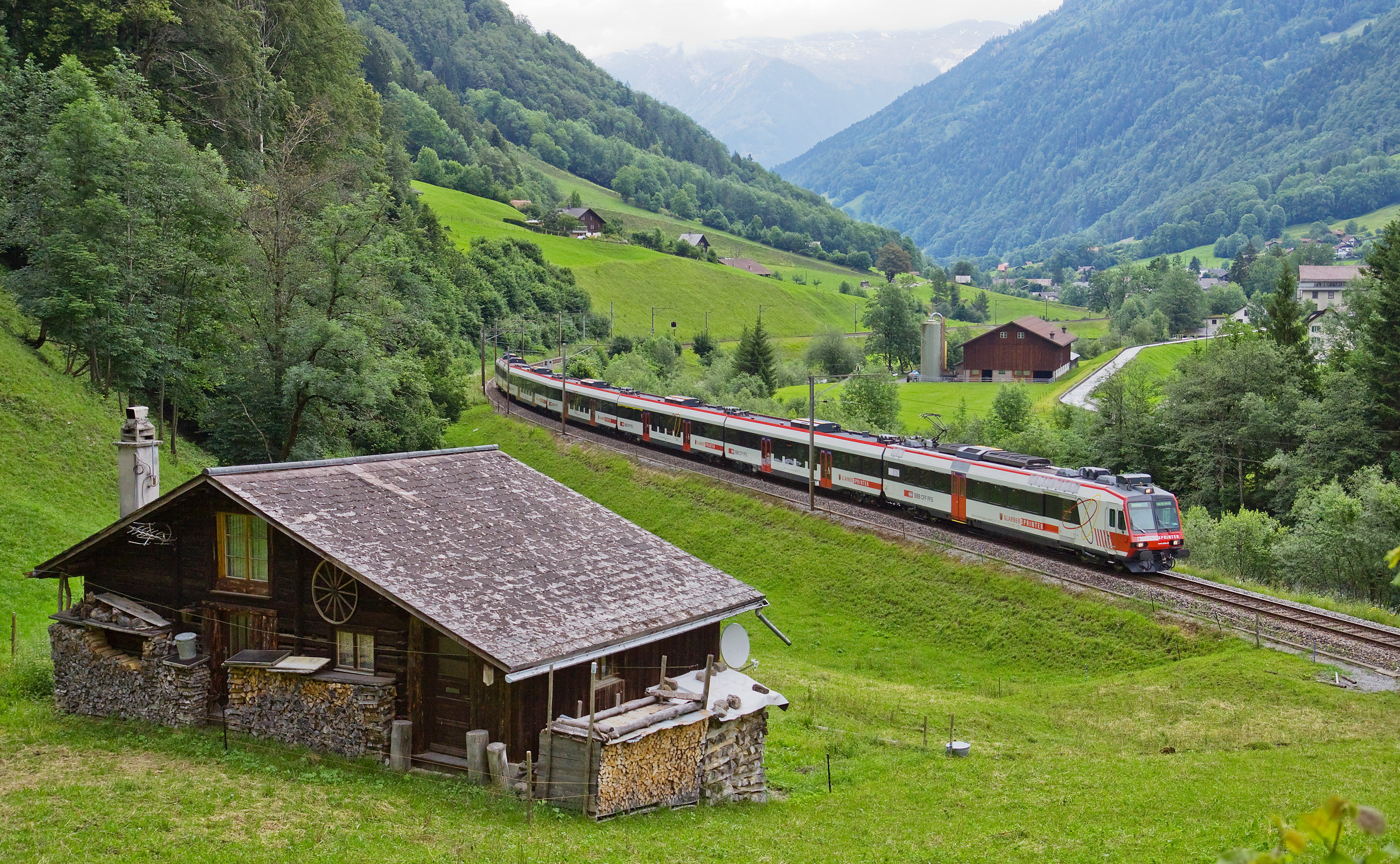
- Glarner Sprinter train near Linthal

Overview
- Service type: RegioExpress
- Current operator: Swiss Federal Railways

Route
- Termini: Zurich; Canton of Glarus
- Service frequency: Varies

On-board services
- Classes: First and second class

Technical
- Track gauge: 1,435 mm (4 ft 8 1/2 in)
- Electrification: 15 kV 16.7 Hz AC Overhead

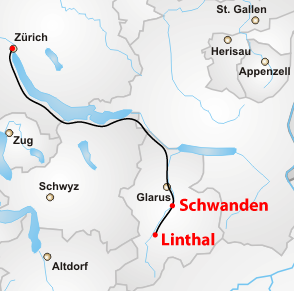
Overview of the train's route

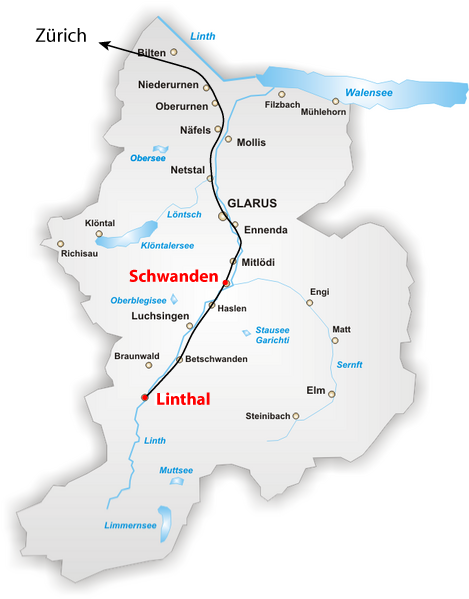
Detailed route within the Canton of Glarus

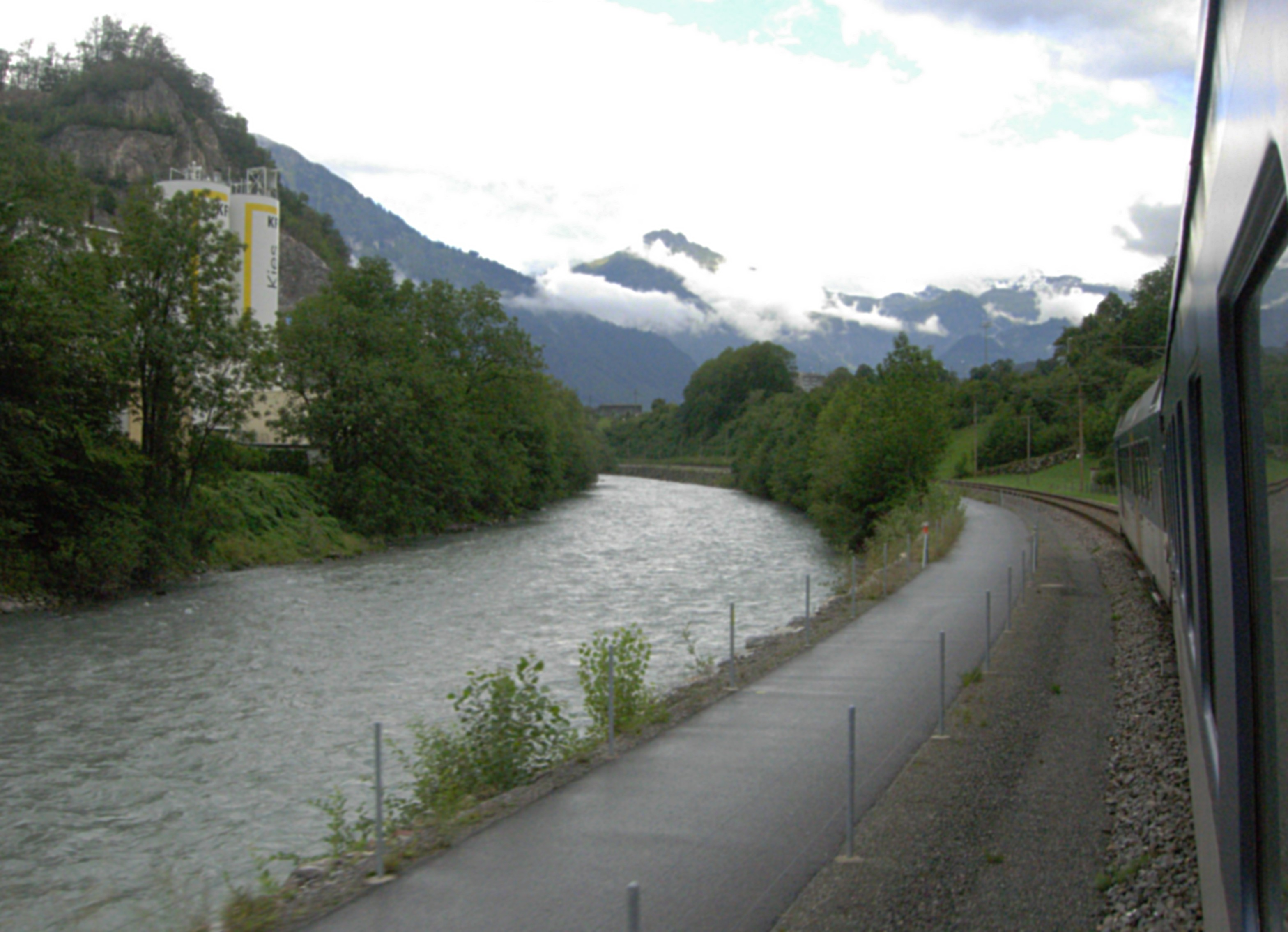
Looking upstream along the Linth River between Netstal and Glarus, as seen from the train

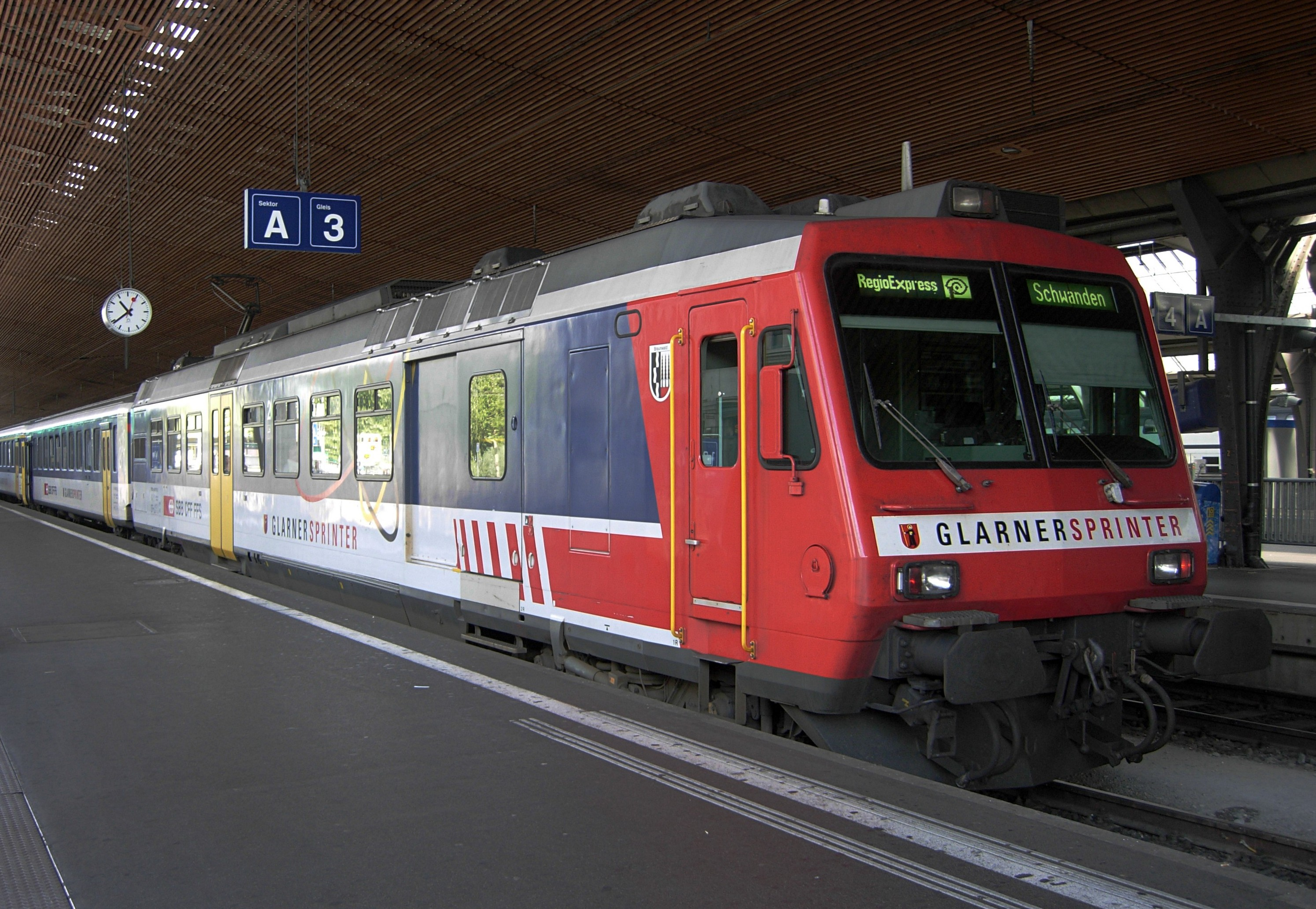
A previous generation Glarner Sprinter train awaiting its next departure from Zürich HB. Elements of the special paint scheme can be seen on the front and side of the locomotive.

The Glarner Sprinter was a named passenger train of the Swiss Federal Railways (SBB). It ran from Zurich into the canton of Glarus, and was operated as a RegioExpress service. The train provided a commuter service for passengers travelling from the towns and villages of Glarus to the greater Zurich region, whilst also providing a tourist connection (for winter sports, hiking, mountain climbing, etc.) in the opposite direction. In July 2014 it was replaced by a more frequent service as part of the Zürich S-Bahn, the S25.

== History ==
Since 1918, there was no longer a direct connection from the Canton of Glarus to Zurich. The "Glarner Dream" of a direct connection to Zürich was realized by the Pendlerverein (commuter association) of the Glarus government and the SBB as a component of the Swiss Bahn 2000 modernization plan and put into service on 12 April 2004. The plan was for an hourly service, but this could not be achieved due to financial problems in the canton Glarus and technical problems on the part of the SBB.

The Glarner Sprinter ceased operation in July 2014. It was replaced by a more frequent hourly service as part of the Zürich S-Bahn, designated as the S25. Like the Glarner Sprinter, the S25 runs express to Ziegelbrücke, but it is an hourly service and all trains serve all stops to Linthal.

== Route and schedule ==
After leaving Zurich, the Glarner Sprinter ran along the west side of Lake Zürich, stopping only at Pfäffikon and Ziegelbrücke. From Ziegelbrücke it followed the valley of the Linth River, stopping at all intermediate stations including those for Glarus Town and Schwanden. On weekends and public holidays, the train then ran without stopping to Linthal; on other days it terminated at Schwanden.

The train served the following stations:

- Zürich HB
- Pfäffikon SZ
- Lachen
- Siebnen-Wangen
- Ziegelbrücke
- Nieder- und Oberurnen
- Näfels-Mollis
- Netstal
- Glarus
- Ennenda (not weekends and public holidays)
- Mitlödi (not weekends and public holidays)
- Schwanden
- Linthal Braunwaldbahn (weekends and public holidays only)
- Linthal (weekends and public holidays only)

On working days, the train ran every two hours. On weekends and on public holidays, the train made two return trips each day. The trip from Zürich to Schwanden took from 1 hour and 5 minutes to 1 hour and 7 minutes; to Linthal, from 1 hour and 19 minutes to 1 hour and 33 minutes.

== Motive power ==
The usual motive power on this route was two modernized RBDe 560 «NPZ Domino» dedicated to this route with special Glarner Sprinter livery (RBDe 560 DO GLS 201 and 202). Four Inova coaches (two second class, two first and second class) as well as a first class At control car made up the rest of the consist.

Prior to the current units, a pair of unmoderminised units (RBDe 560 120 "Netstal" and 560 123 "Braunwald") were used, again in a special livery. Occasionally, Glarner Sprinter services are carried out with RABe 514 electrical multiple units or Re 450 powered push-pull trains. In the past, a consist made up of two RBe 540 on either end of a set of Einheitswagen I/II cars were sometimes used as replacement.
