= Luchsingen-Hätzingen railway station =

Railway station in Switzerland

Luchsingen-Hätzingen
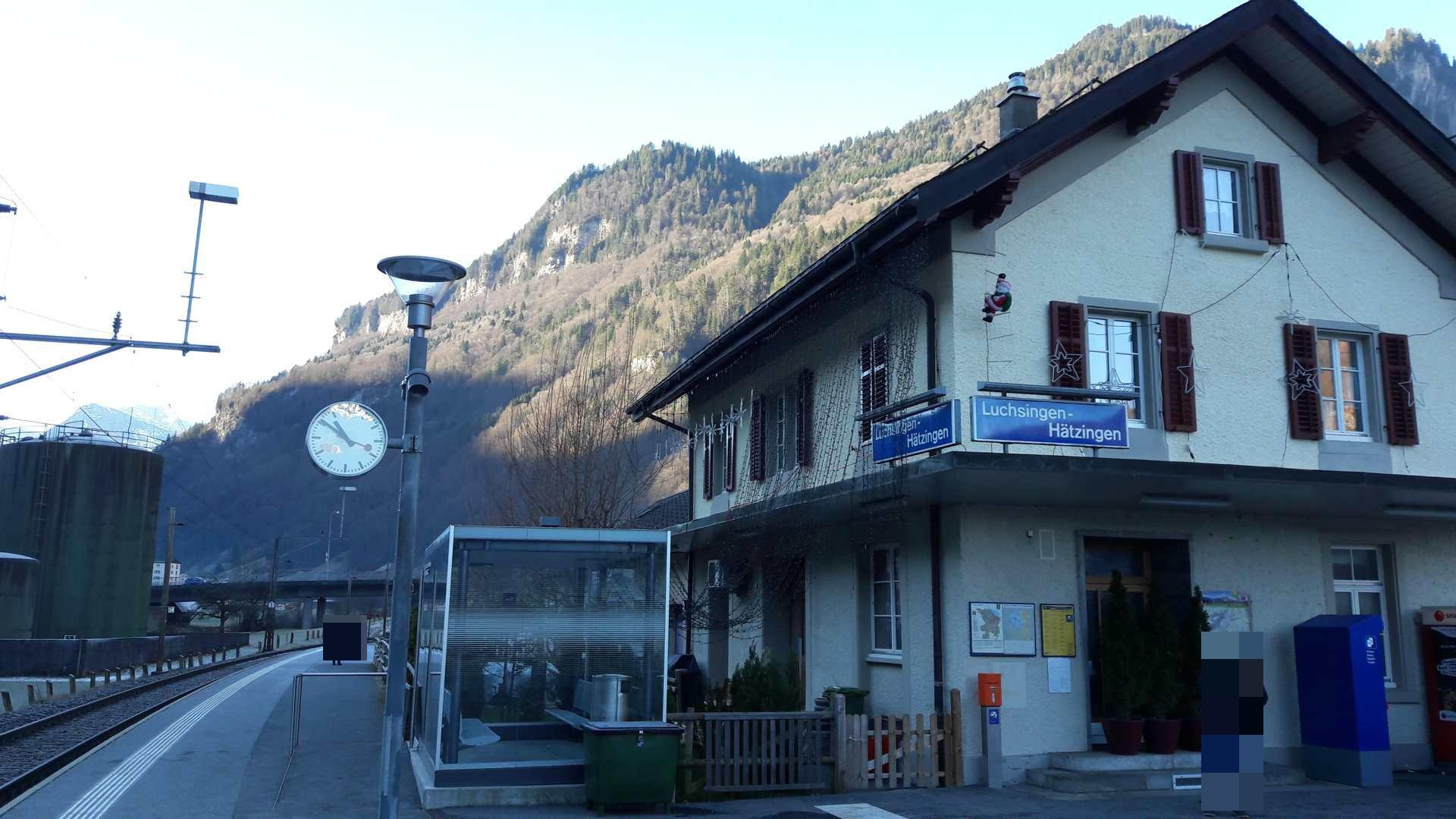
- Luchsingen-Hätzingen railway station

General information
- Location: Bahnhofstrasse; Luchsingen; Glarus Süd, Glarus; Switzerland
- Coordinates: 46.96493°N 9.039334°E
- Elevation: 568 m (1,864 ft)
- Owner: Swiss Federal Railways
- Operator: Swiss Federal Railways
- Line: Weesen-Linthal

Services
| Preceding station | Zurich S-Bahn | Following station |
|---|---|---|
| Leuggelbach towards Zürich HB | S25 | Diesbach-Betschwanden towards Linthal |
Location
- Location within Switzerland

Luchsingen-Hätzingen railway station is a railway station in the municipality of Glarus Süd in the Swiss canton of Glarus. It takes its name from the nearby villages of Luchsingen and Hätzingen. The station is situated on the Weesen to Linthal railway line, and served by the hourly Zürich S-Bahn service S25 between Zurich and Linthal.

== Services ==
As of the December 2023 timetable change, the following services call at Luchsingen-Hätzingen:

- St. Gallen S-Bahn:
  - S6: hourly service between Linthal and Rapperswil via Ziegelbrücke (only during off-peak hours).
- Zürich S-Bahn:
  - S25: hourly service between Linthal and Zürich HB via Ziegelbrücke.
