= Leuggelbach =

- Village (and former municipality)
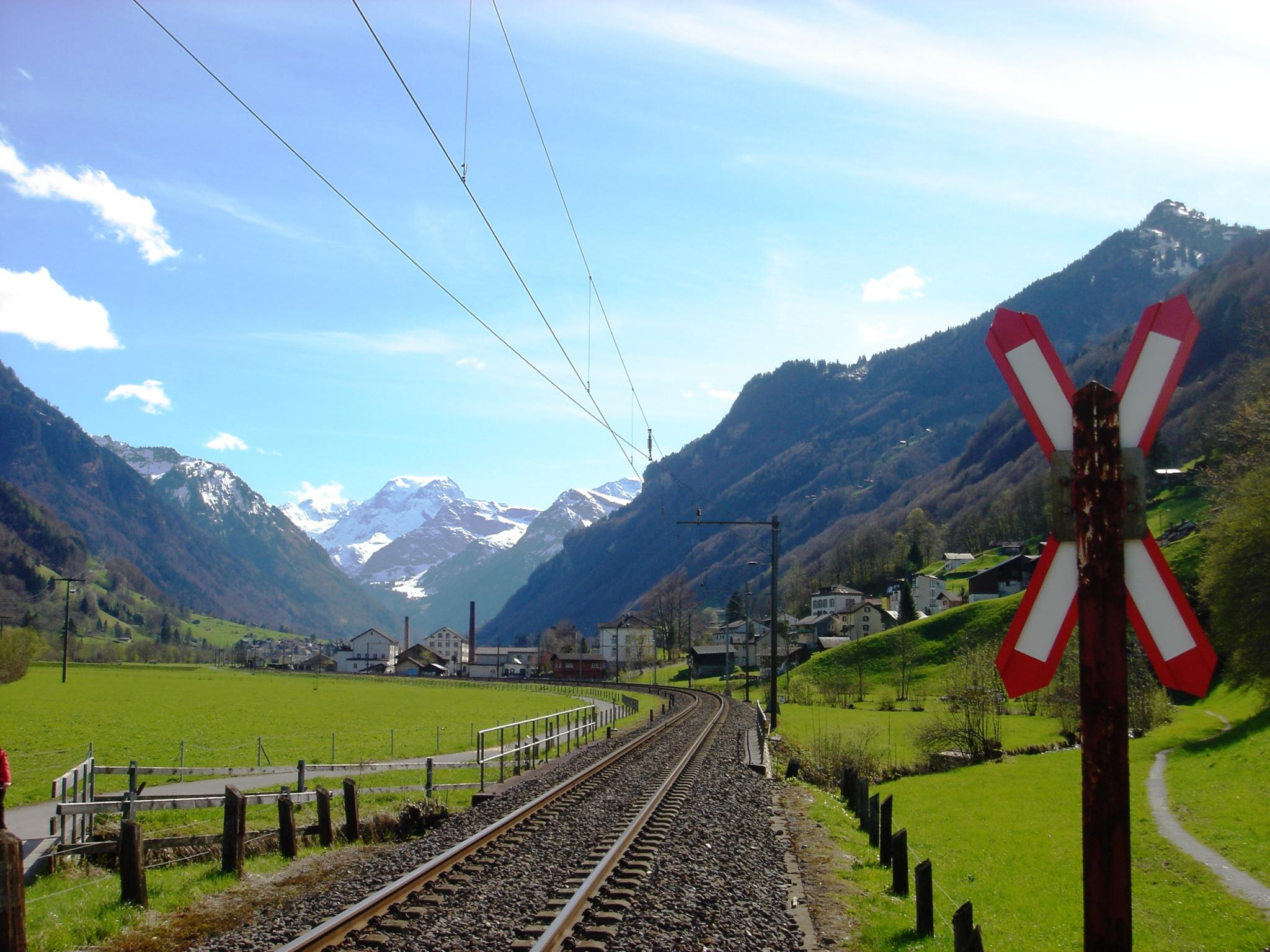
- The village, looking up the valley, as seen from the railway

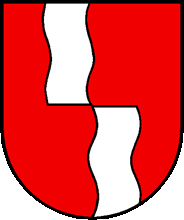
- Coat of arms

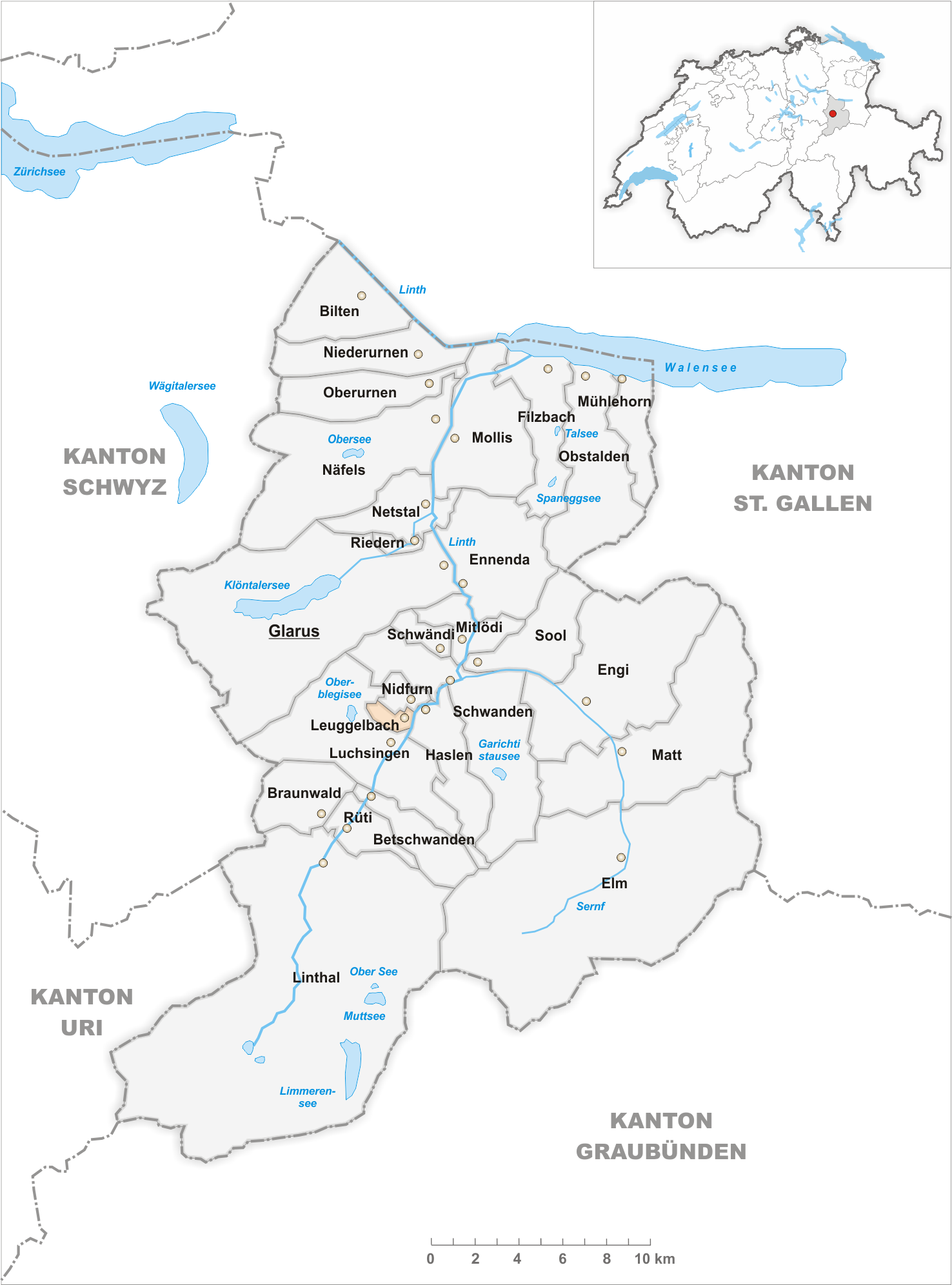
- The former municipal area (2005)
- Coordinates: 46°58′36″N 9°02′50″E
- Country: Switzerland
- Canton: Glarus
- Municipality: Glarus Süd
- Elevation: 554 m (1,818 ft)

Leuggelbach is a village, and former municipality, in the municipality of Glarus Süd and canton of Glarus in Switzerland.

== History ==
Leuggelbach is first mentioned in 1350 as Löckelbach.

Several factories opened in the 19th century, including a calico factory that closed in 1930 and a textile finishing factory that closed in 1993. Today all that remains is a paint and varnish factory, along with some craft enterprises.

On 1 July 2006 the municipality of Leuggelbach was merged into the municipality of Haslen. On 1 January 2011, the municipality of Haslen was itself merged into the new municipality of Glarus Süd.

== Geography ==
Leuggelbach is located in the valley of the Linth river, with the village situated on the west bank of the river at an elevation of approximately 554 m (1,818 ft). Luchsingen lies to the south, Nidfurn is to the north, and Haslen is across the river to the north and east.

== Transport ==
Leuggelbach is located on the Hauptstrasse 17, which runs the length of the canton of Glarus before climbing the Klausen Pass into the canton of Uri, as well as on the Weesen to Linthal railway line that parallels the main road and the Linth river through Glarus. The high alpine Klausen Pass is normally only open to traffic between June and September, and for the rest of the year the road and railway up the valley form the only access to the village. The village is served by Leuggelbach railway station, which is served by the hourly Zürich S-Bahn service S25 between Linthal and Zurich.

== Demographics ==
The historical population of Leuggelbach is given in the following table:

year	population
1837	203
1870	262
1900	199
1950	194
2000	184
