= Luchsingen =

- Village (and former municipality)
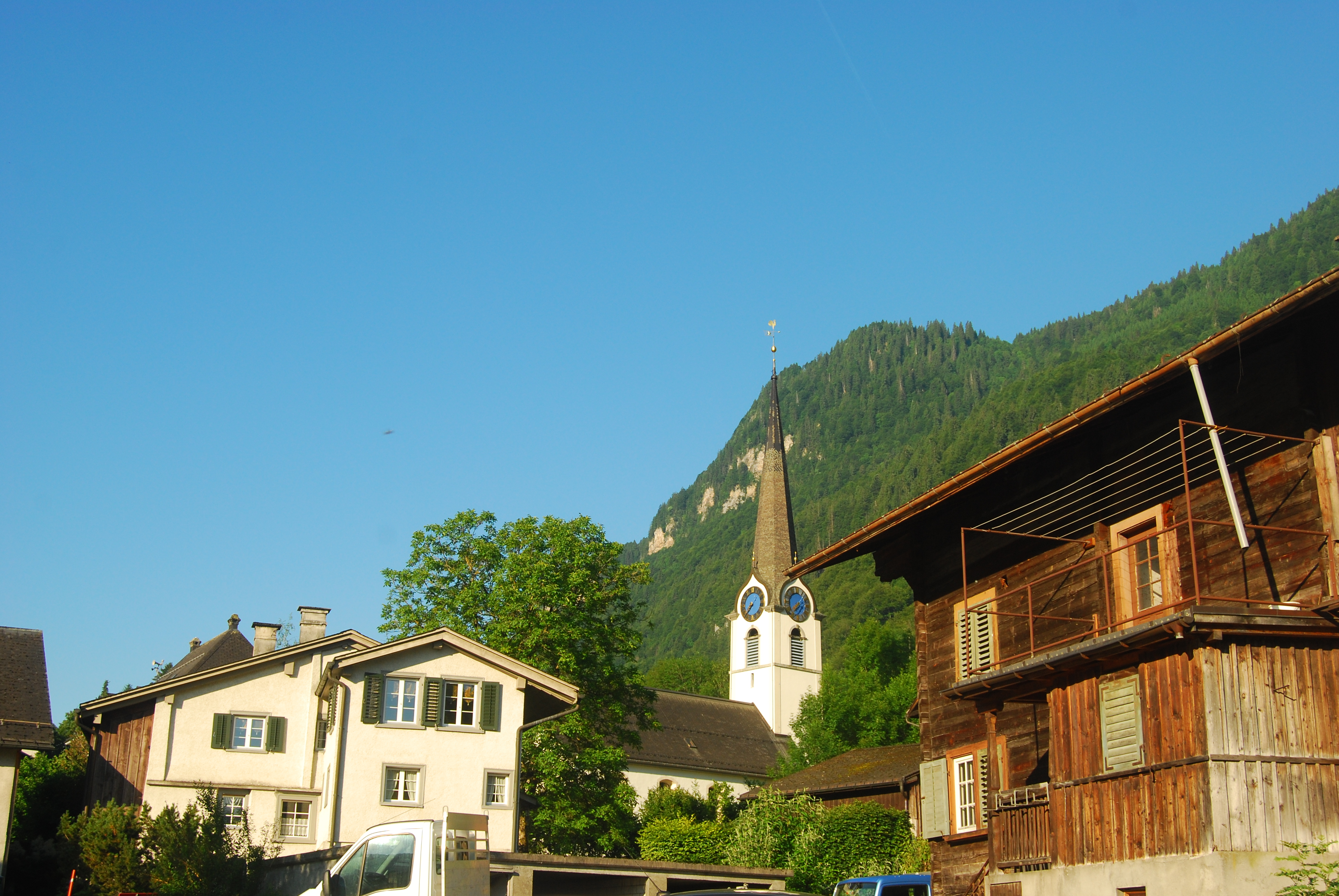

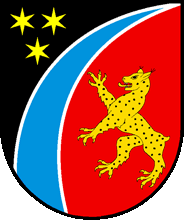
- Coat of arms

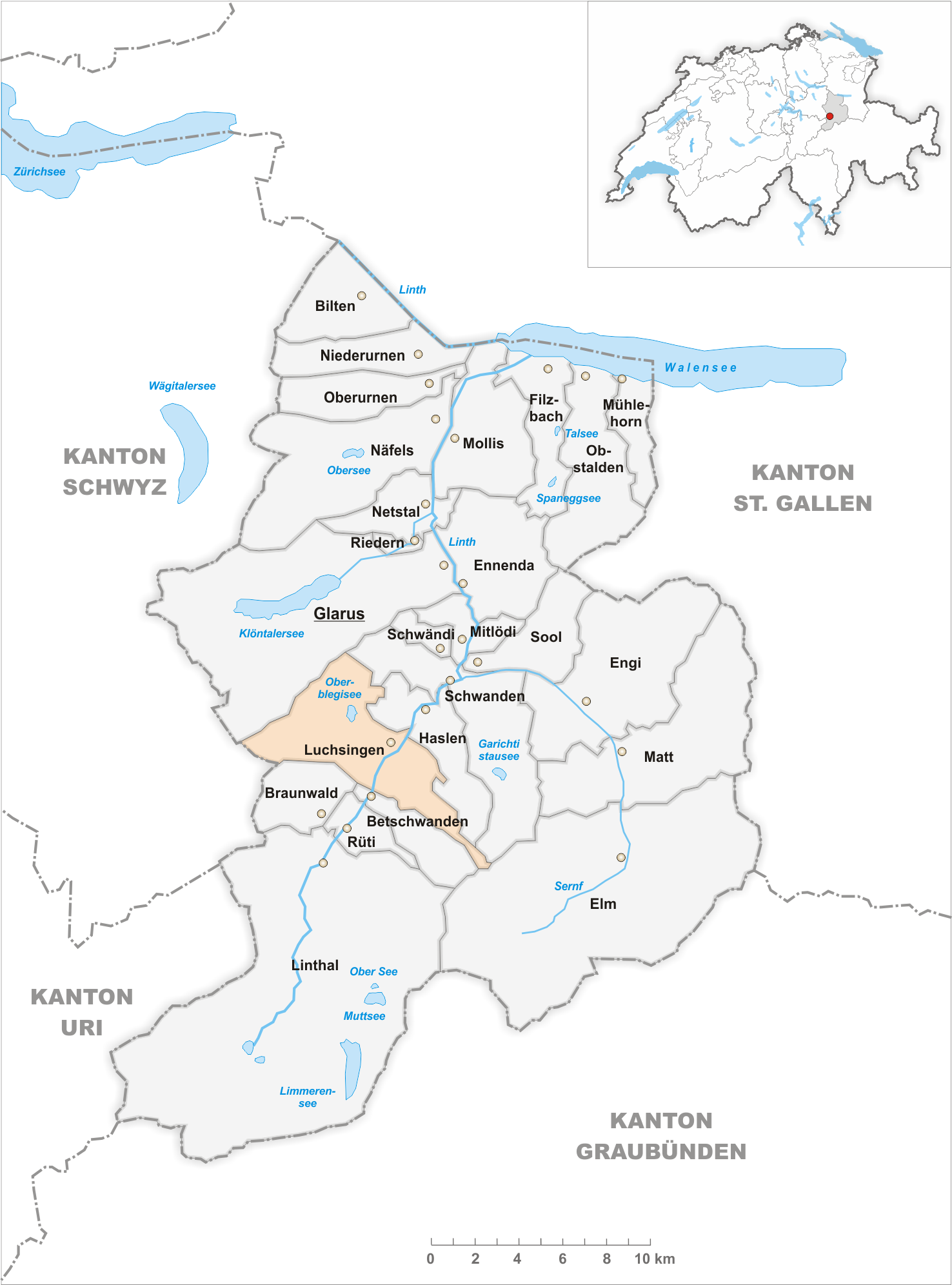
- The former municipal area (2007)
- Coordinates: 46°58′11″N 9°2′20″E
- Country: Switzerland
- Canton: Glarus
- Municipality: Glarus Süd

Area
  - Total: 30.76 km^{2} (11.88 sq mi)
- Elevation: 572 m (1,877 ft)

Population (December 2020)
  - Total: 1,119
  - Density: 36.38/km^{2} (94.22/sq mi)

Luchsingen is a village and former municipality in the municipality of Glarus Süd and canton of Glarus in Switzerland.

== History ==
Aerial view from 300 m by Walter Mittelholzer (1923)

Luchsingen is first mentioned in 1274 as Luchsingen.

In 2004 the former municipalities of Hätzingen and Diesbach were merged into the municipality of Luchsingen. On 1 January 2011, the enlarged municipality became part of the municipality of Glarus Süd.

== Geography ==
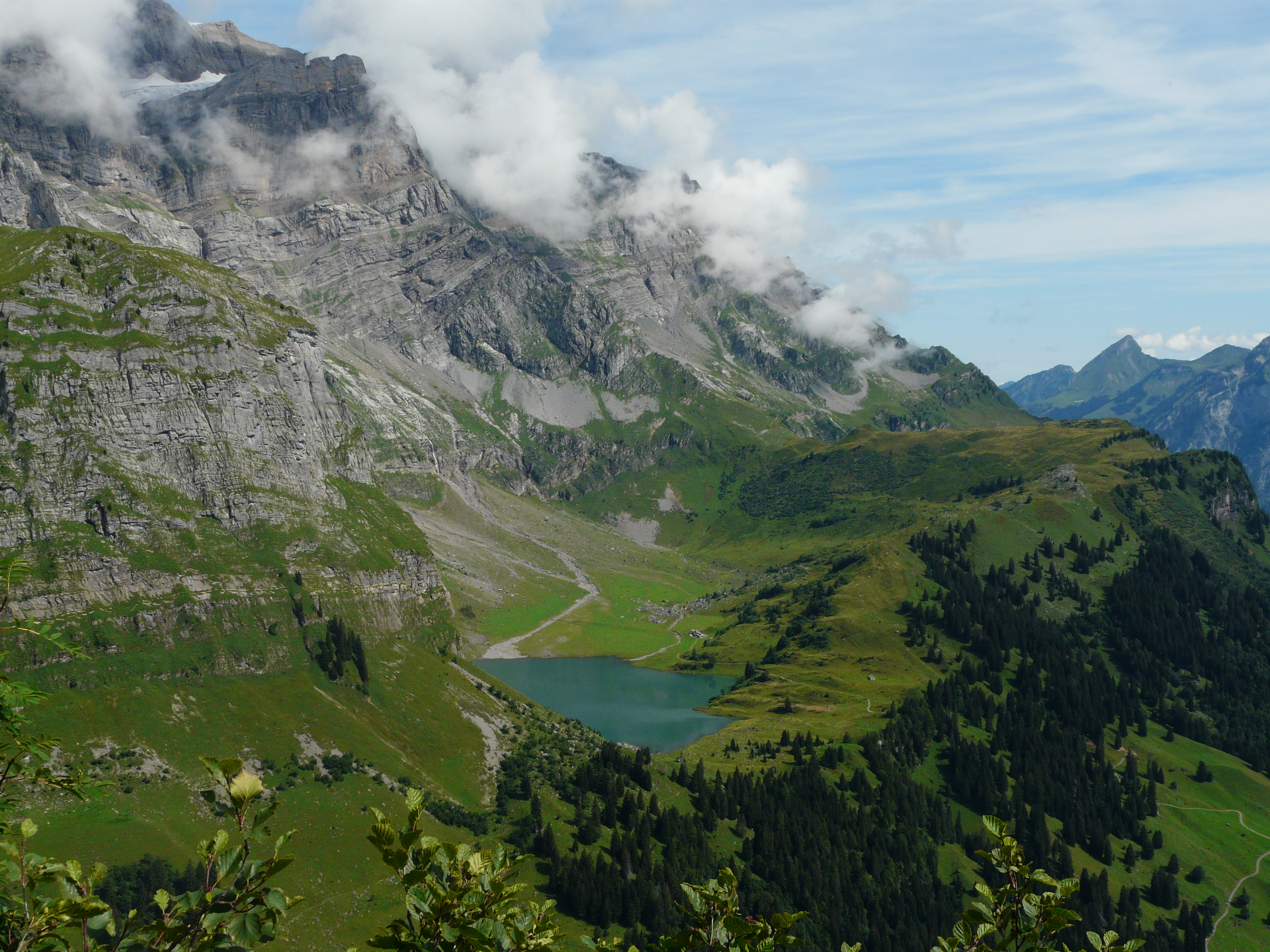
Glärnisch and Oberblegisee above the village

Luchsingen is located in the valley of the Linth river, with the village located on the west bank of the river at an elevation of approximately 572 m (1,877 ft). Leuggelbach lies to the north, whilst Hätzingen lies across the river to the south. Besides the village of Luchsingen, the area includes the hamlet of Adlenbach and the vacation home development of Schlatt. Above the village to the west is the valley of the Bächibach stream and the Oberblegisee lake (at an elevation of 1,422 m or 4,665 ft), which are below the mountains of Eggstock (2,455 m or 8,054 ft), Bös Fulen (2,802 m or 9,193 ft), Rüchigrat (2,657 m or 8,717 ft) and Glärnisch (2,915 m or 9,564 ft).

Luchsingen has an area, as defined by its former municipal boundaries in 2006, of 30.7 km^{2} (11.9 sq mi). Of this area, 26.9% is used for agricultural purposes, while 31.8% is forested. Of the rest of the land, 2% is settled (buildings or roads) and the remainder (39.4%) is non-productive (rivers, glaciers or mountains).

== Transport ==
Luchsingen is located on the Hauptstrasse 17, which runs the length of the canton of Glarus before climbing the Klausen Pass into the canton of Uri, as well as on the Weesen to Linthal railway line that parallels the main road and the Linth river through Glarus. The high alpine Klausen Pass is normally only open to traffic between June and September, and for the rest of the year the road and railway up the valley form the only access to the village. The village is served by Luchsingen-Hätzingen railway station, which is served by the hourly Zürich S-Bahn service S25 between Linthal and Zürich.

Cable cars link Luchsingen with Brunnenberg and Schlatt on the slopes above the village.

== Demographics ==
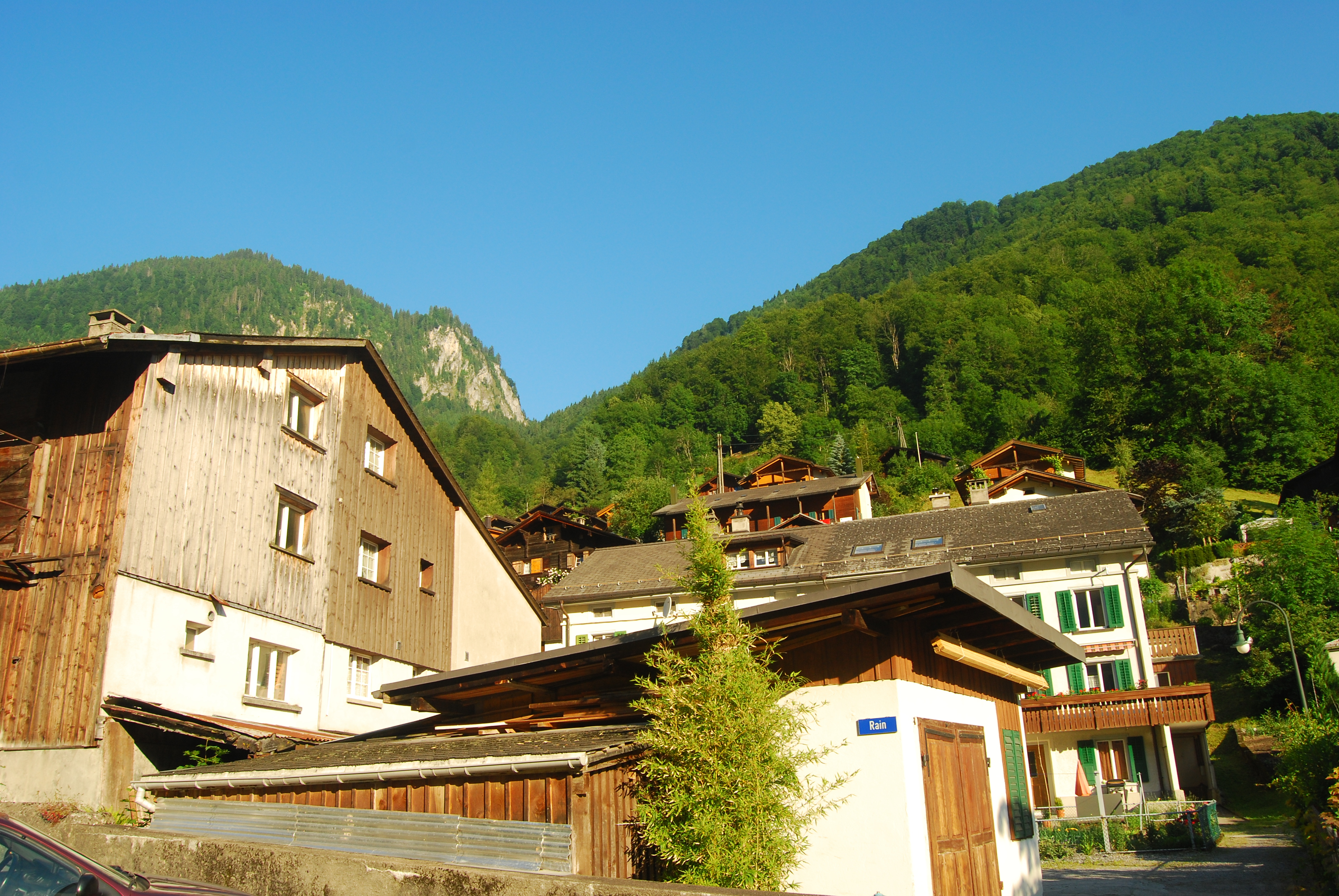
Housing in Luchsingen

Luchsingen has a population, as of 31 December 2020 and as defined by the former municipal area, of 1,119. As of 2007, 16.7% of the population was made up of foreign nationals. Over the last 10 years the population has decreased at a rate of -9.5%. Most of the population (as of 2000) speaks German (84.5%), with Italian being second most common (4.4%) and Turkish being third (2.1%).

In the 2007 federal election the most popular party was the SPS which received 44.3% of the vote. Most of the rest of the votes went to the SVP with 40.8% of the vote.

The entire Swiss population is generally well educated. In Luchsingen about 67.5% of the population (between age 25-64) have completed either non-mandatory upper secondary education or additional higher education (either University or a Fachhochschule).

Luchsingen has an unemployment rate of 1.9%. As of 2005, there were 47 people employed in the primary economic sector and about 21 businesses involved in this sector. 23 people are employed in the secondary sector and there are 11 businesses in this sector. 135 people are employed in the tertiary sector, with 29 businesses in this sector.

The historical population is given in the following table:

year	population
1850	652
1900	789
1950	768
2000	592

== Notable people ==
The surname Luchsinger (sometimes Lucksinger) is assumed to stem from this location.

Other notable people with a connection to the village include:

- Jakob Klaesi (1883–1980) a psychiatrist best known for his contributions to sleep therapy
