= Nidfurn =

- Village (and former municipality)
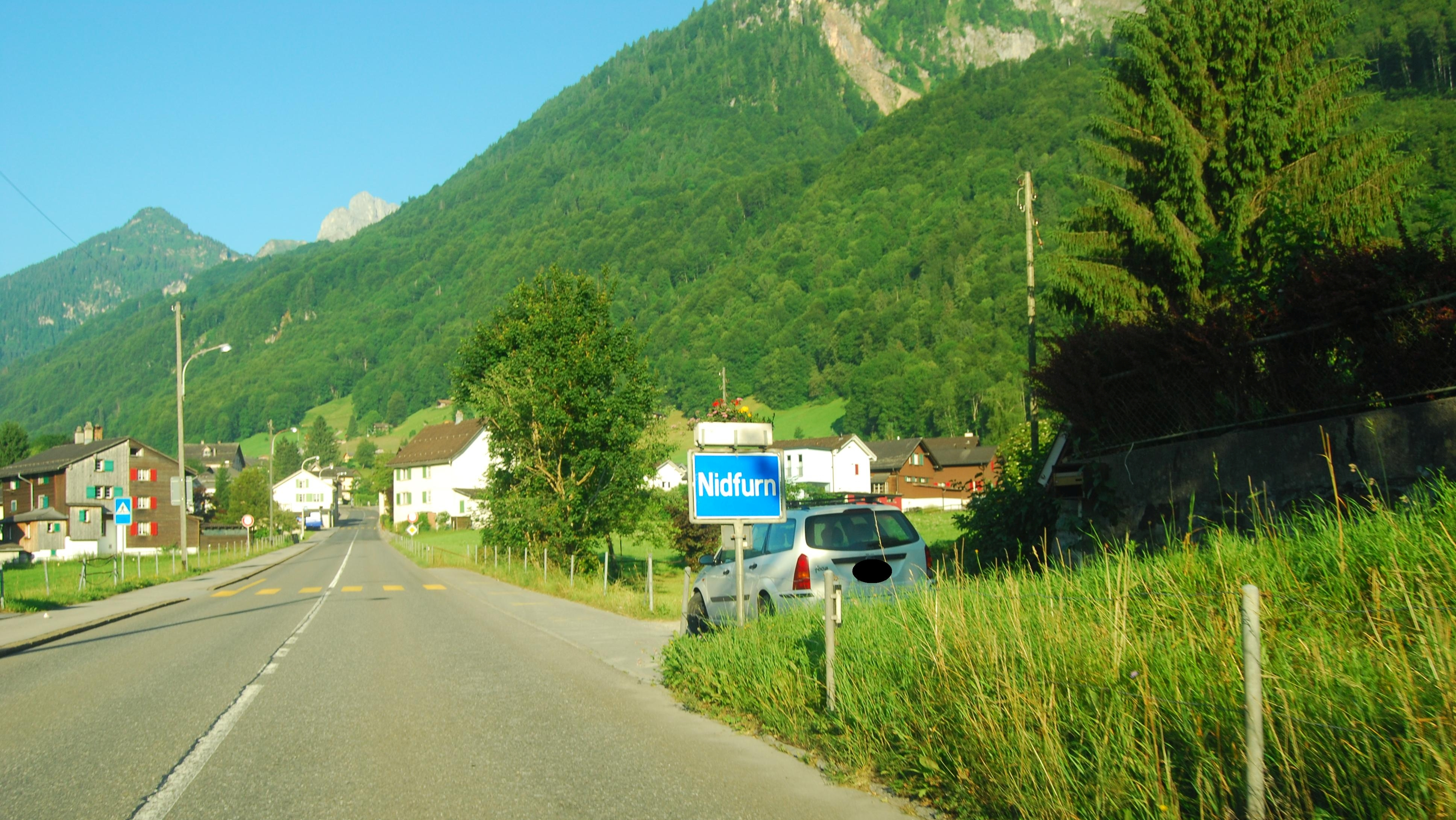

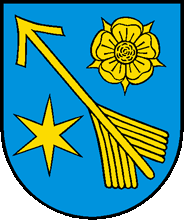
- Coat of arms

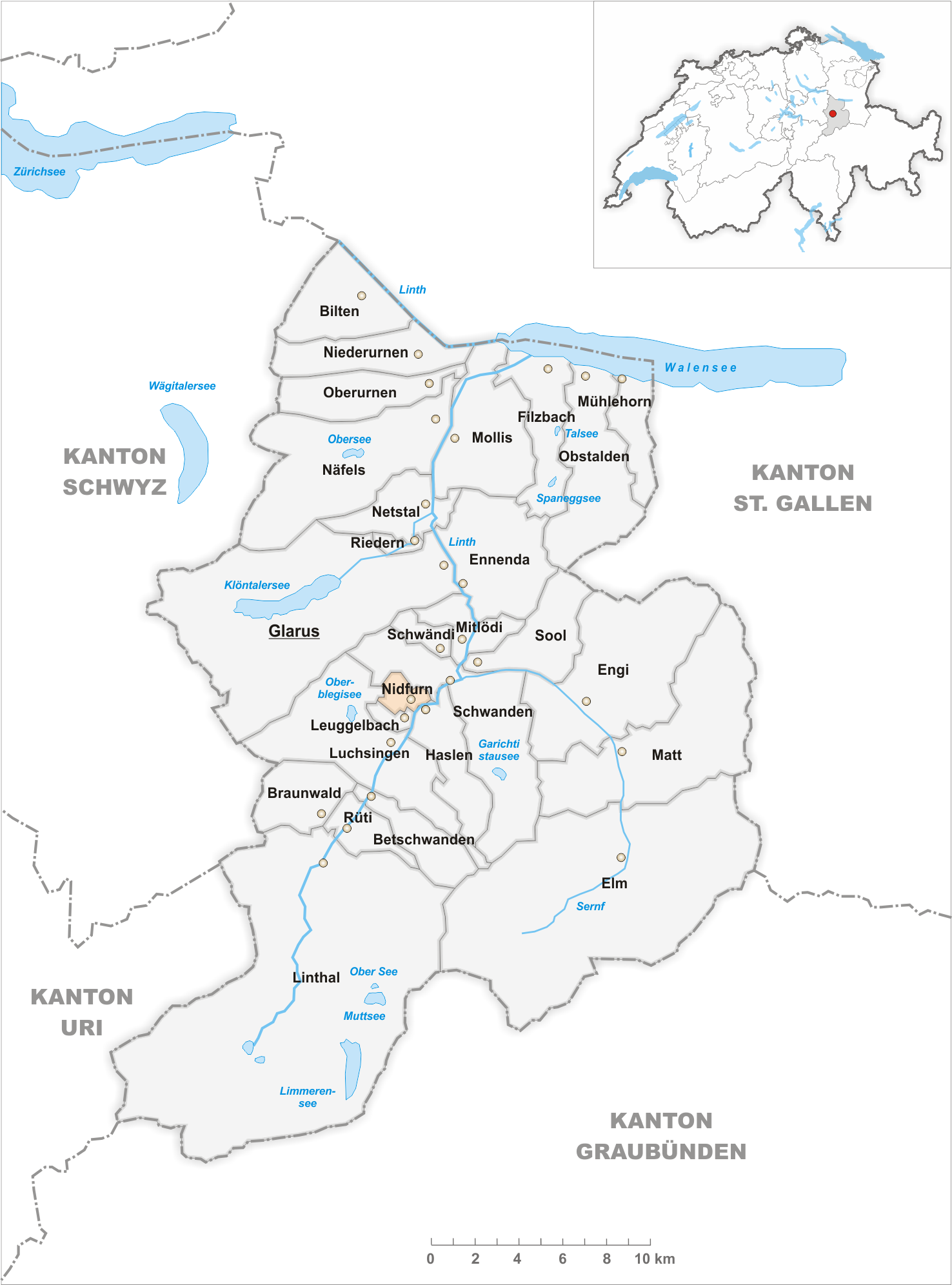
- The former municipal area (2005)
- Coordinates: 46°59′11″N 9°3′17″E
- Country: Switzerland
- Canton: Glarus
- Municipality: Glarus Süd
- Elevation: 560 m (1,840 ft)

Nidfurn is a village, and former municipality, in the municipality of Glarus Süd and canton of Glarus in Switzerland.

== History ==
Nidfurn is first mentioned in 1289 as Nitfúre.

Nidfurn belonged to Säckingen Abbey until 1395. During the Middle Ages, it was one of the richest parts of Glarus. Until the 20th century, the principal economic activity in the village was the raising of cattle, sheep and goats, with the dairy industry developing in the 18th century. Cotton spinning by hand was also common in the 18th century, but this never developed into factory-based industrial activity.

In 1879, Linthal was connected to the Swiss railway network by the opening of the Swiss Northeastern Railway line from Weesen to Linthal.

On 1 July 2006, the municipality of Nidfurn was merged into the municipality of Haslen. On 1 January 2011, the municipality of Haslen was itself merged into the new municipality of Glarus Süd.

== Geography ==
Nidfurn is located in the valley of the Linth river, with the village situated above the west bank of the river, at an elevation of approximately 560 m (1,840 ft). Leuggelbach lies to the south, Schwanden is to the north, and Haslen is across the river to the east.

== Transport ==
Nidfurn is located on the Hauptstrasse 17, which runs the length of the canton of Glarus before climbing the Klausen Pass into the canton of Uri, as well as on the Weesen to Linthal railway line that parallels the main road and the Linth river through Glarus. The high alpine Klausen Pass is normally only open to traffic between June and September, and for the rest of the year the road and railway up the valley form the only access to the village. The village is served by Nidfurn-Haslen railway station, which is served by the hourly Zürich S-Bahn service S25 between Linthal and Zurich.

== Demographics ==
The historical population of Nidfurn is given in the following table:

year	population
1701	135
1860	477
1900	348
1950	390
2000	258
