= Netstal railway station =

Railway station in Switzerland

Netstal
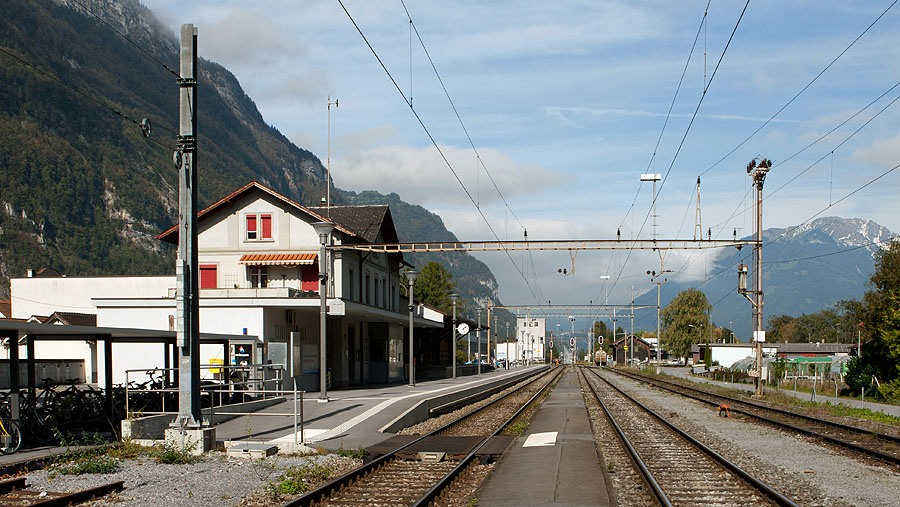
- The station building in 2012

General information
- Location: Bahnhofstrasse; Glarus, Canton of Glarus; Switzerland
- Coordinates: 47°03′52″N 9°03′34″E
- Elevation: 457 m (1,499 ft)
- Owner: Swiss Federal Railways
- Line: Ziegelbrücke–Linthal line
- Distance: 65.6 km (40.8 mi) from Zürich
- Train operators: Südostbahn; Swiss Federal Railways
- Connections: PostAuto Schweiz buses

Other information
- Fare zone: 902 (Tarifverbund Ostwind)

Passengers
- 2018: 960 per weekday

Services
| Preceding station | Zurich S-Bahn | Following station |
|---|---|---|
| Näfels-Mollis towards Zürich HB | S25 | Glarus towards Linthal |
| Preceding station | St. Gallen S-Bahn | Following station |
| Näfels-Mollis towards Rapperswil | S6 | Glarus towards Schwanden or Linthal |
Location

Netstal railway station (German: Bahnhof Netstal) is a railway station in the municipality of Glarus in the Swiss canton of Glarus. It is an intermediate stop on the Weesen to Linthal railway line, and serves the village of Netstal.

The station is served by Zürich S-Bahn service S25 between Zurich and Linthal, and by St. Gallen S-Bahn service S6 between Rapperswil and Schwanden. Both services operate once per hour, combining to provide two trains per hour between Ziegelbrücke and Schwanden.

== Services ==
As of the December 2020 timetable change, the following services stop at Netstal:

- St. Gallen S-Bahn S6: hourly service between Rapperswil and Schwanden.
- Zürich S-Bahn S25: hourly service between Zürich Hauptbahnhof and Linthal.
