= Nidfurn-Haslen railway station =

Railway station in Switzerland

Nidfurn-Haslen
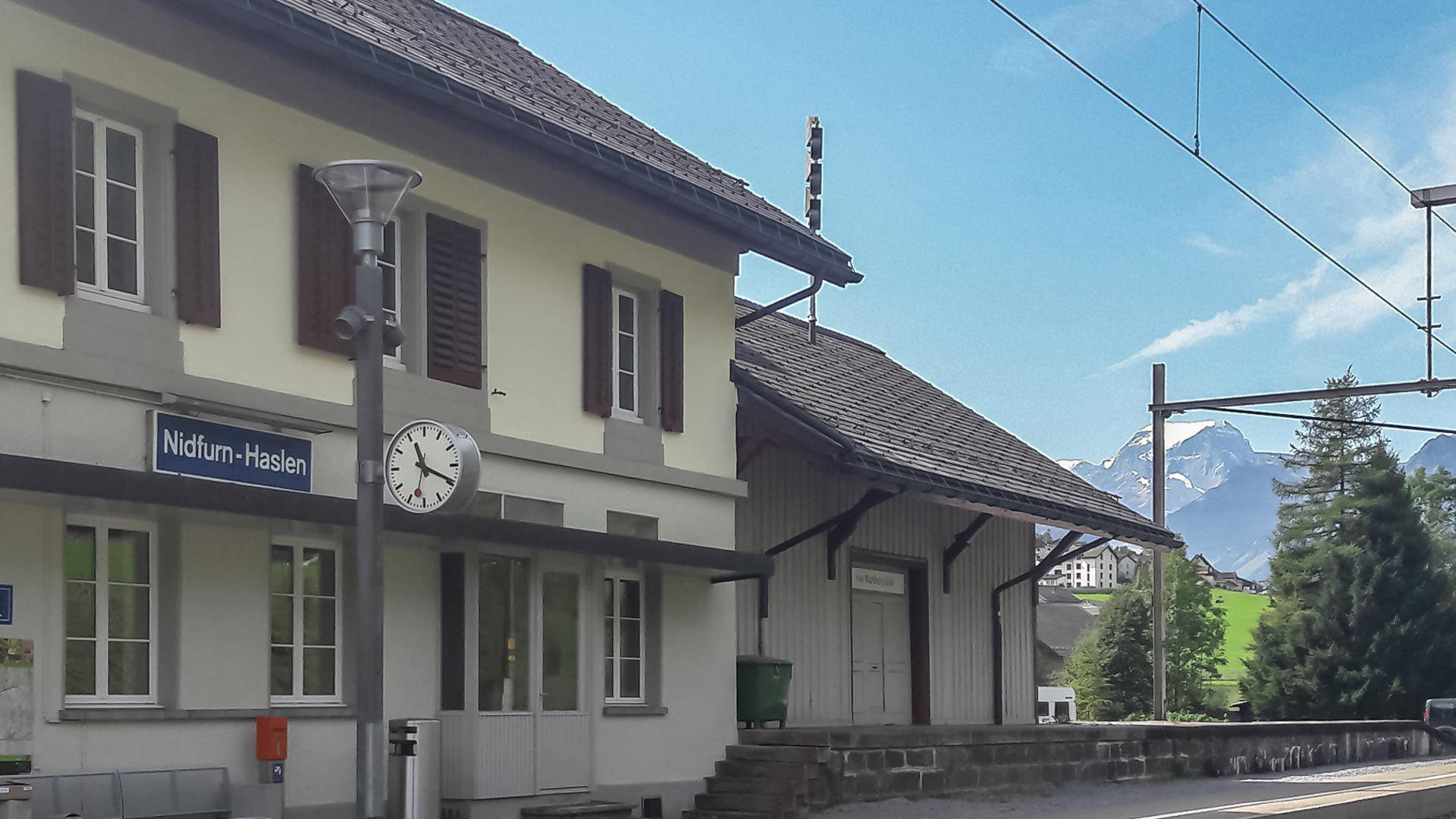
- Nidfurn-Haslen railway station

General information
- Location: Bahnhofstrasse; Nidfurn; Glarus Süd, Glarus; Switzerland
- Coordinates: 46.985991°N 9.059654°E
- Elevation: 540 m (1,770 ft)
- Owner: Swiss Federal Railways
- Operator: Swiss Federal Railways
- Line: Weesen-Linthal

Services
Preceding station	Zurich S-Bahn	Following station
Schwanden towards Zürich HB	S25	Leuggelbach towards Linthal
Location
- Location within Switzerland

Nidfurn-Haslen railway station is a railway station in the municipality of Glarus Süd in the Swiss canton of Glarus. It takes its name from the nearby villages of Nidfurn and Haslen. The station is situated on the Weesen to Linthal railway line, and served by the hourly Zürich S-Bahn service S25 between Zurich and Linthal.

== Services ==
As of the December 2023 timetable change, the following services call at Nidfurn-Haslen:

- St. Gallen S-Bahn:
  - S6: hourly service between Linthal and Rapperswil via Ziegelbrücke (only during off-peak hours).
- Zürich S-Bahn:
  - S25: hourly service between Linthal and Zürich HB via Ziegelbrücke.
