= Haslen =

Haslen may refer to

- Haslen, Appenzell Innerrhoden, a village in the Swiss canton of Appenzell Innerrhoden
- Haslen, Glarus, a village in the Swiss canton of Glarus
