= Lüchinger =

Lüchinger is a Swiss-German surname. Notable people with the surname include:

- Arnulf Lüchinger (born 1941), Swiss-Dutch architect, author and editor
- Gabriel Lüchinger (born 1992), Swiss footballer
- Nicolas Lüchinger (born 1994), Swiss former footballer
- Simon Lüchinger (born 2002), Liechtenstein footballer
- Walter Lüchinger (1926–2021), Swiss rower

== See also ==
- Luchsinger, people with this surname
