= Haslen, Glarus =

Haslen
- Village (and former municipality)
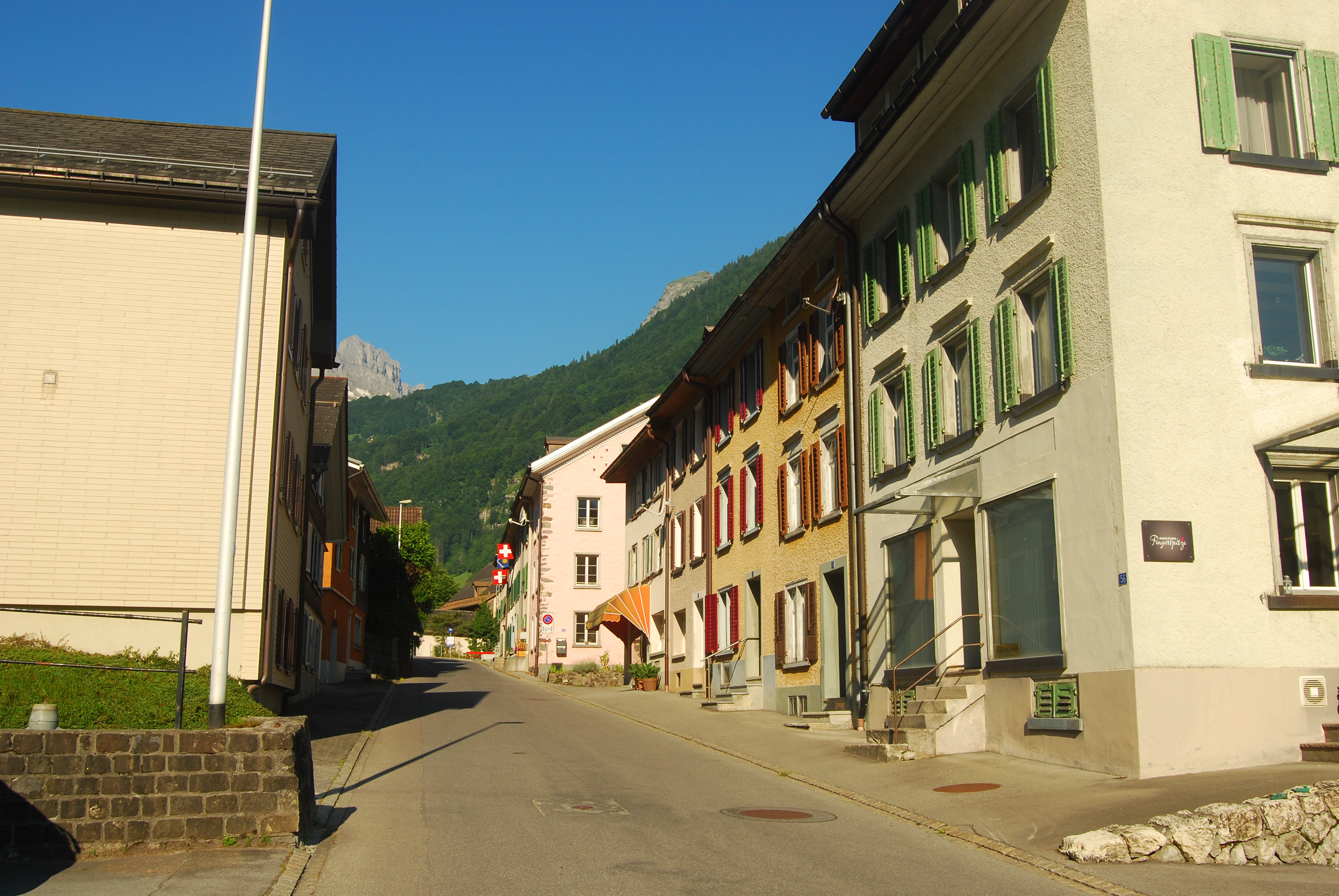

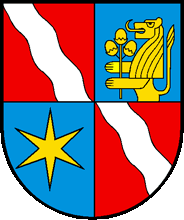
- Coat of arms

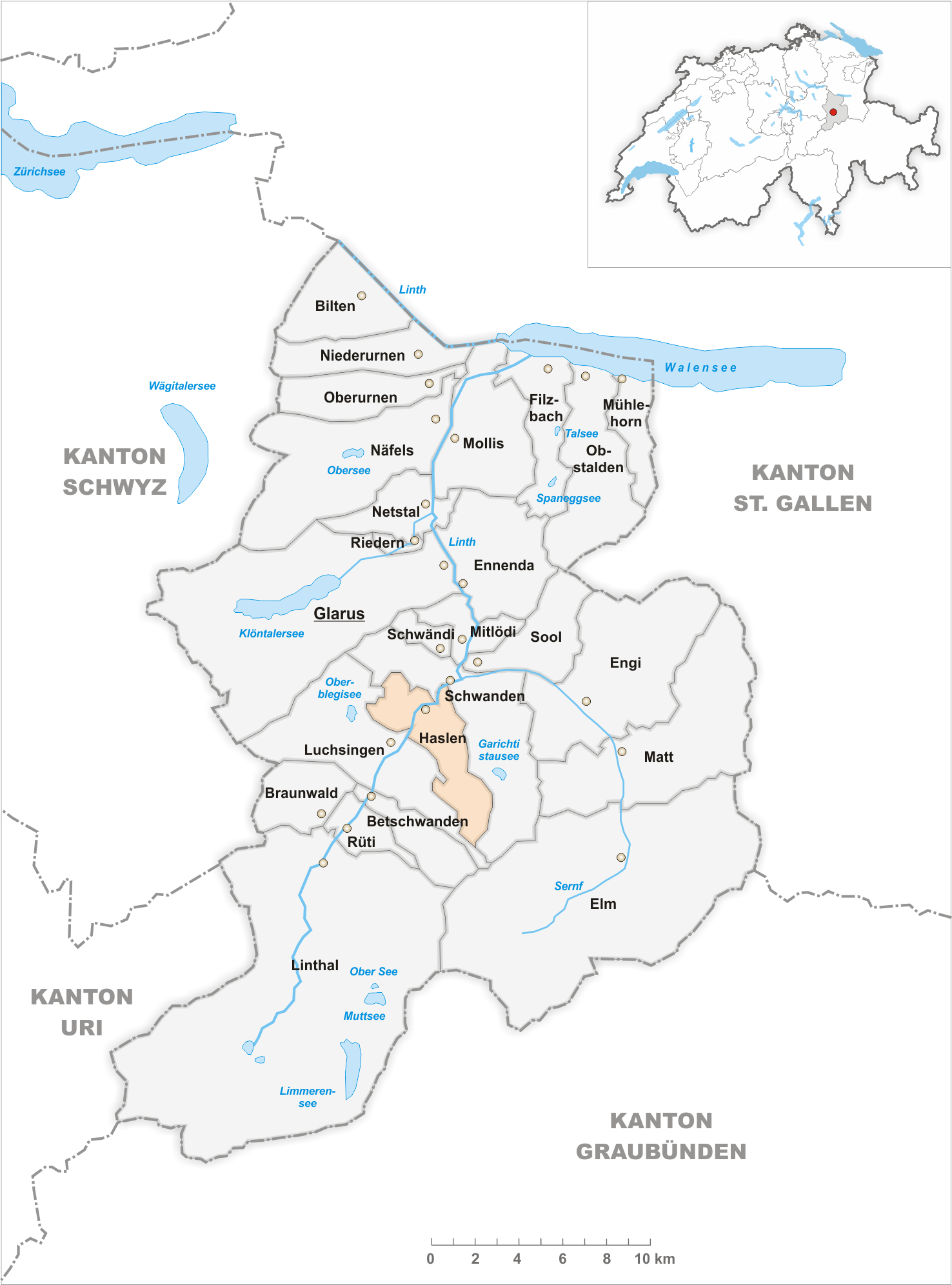
- The former municipal area (2007)
- Coordinates: 46°58′54″N 9°3′27″E
- Country: Switzerland
- Canton: Glarus
- Municipality: Glarus Süd

Area
  - Total: 15.8 km^{2} (6.1 sq mi)
- Elevation: 586 m (1,923 ft)

Population (December 2020)
  - Total: 999
  - Density: 63.2/km^{2} (164/sq mi)

Haslen is a village, and former municipality, in the municipality of Glarus Süd and canton of Glarus in Switzerland.

== History ==
Haslen is first mentioned in 1289 as Burchard von Hasle.

On 1 July 2006, the municipality of Haslen incorporated the neighbouring municipalities of Leuggelbach and Nidfurn. On 1 January 2011, Haslen was itself merged into the new municipality of Glarus Süd.

== Geography ==
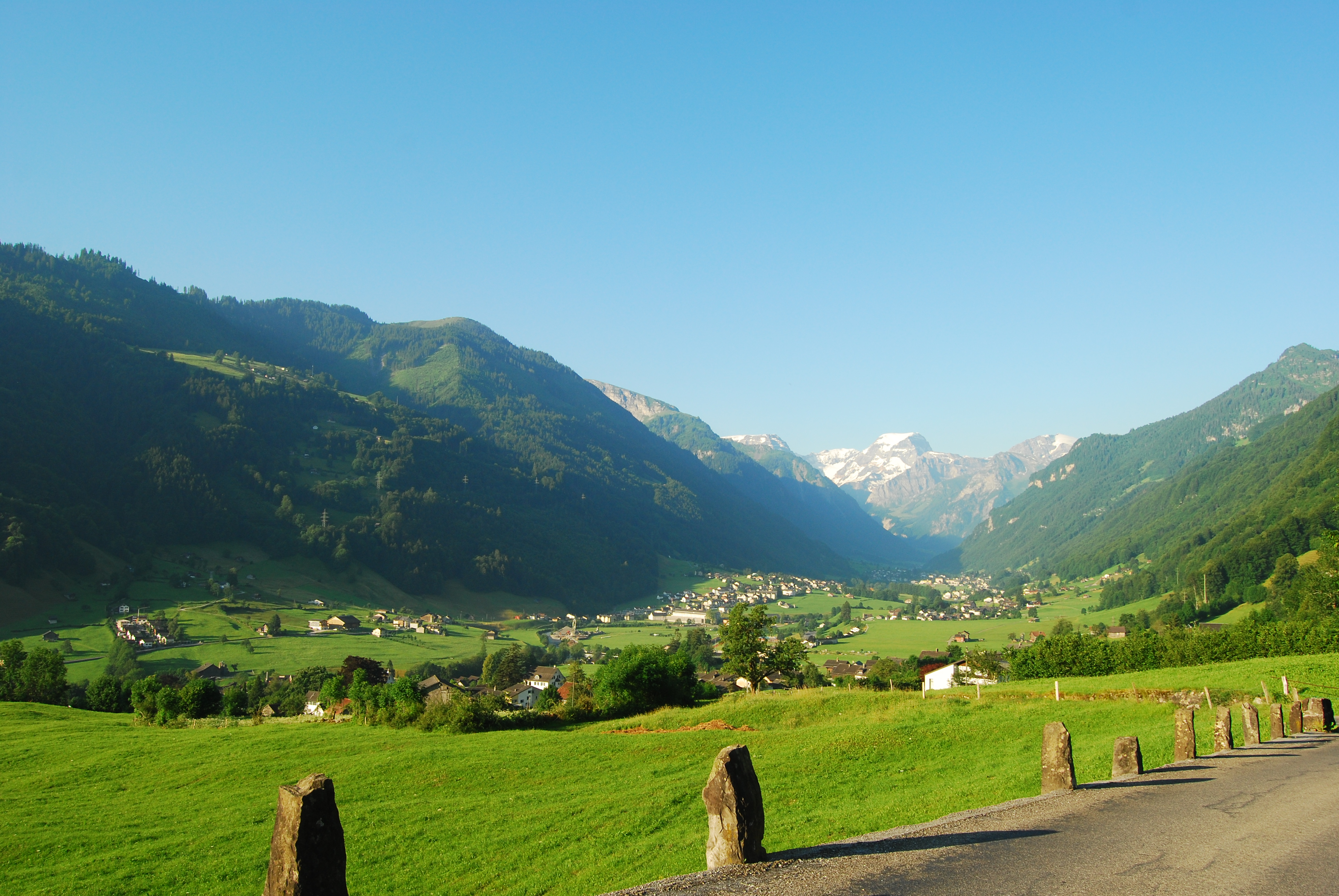
The village and valley seen from Schwandi

Haslen is in the valley of the Linth river, and the village is on the east bank of the river at an elevation of approximately 586 m (1,923 ft). The villages of Leuggelbach and Diesbach lie across the river to the west, whilst Hätzingen is to the south and Schwanden is to the north.

Haslen consists of the linear village of Haslen itself, the hamlets of Leu (formerly Nesslau), Oberhaslen, Büel, Zussigen and Mülibächli.

Haslen has an area, as defined by the former municipal boundaries in 2006, of 15.8 km^{2} (6.1 sq mi). Of this area, 42.9% is used for agricultural purposes, while 45.2% is forested. Of the rest of the land, 3.3% is settled (buildings or roads) and the remainder (8.6%) is non-productive (rivers, glaciers or mountains).

== Transport ==
Haslen is located just off the Hauptstrasse 17, which at this point runs on the west bank of the Linth river. Hauptstrasse 17 runs the length of the canton of Glarus before climbing the Klausen Pass into the canton of Uri, as well as on the Weesen to Linthal railway line that parallels the main road and the Linth river through Glarus. The high alpine Klausen Pass is normally only open to traffic between June and September, and for the rest of the year the road and railway up the valley form the only access to the village. The village is served by Nidfurn-Haslen railway station which is served by the hourly Zürich S-Bahn service S25 between Linthal and Zürich.

== Demographics ==
Haslen has a population, as of 31 December 2020 and as defined by the former municipal area, of 999. As of 2007, 9.7% of the population was made up of foreign nationals. Over the last 10 years the population has decreased at a rate of -8.7%. Most of the population (as of 2000) speaks German (90.6%), with Turkish being second most common (3.1%) and Italian being third (2.7%).

In the 2007 federal election the most popular party was the SPS which received 46.6% of the vote. Most of the rest of the votes went to the SVP with 41.8% of the vote.

The entire Swiss population is generally well educated. In Haslen about 66.6% of the population (between ages 25–64) have completed either non-mandatory upper secondary education or additional higher education (either University or a Fachhochschule).

Haslen has an unemployment rate of 0.93%. As of 2005, there were 21 people employed in the primary economic sector and about 11 businesses involved in this sector. 96 people were employed in the secondary sector and there were 13 businesses in this sector. 74 people were employed in the tertiary sector, with 24 businesses in this sector.

The historical population is given in the following table:

year	population
1777	137
1850	787
1900	766
1950	769
1980	489
2000	649
