= S6 (St. Gallen S-Bahn) =

Railway service in Switzerland

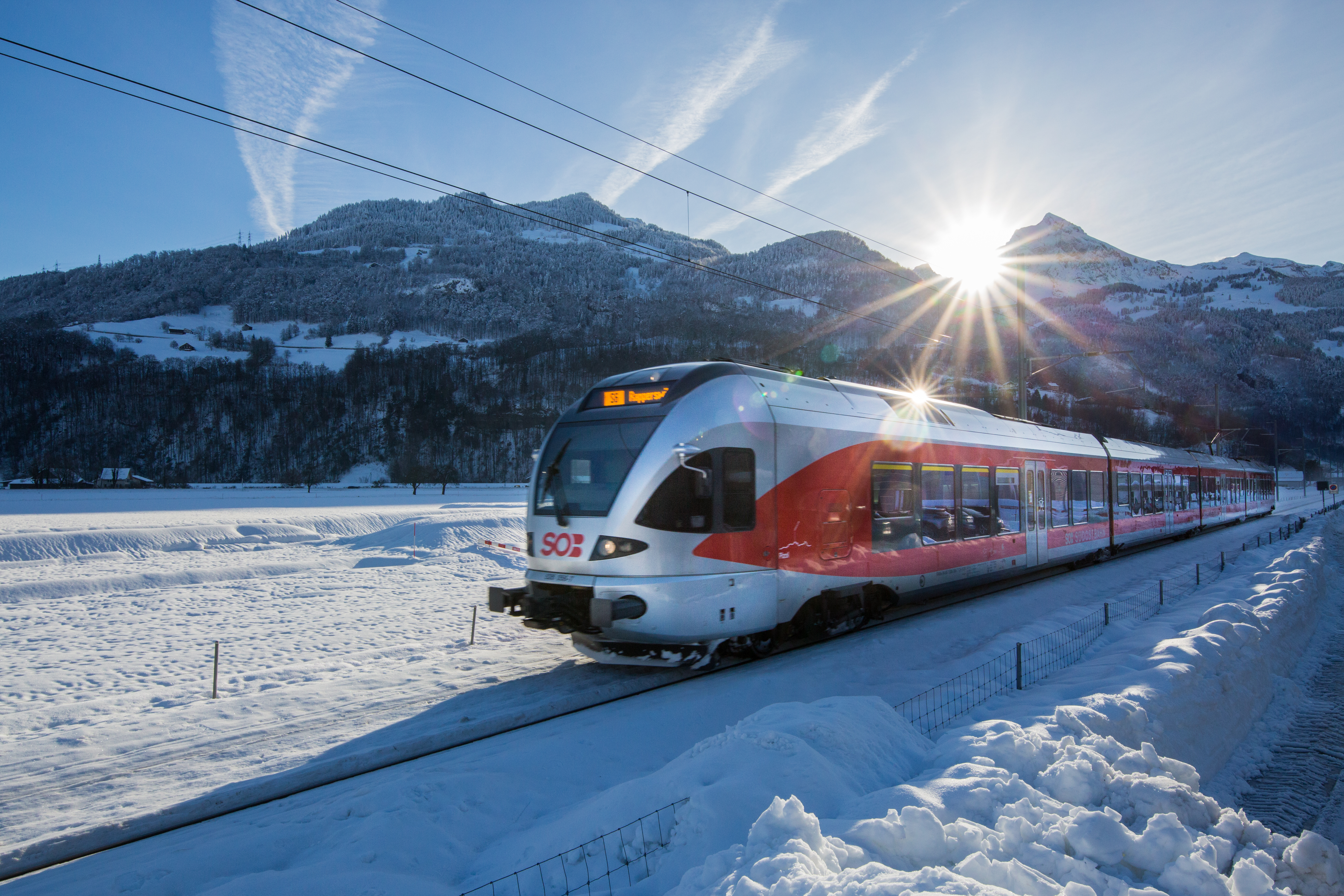
- An S6 near Näfels in 2021

Overview
- First service: 15 December 2013
- Current operator(s): Südostbahn
- Former operator(s): Swiss Federal Railways

Route
- Termini: Rapperswil; Schwanden or Linthal
- Stops: 14/21
- Distance travelled: 53.1 kilometres (33.0 mi)
- Average journey time: 51 minutes (Rapperswil–Schwanden); 1 hour 8 minutes (Rapperswil–Linthal)
- Service frequency: Hourly
- Line(s) used: Rapperswil–Ziegelbrücke line; Ziegelbrücke–Linthal line

The S6 is a railway service of the St. Gallen S-Bahn that provides hourly service between Rapperswil and Schwanden, in the cantons of St. Gallen and Glarus. A limited number of trains continue from Schwanden to Linthal. Südostbahn, a private company primarily owned by the federal government and the canton of St. Gallen, operates the service.

== Operations ==
The S6 operates hourly between Rapperswil and Schwanden, using the Rapperswil–Ziegelbrücke and Ziegelbrücke–Linthal lines. Between Rapperswil and Ziegelbrücke the S6 combines with the S17 for half-hourly service with calls at all stations. Between Uznach and Rapperswil, the Voralpen-Express and S4 provide additional combined half-hourly service, but without intermediate stops. Between Ziegelbrücke and Schwanden, the S6 and the S25 of the Zürich S-Bahn combine for half-hourly service. Most S6 trains terminate in Schwanden, but the service continues to Linthal during off-peak hours (this leg is otherwise serviced by the S25).

== Route ==
S6 Rapperswil – Uznach – Ziegelbrücke – Glarus – Schwanden ( – Linthal, only during off-peak hours)

- Rapperswil
- Blumenau
- Schmerikon
- Uznach
- Benken
- Schänis
- Ziegelbrücke
- Nieder- und Oberurnen
- Näfels-Mollis
- Netstal
- Glarus
- Ennenda
- Mitlödi
- Schwanden
- Nidfurn-Haslen
- Leuggelbach
- Luchsingen-Hätzingen
- Diesbach-Betschwanden
- Rüti GL
- Linthal Braunwaldbahn
- Linthal

== History ==
The December 2013 timetable change applied the S6 designation to an existing hourly service between Rapperswil and Linthal. That service, and the new service, were operated by Swiss Federal Railways (SBB). Supplementing the S6 was the Glarner Sprinter, a long-distance train that originated at Zürich Hauptbahnhof and operated every two hours, terminating in Schwanden. The S6 designation had been used for a service between St. Gallen and St. Gallen Haggen, operated by THURBO.

In July 2014, the Glarner Sprinter was designated the S25 of the Zürich S-Bahn, made hourly, and extended to Linthal. The S6, in turn, was cut back to Schwanden. SBB transferred the operation of the S6 to Südostbahn with the December 2020 timetable change.
