= Jakob Klaesi =

Swiss psychiatrist (1883–1980)

- Born: 29 May 1883; Luchsingen, Switzerland
- Died: 17 August 1980 (aged 97); Knonau, Switzerland
- Citizenship: Switzerland
- Education: Kiel University, University of Zurich
- Known for: Psychiatric sleep cure Somnifen; Phenomenological analysis of expression
- Awards: Honorary degree of Kiel University
- Scientific career
- Fields: Psychiatry; Psychotherapy; Psychodynamics
- Workplaces: Burghölzli clinic Psychiatric Outpatient Department Basel; Schloss Knonau private clinic Psychiatric University Hospital Bern; University of Bern
- Doctoral advisor: C. G. Jung

Jakob Klaesi (29 May 1883 – 17 August 1980) was a Swiss psychiatrist most notable for his contributions to the sleep therapy and his phenomenological analysis of expression.

== Life ==
From 1903 to 1909, Klaesi studied medicine at the University of Zurich, Kiel University, and the Ludwig-Maximilians-Universität München; in 1912 he received his doctorate in Zurich and was then trained as a psychiatrist. From 1923 to 1926 he was chief physician at the Psychiatric University Clinic in Basel, and later head of the private clinic Knonau. From 1933, he was an extraordinary Professor, from 1936 to 1953 full professor of psychiatry at the University of Bern (rector from 1950 to 1951) and director of the Psychiatric Clinic Waldau beginning 1 April 1933.

Klaesi was known for the introduction of the Sleep Treatment (1921). He set up colonies for the sick, and in 1934, he founded the psychiatric clinic of Berne. As a teacher he influenced the training of physicians significantly. Klaesi wrote also poems and plays.

== Published works ==
- Klaesi, Jakob (1917), "Ueber psychiatrischpoliklinische Behandlungsmethoden", Z. Ges. Neurol. Psychiat., 36:431–450
- Klaesi, Jakob (1917), "Die psychogenen Ursachen der essentiellen Enuresis nocturna infantum", Schweiz. Arch. Neurol. Psychiat. 35:371
- Klaesi, Jakob (1921), "Ueber Somnifen, eine medikamentöse Therapie schizophrener Aufregungszustände", Schweiz. Arch. Neurol. Psychiat. 8:131
- Klaesi, Jakob (1922), "Ueber die therapeutische Anwendung der ‘Dauernarkose’ mittels Somnifen bei Schizophrenen",Z. Ges. Neurol. Psychiat., 74:557
- Klaesi, Jakob (1937), "Die Irrenanstalt als Weg zur Rückkehr ins Leben", In: Vom seelischen Kranksein, Vorbeugen und Heilen. Paul Haupt, Bern/Leipzig
- Klaesi, Jakob (1938), "Ohne Insulin", Schweiz. Med. Wochenschr. 68:1164
- Klaesi, Jakob (1950), "Der unheilbare Kranke und seine Behandlung", Rektoratsrede University of Bern, 18. 11. 1950, Paul Haupt, Bern
- Klaesi, Jakob (1952) "Psychotherapie in der Klinik", Montasschr. Psychiat. Neurol. 124: 334–353
- Klaesi, Jakob (1953) "Ueber Neurosenlehre und Psychotherapie", In: von Bergmann, G. (Editor), Handbuch der Inneren Medizin, Springer, Berlin/Göttingen/Heidelberg
- Klaesi, Jakob (1969), Gott und sein Zweifler, Werner Classen, Zürich
- Klaesi, Jakob (1977), "Psychiatrie in Selbstdarstellungen", In: Pongratz L. J. (Editor). ... Hans Huber, Bern
