= Näfels-Mollis railway station =

Railway station in Switzerland

Näfels-Mollis
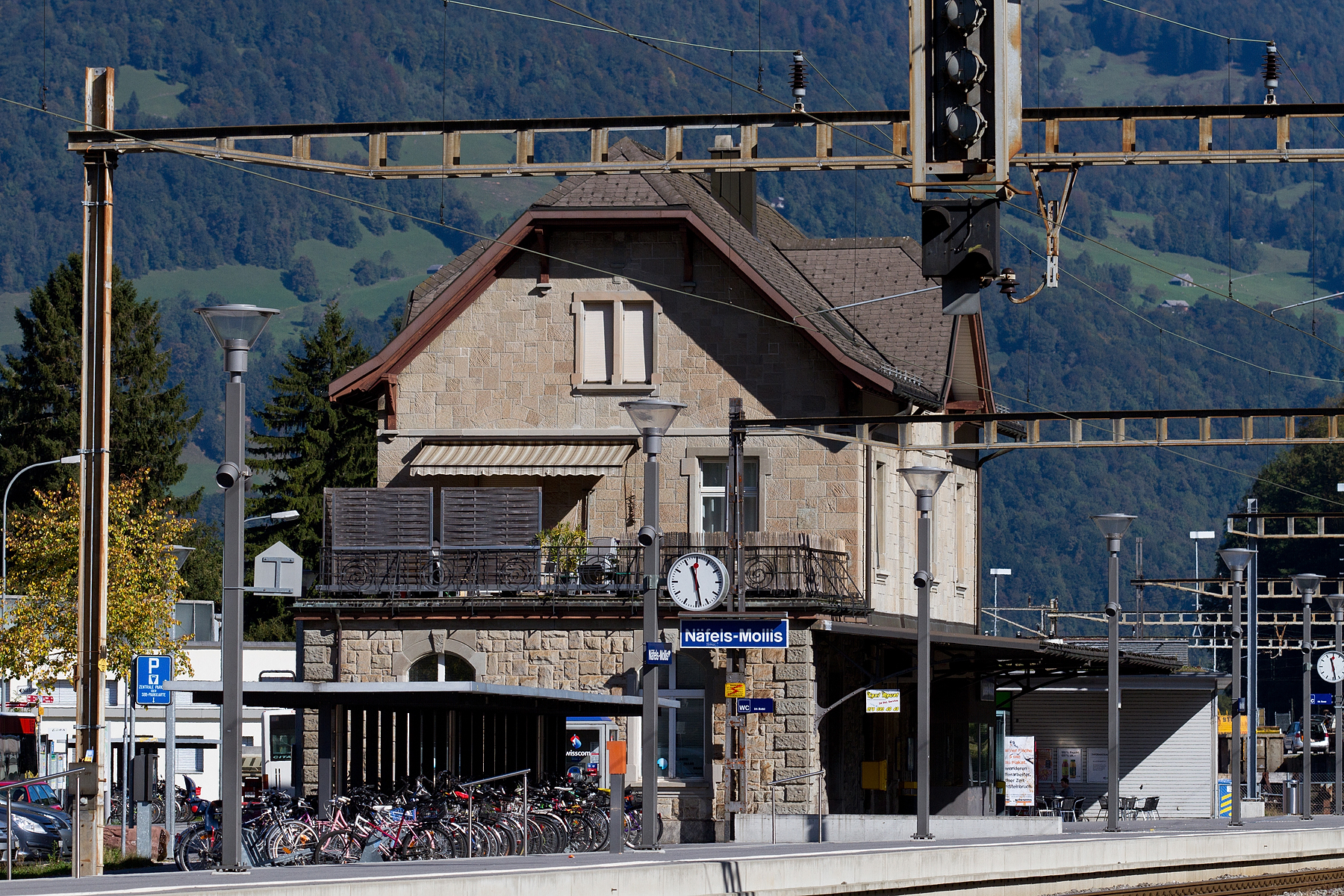
- The station building in 2012

General information
- Location: Bahnhofstrasse; Glarus Nord, Glarus; Switzerland
- Coordinates: 47°05′55″N 9°04′12″E
- Elevation: 437 m (1,434 ft)
- Owner: Swiss Federal Railways
- Line: Ziegelbrücke–Linthal line
- Distance: 61.7 km (38.3 mi) from Zürich
- Train operators: Südostbahn; Swiss Federal Railways
- Connections: PostAuto Schweiz buses

Other information
- Fare zone: 901 and 902 (Tarifverbund Ostwind)

Passengers
- 2018: 1,600 per weekday

Services
Preceding station	Zurich S-Bahn	Following station
Ziegelbrücke towards Zürich HB	S25	Netstal towards Linthal
Preceding station	St. Gallen S-Bahn	Following station
Nieder- and Oberurnen towards Rapperswil	S6	Netstal towards Schwanden or Linthal
Location

Näfels-Mollis railway station (German: Bahnhof Näfels-Mollis) is a railway station in the municipality of Glarus Nord in the Swiss canton of Glarus. It is an intermediate stop on the Weesen to Linthal railway line, and serves the twin villages of Näfels and Mollis.

The station is served by Zürich S-Bahn service S25 between Zurich and Linthal, and by St. Gallen S-Bahn service S6 between Rapperswil and Schwanden. Both services operate once per hour, combining to provide two trains per hour between Ziegelbrücke and Schwanden.

== Services ==
As of the December 2020 timetable change, the following services stop at Näfels-Mollis:

- St. Gallen S-Bahn S6: hourly service between Rapperswil and Schwanden.
- Zürich S-Bahn S25: hourly service between Zürich Hauptbahnhof and Linthal.
