= Ennenda railway station =

Railway station in Ennenda, Switzerland

Ennenda
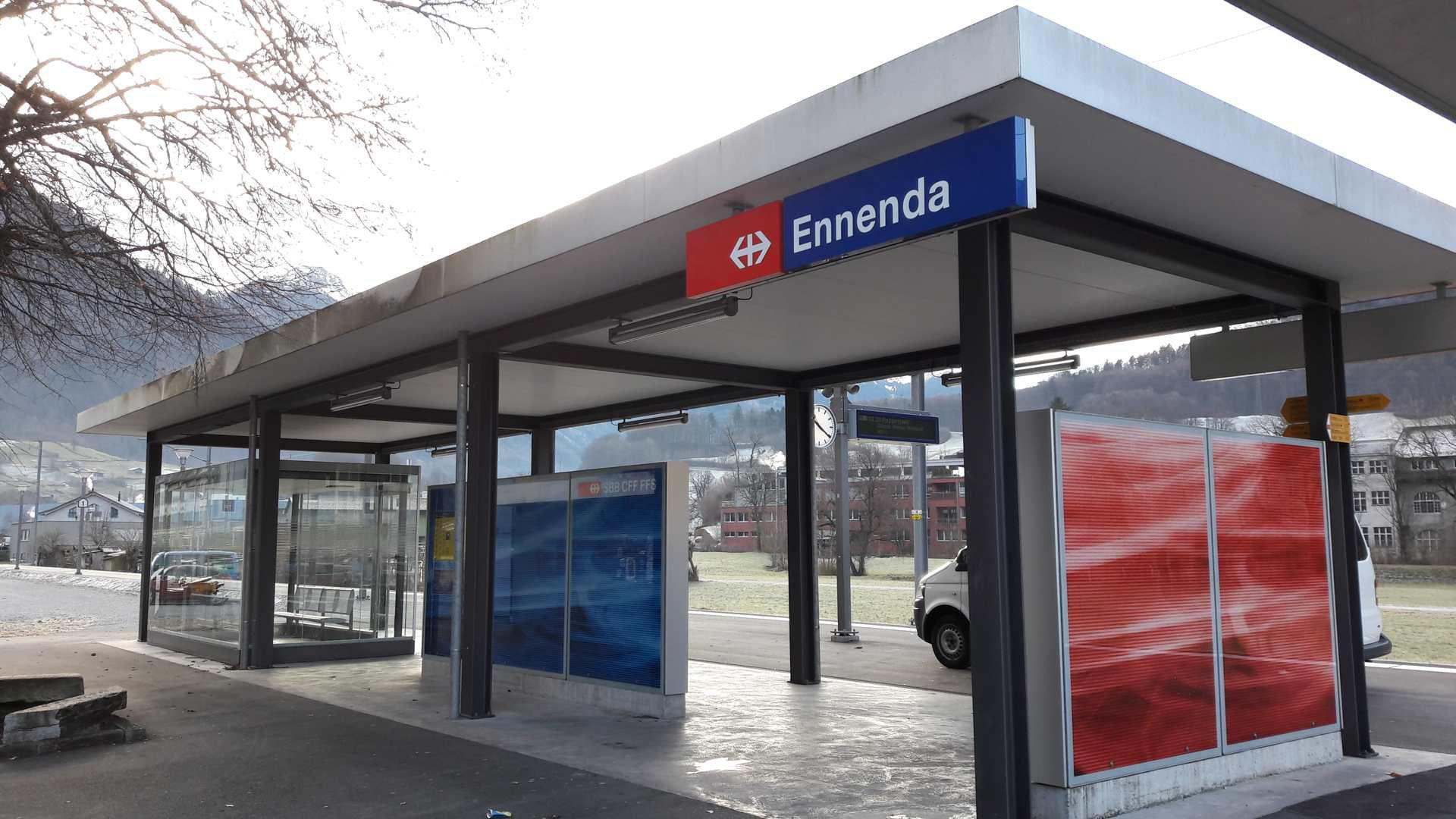
- The station waiting area in 2016

General information
- Location: Bahnhofstrasse; Ennenda, Canton of Glarus; Switzerland
- Coordinates: 47°01′59″N 9°04′38″E
- Elevation: 477 m (1,565 ft)
- Owner: Swiss Federal Railways
- Line: Ziegelbrücke–Linthal line
- Distance: 69.5 km (43.2 mi) from Zürich
- Train operators: Südostbahn; Swiss Federal Railways
- Connections: PostAuto Schweiz buses

Other information
- Fare zone: 902 and 903 (Tarifverbund Ostwind)

Passengers
- 2018: 630 per weekday

Services
| Preceding station | Zurich S-Bahn | Following station |
|---|---|---|
| Glarus towards Zürich HB | S25 | Mitlödi towards Linthal |
| Preceding station | St. Gallen S-Bahn | Following station |
| Glarus towards Rapperswil | S6 | Mitlödi towards Schwanden or Linthal |
Location

Ennenda railway station (German: Bahnhof Ennenda) is a railway station in the municipality of Glarus in the Swiss canton of Glarus. It is an intermediate stop on the Weesen to Linthal railway line, and serves the village of Ennenda.

The station is served by Zürich S-Bahn service S25 between Zurich and Linthal, and by St. Gallen S-Bahn service S6 between Rapperswil and Schwanden. Both services operate once per hour, combining to provide two trains per hour between Ziegelbrücke and Schwanden.

== Services ==
As of the December 2020 timetable change, the following services stop at Ennenda:

- St. Gallen S-Bahn S6: hourly service between Rapperswil and Schwanden.
- Zürich S-Bahn S25: hourly service between Zürich Hauptbahnhof and Linthal.
