= Rüchigrat =

Mountain in Switzerland

- Location within Switzerland Location within Canton of Glarus

Highest point
- Peak: Bösbächistock
- Elevation: 2,657 m (8,717 ft)
- Prominence: 222 m (728 ft)
- Parent peak: Glärnisch (Bächistock)
- Coordinates: 46°58′45″N 8°58′38″E

Geography
- Country: Switzerland
- Canton: Glarus
- Parent range: Schwyzer Alps

The Rüchigrat (2,657 m [8,717 ft]) is a mountain of the Schwyzer Alps, located west of Luchsingen in the canton of Glarus, Switzerland. It lies south of the Glärnisch, on the range between the valley of the Klöntalersee and the main Linth valley.

The Rüchigrat consists of a 2 kilometres (1.2 mi) long ridge, which culminates at the summit named Bösbächistock.

== See also ==
- List of mountains of the canton of Glarus
