= Glarus railway station =

Railway station in Glarus, Switzerland

Glarus
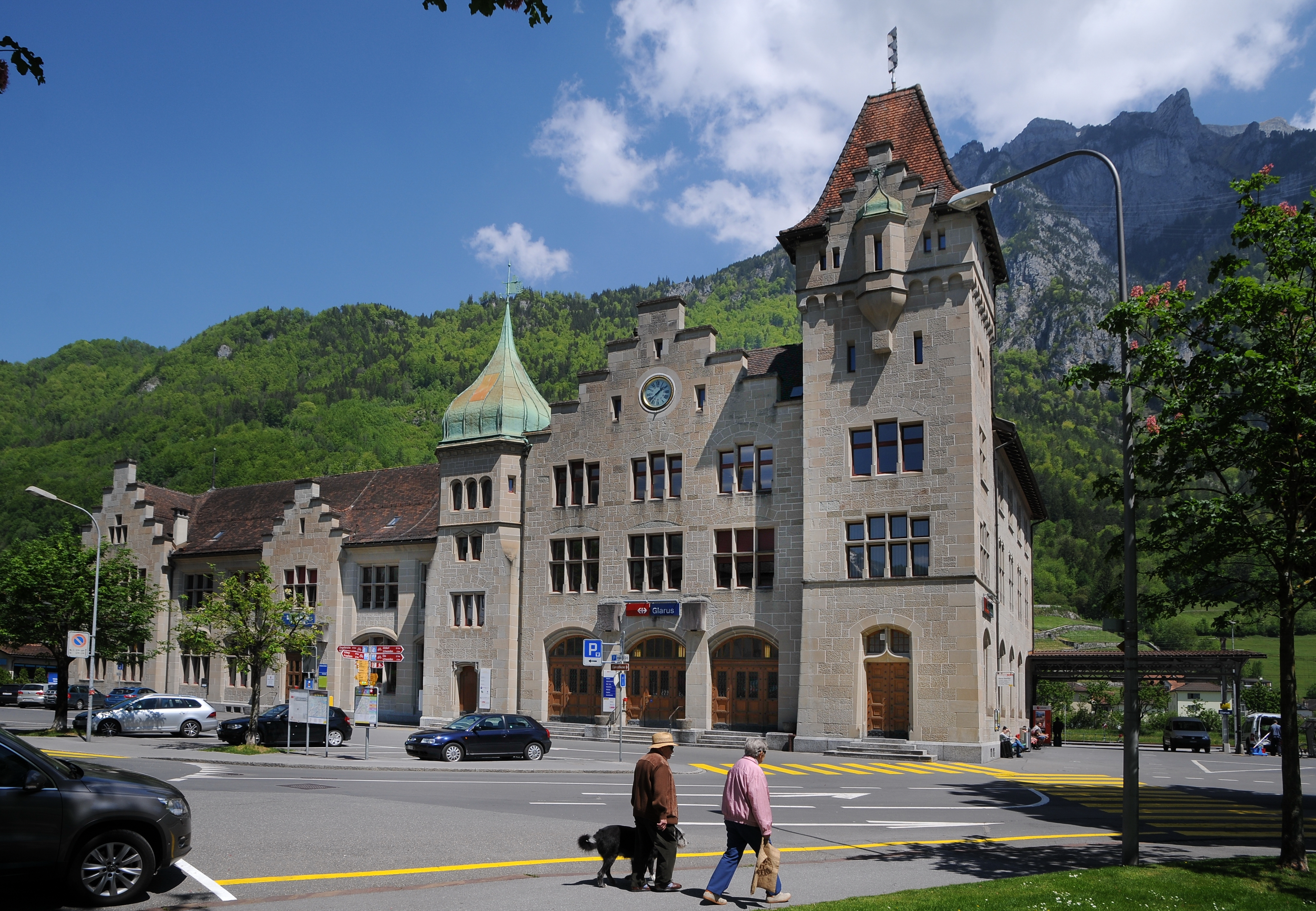
- The station building in 2012

General information
- Location: Bahnhofstrasse; Glarus, Canton of Glarus; Switzerland
- Coordinates: 47°02′24″N 9°04′18″E
- Elevation: 471 m (1,545 ft)
- Owner: Swiss Federal Railways
- Line: Ziegelbrücke–Linthal line
- Distance: 68.6 km (42.6 mi) from Zürich
- Train operators: Südostbahn; Swiss Federal Railways
- Connections: PostAuto Schweiz buses

Other information
- Fare zone: 902 and 903 (Tarifverbund Ostwind)

Passengers
- 2018: 2,900 per weekday

Services
Preceding station	Zurich S-Bahn	Following station
Netstal towards Zürich HB	S25	Ennenda towards Linthal
Preceding station	St. Gallen S-Bahn	Following station
Netstal towards Rapperswil	S6	Ennenda towards Schwanden or Linthal
Location

Glarus railway station (German: Bahnhof Glarus) is a railway station in the municipality of Glarus in the Swiss canton of Glarus. It is an intermediate stop on the Ziegelbrücke–Linthal line.

The station is served by Zürich S-Bahn service S25 between Zurich and Linthal, and by St. Gallen S-Bahn service S6 between Rapperswil and Schwanden. Both services operate once per hour, combining to provide two trains per hour between Ziegelbrücke and Schwanden.

The station was opened in 1859, with the completion of the railway from Weesen. However the distinctive station building, designed by Karl August Hiller, was built between 1902 and 1903 as a replacement for an earlier structure. The station building, along with a goods shed dating from 1894, and a locomotive shed and turntable, is inscribed on the Swiss Inventory of Cultural Property of National Significance.

== Services ==
As of the December 2020 timetable change, the following services stop at Glarus:

- St. Gallen S-Bahn S6: hourly service between Rapperswil and Schwanden.
- Zürich S-Bahn S25: hourly service between Zürich Hauptbahnhof and Linthal.
