= Oberblegisee =

Lake in Glarus, Switzerland

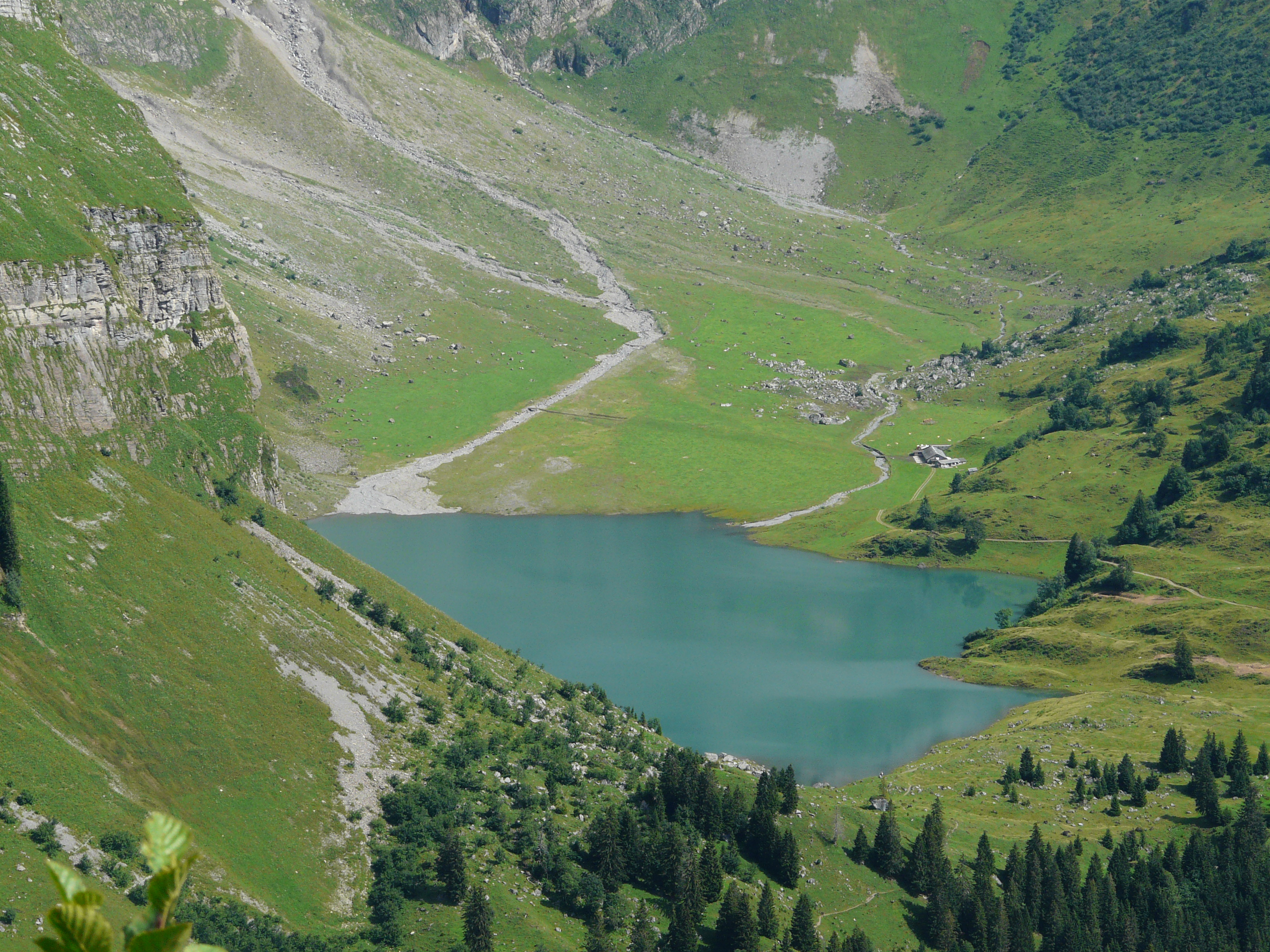
- Oberblegisee

- Location within Canton of Glarus Location within Switzerland Location within Alps
- Interactive map of Oberblegisee
- Location: Glarus
- Coordinates: 46°58′51″N 9°00′48″E
- Basin countries: Switzerland
- Surface area: 0.17 square kilometres (0.066 sq mi)
- Surface elevation: 1,422 metres (4,665 ft)

Oberblegisee is a lake in the Canton of Glarus, Switzerland. It is located at an elevation of 1,422 metres (4,665 ft), above the village of Luchsingen and below the peaks of Glärnisch. Its surface area is 0.17 square kilometres (0.066 sq mi).

== See also ==
- List of mountain lakes of Switzerland
