= Mitlödi railway station =

Railway station in Switzerland

Mitlödi
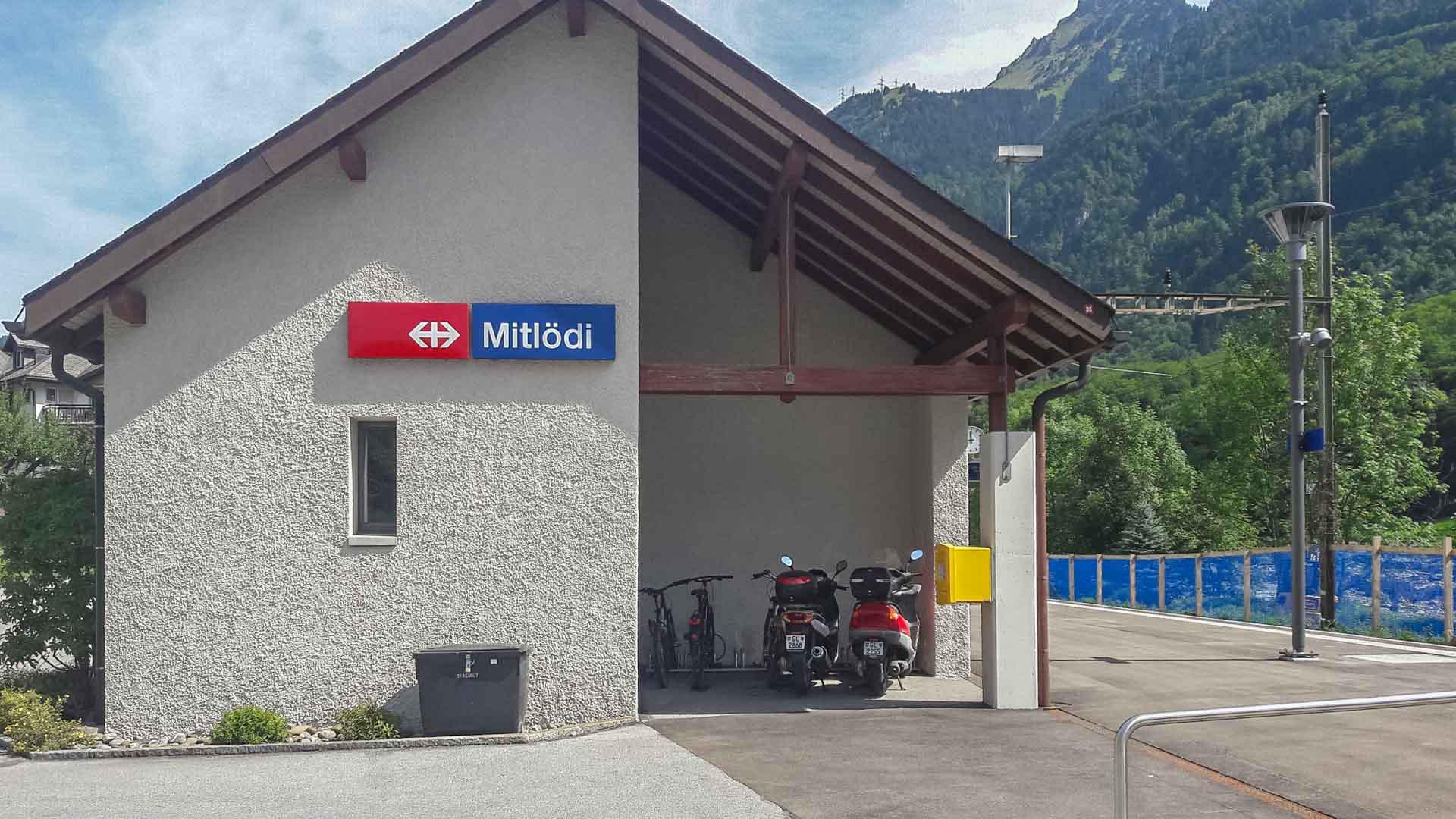
- The station building in 2017

General information
- Location: Bahnhofstrasse; Glarus Süd, Glarus; Switzerland
- Coordinates: 47°00′36″N 9°04′52″E
- Elevation: 503 m (1,650 ft)
- Owner: Swiss Federal Railways
- Line: Ziegelbrücke–Linthal line
- Distance: 72.3 km (44.9 mi) from Zürich
- Train operators: Südostbahn; Swiss Federal Railways

Other information
- Fare zone: 903 (Tarifverbund Ostwind)

Passengers
- 2018: 330 per weekday

Services
Preceding station	Zurich S-Bahn	Following station
Ennenda towards Zürich HB	S25	Schwanden towards Linthal
Preceding station	St. Gallen S-Bahn	Following station
Ennenda towards Rapperswil	S6	Schwanden towards Schwanden or Linthal
Location

Mitlödi railway station (German: Bahnhof Mitlödi) is a railway station in the municipality of Glarus Süd in the Swiss canton of Glarus. It is an intermediate stop on the Weesen to Linthal railway line, and serves the village of Mitlödi.

The station is served by Zürich S-Bahn service S25 between Zurich and Linthal, and by St. Gallen S-Bahn service S6 between Rapperswil and Schwanden. Both services operate once per hour, combining to provide two trains per hour between Ziegelbrücke and Schwanden.

== Services ==
As of the December 2020 timetable change, the following services stop at Mitlödi:

- St. Gallen S-Bahn S6: hourly service between Rapperswil and Schwanden.
- Zürich S-Bahn S25: hourly service between Zürich Hauptbahnhof and Linthal.
