= Nieder- and Oberurnen railway station =

Railway station in Switzerland

Nieder- and Oberurnen
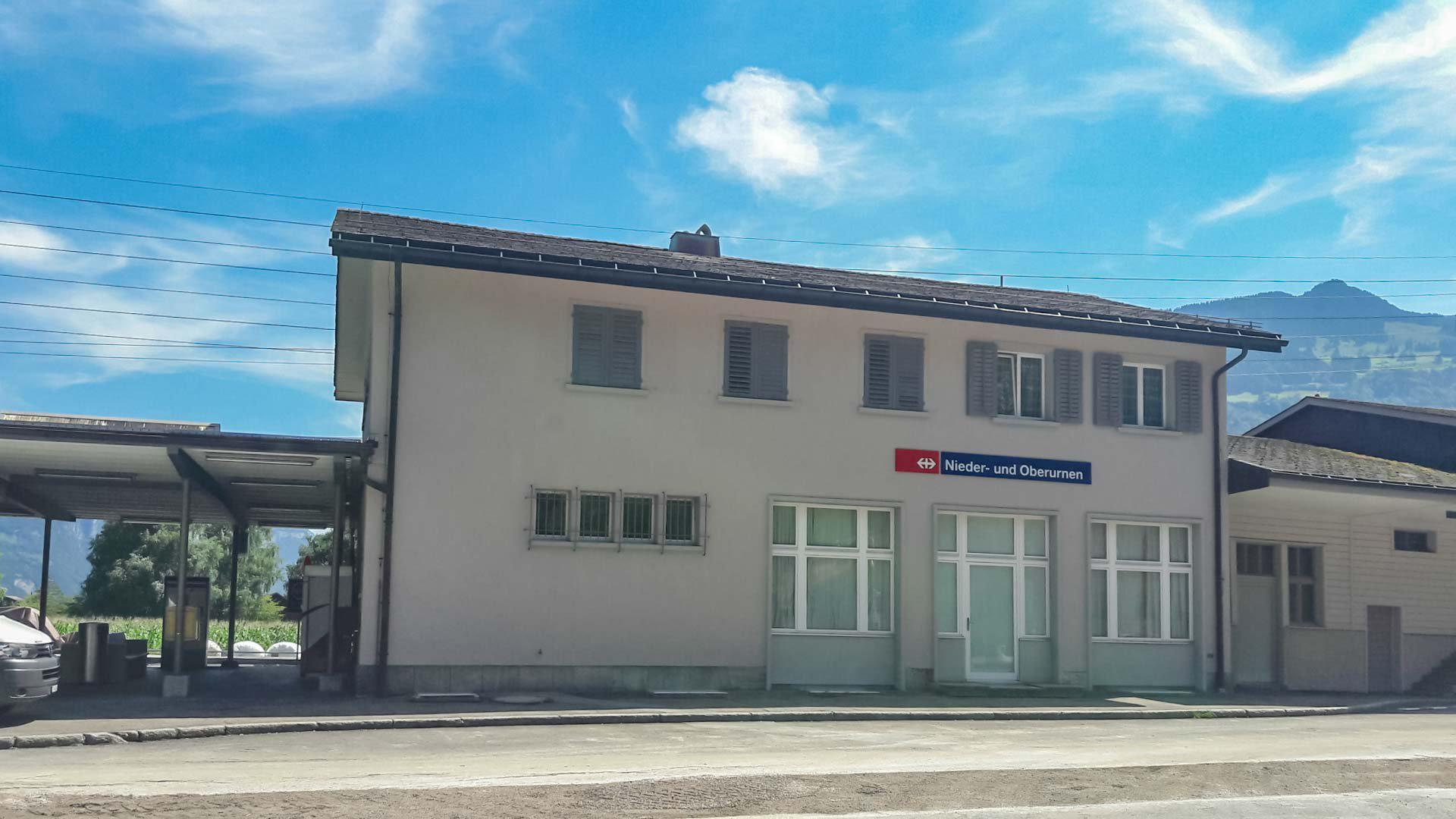
- The station building in 2017

General information
- Location: Bahnhofstrasse; Glarus Nord, Glarus; Switzerland
- Coordinates: 47°07′21″N 9°03′45″E
- Elevation: 428 m (1,404 ft)
- Owner: Swiss Federal Railways
- Line: Ziegelbrücke–Linthal line
- Distance: 58.9 km (36.6 mi) from Zürich
- Train operators: Südostbahn; Swiss Federal Railways

Other information
- Fare zone: 901 (Tarifverbund Ostwind)

Passengers
- 2018: 430 per weekday

Services
Preceding station	St. Gallen S-Bahn	Following station
Ziegelbrücke towards Rapperswil	S6	Näfels-Mollis towards Schwanden or Linthal
Location

Nieder- and Oberurnen railway station (German: Bahnhof Nieder- und Oberurnen) is a railway station in the municipality of Glarus Nord in the Swiss canton of Glarus. It is an intermediate stop on the Ziegelbrücke–Linthal line of Swiss Federal Railways, and serves the twin villages of Niederurnen and Oberurnen.

The station is served by the St. Gallen S-Bahn service S6 between Rapperswil and Schwanden, which operates hourly.

== Services ==
As of the December 2022 timetable change, the following services stop at Nieder- and Oberurnen:

- St. Gallen S-Bahn S6: hourly service between Rapperswil and Schwanden.
