= Luchsinger =

Luchsinger or Lucksinger is a surname. The name is believed to stem from the village of Luchsingen in the Swiss canton of Glarus.

Notable people with the surname include:

- Felix Luchsinger, Swiss curler
- Fritz Luchsinger (1921–1983), Swiss mountaineer
- Fritz Luchsinger, Swiss curler
- John Luchsinger, American legislator and pioneer
- Richard Luchsinger (1900–1993), Swiss doctor
- Susie Luchsinger, American singer
- Tom Luchsinger, American swimmer
- Paula Luchsinger (1994), Chilean actress
