= S25 (ZVV) =

Railway service in Switzerland

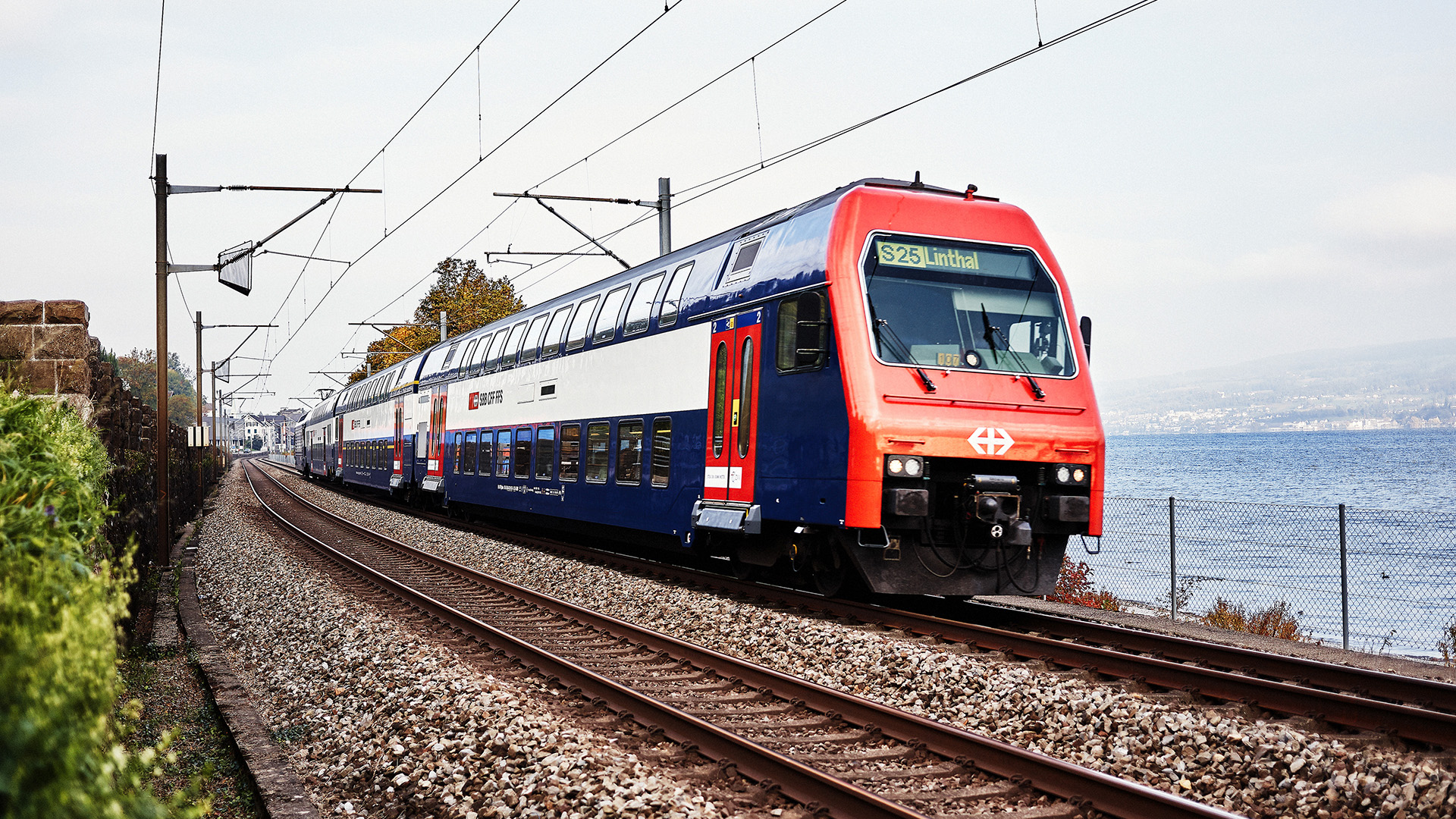
- S25 service passing by Lake Zurich

Overview
- Status: Operational
- Locale: Zürich, Switzerland
- Termini: Zürich Hauptbahnhof; Linthal
- Website: ZVV (in English)

Service
- Type: S-Bahn
- System: Zürich S-Bahn
- Operator(s): Zürcher Verkehrsverbund (ZVV)

Technical
- Track gauge: 1,435 mm (4 ft 8 1/2 in)

Zürich S-Bahn network as of December 2018

The S25 is a regional railway line of the S-Bahn Zürich on the Zürcher Verkehrsverbund (ZVV), Zürich transportation network, and is one of the network's lines connecting the cantons of Zürich with Schwyz, Glarus and St. Gallen. The line was introduced in July 2014, and replaces the less frequent Glarner Sprinter train.

At Zürich HB, trains of the S25 service usually depart from ground-level tracks (Gleis) 3–18.

== History ==
Between 1918 and 2004, there was no direct connection from the canton of Glarus to the city of Zürich. In 2004, the through Glarner Sprinter train was introduced, but financial and technical limitations meant this train only ran every two hours on weekdays, and twice a day on weekends and holidays. It also only reached Linthal, the terminus of the line in Glarus, on weekends and holidays. In July 2014, these limitations were finally overcome, and the Glarner Sprinter was replaced by the hourly S25 service to Linthal.

== Route ==
- S25 Zürich HB–Pfäffikon SZ–Ziegelbrücke–Glarus–Linthal
  Operates non stop between Zürich HB and Wädenswil.

The line links Zürich Hauptbahnhof with the canton of Glarus, terminating at the village of Linthal and the head of the valley of the Linth river. From the Hauptbahnhof, the line uses the Lake Zürich left-bank railway line to Ziegelbrücke, stopping only at a few selected stations. It then takes the Weesen-Linthal railway line to Linthal, stopping at all stations (except Nieder- und Oberurnen) including those for Glarus Town and Schwanden.

On its route, the line stops at the following stations:

- Zürich Hauptbahnhof
- Wädenswil
- Pfäffikon SZ
- Lachen
- Siebnen-Wangen
- Ziegelbrücke
- Näfels-Mollis
- Netstal
- Glarus
- Ennenda
- Mitlödi
- Schwanden
- Nidfurn-Haslen
- Leuggelbach
- Luchsingen-Hätzingen
- Diesbach-Betschwanden
- Rüti GL
- Linthal Braunwaldbahn
- Linthal

== Scheduling ==
Trains run hourly, covering the distance from Zürich Hauptbahnhof to Ziegelbrücke in 43 minutes, to Glarus in 60 minutes, and to Linthal in 94 minutes. Despite being classified as an S-Bahn train, the S25 actually covers the distance between Zürich Hauptbahnhof and Ziegelbrücke in a shorter time than the parallel InterRegio service to Chur. This mirrors the performance of its predecessor, the Glarner Sprinter named train, which was itself classified as a RegioExpress service.

For its journey along the Lake Zürich left-bank line, the S25 is paralleled by other Zürich S-Bahn lines that provide more frequent, but slower, service. Principally amongst these, the S2 runs every 30 minutes as far as Ziegelbrücke, whilst the S8 runs every 30 minutes as far as Pfäffikon SZ. Between Ziegelbrücke and Schwanden, the S25 is paralleled by the hourly St. Gallen S-Bahn service S6, thus providing a half-hourly service.

== See also ==
- Rail transport in Switzerland
- List of railway stations in Zurich
- Public transport in Zurich
- ZVV fare zones
