= Ziegelbrücke–Linthal railway =

Railway line in Switzerland

Weesen–Linthal railway
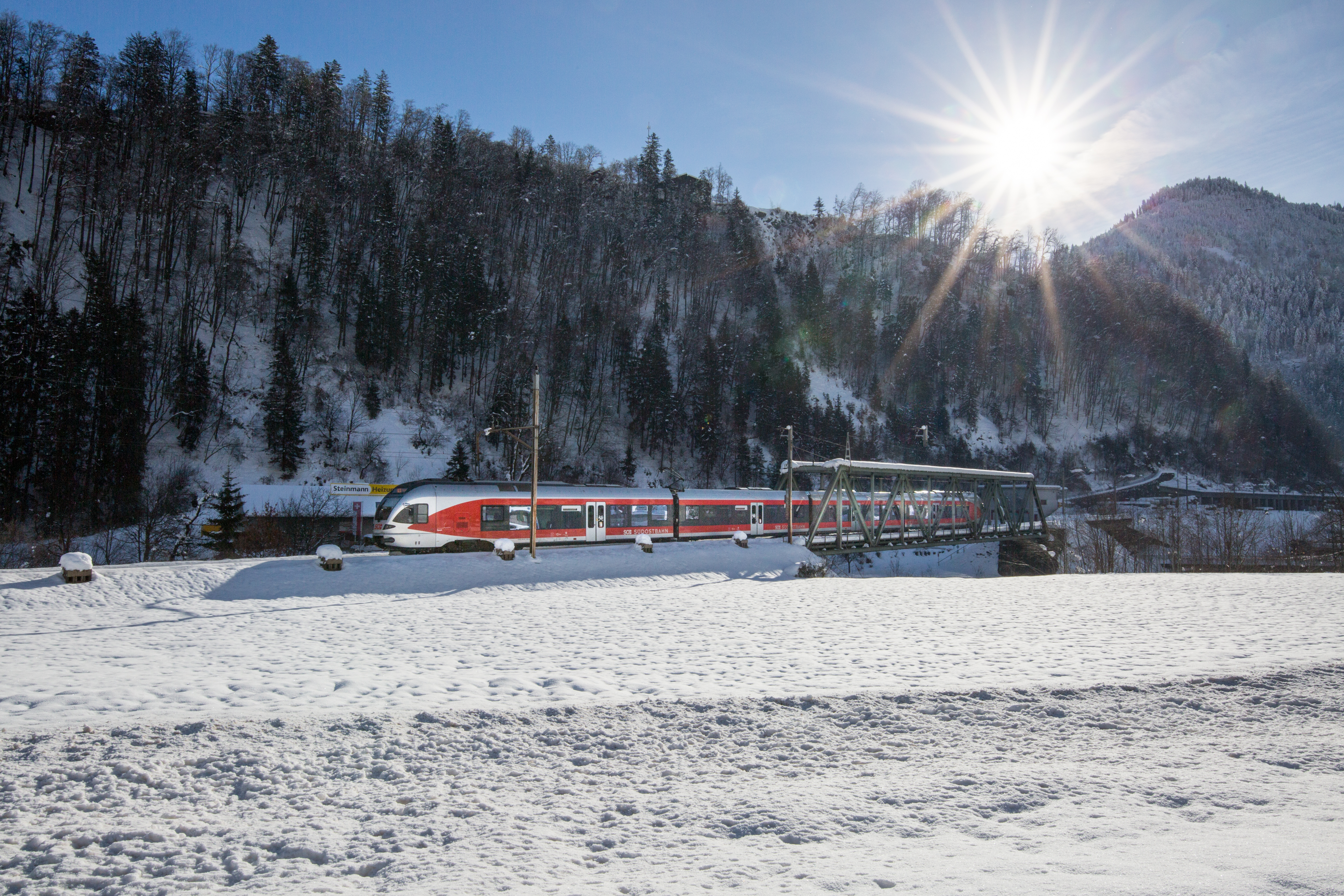
- Südostbahn FLIRT trainset near Schwanden

Overview
- Owner: Swiss Federal Railways
- Line number: 736
- Termini: Ziegelbrücke; Linthal

Technical
- Number of tracks: 1
- Track gauge: 1,435 mm (4 ft 8 1/2 in) standard gauge
- Electrification: 15 kV/16.7 Hz AC overhead catenary

The Ziegelbrücke–Linthal railway (formerly the Weesen–Linthal railway, also called the Glarnerlinie—lit. 'Glarus line'), is a single-track standard-gauge line in the Swiss cantons of Glarus and St. Gallen, connecting Ziegelbrücke with Linthal.

It was opened in two stages and by two railway companies. The line from Weesen via Näfels-Mollis to Glarus was opened on 15 February 1859 by the United Swiss Railways (Vereinigte Schweizerbahnen, VSB). It was opened with the Rüti–Rapperswil–Weesen line. The line from Glarus via Schwanden to Linthal was opened on 1 June 1879 by the Swiss Northeastern Railway (Schweizerische Nordostbahn, NOB).

The Lake Zürich left-bank railway, which was built by the NOB, was extended from Ziegelbrücke to Näfels-Mollis station on 20 September 1875. This line took over much of the traffic between Weesen and Näfels-Mollis, making the old line unprofitable. Therefore, the line was closed by the Swiss Federal Railways (SBB) on 1 January 1931 and later dismantled. Weesen station was relocated on the occasion of the opening of the double-track line on 18 May 1969.

There was a connection in Schwanden to the metre-gauge Sernftal tramway between 7 August 1905 and 31 May 1969.

The line was electrified on 15 May 1933 at 15 kV AC 16^{2}/_{3} Hz.

== Stations ==
Initially, all stations had at least one bay platform apart from the main platform (with only one turnout on one side). The only exception was Leuggelbach, which as a result has always been classified as a halt. The halt of Linthal Braunwaldbahn was opened at the timetable change on 23 May 1982, when the clock-face timetable was also introduced. This new halt is located immediately adjacent to the base station of the Braunwald Funicular, which simplified the transfer from the rail network to the funicular to Braunwald.

No crossing loops were planned in Ennenda, Mitlödi and Rüti, as they would have been difficult to install because of the bay platforms.

A rolling stock depot was established in Glarus with two locomotive sheds and a turntable. Glarus station was extensively renovated in 2016 and 2017 so that platform 2 is now accessible via an underpass and the locomotive sheds have been renovated. However, they are no longer used for storing trains and can only be used by non-electrically hauled rolling stock because of the lack of overhead lines. The former Glarus depot was replaced by the Ziegelbrücke depot.

The Nidfurn-Haslen and Rüti stations were reclassified as halts on 2 June 1984. Mitlödi station was similarly reclassified at the 1985 timetable change.

Except for the track infrastructure in Schwanden, all sets of points and additional track infrastructure between Glarus and Linthal was upgraded at the end of the 1990s and the beginning of the 2000s. There is now only one track between Glarus and Linthal. The only remaining stations with crossing loops are Nieder- and Oberurnen, Glarus, Schwanden and Linthal. It is possible for trains to cross in Näfels-Mollis and Netstal and this can occur in case of disruption of normal services, but both stations only have one regular 55 cm-high platform each, so embarking and disembarking passengers would only be possible for one of the crossing trains. Currently (as of April 2018), the Netstal station has an old, non-standard platform on track 2 and this could be used during a disruption of operations, but it would require special provisions.

== Operations ==
The route is served by hourly services on line S25 of Zurich S-Bahn. It replaced the Glarner Sprinter in June 2014 and serves all stations (except Nieder- and Oberurnen) on this line as well as Siebnen-Wangen, Lachen, Pfäffikon SZ, Wädenswil and Zürich HB. This is the first time there have been hourly services to Zurich. Services on line S6 of the St. Gallen S-Bahn also run on the Ziegelbrücke–Schwanden route hourly, resulting in a combined half-hourly cycle. Some off-peak hour S6 services continue to Linthal.

== Extension plans ==
An extension of the route to the south to Biasca in the canton of Ticino, connecting to the Gotthard Railway towards Chiasso was considered around 1900. In 1963, the Schweizerische Aktionskomitee pro Tödi-Greina-Bahn (Swiss Action Committee for the Tödi-Greina Railway), which had representatives from several cantonal governments, commissioned a study to examine the feasibility of a Tödi–Greina railway. These plans were not pursued.
