= Linthal railway station =

Railway station in Switzerland

Linthal
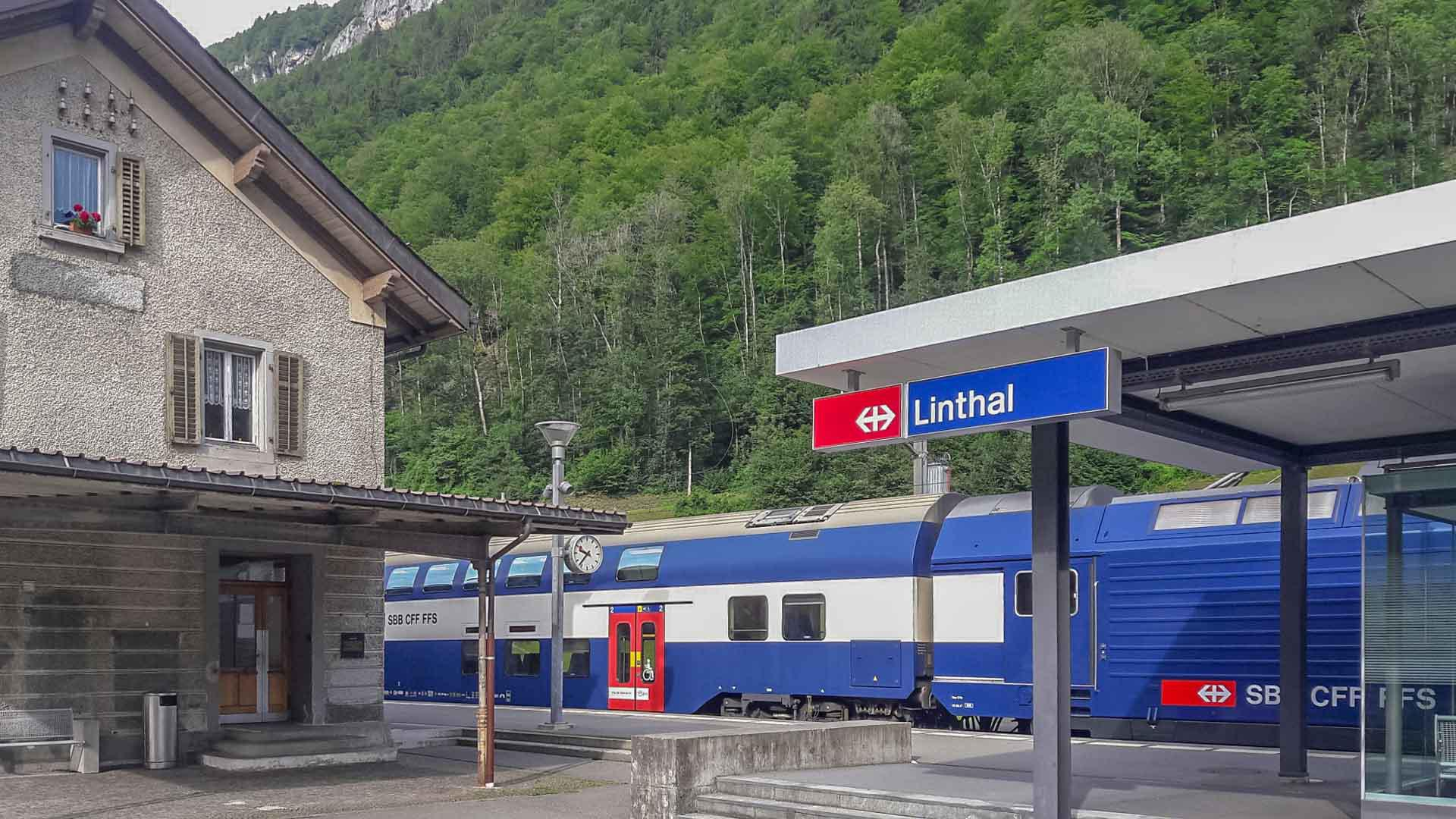
- Linthal railway station, southern terminus of S25 service of Zürich S-Bahn

General information
- Location: Bahnhofstrasse; Linthal; Glarus Süd, Glarus; Switzerland
- Coordinates: 46.925289°N 8.997921°E
- Elevation: 648 m (2,126 ft)
- Owner: Swiss Federal Railways
- Operator: Swiss Federal Railways
- Line: Weesen-Linthal
- Connections: Postbus Switzerland; Urnerboden Sprinter minibus

Services
Preceding station	Zurich S-Bahn	Following station
Linthal Braunwaldbahn towards Zürich HB	S25	Terminus
Location
- Location within Switzerland

Linthal railway station is a railway station in the municipality of Glarus Süd in the Swiss canton of Glarus. It is the terminus of the Weesen to Linthal railway line, and serves the village of Linthal.

The station is the terminus of the hourly Zürich S-Bahn service S25 from Zurich.

The station is also the terminus of a PostBus Switzerland service to Fluelen station, on the Gothard railway and Lake Lucerne, which provides several daily return journeys across the Klausen Pass between May and September. Outside that period, a minibus service called the Urnerboden Sprinter provides three connections a day to Urnerboden on the route to the pass.

== Services ==
As of the December 2023 timetable change, the following services call at Linthal railway station:

- St. Gallen S-Bahn:
  - S6: hourly service to Rapperswil via Ziegelbrücke (only during off-peak hours).
- Zürich S-Bahn:
  - S25: hourly service to Zürich HB via Ziegelbrücke.
