= Ricken Tunnel railway accident =

Railway accident

Ricken Tunnel Railway Accident
- Location in Switzerland

Details
- Date: October 4, 1926; 12:01 pm
- Location: Ricken Tunnel, St. Gallen
- Coordinates: 47°14′59″N 9°3′28″E
- Country: Switzerland

Statistics
- Trains: 1
- Crew: 6
- Deaths: 9

The Ricken Tunnel railway accident killed six crew members of a freight train and three rescuers on October 4, 1926, through carbon monoxide poisoning in the Ricken Tunnel between Kaltbrunn and Wattwil in the Swiss Alps.

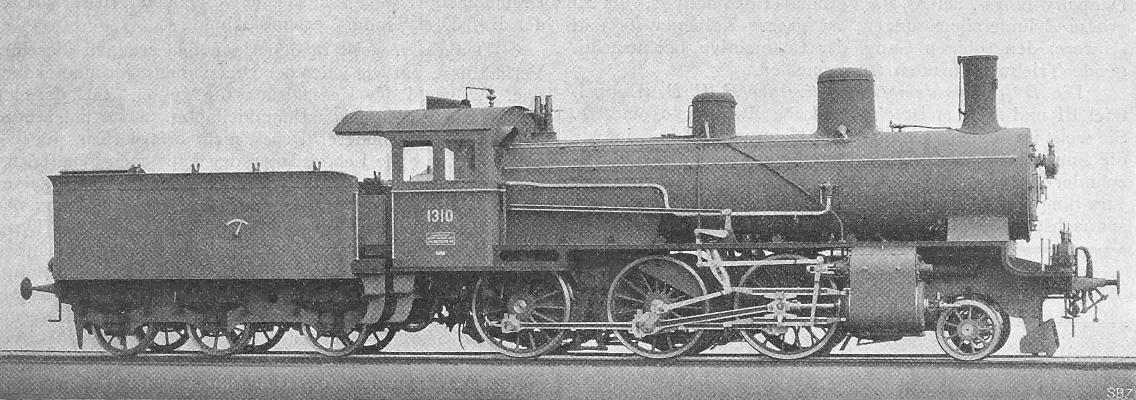
The freight train involved in the accident was led by an SBB B 3/4.

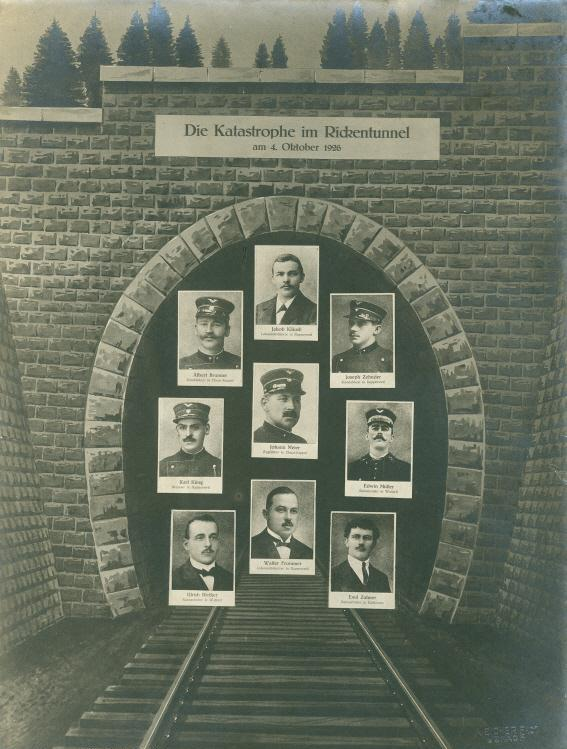
Portraits of the 9 victims on a painting of the tunnel portal

The Ricken Tunnel lies under the Ricken Pass and is part of the single-track SBB-operated Uznach–Wattwil line. It is 8.6 kilometres (5.3 mi) long, with a cross-sectional area of 25.5 square metres (274 ft^{2}) and a constant incline of 15.75 ‰. The tunnel lacks artificial ventilation. The tunnel was widely disliked by railway personnel during the era of steam operation due to the danger of gas buildup.

The crew of passenger train #3616, which left Wattwil earlier that morning at 11:05 am and arrived in Kaltbrunn at 11:20 am, did not notice any significant gas buildup in the tunnel.

== Accident ==
At 11:55 am, freight train #6854 left Kaltbrunn station. The train, led by a B 3/4 steam locomotive, had six Swiss Federal Railways personnel aboard and a trailing load of 252 tonnes (278 short tons). It entered the tunnel at a speed of 20 kilometres per hour (12 mph). The locomotive's maximum trailing load for this route at the time was 260 tonnes (290 short tons).

As the train continued uphill through the tunnel, its speed gradually decreased due to insufficient steam generation. After 6 1/2 minutes or 1 kilometre (0.62 mi) of travel, the train got stuck on the incline because it was using low-quality fuel briquettes. The locomotive crew failed to get the train moving again.

Due to poor ventilation in the tunnel, there wasn't enough oxygen for the steam locomotive's fire, resulting in incomplete combustion. Consequently, the locomotive's exhaust gases increasingly consisted of toxic carbon monoxide instead of non-toxic carbon dioxide. Carbon monoxide binds with hemoglobin in the blood, blocking the ability of red blood cells to transport oxygen throughout the body. Forensic investigations later confirmed that the victims suffocated from carbon monoxide.

According to the Swiss Federal Office of Meteorology and Climatology, there was an exceptionally strong anticyclone (high-pressure area) on the north side of the Alps on the day of the incident. The lack of air-pressure difference prevented the toxic smoke from escaping the tunnel.

== Rescue attempts ==
An eight-person rescue team came from Wattwil in a passenger car with breathing equipment. Due to poor visibility, the rescuers could only advance step-by-step to the accident site for the last kilometer. Since several helpers became unconscious, the rescue attempt had to be abandoned. Nevertheless, they still managed to bring the crew's unconscious fireman back to Wattwil.

Two of the rescuers had to be left in the tunnel. One rescuer and the fireman died upon being brought back to Wattwil.

A later attempt from Kaltbrunn to reach the accident site with a rescue train also failed. Only after 8 pm, with the help of a handcar, respirators, and oxygen masks, were they able to reach the accident site from Kaltbrunn. By that point, recovery work was no longer hindered by smoke and gas. The train crew and the two rescuers from Wattwil were found dead, raising the death toll to nine. The victims on the train were found lying or sitting in the wagons. Two of the victims were found outside of the train, in alcoves in the tunnel. One of the deceased rescuers from Wattwil had apparently tried to contact the station using the tunnel telephone. When the rescue team arrived, the train's kerosene lanterns were still burning, but the briquettes on the grate had burned out.

== Aftermath ==
Following the accident, the allowed trailing load of the trains was reduced, and train staff were equipped with oxygen masks. In Wattwil and Kaltbrunn, rescue equipment was installed. Shortly after the accident, the line would be electrified. On May 7, 1927, electric operation on the Rapperswil–Wattwil route, including the tunnel, commenced.

== Previous incident ==
On March 1, 1916, there was an accident involving smoke gases near the middle of the Ricken Tunnel in which four railway workers lost consciousness. One of them managed to alert the Wattwil station, leading to a search and rescue operation. One of the rescuers also became unconscious and needed medical attention.
