= Bollingen railway station =

Disused railway station in Switzerland

Bollingen
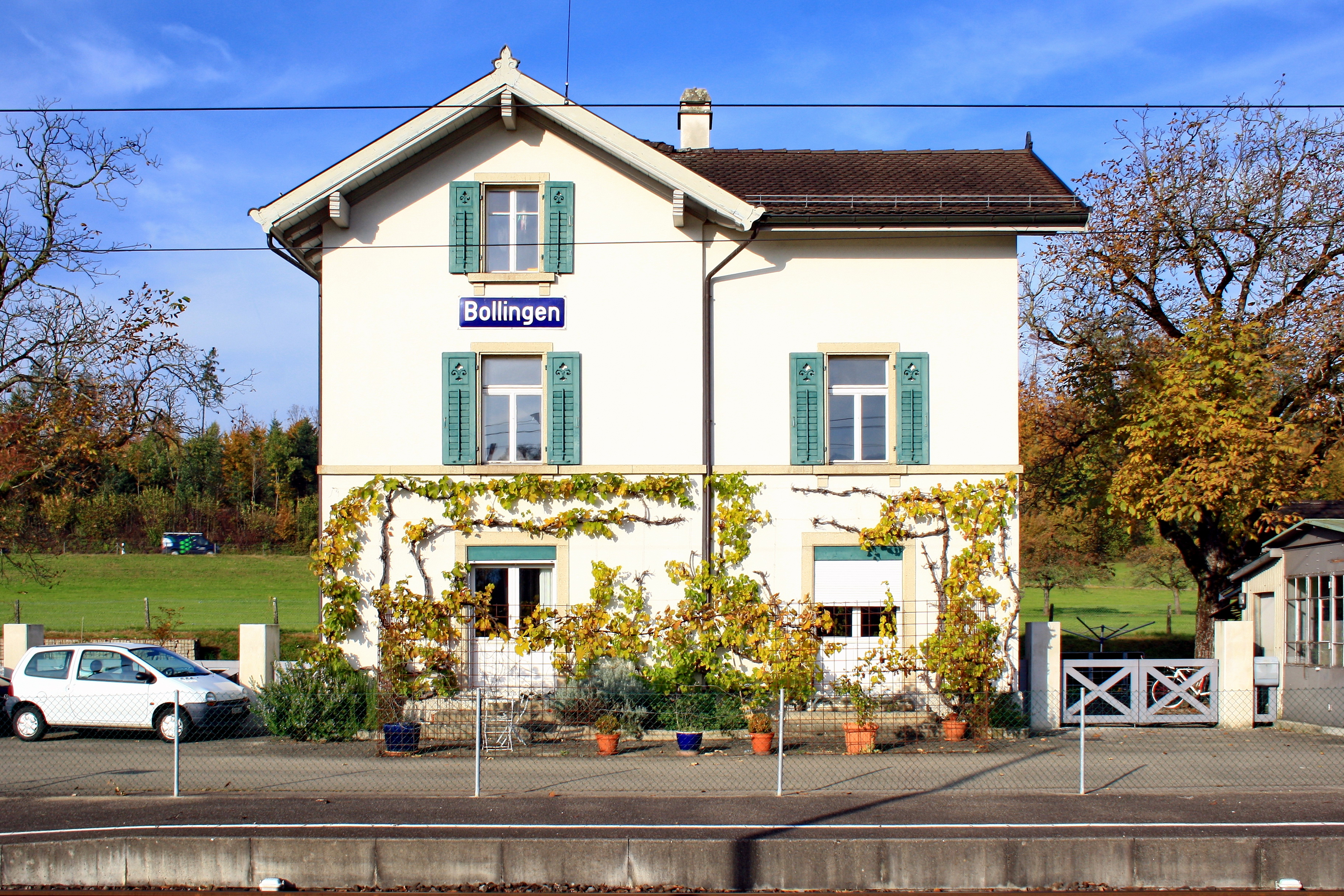
- The station building in 2009

General information
- Other names: Bahnhof Bollingen
- Location: Staffeln 8, Jona; Switzerland
- Coordinates: 47°13′2.7″N 08°52′45.2″E
- Elevation: 409.5 m (1,344 ft)
- Operator: Swiss Federal Railways (until 2004)
- Line: Rapperswil–Ziegelbrücke railway
- Platforms: 2 (demolished in 2021)
- Tracks: 2 (German: Gleis)

Construction
- Structure type: at-grade
- Platform levels: 1
Location
- Location within Switzerland Location within Canton of St. Gallen

Bollingen railway station (German: Bahnhof Bollingen) was until 2004 a railway station in the municipality of Rapperswil-Jona (former Jona municipality) in the canton of St. Gallen, Switzerland. It is located about 1 km (0.62 mi) west of the village of Bollingen on the Rapperswil–Ziegelbrücke railway line, between Blumenau and Schmerikon.

== History ==
After the nearby Blumenau station opened in the 1980s, Bollingen station was closed in 2004 for economic reasons. The platforms were removed in 2021, but the station building, including the nameplate, and double-tracked section at the station remained (the tracks were renewed in 2023 when the section between Schmerikon and Uznach was upgraded to double-track). It is the only double-tracked section on the otherwise single-tracked line between Rapperswil and Schmerikon stations. The double-tracked section is used for unscheduled train crossings.

== See also ==
- Ghost station
