= Kaltbrunn railway station =

Railway station in Kaltbrunn, Switzerland

Kaltbrunn
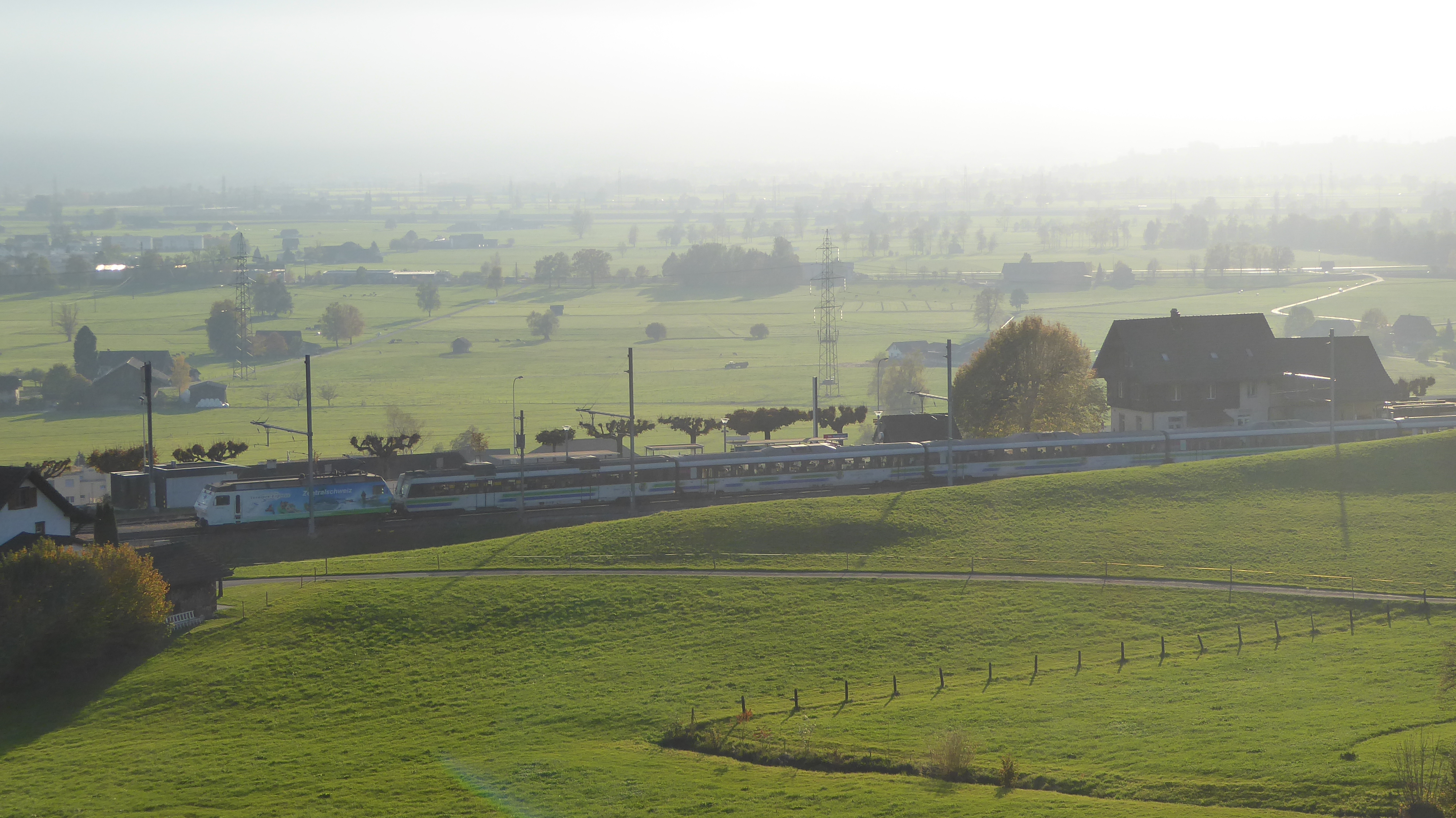
- The Voralpen Express passes through Kaltbrunn in 2017

General information
- Location: Bahnhofstrasse; Kaltbrunn; Switzerland
- Coordinates: 47°13′N 9°01′E
- Elevation: 470 m (1,540 ft)
- Owner: Swiss Federal Railways
- Line: Uznach–Wattwil
- Train operators: Südostbahn

Other information
- Fare zone: 992 (Tarifverbund Ostwind)

Services
Preceding station	St. Gallen S-Bahn	Following station
Uznach towards Rapperswil	S4	Wattwil towards Sargans
Location
- Location within Switzerland Location within Canton of St. Gallen

Kaltbrunn railway station is a railway station situated in the municipality of Kaltbrunn in the Swiss canton of St. Gallen. It is located on the Uznach to Wattwil line, close to the western portal of the 8.6 kilometres (5.3 mi) long Ricken Tunnel.

== Services ==
As of the December 2023 timetable change, the following services stop at Kaltbrunn:

- St. Gallen S-Bahn S4: hourly service between Rapperswil and Sargans via St. Gallen.

== See also ==
- Rail transport in Switzerland
