= Schänis railway station =

Railway station in Switzerland

Schänis
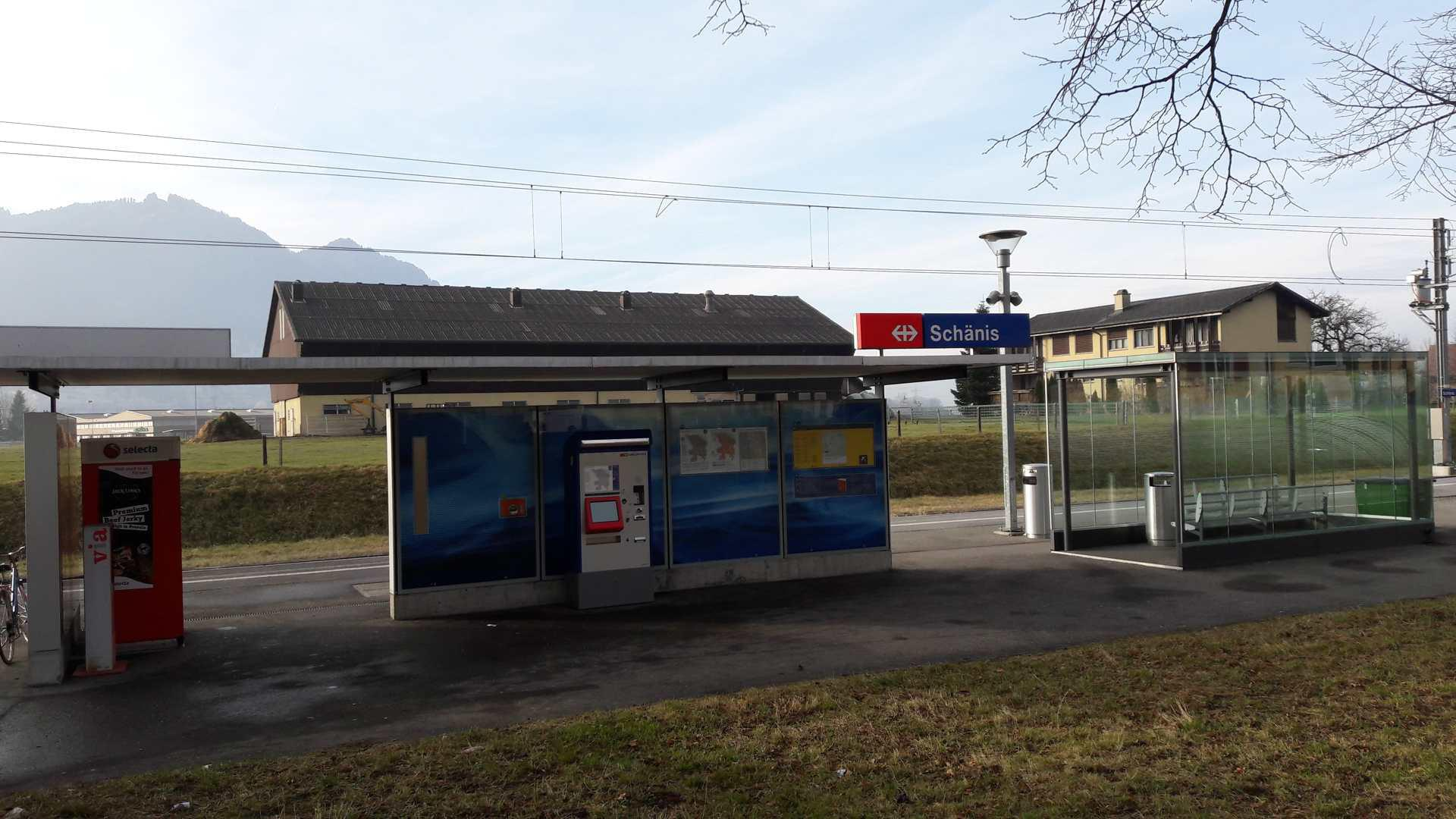
- The station platform in 2016

General information
- Location: Ziegelbrückstrasse; Schänis, St. Gallen; Switzerland
- Coordinates: 47°09′28″N 9°02′38″E
- Elevation: 420 m (1,380 ft)
- Owner: Swiss Federal Railways
- Line: Rapperswil–Ziegelbrücke
- Distance: 37.1 km (23.1 mi) from Sargans
- Train operators: Südostbahn
- Connections: PostAuto Schweiz buses

Other information
- Fare zone: 991 (Tarifverbund Ostwind)

Passengers
- 2018: 720 per weekday

Services
Preceding station	St. Gallen S-Bahn	Following station
Benken towards Rapperswil	S6	Ziegelbrücke towards Schwanden or Linthal
Benken towards Rapperswil	S17	Ziegelbrücke towards Sargans
Location
- Location within Switzerland Location within Canton of St. Gallen

Schänis railway station (German: Bahnhof Schänis) is a railway station in the municipality of Schänis in the Swiss canton of St. Gallen. It is on the Rapperswil to Ziegelbrücke line. It is one of two railway stations in the Gemarkung of Schänis, the other being the much larger Ziegelbrücke railway station at the border to Canton Glarus.

== Services ==
As of the December 2023 timetable change, the following services stop at Schänis:

- St. Gallen S-Bahn S6 / S17: half-hourly service between Rapperswil and Ziegelbrücke and hourly service to Schwanden / Linthal or Sargans.
