= Benken railway station =

Railway station in Benken, Switzerland

Benken
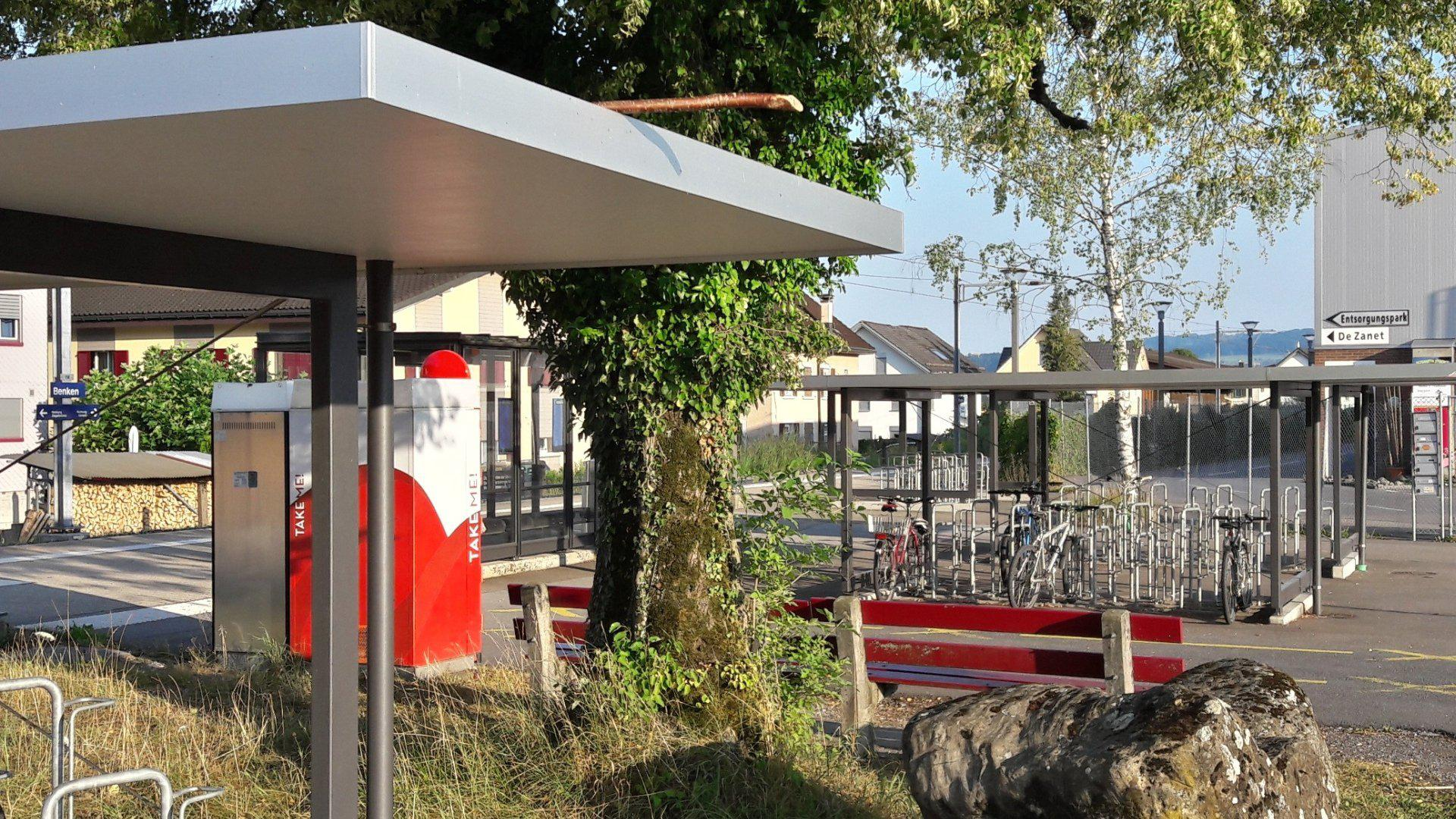
- The station in 2018

General information
- Location: Benknerstrasse; Benken, St. Gallen; Switzerland
- Coordinates: 47°12′16″N 9°00′31″E
- Elevation: 416 m (1,365 ft)
- Owner: Swiss Federal Railways
- Line: Rapperswil–Ziegelbrücke
- Distance: 43.4 km (27.0 mi) from Sargans
- Train operators: Südostbahn
- Connections: PostAuto Schweiz buses

Other information
- Fare zone: 992 (Tarifverbund Ostwind)

Passengers
- 2018: 340 per weekday

Services
| Preceding station | St. Gallen S-Bahn | Following station |
|---|---|---|
| Uznach towards Rapperswil | S6 | Schänis towards Schwanden or Linthal |
| Uznach towards Rapperswil | S17 | Schänis towards Sargans |
Location
- Location within Switzerland Location within Canton of St. Gallen

Benken railway station (German: Bahnhof Benken) is a railway station situated in the municipality of Benken in the Swiss canton of St. Gallen. It is located on the Rapperswil to Ziegelbrücke line.

== Services ==
As of the December 2023 timetable change, the following services stop at Benken:

- St. Gallen S-Bahn S6 / S17: half-hourly service between Rapperswil and Ziegelbrücke and hourly service to Schwanden / Linthal or Sargans.
