= Schmerikon railway station =

Railway station in Switzerland

Schmerikon
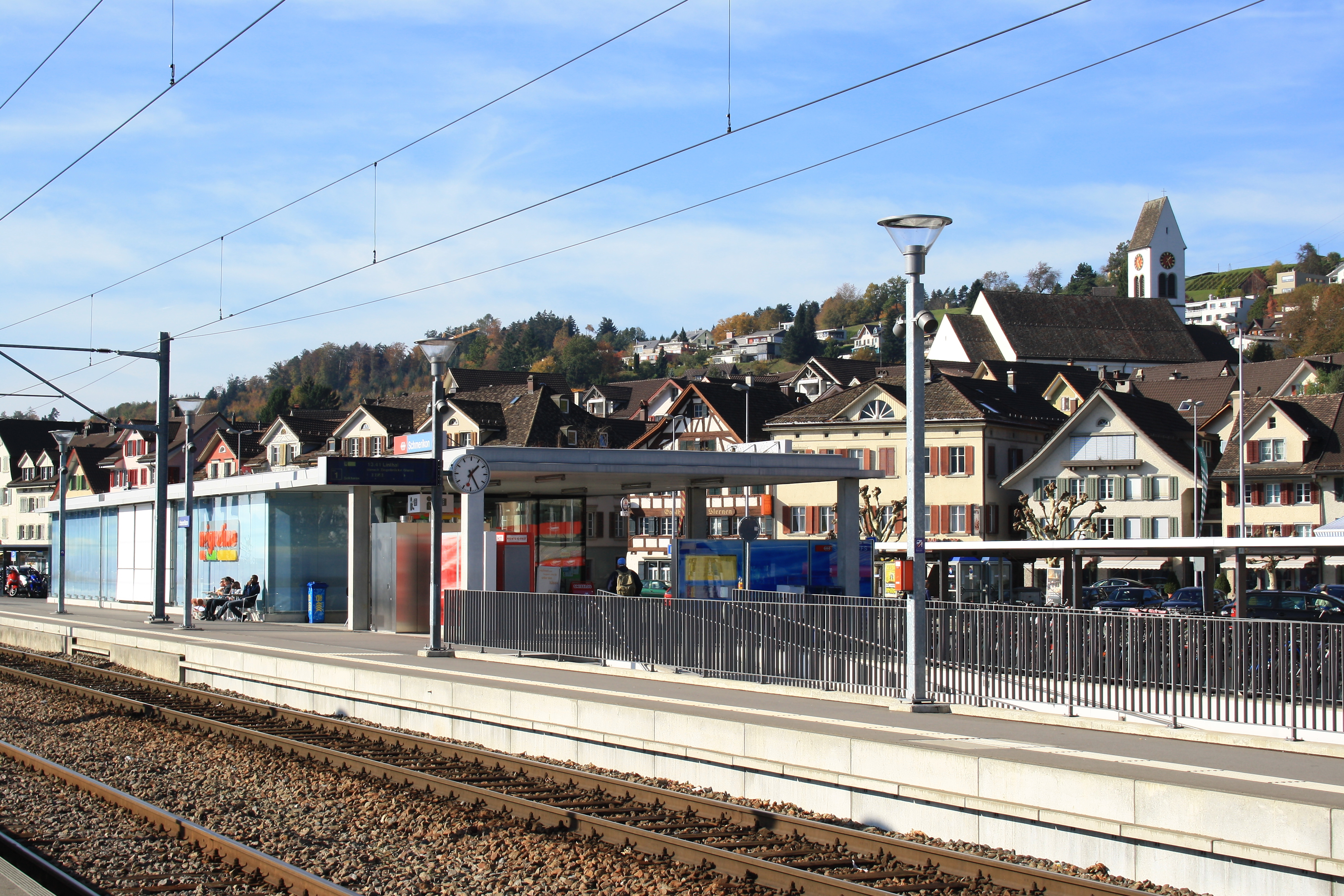
- The station platform in 2009

General information
- Location: Bahnhofstrasse; Schmerikon, St. Gallen; Switzerland
- Coordinates: 47°13′31″N 8°56′36″E
- Elevation: 407 m (1,335 ft)
- Owner: Swiss Federal Railways
- Line: Rapperswil–Ziegelbrücke
- Distance: 49.3 km (30.6 mi) from Sargans
- Train operators: Südostbahn
- Connections: ZVV / Ostwind
- Ship: ZSG passenger ships
- Bus: PostAuto Schweiz bus route 630

Other information
- Fare zone: 995 (Tarifverbund Ostwind)

Passengers
- 2018: 1,400 per weekday

Services
Preceding station	St. Gallen S-Bahn	Following station
Blumenau towards Rapperswil	S6	Uznach towards Schwanden or Linthal
Blumenau towards Rapperswil	S17	Uznach towards Sargans
Location
- Location within Switzerland Location within Canton of St. Gallen

Schmerikon railway station (German: Bahnhof Schmerikon) is a railway station situated in the municipality of Schmerikon in the Swiss canton of St. Gallen. It is located next to the shore of Obersee on the Rapperswil to Ziegelbrücke line.

== Services ==
=== S-Bahn ===
The station is served by St. Gallen S-Bahn services S6, which operates south-east to Schwanden via Ziegelbrücke and westward to Rapperswil, and S17, which operates between Rapperswil and Sargans via Ziegelbrücke. Both these lines run hourly, combining to provide a half-hourly service to Rapperswil and Ziegelbrücke.

As of the December 2023 timetable change, the following S-Bahn services stop at Schmerikon railway station:

- St. Gallen S-Bahn S6 / S17: half-hourly service between Rapperswil and Ziegelbrücke and hourly service to Schwanden / Linthal or Sargans.

=== Bus and boat ===
There is a nearby bus stop served by buses of PostAuto Schweiz.

A landing stage located 240 m (790 ft) to the west of the railway station is served by passenger boat lines of Zürichsee Schifffahrtsgesellschaft (ZSG). The landing stage is within fare zone 183 of the Zürcher Verkehrsverbund (ZVV).

== History ==
The next railway station to the west is now Blumenau, but until 2004 it used to be Bollingen. Until December 2023, the station was served by the inter-regional Voralpen Express, which links Lucerne and St. Gallen.
