= Rapperswil–Ziegelbrücke railway line =

Railway line in Switzerland

Rapperswil–Ziegelbrücke
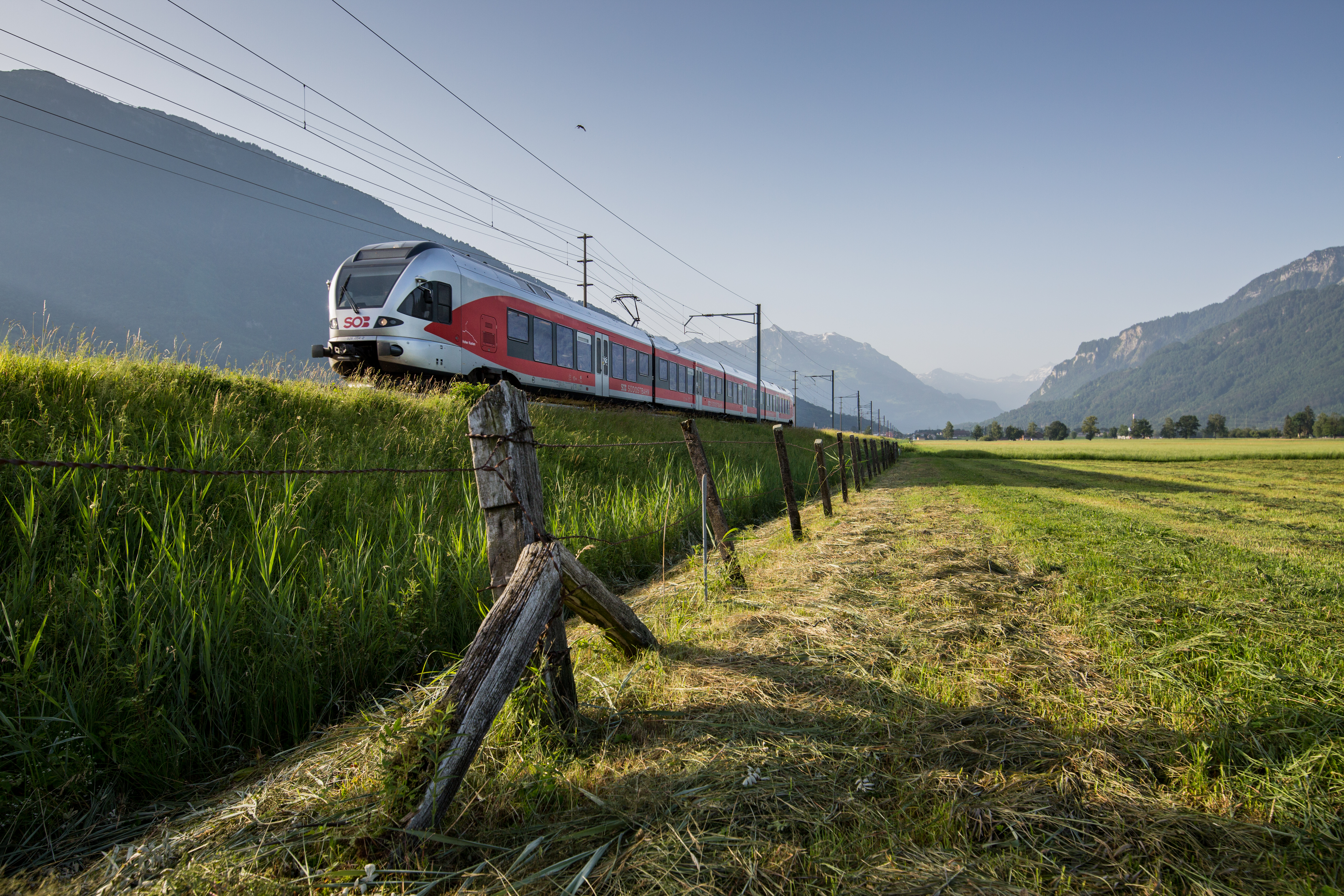
- A Südostbahn FLIRT near Schänis in 2019

Overview
- Owner: Swiss Federal Railways
- Line number: 735
- Termini: Rapperswil; Ziegelbrücke

Technical
- Line length: 25.02 km (15.55 mi)
- Number of tracks: 1
- Track gauge: 1,435 mm (4 ft 8 1/2 in) standard gauge
- Electrification: 15 kV/16.7 Hz AC overhead catenary

The Rapperswil–Ziegelbrücke railway line is a single-track standard-gauge railway line in Switzerland. It was built as part of the route from Rüti to Glarus, which was opened by the United Swiss Railways (German: Vereinigte Schweizerbahnen, VSB) on 15 February 1859.

== History ==
The line was built as an extension of the Wallisellen–Uster–Rapperswil railway (Glatthalbahn), which had been extended from Wetzikon to Rüti on 15 August 1858 after its acquisition by the VSB. The line was opened at the same time as the Murg–Sargans line. The intervening section between Weesen and Murg was not completed until 1 July 1859. The line shortened the distance between Zurich and Chur. Its importance as a long-distance line was reduced by the opening on 20 September 1875 by the Swiss Northeast Railway (Schweizerische Nordostbahn) of the Lake Zürich left-bank railway, which runs from Zürich to Näfels via Pfäffikon and Ziegelbrücke. As a result, the Rapperswil–Ziegelbrücke line was never duplicated. It experienced increased use Between Rapperswil and Uznach with the opening of the Uznach–Wattwil railway on 1 October 1910.

The route between Rapperswil and Uznach was electrified in connection with a train accident in the Ricken tunnel on the Uznach–Wattwil railway on 4 October 1926 that led to the death nine people as a result of suffocation from carbon monoxide poisoning. Electrification of the line was completed on 7 May 1927 at 15 kV AC 16^{2}/_{3} Hz. Electrification of the line between Uznach and Ziegelbrücke (continuing to Linthal) followed on 15 May 1933.

The route between Uznach and Schmerikon was expanded to dual track. Construction began in summer 2021. With the timetable change on 10 December 2023, the new double-track was officially opened, which allowed for more frequented traffic between Rapperswil and Uznach (four trains per hour and direction).

== Route ==
The line follows the right bank of the Obersee at the upper end of Lake Zurich from Rapperswil to near Schmerikon. It continues to the east and turns to the southwest after Uznach station towards Benken and runs east around the Benken hillock and then to the south-southwest in a straight line via the Gastermatt to Schänis and on to Ziegelbrücke. The line has no major engineering structures.

Bollingen station between Wurmsbach Abbey and the village of Bollingen, near Stafel, was closed for scheduled train services with the 2004 timetable change and replaced by the halt of Blumenau, which had been refurbished in the 1980s and again in the early 2020s. The platforms of Bollingen station were demolished in 2021.

== Operations ==
The whole line is served by the S6 of the St. Gallen S-Bahn on the Rapperswil–Ziegelbrücke–Schwanden route (these services continue to Linthal during off-peak hours, until December 2013 during the whole day) and the S17 (St. Gallen S-Bahn) on the Rapperswil–Ziegelbrücke–Sargans route (introduced with the timetable change in December 2023). Together, they combine for half-hourly service on the whole line. Between Rapperswil and Uznach, the line is used by the hourly S4 service of St. Gallen S-Bahn (continues eastwards to Wattwil, St. Gallen and Sargans) and the hourly IR Voralpen-Express. Both of these services do not call at stations between Rapperswil and Uznach. Until the timetable change on 10 December 2023, the section between Uznach and Rapperswil was used only be the S6 and Voralpen-Express, with combined half-hourly service. The Voralpen-Express also called at Schmerikon, while Blumenau was only served by the S6.

Freight trains have not generally used the line since 2006, when Uznach was closed for freight traffic. However, the line is regularly used for nocturnal diversions for work on the Pfäffikon–Lachen–Ziegelbrücke line.

== Rolling stock ==
The regional service between Rapperswil and Linthal was operated for decades after the electrification with fir green trains, which were hauled by Ae 3/6 I and Ae 4/7 locomotives. These were replaced in the late 1980s and early 1990s by Neuer Pendelzug (new push-pull trains, NPZ) RBDe 4/4 sets, which are nicknamed "Hummingbirds" because of their colourful paintwork. The rolling stock now consists only of NPZ "Domino 3" push-pull trains, which are coupled in the rush hour to form 6-car sets.
