= Uznach railway station =

Railway station in the Swiss canton of St. Gallen

Uznach
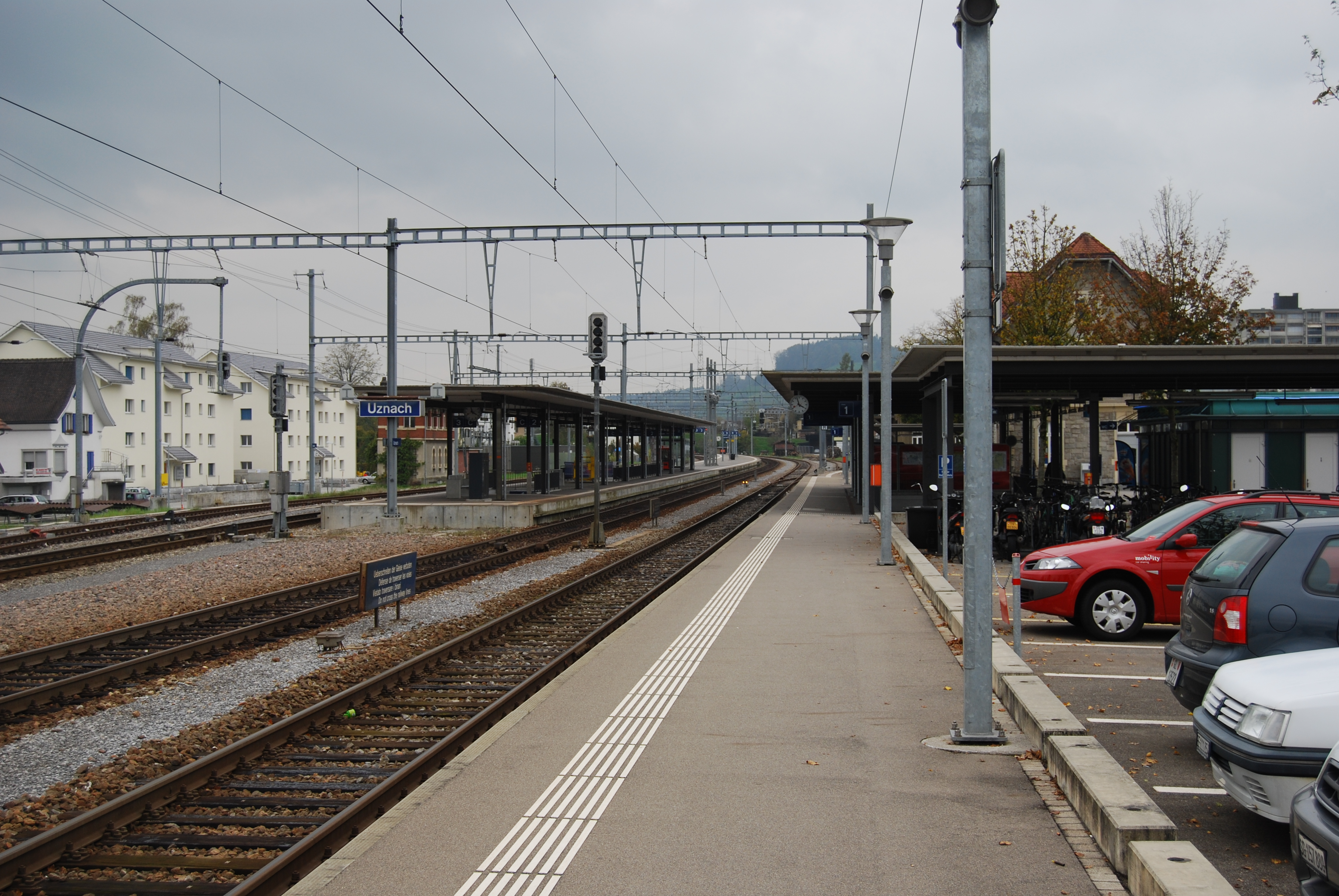
- The station in 2010

General information
- Location: Bahnhofstrasse; Uznach, St. Gallen; Switzerland
- Coordinates: 47°13′27″N 8°58′50″E
- Elevation: 410 m (1,350 ft)
- Owner: Swiss Federal Railways
- Lines: Rapperswil–Ziegelbrücke; Uznach–Wattwil
- Distance: 34.4 km (21.4 mi) from Wil; 46.5 km (28.9 mi) from Sargans
- Train operators: Südostbahn
- Connections: Tarifverbund Ostwind
- Bus: Schneider bus route 623; PostAuto Schweiz bus routes 521 630 631 632 633 636

Other information
- Fare zone: 992 (Tarifverbund Ostwind)

Passengers
- 2018: 8,600 per weekday

Services
Preceding station	Südostbahn	Following station
Rapperswil towards Lucerne	Voralpen Express	Wattwil towards St. Gallen
Preceding station	St. Gallen S-Bahn	Following station
Rapperswil Terminus	S4	Kaltbrunn towards Sargans
Schmerikon towards Rapperswil	S6	Benken towards Schwanden or Linthal
Schmerikon towards Rapperswil	S17	Benken towards Sargans
Location
- Location within Switzerland Location within Canton of St. Gallen

Uznach railway station (German: Bahnhof Uznach) is a railway station situated in the municipality of Uznach in the Swiss canton of St. Gallen. It is located on the Wallisellen–Uster–Rapperswil railway line, at its junction with the Uznach to Wattwil line.

The station is served by the inter-regional Voralpen Express, which links Lucerne and St. Gallen via Rapperswil and Wattwil. It is also served St. Gallen S-Bahn services S4, S6, and S17.

== Services ==
As of the December 2023 timetable change, the following services stop at Uznach:

- IR Voralpen-Express: hourly service between Lucerne and St. Gallen.
- St. Gallen S-Bahn:
  - S4: hourly service between Rapperswil and Sargans via St. Gallen.
  - S6 / S17: half-hourly service between Rapperswil and Ziegelbrücke and hourly service to Schwanden / Linthal or Sargans.
