= Uznach–Wattwil railway =

Railway line in Switzerland

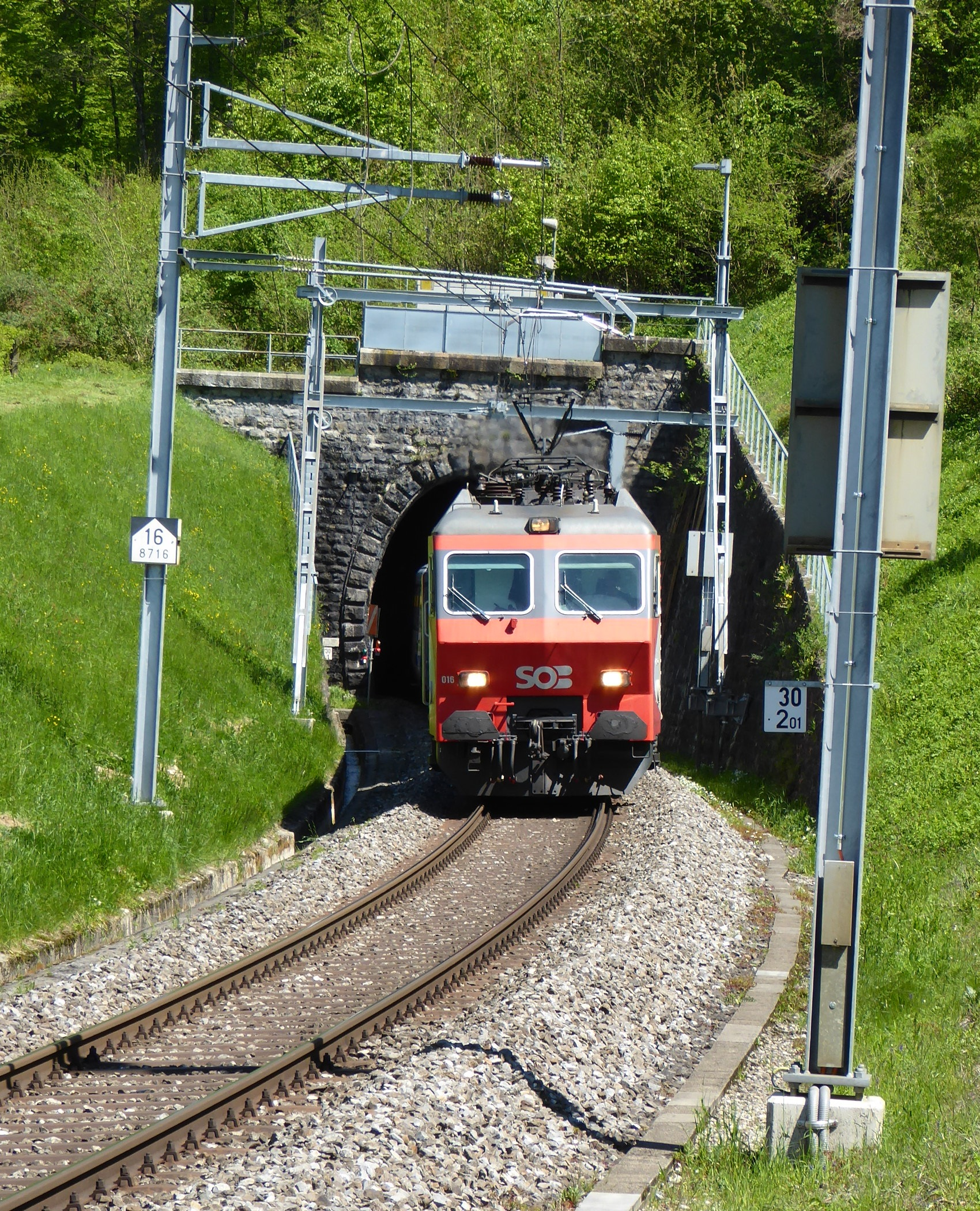
- Südostbahn's (SOB) former Re 446 electric locomotive leaving Ricken Tunnel near Kaltbrunn

Overview
- Owner: Swiss Federal Railways
- Line number: 870
- Termini: Uznach; Wattwil

Technical
- Line length: 14.37 km (8.93 mi)
- Number of tracks: 1
- Track gauge: 1,435 mm (4 ft 8 1/2 in) standard gauge
- Electrification: 15 kV/16.7 Hz AC overhead catenary

The Uznach–Wattwil railway, also called the Rickenbahn (Ricken Railway) is a single-track standard-gauge line in the canton of St. Gallen, Switzerland. It was opened on 1 October 1910 by the Swiss Federal Railways. It is 14.37 kilometres (8.93 mi) long, including 8.603 kilometres (5.346 mi) in the Ricken Tunnel. The relatively short track has only three railway stations.

== History ==
The construction of this line is directly related to the construction of the Bodensee–Toggenburg railway by the Bodensee-Toggenburg-Bahn (BT). Its line included the St. Gallen–Wattwil section of the St. Gallen–Wattwil–Rapperswil project, which was promoted by the engineer "Lusser" and for which a concession was granted on 27 June 1890. As a result of the skilful tactics of the canton of St. Gallen, construction of the line was transferred to the Toggenburgerbahn, the builder of the Wil–Ebnat-Kappel railway. However, it did not have to start construction, as its nationalisation was imminent and it was taken over by the United Swiss Railways (Vereinigte Schweizerbahnen, VSB). As a result, the new Swiss Federal Railways (SBB) was obliged to build the Ricken Railway at its own expense. Construction of the Ricken Tunnel began in January 1904 and the line was put into operation on 1 October 1910. After a railway accident in the Ricken Tunnel on 4 October 1926, in which 9 people died, the immediate electrification of the line was approved. Electric operations at 15 kV AC 16.7 Hz commenced between Rapperswil and Wattwil on 7 May 1927.

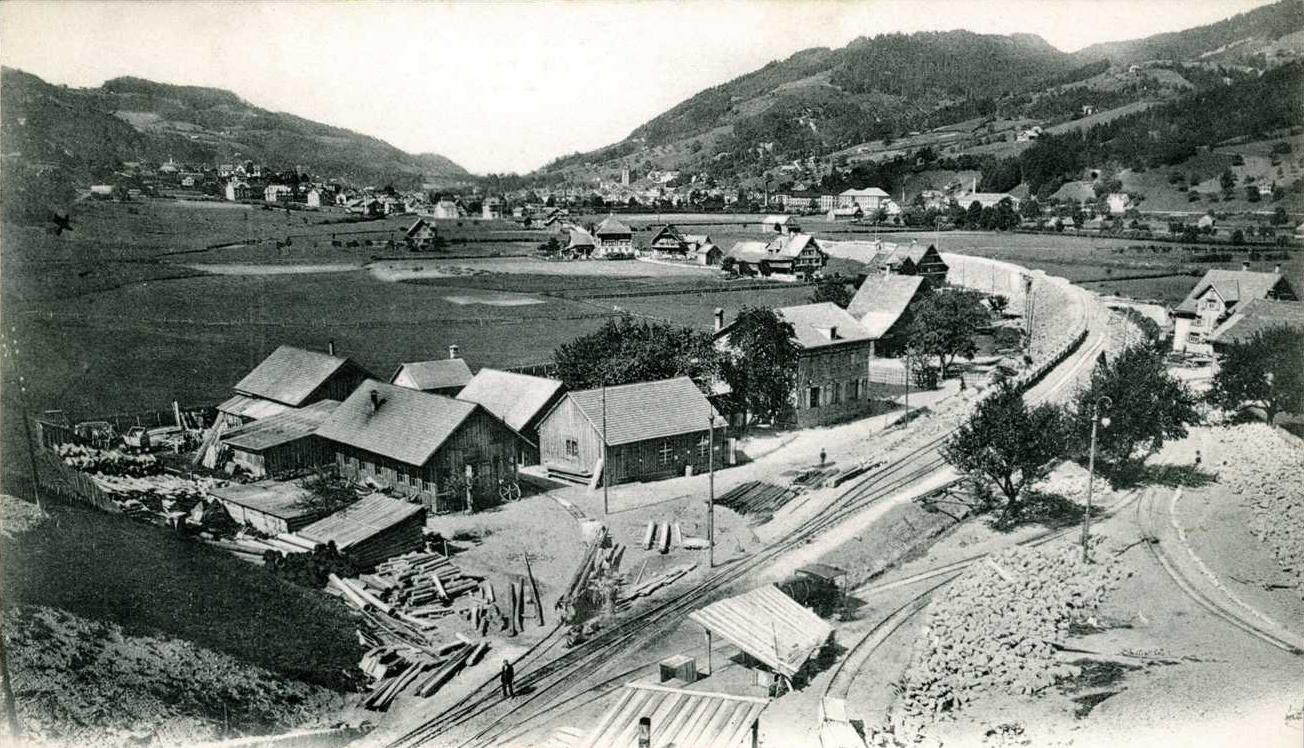
View from the north portal of the Ricken Tunnel towards Wattwil

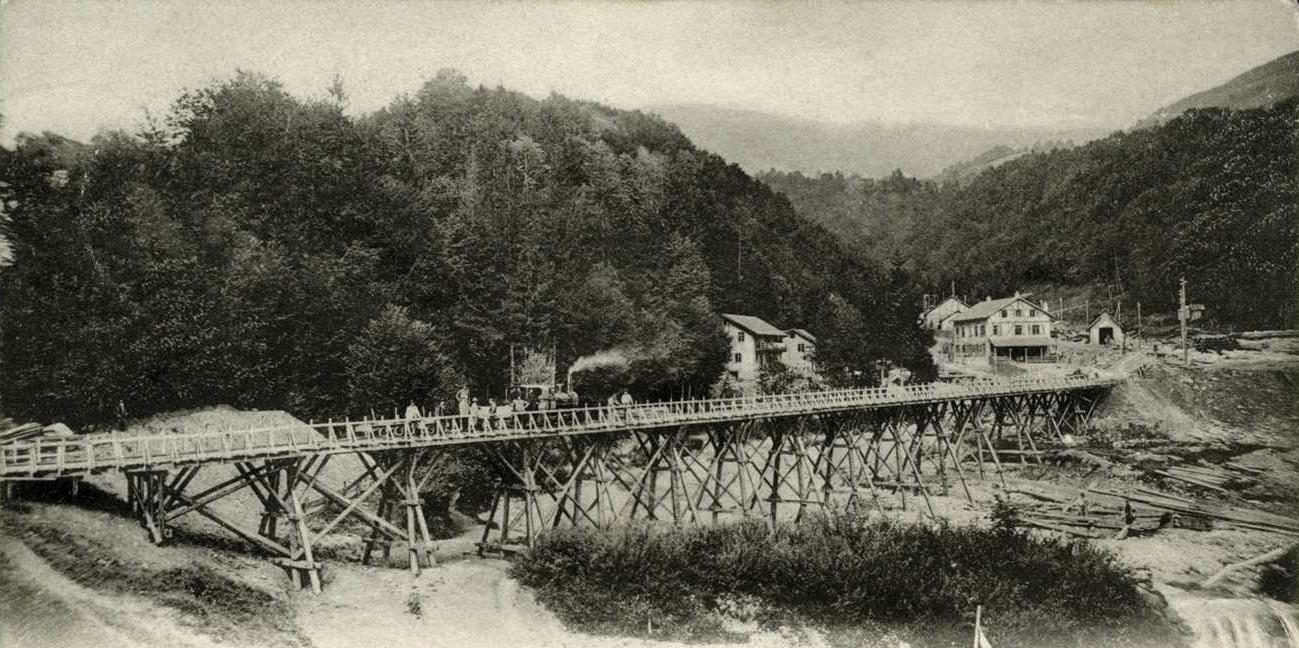
Construction of scaffolding over the river Giegenbach

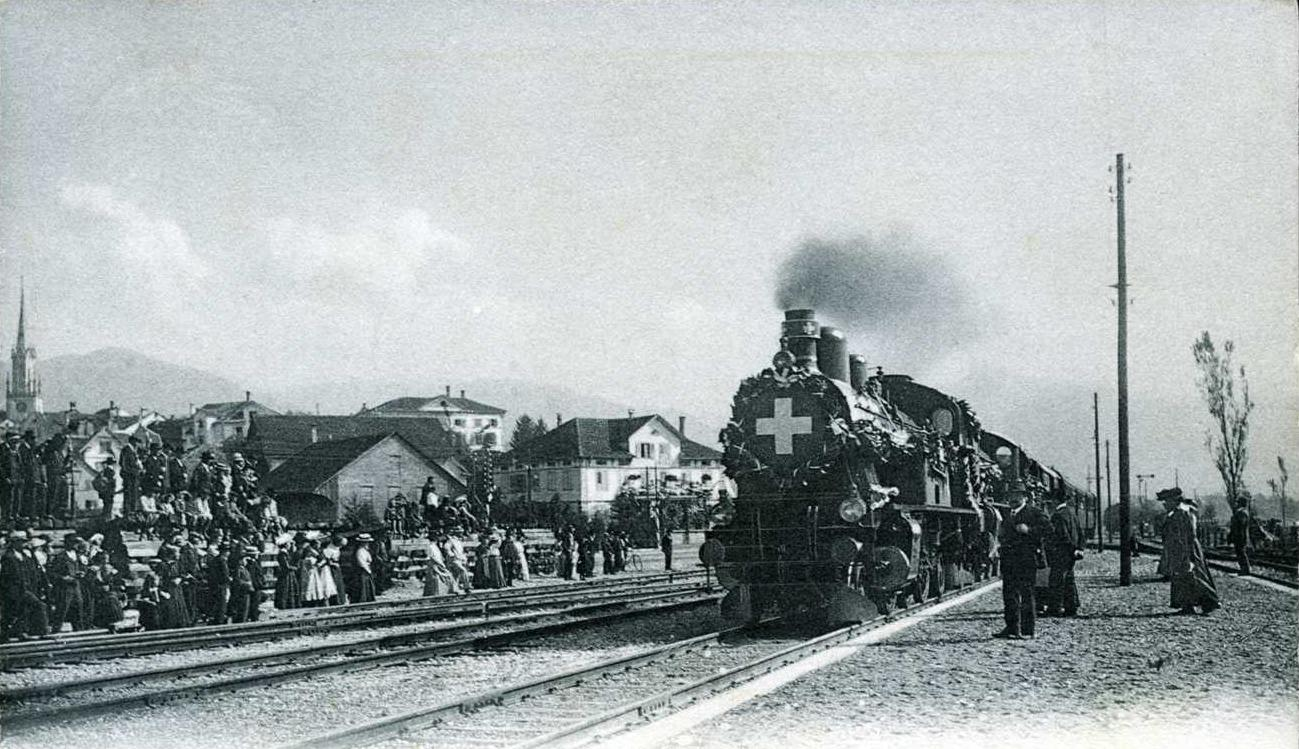
Opening of Uznach station

== Route ==
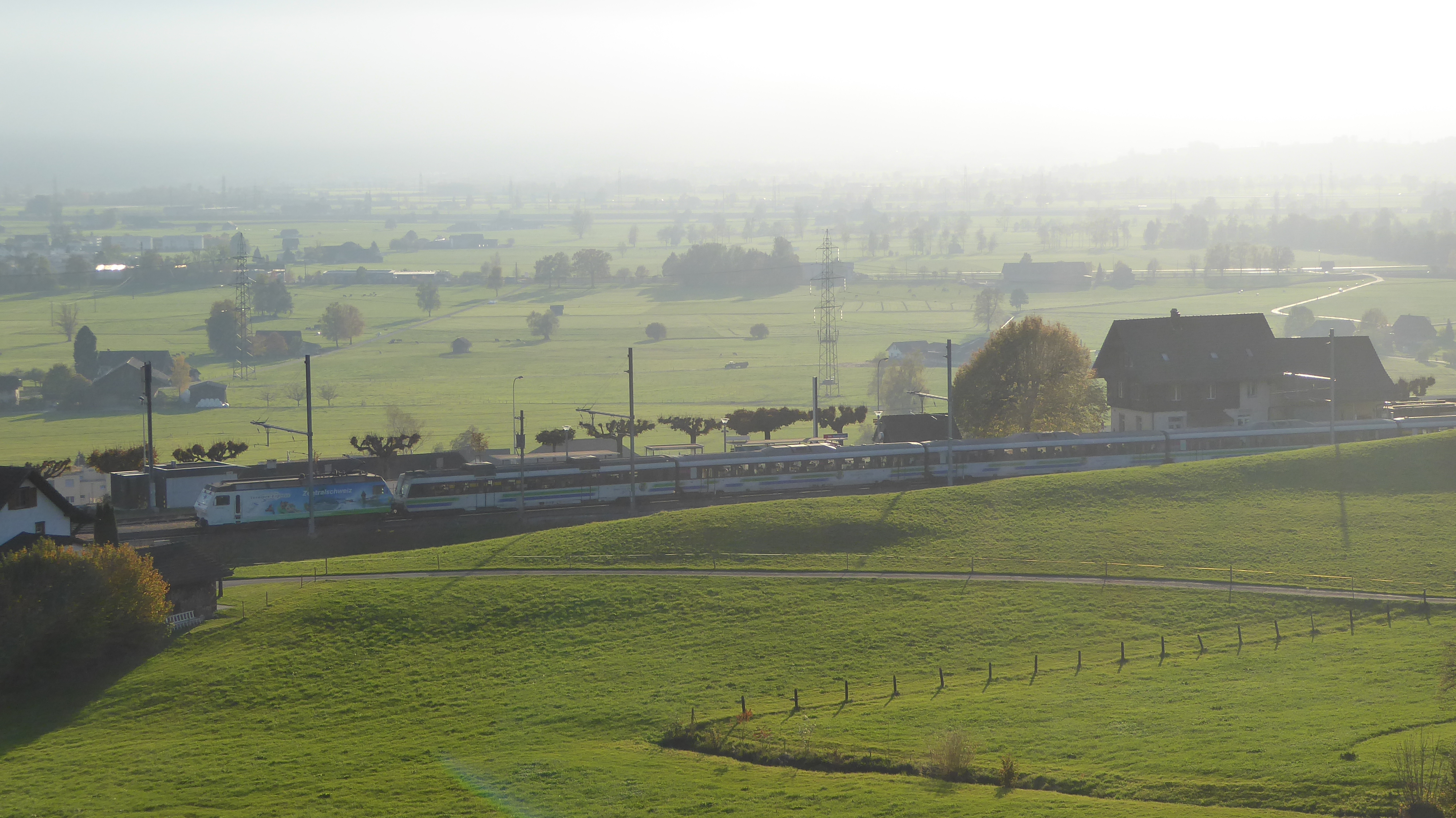
Kaltbrunn station with passing Voralpen-Express (former rolling stock), Linth Plain (Linthebene) behind

The line branches off in Uznach from the Rapperswil–Ziegelbrücke railway, which was opened between Rüti and Glarus by the VSB on 15 February 1856. It then climbs to the east to Kaltbrunn station. After that, it continues to ascend to the northeast to the south portal of the Ricken Tunnel. This tunnel is laid out in a straight line with an even gradient of 1.575%. From the north portal, the line drops to Wattwil station. There is connection to the Wil–Ebnat-Kappel railway, which was opened on 14 June 1870 and to the Bodensee–Toggenburg railway to St. Gallen, which was opened on 3 October 1910. The only major structure that had to be built was the 8603 metre-long Ricken Tunnel. The track was built with one track and has remained unchanged to this day. A passing loop is present at Kaltbrunn.

=== Services ===
The line is used by the Voralpen-Express, an InterRegio (IR) service between Lucerne and St. Gallen, and the S4 service of the St. Gallen S-Bahn. Both are operated by the Südostbahn (SOB). The line is only rarely used by freight trains.
