= Voralpen Express =

Named passenger service in Switzerland

Voralpen-Express
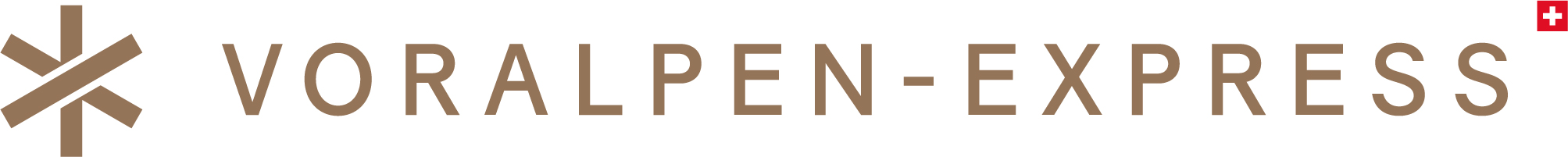

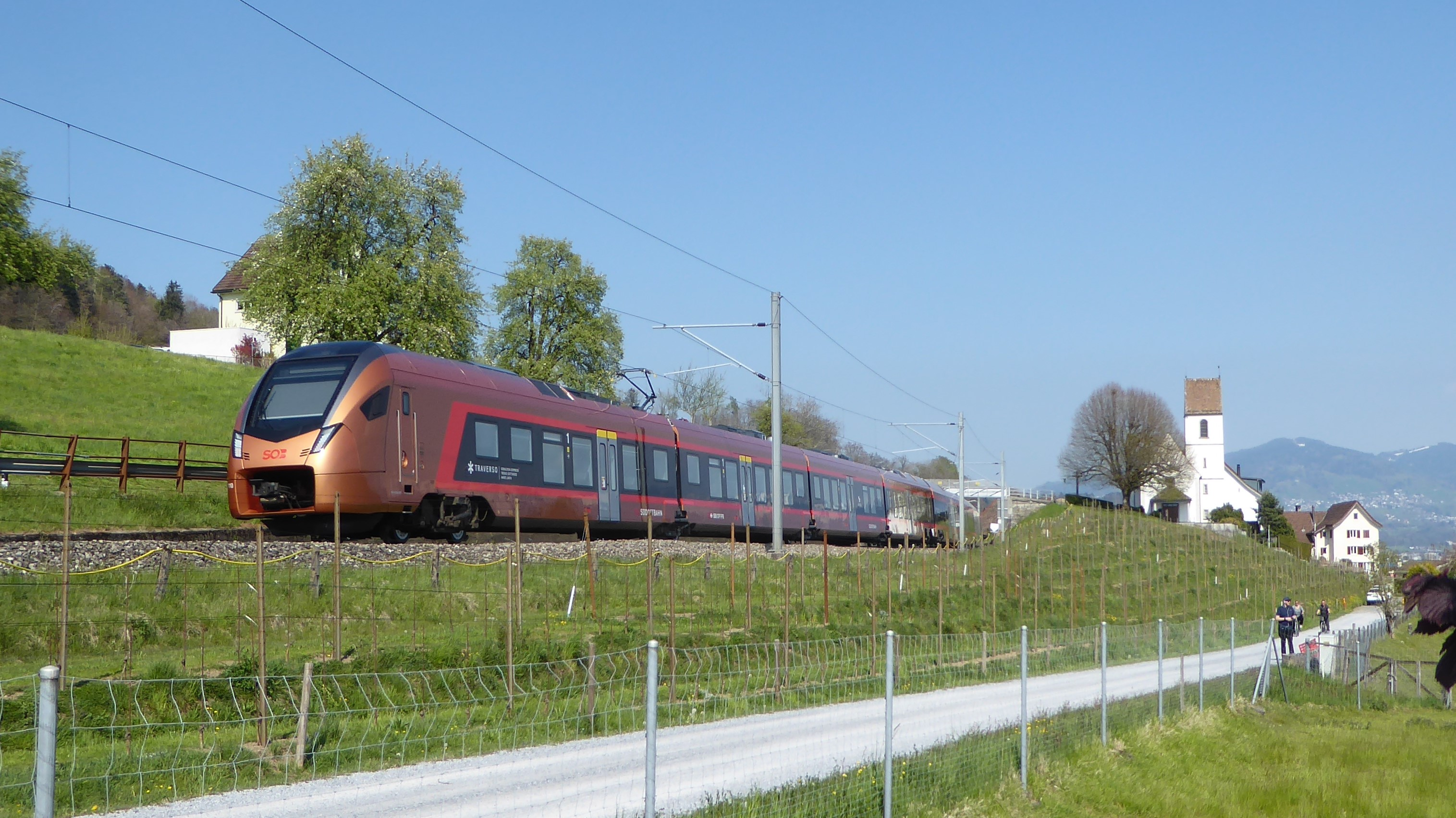
- Stadler 'Traverso' EMU, operating as Voralpen-Express since 2019, passing through Bollingen

Overview
- Service type: InterRegio
- First service: 1992
- Current operators: SOB (since December 2013)
- Former operators: SBB, SOB (until December 2013)

Route
- Termini: St. Gallen, SG; Luzern, LU
- Stops: 12 (see route map)
- Distance travelled: 125 kilometres (78 mi)
- Average journey time: 2 hours 16 minutes
- Service frequency: every hour
- Train number: 2402–2442

On-board services
- Classes: 1st and 2nd Class
- Disabled access: yes
- Seating arrangements: 1st Class carriage with panorama view (until 2019). Second class coach seating
- Catering facilities: Vending machines
- Other facilities: Family area (Familienabteil) at one end of the train

Technical
- Rolling stock: see article
- Track gauge: 1,435 mm (4 ft 8 1/2 in)
- Electrification: 15 kV 16,7 Hz AC Overhead
- Timetable number: 600; 670; 870;

The Voralpen-Express (VAE) is a named train connecting small to medium-sized cities and villages in Central and Eastern Switzerland on a scenic route, carrying this name since 1992. It is operated by Südostbahn (SOB) and runs every hour as an InterRegio (IR) between St. Gallen and Lucerne, bypassing Zurich. Its name derives from the fact that it traverses the Prealps (German: Voralpen).

== History ==
The first through trains between Romanshorn (Lake Constance) and Arth-Goldau started in 1940 after the electrification of the Südostbahn line between Rapperswil and Arth-Goldau. Romanshorn–Rapperswil had been under wires since 1926/31. The trains, fir green MUs composed of CFZe 4/4 and BCFZe 4/4 (both later called ABe 4/4) motor coaches and coaches, were jointly operated by Bodensee–Toggenburg-Bahn (BT), Südostbahn (SOB), and the Swiss Federal Railways (SBB CFF FFS). In 1944, BT added buffet cars to the trainsets. In 1947, some trains continued from Arth-Goldau to Lucerne. In 1960, operation was changed to push-pull configuration with very powerful motor coaches (BDe 4/4). The trainsets were at this time painted in green and cream.

1982 brought the clock-face timetable with a train Romanshorn–Lucerne every two hours, but also the end for buffet cars on this route. In 1991, BT and SOB bought inter-city coaches, model EW IV (Einheitswagen IV, Swiss standard coaches IV), to replace the push-pull sets. The name Voralpen-Express appeared for the first time in railway guides in 1992. In 1995, additional, unnamed trains every two hours operated between Romanshorn and Arth-Goldau, again with push-pull sets. After Revvivo coaches had been used for these trains from 1997 on, it was decided to sell the EW IV to Swiss Federal Railways and buy more Revvivos to allow an hourly push-pull trainset between Romanshorn and Lucerne. In 2001, BT and SOB merged into the new SOB, which reduced the number of participating companies to two. VAE ran as an InterRegio (IR) express train until 2013.

The concept changed on 15 December 2013. SOB became the sole operator of Voralpen-Express, and the train service was limited to St. Gallen–Lucerne. VAE became a distinct train category, indicated as such on platform displays. To cope with the increasing number of passengers, trains at that time generally had seven coaches, which means that two locomotives or motor coaches were needed. This is due to the 50‰ (1:20) grades between Pfäffikon and Arth-Goldau. Motive power was at each end, allowing a push-pull service without driving trailers.

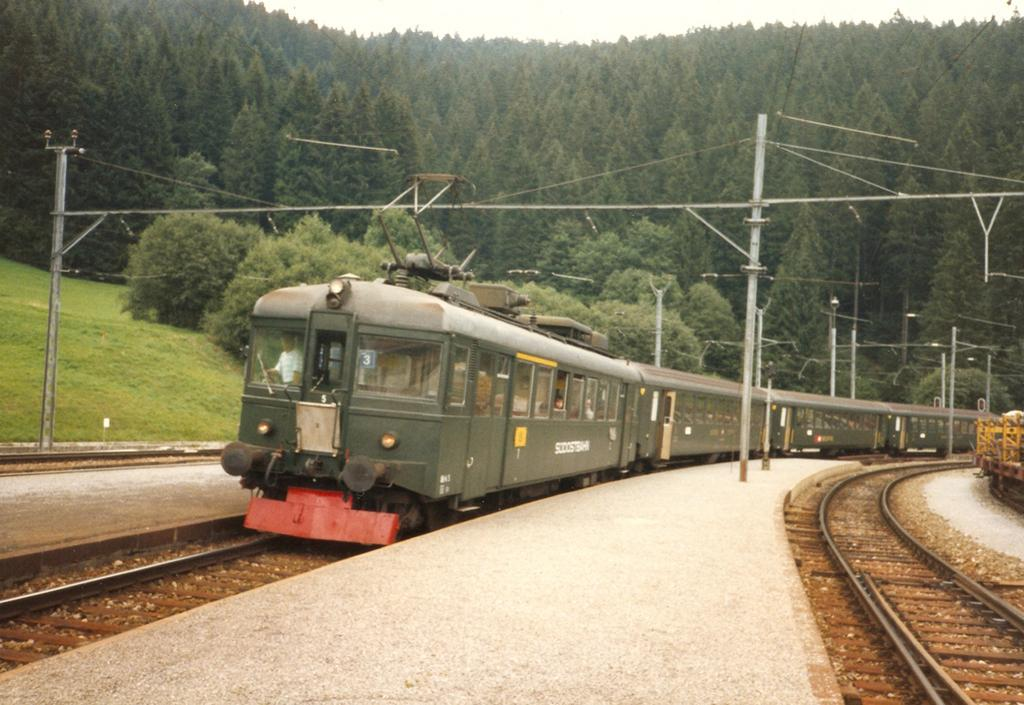
ABe 4/4 (formerly CFZe 4/4) motor coach with coaches at Biberbrugg station

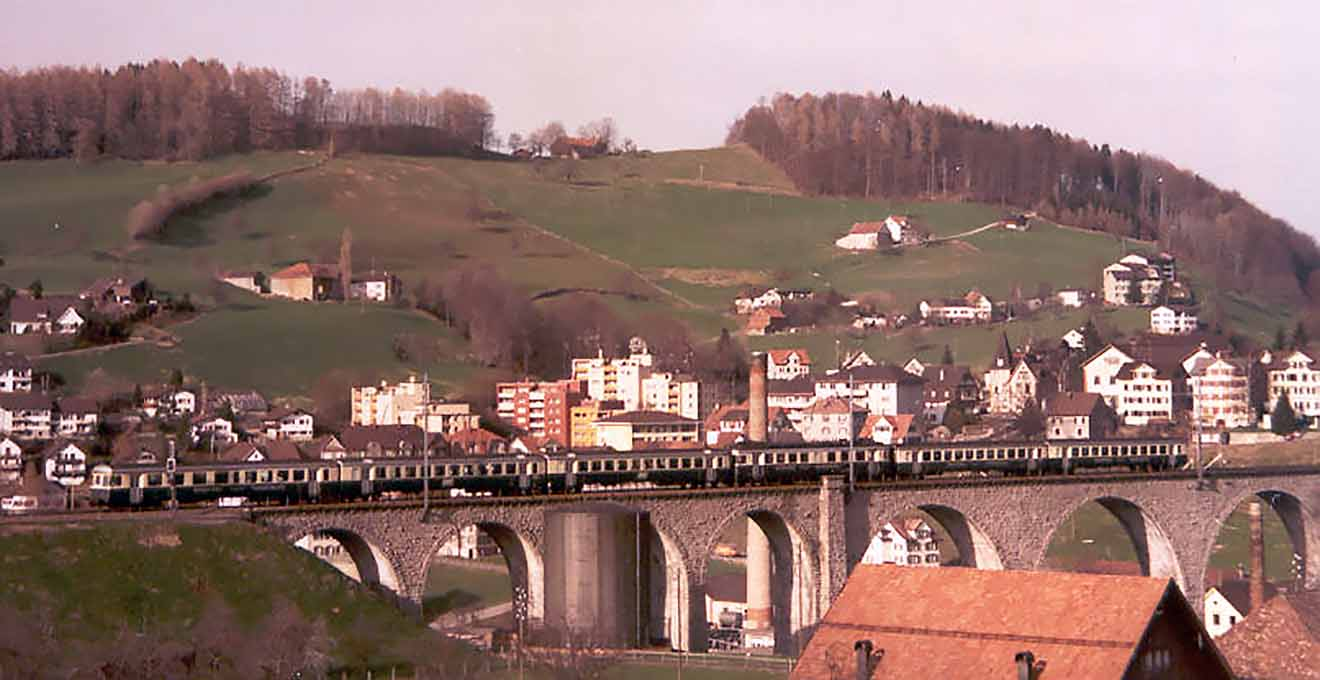
Push-pull set with motor coach in green and cream livery on the Glatttal viaduct (Herisau)

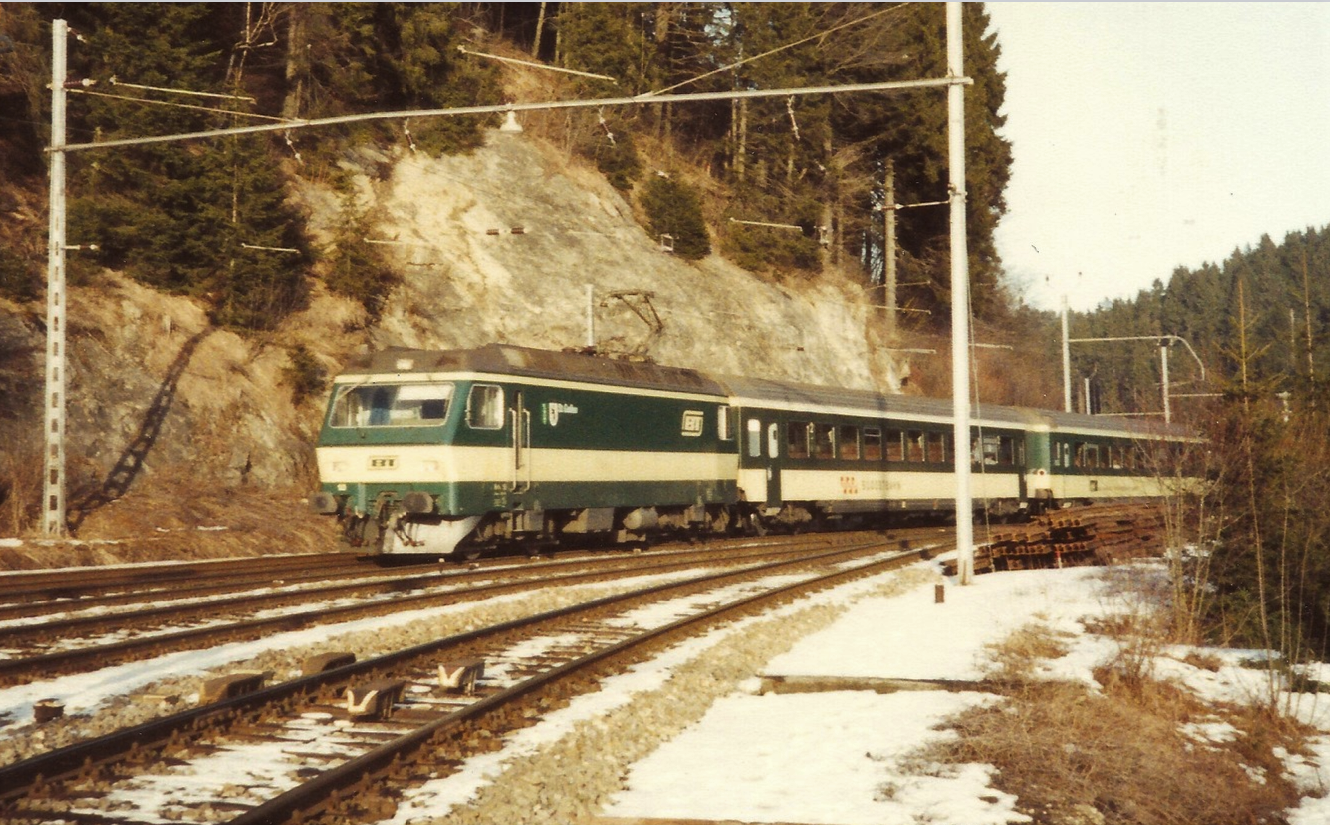
SLM Re 456 locomotive of BT (in green and cream livery) with SOB EW IV coaches near Biberbrugg

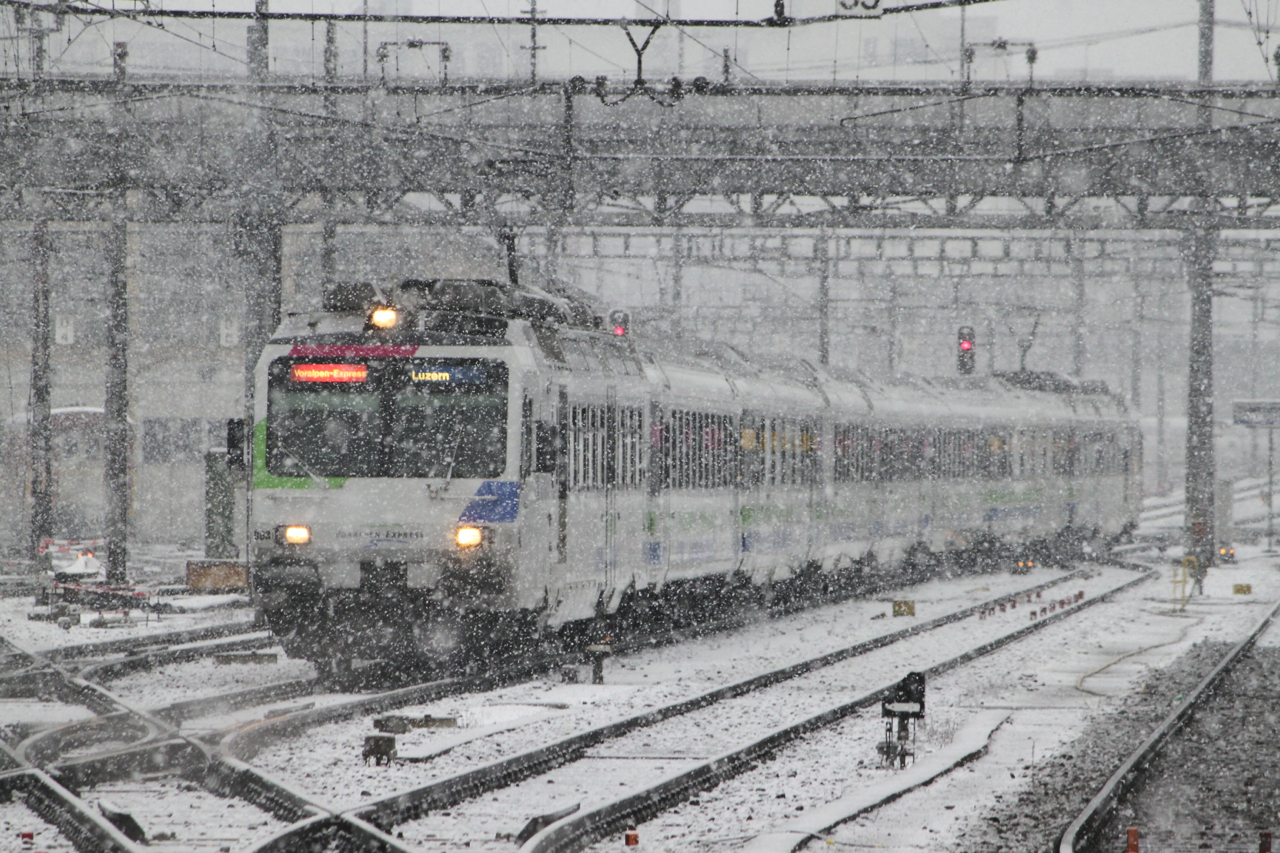
Push-pull set composed of two motor coaches (head and tail) and Revvivo coaches arriving in Rapperswil

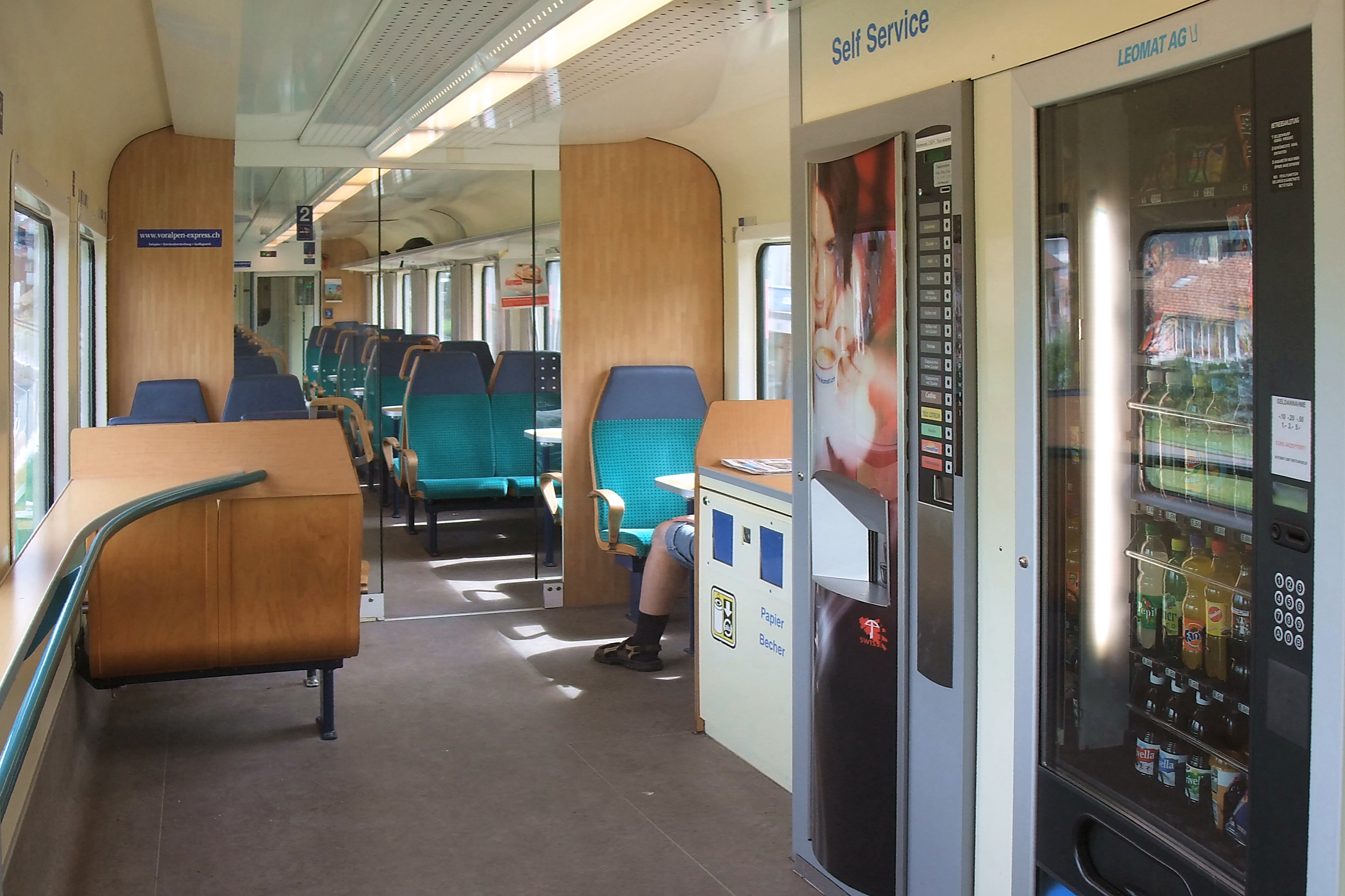
Vending machines inside of a now out of service second class Revvivo coach

With the timetable change of 15 December 2019, the train category was updated to Panorama Express (PE), but because it caused confusion among passengers it was later changed again to IR Voralpen-Express. The locomotive hauled trains (with white, green and blue livery) were replaced by RABe 526 EMUs. The EMUs consist of an eight car RABe 526 100/200 set, type Traverso, with a copper and red livery (with black window frames and grey doors), running the whole route. This set includes a "bistro" car fitted with vending machines in the second class coach bordering the first class coaches. During peak-hours, the copper-red sets are each combined with a silver-red four car RABe 526 000 set (FLIRT or FLIRT3 model) on the section between Rapperswil and St. Gallen. The two sets are coupled and uncoupled, respectively, in Rapperswil (portion working). The shorter set operates as S40 of Zurich S-Bahn between Rapperswil and Einsiedeln. This allows passengers to travel between St. Gallen and Einsiedeln without changing trains.

The same EMUs also operate as Treno Gottardo between Locarno and Zurich/Basel since December 2020, and as Aare Linth between Chur and Bern since December 2021.

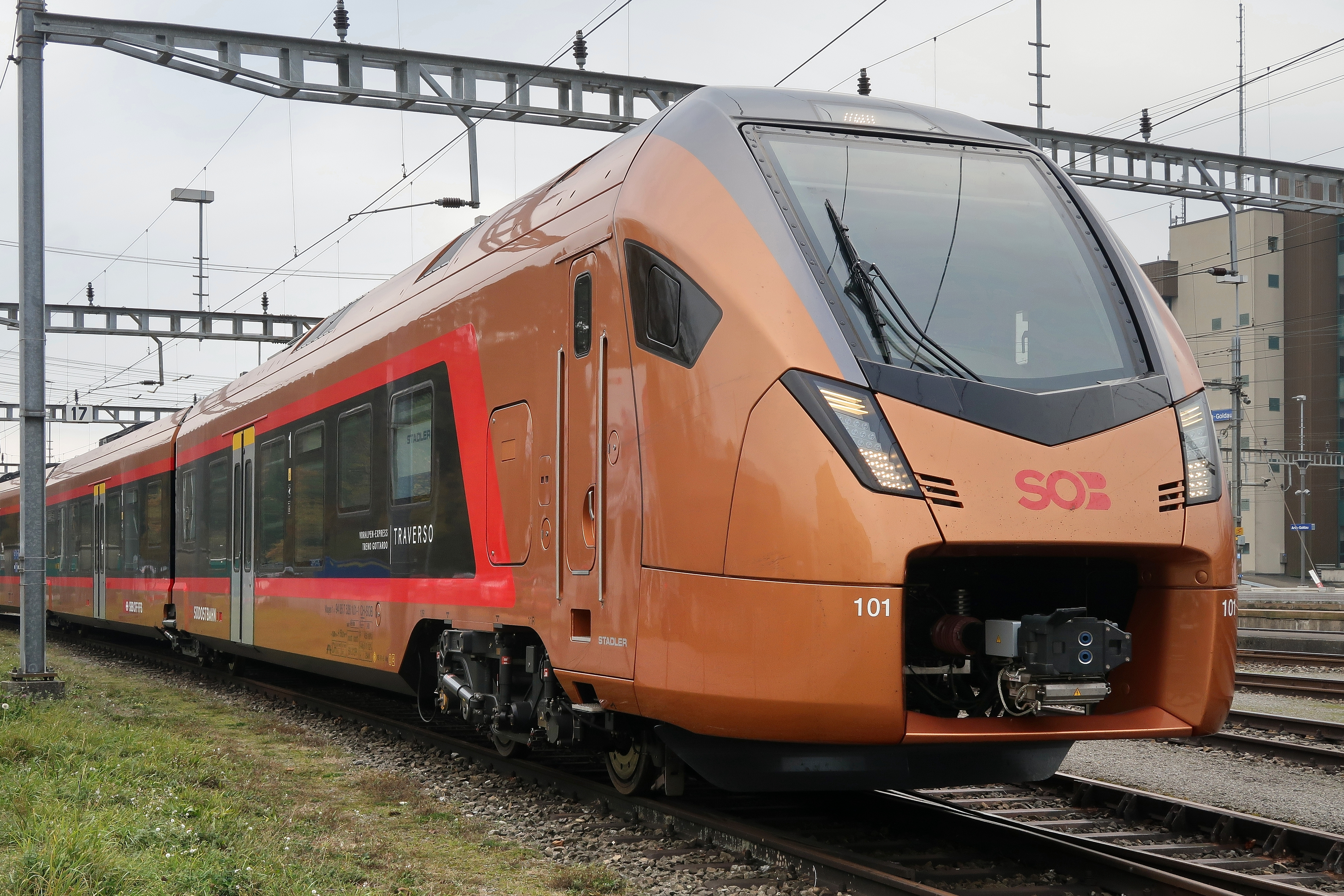
Since 2019, Stadler FLIRT3 trains ("Traverso") operate as InterRegio Voralpen Express between Lucerne and St. Gallen

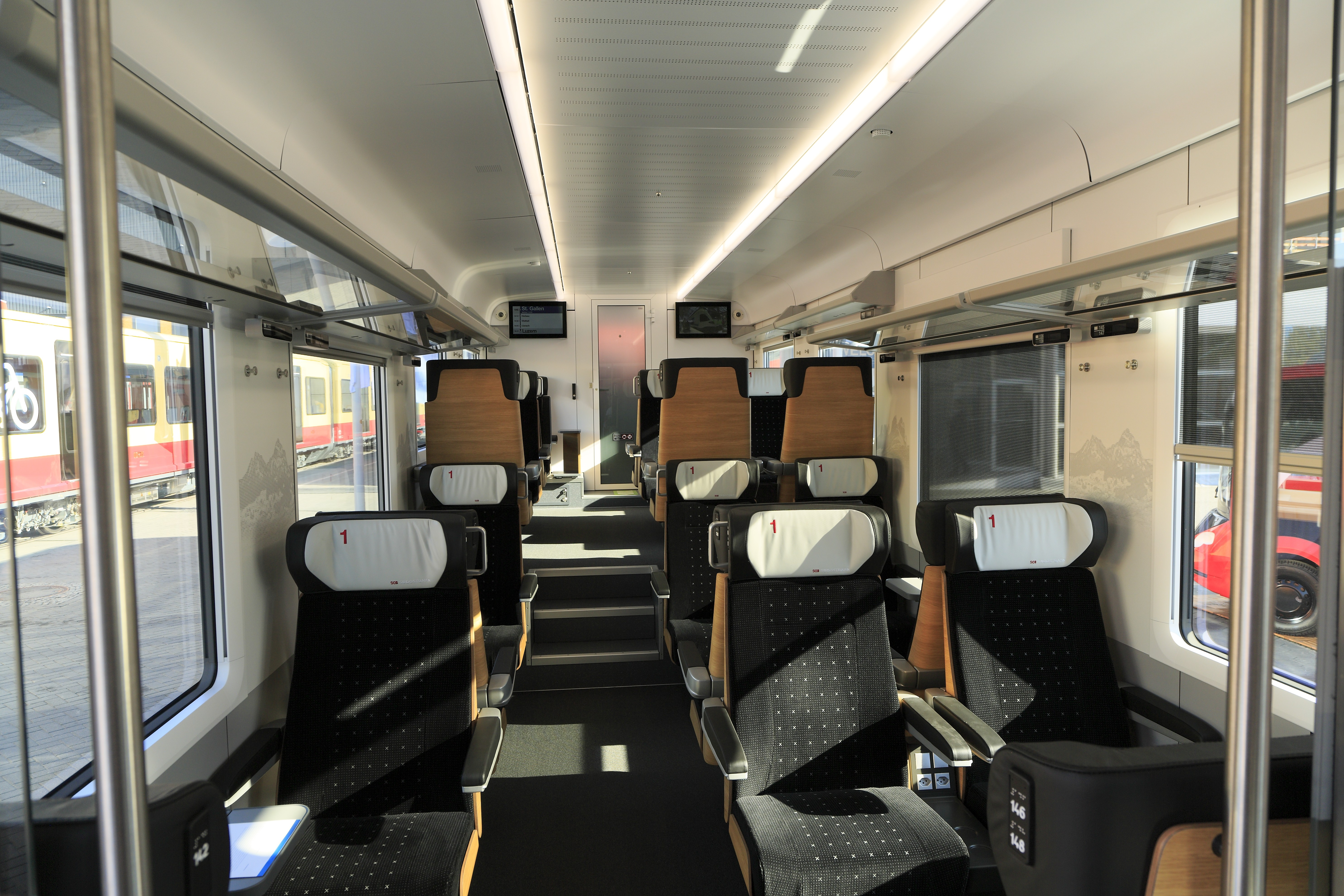
View of the first class interior of Stadler FLIRT3 "Traverso"

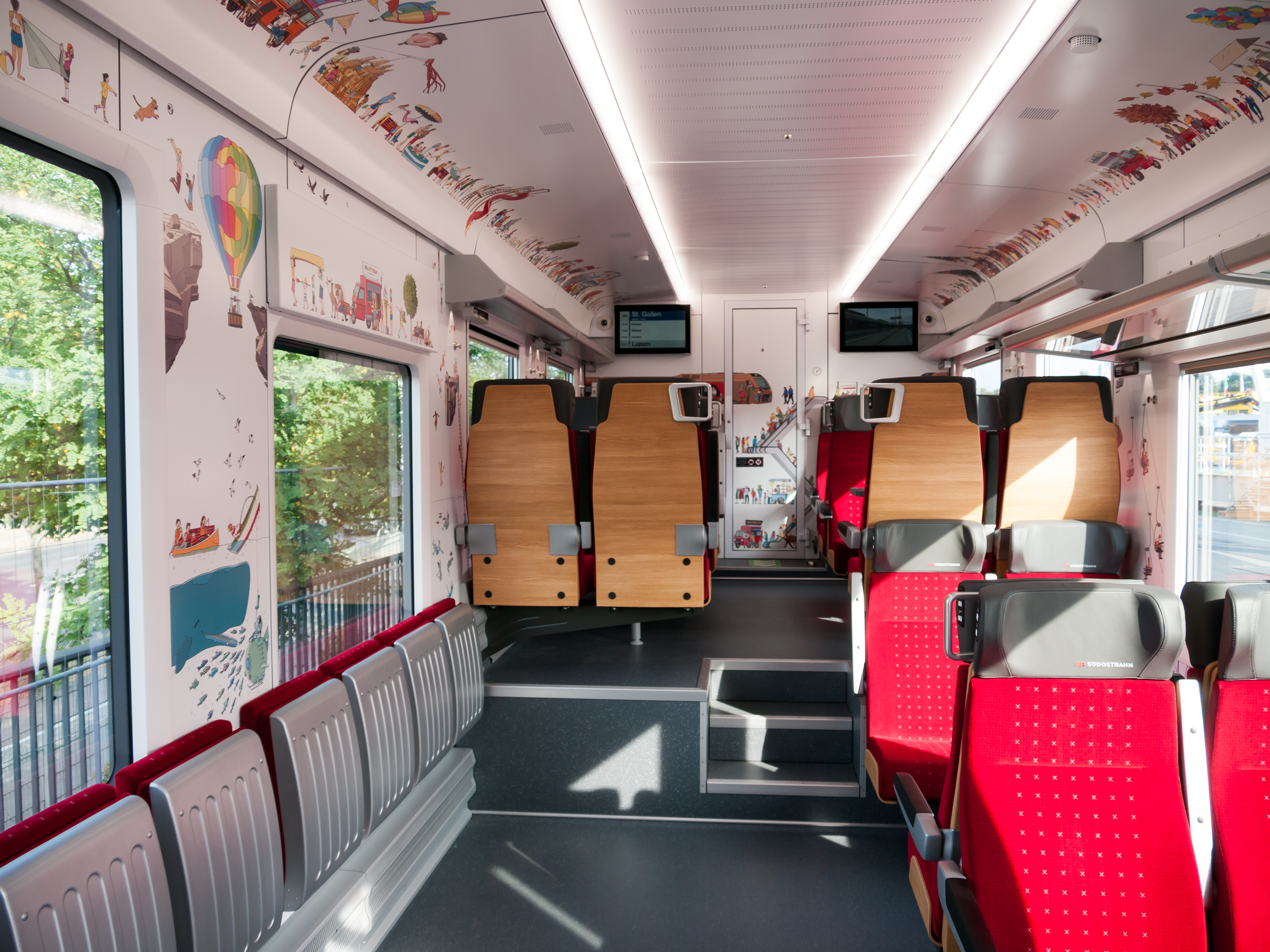
View of the second class (family compartment) interior of Stadler FLIRT3 "Traverso"

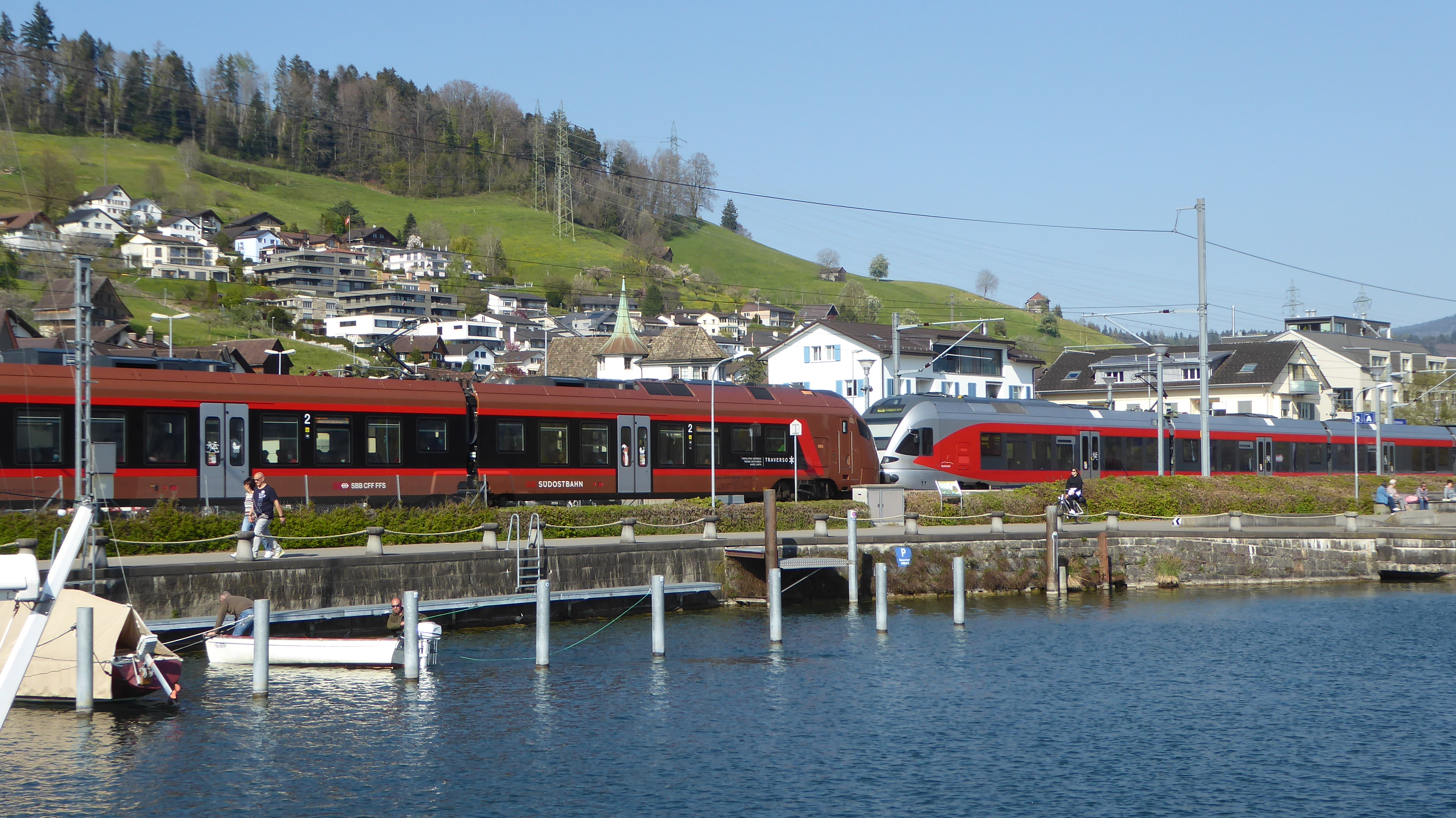
Stadler FLIRT3 "Traverso" eight car set (left) coupled with a four car set (FLIRT, right) at Schmerikon railway station

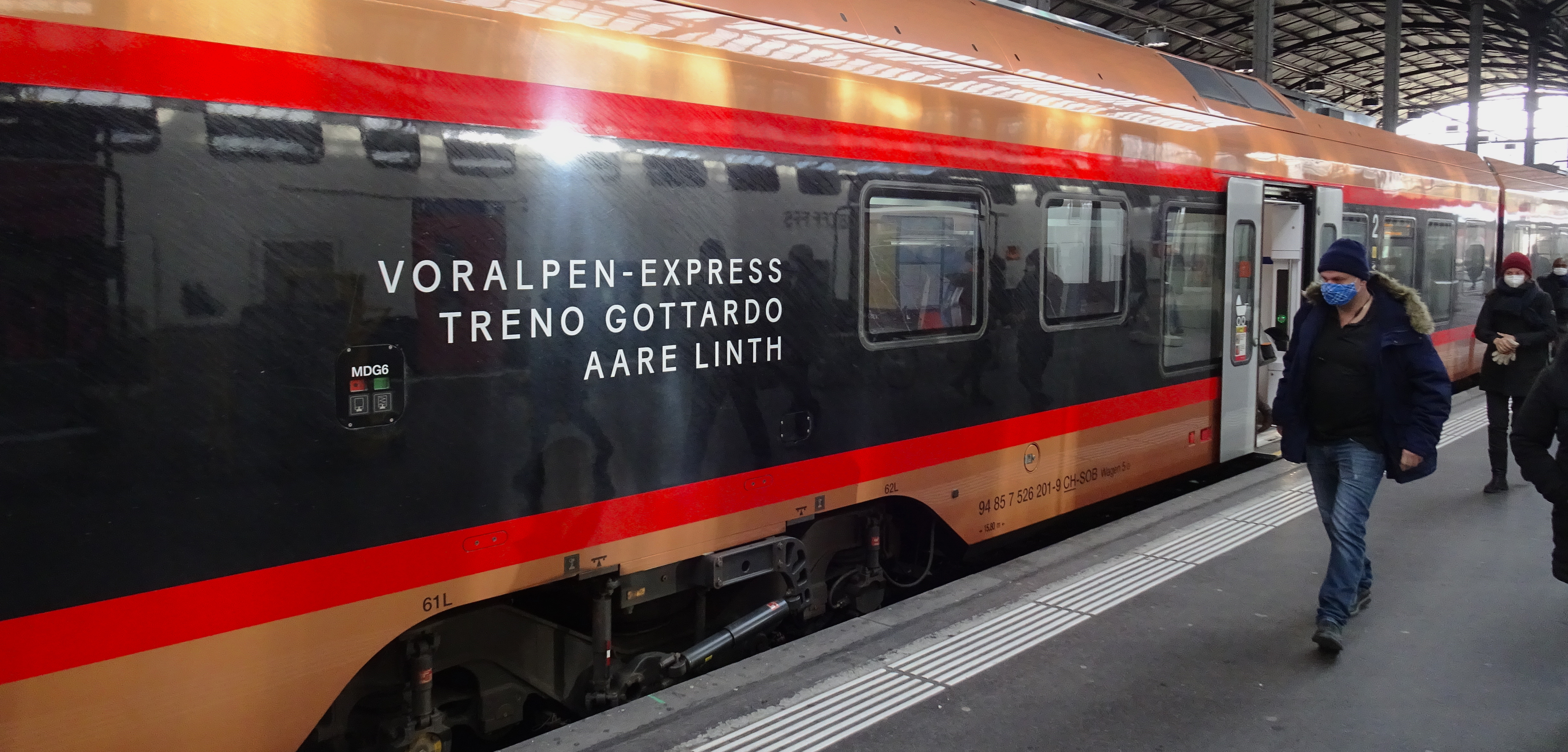
Stadler FLIRT3 "Traverso" also operates as Treno Gottardo and Aare Linth named trains

== Route ==
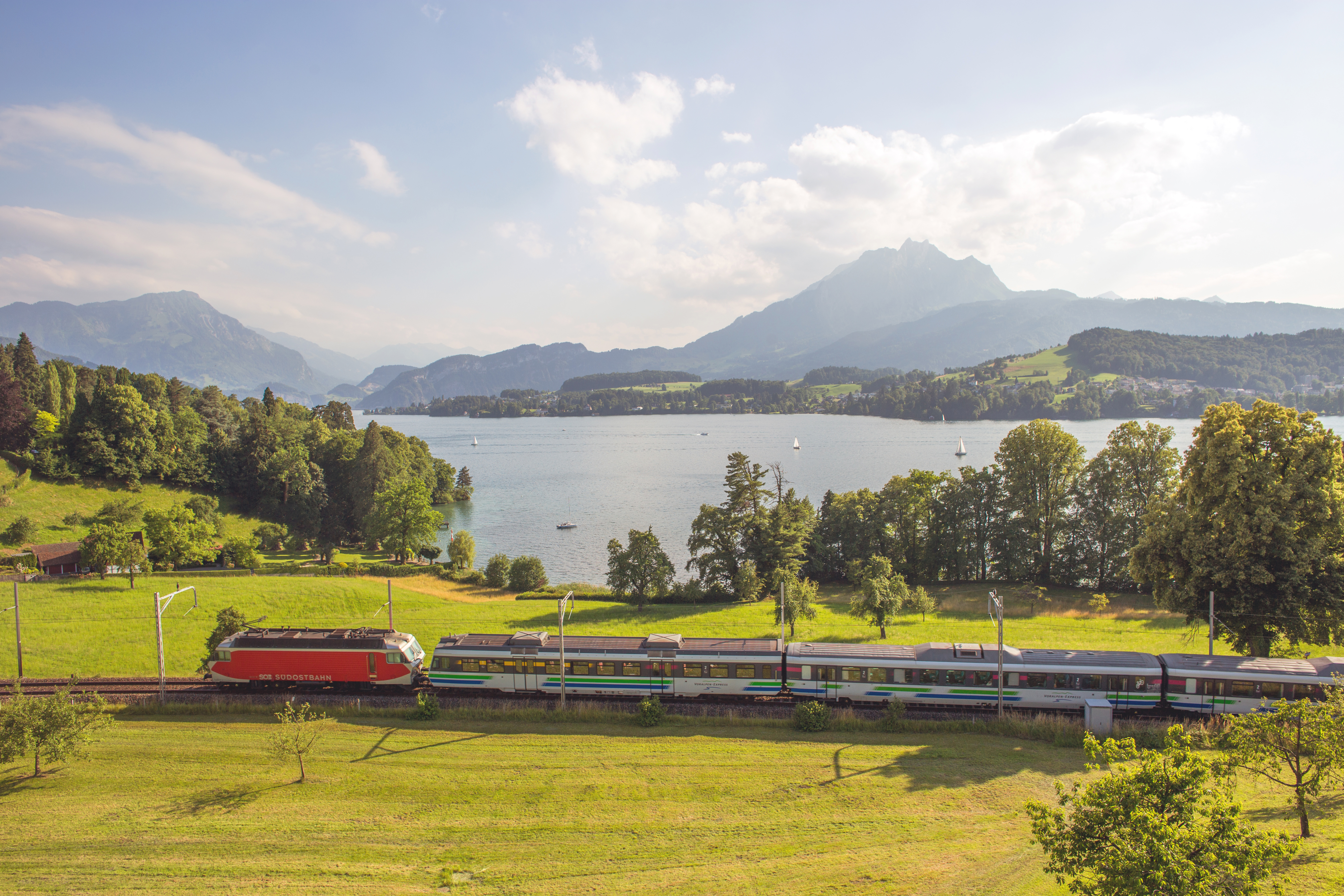
Re 446 locomotive with NPZ control trailer (used here as intermediate trailer) and Revvivo coaches driving along Lake Lucerne (Pilatus mountain in the background)

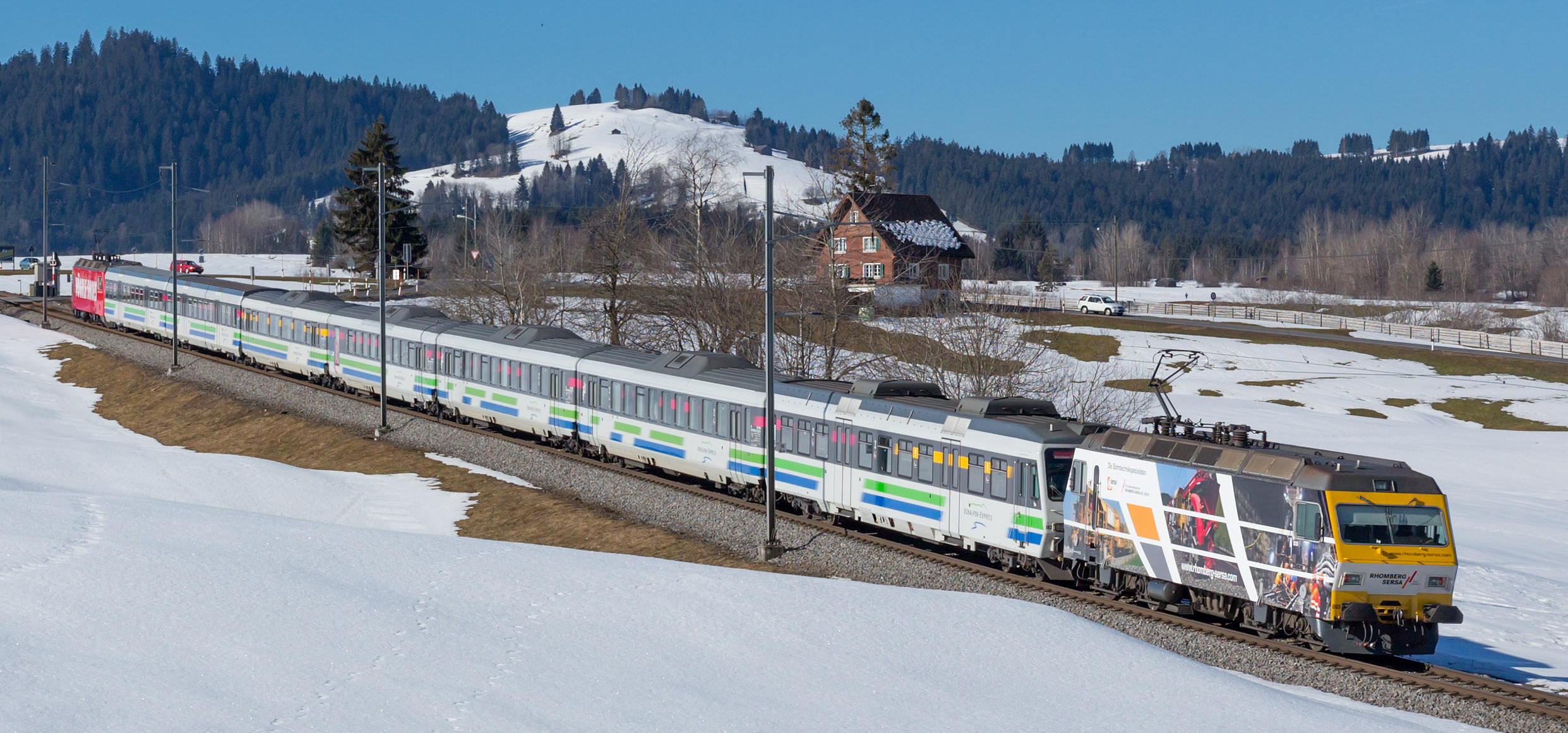
Historic Voralpen-Express set with two Re 456 locomotives (head and tail), pulling out of Biberbrugg towards Rothenthurm

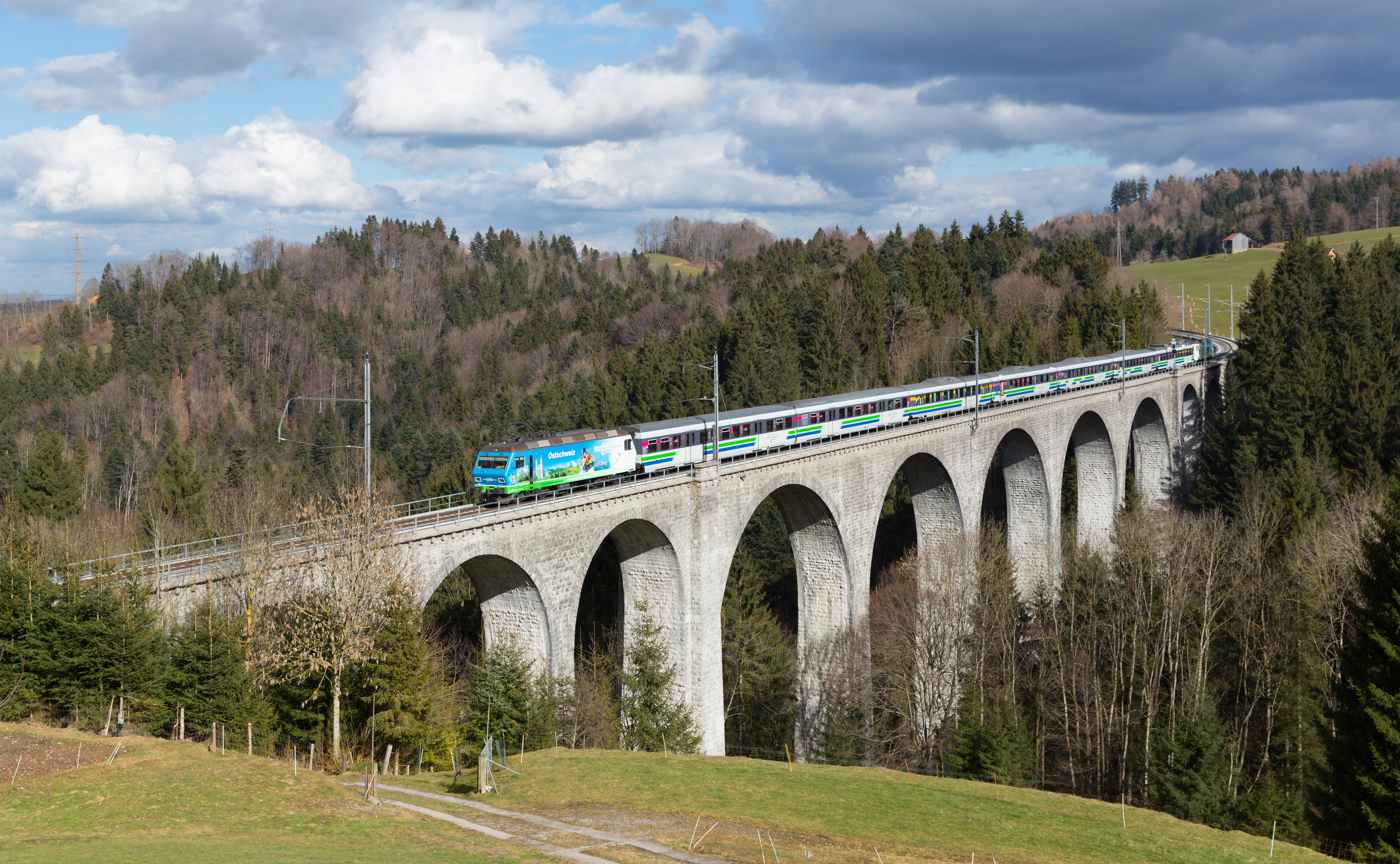
Re 456 (head and tail) and Revvivo coaches passing over Wissbach Viaduct

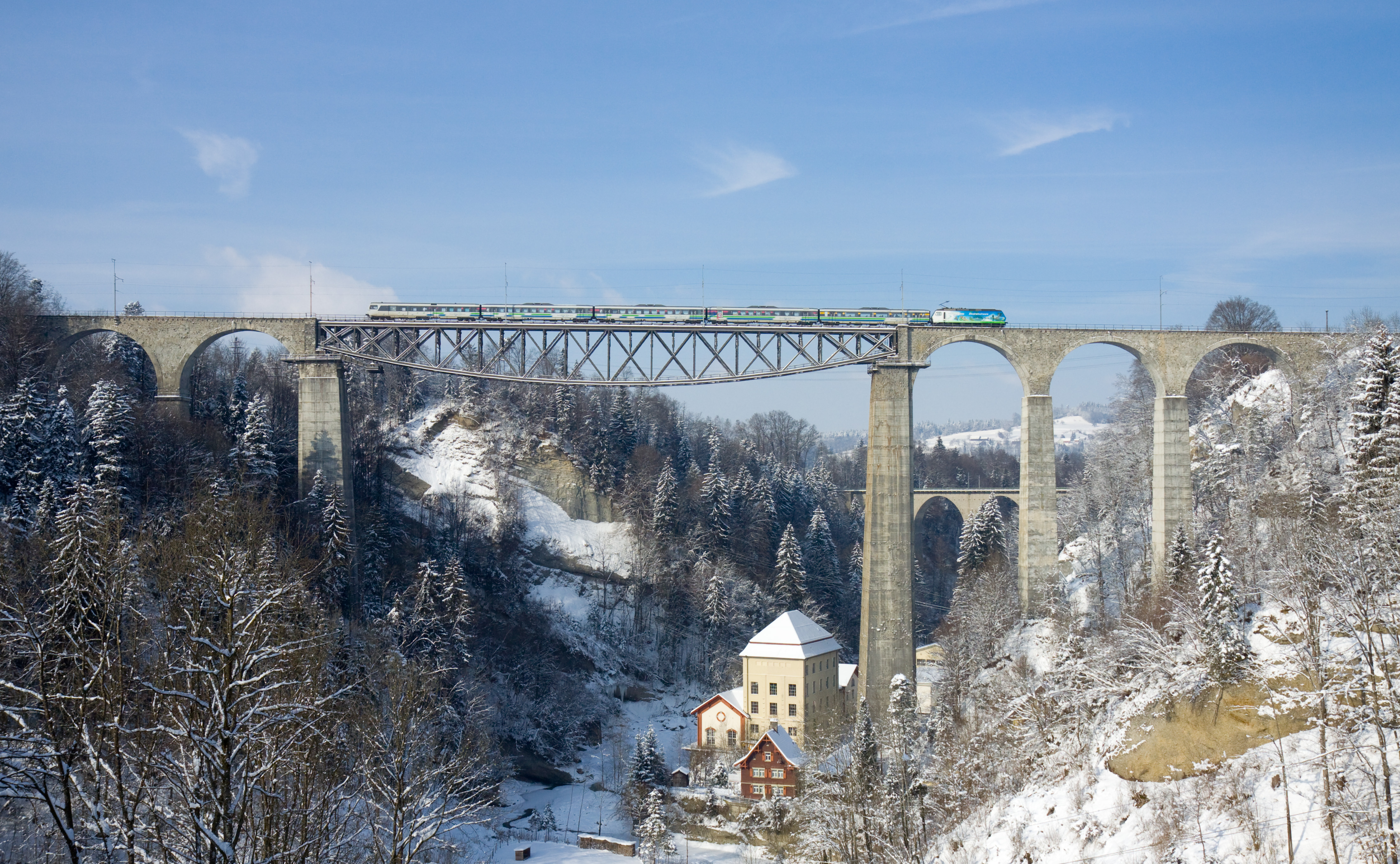
The Sitter Viaduct (SOB) between Herisau and St. Gallen. A second railway bridge, the Sitter Viaduct (SBB) on the Zurich-St. Gallen line, is visible in the background

The Voralpen-Express runs along the Alpine foothills, stopping at stations in the Cantons of Lucerne, Schwyz, St. Gallen, and Appenzell Ausserrhoden. The track also passes through Samstagern in the Canton of Zurich, but VAE does not stop at that station. In conjunction with timetable changes, VAE services were suspended to some stations, including the cessation of services between St. Gallen and Romanshorn in 2013, while a few new stops en route were also added (e.g., Meggen Zentrum). The lowest altitude en route is at Schmerikon (408 metres (1,339 ft) a.s.l.) and the highest at Biberegg (933 metres (3,061 ft) a.s.l.), near Rothenthurm. The route is mostly a single-track railway, with intermittent double-track railway present in sections where trains cross regularly.

From St. Gallen to Lucerne, the Voralpen-Express uses the following railway lines (or sections thereof): Bodensee–Toggenburg, Uznach–Wattwil, Rapperswil–Ziegelbrücke, Rapperswil–Pfäffikon, Pfäffikon–Arth-Goldau, Gotthard and Lucerne–Immensee.

Besides creating a tangential link on the southern edge of the greater Zurich area, VAE is popular for the alpine and prealpine scenery.

=== Connections and tourism ===
Several stations en route of Voralpen-Express are important junctions, offering timely connections due to the synchronized Swiss timetable. The trains are used by commuters (especially during rush hour) and tourists alike. The most important stations with connecting trains/busses, regular boat lines on the lakes, and nearby tourist destinations are:

- Luzern: trains of Lucerne S-Bahn, GoldenPass Line, boat lines of Lake Lucerne (Vierwaldstättersee), Pilatus mountain
- Luzern Verkehrshaus station is situated next to the Swiss Museum of Transport (Verkehrshaus der Schweiz)
- Arth-Goldau: trains through the Gotthard Rail Tunnel/Gotthard Base Tunnel to Ticino and Italy, trains to Zug (Zug Stadtbahn) and Zurich HB, cog-wheel train to Rigi mountain (Arth–Rigi railway line), Lake Zug boat lines departing from Arth, Zoo near Goldau.
- Biberbrugg: trains to Einsiedeln (Einsiedeln Abbey) and Wädenswil
- Pfäffikon: trains to Sargans (connecting bus service to Liechtenstein) and Chur (narrow gauge network of Rhätische Bahn to other destinations in Canton Grisons), lines of Zurich S-Bahn and InterRegios to Zurich HB
- Rapperswil: trains to Zurich (Zurich S-Bahn), Lake Zurich boat lines, medieval town and castle, Knie's Kinderzoo
- Uznach: trains to Ziegelbrücke (Walensee) and Schwanden (Glarus Alps)
- Wattwil: trains and busses to destinations in Toggenburg and Churfirsten
- Herisau: trains to Appenzell (Wasserauen/Alpstein) and Gossau (narrow gauge network of Appenzeller Bahnen)
- St. Gallen: trains of St. Gallen S-Bahn, InterCity/EuroCity trains to Zurich HB, Austria, and Germany, St. Gallen Abbey and Abbey Library (both UNESCO World Heritage Sites)

=== Civil engineering works and scenery ===
On its journey, the Voralpen-Express passes over a series of viaducts and through several tunnels. The mountainous route also parallels scenic lakes and moors. Here are some noteworthy examples:

- Lake Lucerne (Vierwaldstättersee), between Lucerne and Küssnacht am Rigi
- Lake Zug (Zugersee), between Küssnacht a. R. and Arth-Goldau
- Rothenthurm raised bog (Rothenthurmer Hochmoor) and Finnenloipe Rothenthurm, a 20 kilometres (12 mi) long cross-country skiing trail
- Seedamm, a mostly natural dam (ice age moraine) between Pfäffikon and Rapperswil separating Lake Zurich (Zürichsee) into an upper and lower lake, and Ufenau and Lützelau islands
- Ricken Tunnel, a 8.6 kilometres (5.3 mi) long tunnel with 15,75‰ grades (built between 1904 and 1910) that connects the Linth plain with Toggenburg
- Wasserfluh Tunnel, a 3.5 kilometres (2.2 mi) long tunnel between the villages of Lichtensteig and Brunnadern with 10,4‰ grades (built between 1905 and 1910)
- Wissbach Viaduct, a 289.5 metres (950 ft) long and 63 metres (207 ft) high stone arch bridge near Degersheim
- Glatttal Viaduct, a 296 metres (971 ft) long and up to 34 metres (112 ft) high viaduct near Herisau railway station
- Sitter Viaduct (SOB), a 365 metres (1,198 ft) long and 99 metres (325 ft) high bridge (the highest railroad bridge in Switzerland) over the Sitter river near St. Gallen (built between 1908 and 1910)

Travelling with the Voralpen-Express also offers scenic views on the Alps and Prealps. Some notable peaks visible on the way are Pilatus, Rigi, Mythen, Speer, Churfirsten, and Säntis. The route also crosses several creeks and rivers, among others the Reuss, Biber, Alp, Sihl, Jona, Thur, and Sitter.

== Former rolling stock ==
Former logo

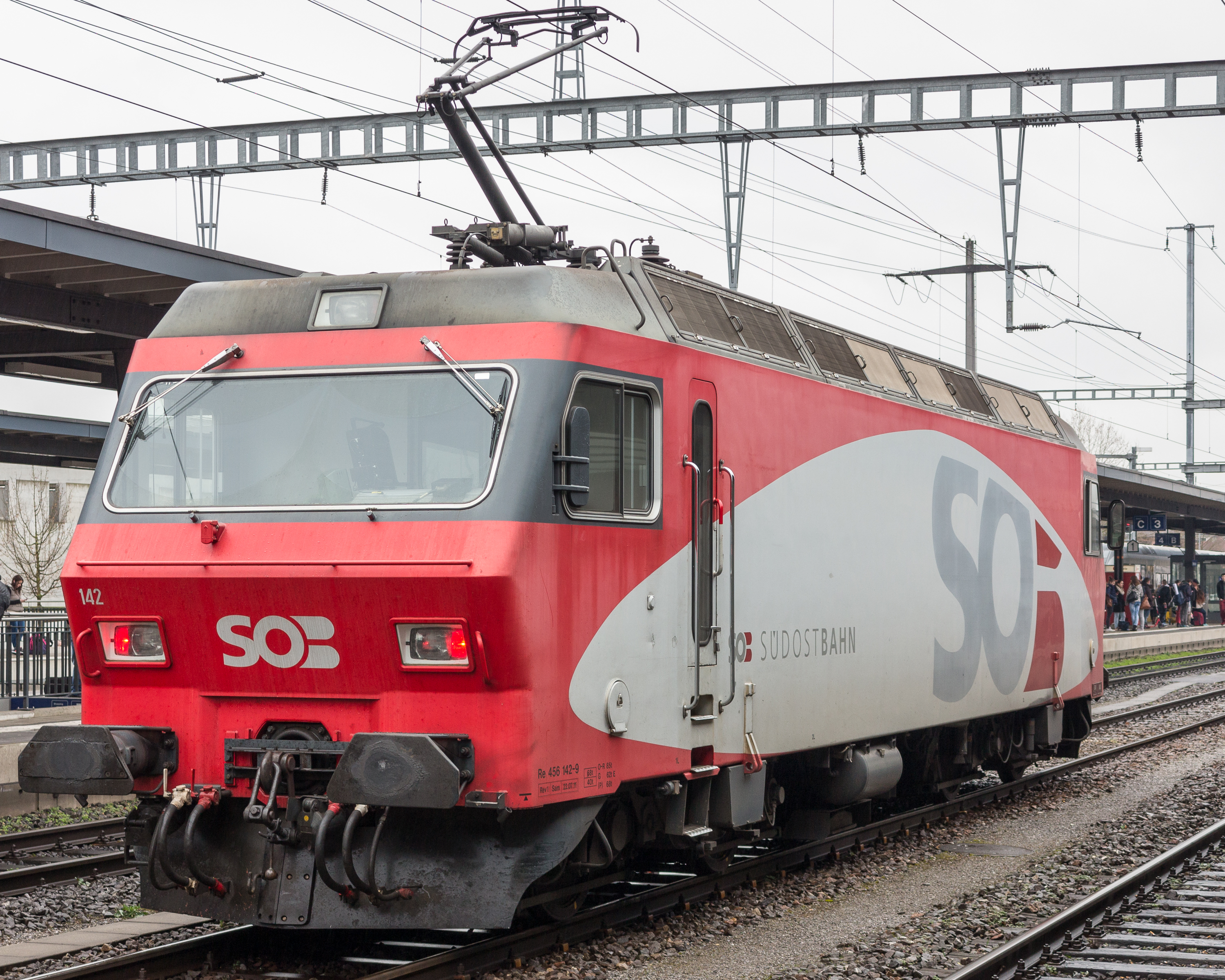
SLM Re 456 with former SOB livery

Between 2013 and 2019, fourteen locomotives and motor coaches formed seven pairs of motive power for the Voralpen-Express.

| Count | Vehicle | Vehicle numbers | Notes |
|---|---|---|---|
| 4 | Re 446 | 91 85 4 446 015–018 | locomotives worked as pairs (head and tail) during peak-hours |
| 6 | Re 456 | 91 85 4 456 091–096 | locomotives worked as pairs (head and tail) during peak-hours |
| 4 | RBDe 561 | 94 85 7 561 081–084 | NPZ motor coaches worked as pairs (head and tail) during peak-hours |

The Re 446 locomotives were purchaised from Swiss Federal Railways (Re 4/4^{IV}) in 1994 and 1996. The Re 456 locomotives were acquired by BT and named after towns along the former BT owend route. The different motive power vehicle types could not be combined. If less than five pairs were available, SOB leased a Re 420 (Re 4/4^{II}) from Swiss Federal Railways (in February 2014 it was Re 421 393), which could be used together with a Re 446.

Thirty-one air-conditioned Revvivo coaches, 1997/99 rebuilt from EW I coaches (Einheitswagen I, Swiss standard coaches I), were the backbone of the VAE coaching stock. Ten NPZ vehicles (1991/95) were later added to the stock to allow for enough capacity. Four older coaches were kept as a reserve, but the Revvivo prototype of 1995 (BR 748) had been withdrawn. The sets included first class coaches (A), bistro coaches with vending machines (BR), second class coaches (B), and part first part second class control trailers (ABt).

| Count | Coach | Coach numbers | Notes |
|---|---|---|---|
| 8 | Revvivo-A | 50 85 18-35 711–718 | |
| 1 | Bodan | 50 85 17-35 719 | Ex SBB B 6000/BT B 350, rebuilt in 1991; reserve |
| 16 | Revvivo-B | 50 85 20-35 721–736 | Numbers 735–736 with Schlieren bogies |
| 7 | Revvivo-BR | 50 85 20-35 741–747 | Numbers 741–744 were ex BT AB 251–254; 1 coach was kept as reserve |
| 6 | NPZ-B | 50 85 29-35 781–786 | Built in 1991; operated as pairs |
| 4 | NPZ-ABt | 50 85 80-35 181–184 | Built in 1995; control trailers used as intermediate trailers |
| 3 | B EW I | 50 85 20-35 753–754, 767 | Ex BT (1967–68); number 767 was kept as reserve |

Five trainsets were needed for the daily operation, and a sixth set was available in Herisau as a reserve. It allowed to exchange the sets in order to clean and maintain them. The six sets were either formed from two locomotives with seven coaches:

- Re–ABt–B–B–BR–A–B–B–Re (4 sets)

or with two motor coaches and six coaches:

- RBDe–A–B–B–BR–A–B–RBDe (2 sets)

The seventh pair of locomotives was kept as an additional reserve. Thus, if one motor coach RBDe needed maintenance, an additional set with locomotives could have been formed.

While the coaches and motor coaches had the typical white, green and blue livery and sported the former Voralpen-Express logo, the locomotives were frequently used as mobile advertising hoardings or showed the SOB livery.

The Revvivo coaches were in use for VAE until December 2019. They were afterwards sold to Le Train des Mouttes (a heritage railway) in France and MÁV Rail Tours in Hungary. The Re 446 locomotives were purchaised by Eisenbahndienstleister GmbH (EDG), while the Re 456 locomotives were sold to Sihltal Zürich Uetliberg Bahn (SZU), Verein Depot Schienenfahrzeuge Koblenz (DSF), and BRM Investment.

== See also ==
- Rail transport in Switzerland
- Tourism in Switzerland
