= Ricken Tunnel =

Swiss rail tunnel

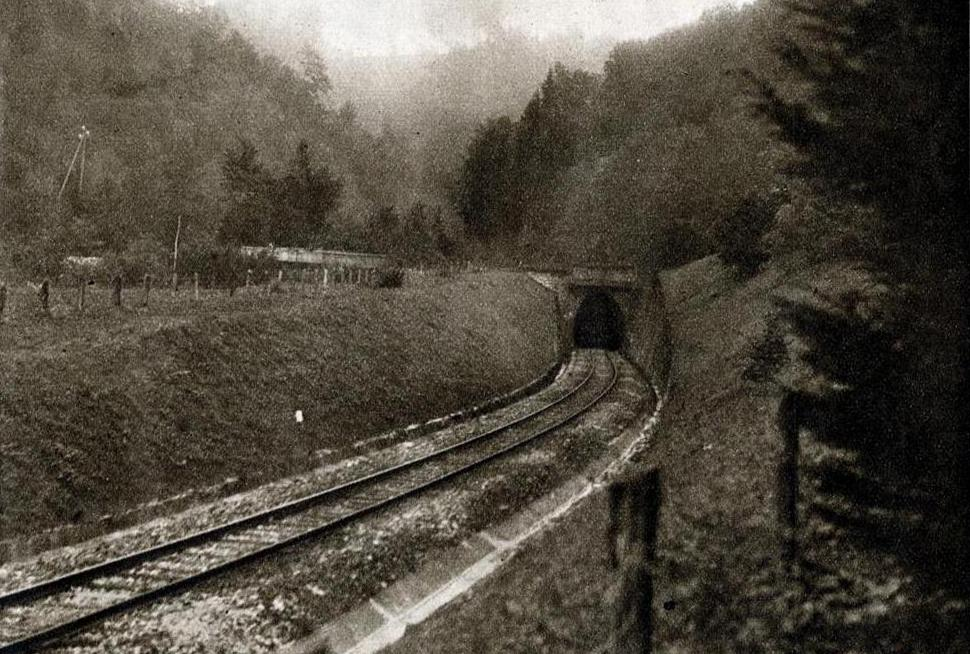
- The Kaltbrunn portal of the Ricken Tunnel in 1926, prior to electrification
- Interactive map of Ricken Tunnel

Overview
- Line: Uznach–Wattwil line
- Location: St. Gallen, Switzerland
- Status: Active

Operation
- Opened: 1 October 1910
- Owner: Swiss Federal Railways
- Operator: Swiss Federal Railways
- Traffic: Rail
- Character: Passenger and freight

Technical
- Length: 8.6 kilometres (5.3 mi)
- No. of tracks: 2
- Track gauge: 1,435 mm (4 ft 8 1/2 in)
- Electrified: Overhead catenary 15 kV AC 16 2/3 Hz

The Ricken Tunnel (German: Rickentunnel) is an 8.6 kilometres (5.3 mi) long rail tunnel under the Ricken Pass in eastern Switzerland. It is on the Swiss Federal Railway Uznach–Wattwil line, between Kaltbrunn station and Wattwil station. The tunnel, which accommodates a single track through, is relatively straight and has a constant incline of 15.75 ‰ from Kaltbrunn to Wattwill.

The Ricken Tunnel was constructed between 1904 and 1910, and was initially used by steam-hauled trains. Following a fatal incident on 4 October 1926 in which nine railway employees died as a result of carbon monoxide poisoning in the poorly ventilated tunnel, the line and tunnel were both electrified during 1927. The geology surrounding the tunnel is somewhat unfavourable, the rocks being prone to swelling and damaging the tunnel walls over time, necessitating repeated repairs and the occasional closure. During the 1990s, equipment for capturing geothermal energy was installed within the tunnel and has been used since; it remains open to railway traffic irrespective of this activity.

== Operational history ==
During January 1904, construction of the tunnel commenced. Its excavation proceeded at a rapid pace, to the extent that a record was set in the process. During the boring process, workers encountered pockets of natural gas as well as traces of oil. The tunnel proved to be relatively dry, with the use of cement drainage proving sufficient to handle the levels of water infiltration present. On 30 March 1908, breakthrough was achieved in the Ricken Tunnel.

The complete tunnel was first opened to traffic on 1 October 1910. Prior to its electrification, the line was initially operated by steam locomotives; during this period, the Ricken Tunnel acquired a negative reputation because of its relatively steep gradient and the lack of adequate ventilation, which caused smoke to accumulate and linger within it. No substantial alterations were made to the tunnel to address its apparent ventilation issues prior to a fatal incident occurring.

On 4 October 1926, a steam hauled freight train stalled while inside of the tunnel whilst attempting to ascend the gradient; this unplanned stop was a result of the use of the poor quality briquettes that were being used as fuel for the locomotive. Despite multiple attempts to rescue the train crew, a total of nine railway employees died of carbon monoxide poisoning, which included three of the rescuers. As a consequence, both the line and the tunnel were promptly electrified during the following year.

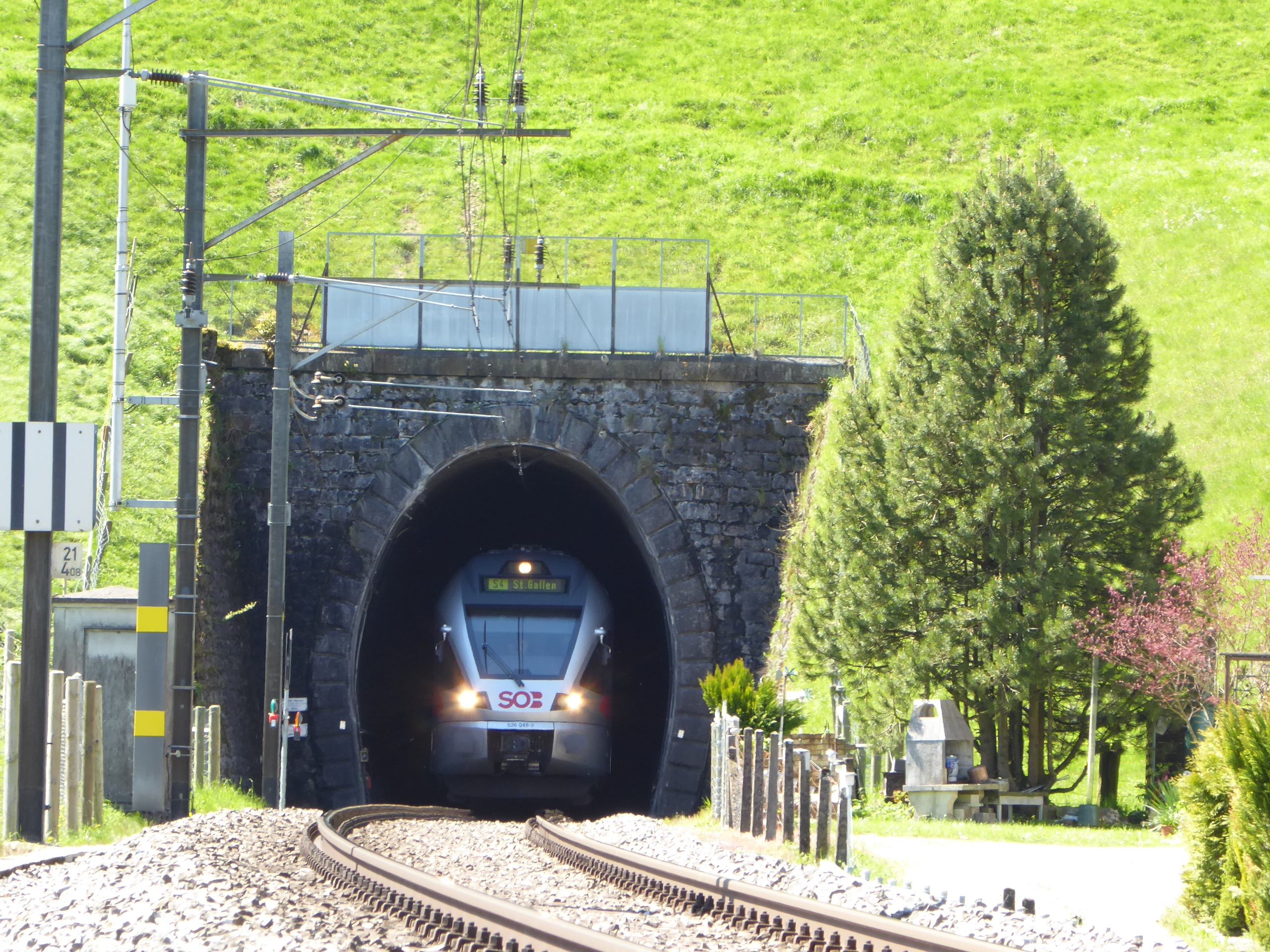
Portal of the Ricken Tunnel, note the presence of the overhead electrification apparatus

Since the tunnel's original construction, it has been subject to repeated remedial repairs over time. These have been partially attributed to the surrounding geology, which consists of a high proportion of clay minerals and anhydrite rocks, that absorbs water and swells, with the dimensional changes causing damage to the tunnel walls. These repairs have sometimes necessitated temporary closures of the Ricken Tunnel; during these periods of unavailability, rail-replacement buses via the Ricken Pass have been provided for the use of the travelling public.

During the 1990s, an energy capturing heat pump was installed at the southern portal of Ricken tunnel to function as a source of geothermal energy; by 2003, it was reportedly providing 501 kWt of energy to heat several public buildings in the neighbouring village of Kaltbrunn. This apparatus does not interfere with its use as an active railway tunnel.
