= Ricken Pass =

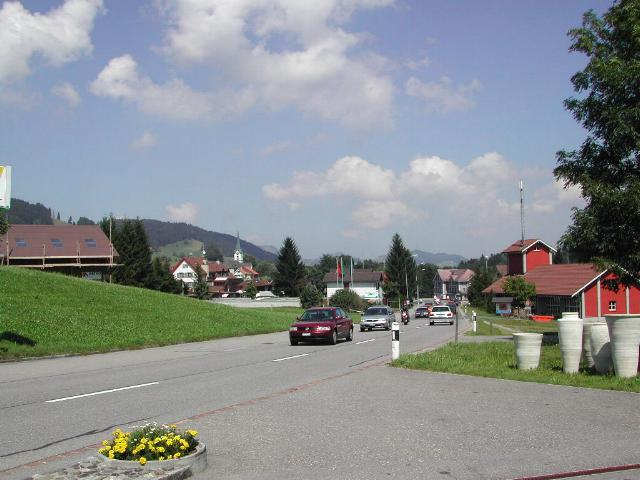
- Ricken Pass
- Interactive map of Ricken Pass
- Elevation: 790 metres (2,590 ft)

Third Approach
- Location: Switzerland
- Coordinates: 47°16′7″N 9°2′55″E

The Ricken Pass is a mountain pass in the canton of St. Gallen in eastern Switzerland. At a maximum altitude of 790 metres (2,590 ft), it connects the Linth valley and the Toggenburg.

The pass is crossed by a road, which has a maximum gradient of 9%. The Ricken Tunnel, an 8.6 kilometres (5.3 mi) long rail tunnel, runs under the pass.
