= Schärhorn =

Mountain in Switzerland

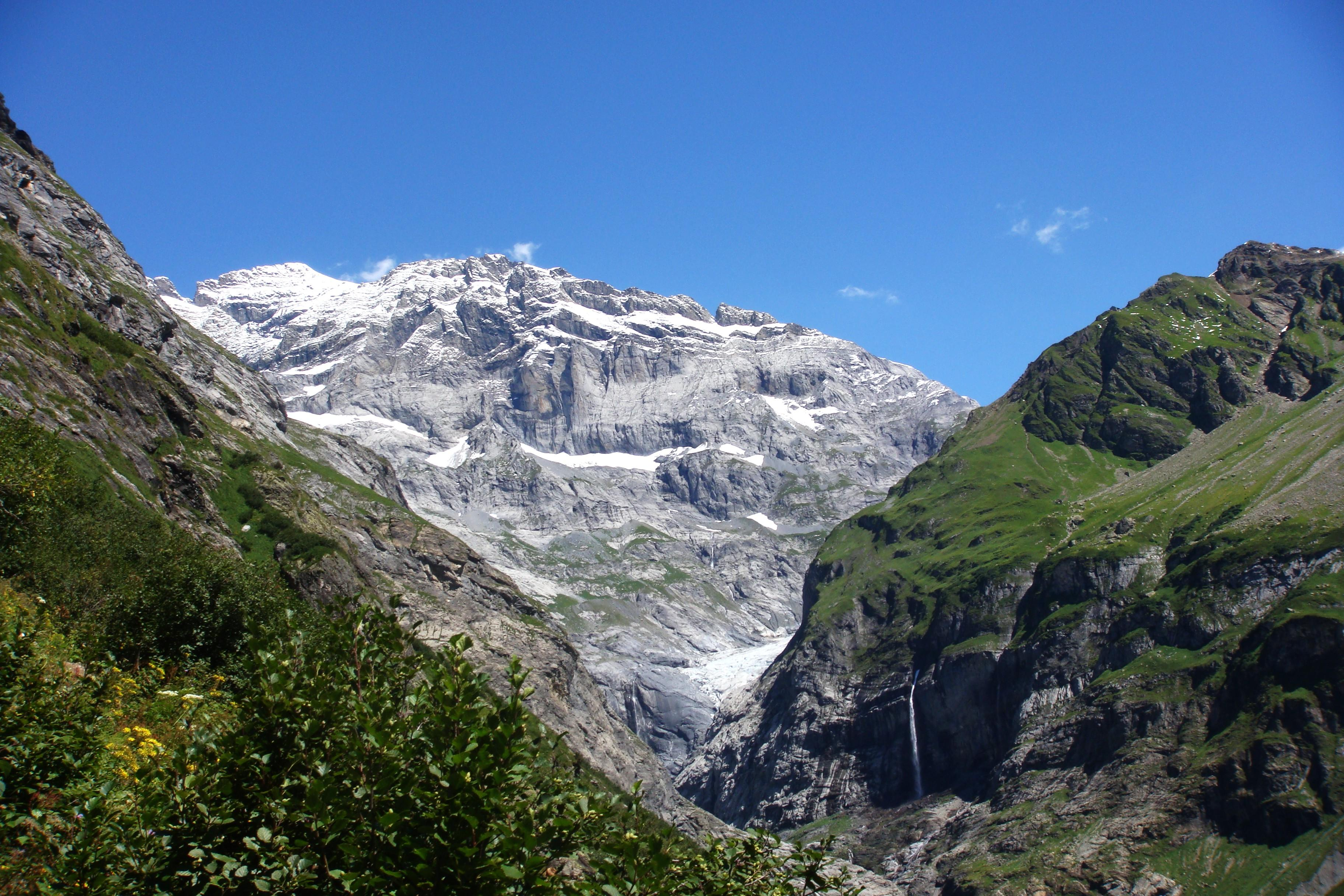
- The Gross Schärhorn (white peak) and the Bocktschingelgrat to its right from the start of the Maderanertal

Highest point
- Peak: Gross Schärhorn
- Elevation: 3,294 m (10,807 ft)
- Prominence: 514 m (1,686 ft)
- Parent peak: Tödi
- Listing: Alpine mountains above 3000 m
- Coordinates: 46°49′37″N 8°49′45″E

Geography
- Location within Switzerland
- Country: Switzerland
- Canton: Uri
- Parent range: Glarus Alps
- Topo map: Swiss Federal Office of Topography swisstopo

The Schärhorn is a Swiss mountain in the Glarus Alps near Klausen Pass. The highest summit is named Gross Schärhorn (3,297 m) while a second summit is named Chli Schärhorn (3,232 m). The mountain overlooks the valley of Schächental to the north side, and the Hüfifirn to the southeast, which finally leads to the Maderanertal to the southwest. Both valleys are located in the canton of Uri.
