= Clariden =

Mountain in Switzerland

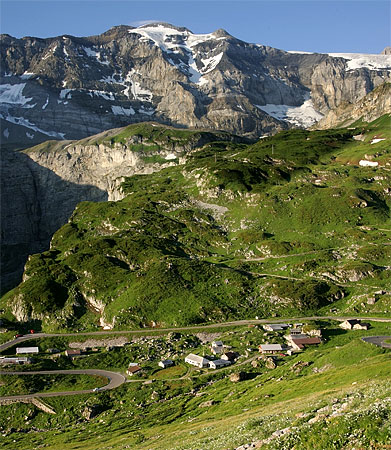
- The Clariden above Klausen Pass

Highest point
- Elevation: 3,267 m (10,719 ft)
- Prominence: 413 m (1,355 ft)
- Parent peak: Schärhorn
- Listing: Alpine mountains above 3000 m
- Coordinates: 46°50′31.5″N 08°52′16.5″E

Geography
- Location within Switzerland Location within Canton of Glarus Location within Canton of Uri
- Country: Switzerland
- Cantons: Glarus and Uri
- Parent range: Glarus Alps
- Topo map: Swiss Federal Office of Topography swisstopo

The Clariden is a mountain in the Glarus Alps, located at an elevation of 3,267 m (10,719 ft) between the Swiss cantons of Uri and Glarus. While on the north the Clariden overlooks the 1,948 m (6,391 ft) high Klausen Pass, the south side is covered by large glaciers and firn. The Hüfifirn on the west is drained by the Chärstelenbach, a tributary of the Reuss that eventually flows into Lake Lucerne. The Claridenfirn on the east is drained by the Linth that eventually flows into Lake Zurich.

The mountain lies in the municipalities of Silenen and Spiringen, in the canton of Uri, and Glarus Süd, in the canton of Glarus. The nearest settlements are the villages of Unterschächen to the north-west, and Linthal to the north-east, which lie at each end of the Klausen Pass.

== See also ==
- List of mountains of the canton of Glarus
- List of mountains of Uri
