= Kisten Pass =

Alpine pass in Switzerland

Kistenpass
- Location within Switzerland
- Elevation: 2,503 metres (8,212 ft)
- Traversed by: Trail (2,640 m)

Third Approach
- Location: Glarus/Graubünden, Switzerland
- Range: Glarus Alps
- Coordinates: 46°49′27″N 09°01′26″E

The Kistenpass (from German, Romansh: Pass Lembra) is an Alpine pass lying on the border between the Swiss cantons of Glarus and Graubünden. At 2,503 metres above sea level, it is the lowest point on chain connecting the Hausstock from the Tödi, in the Glarus Alps. The pass lies between the valleys of the Limmernsee (Glarus) and Val Frisal (Graubünden).

A trail crosses the range just north of the Kistenpass at a height of 2,640 metres, connecting Linthal to Breil/Brigels. The pass itself is not traversed by any trails since its north-west side consist of steep limestone cliffs overlooking the Limmernsee.
