= Glarus Alps =

Mountain range in central Switzerland

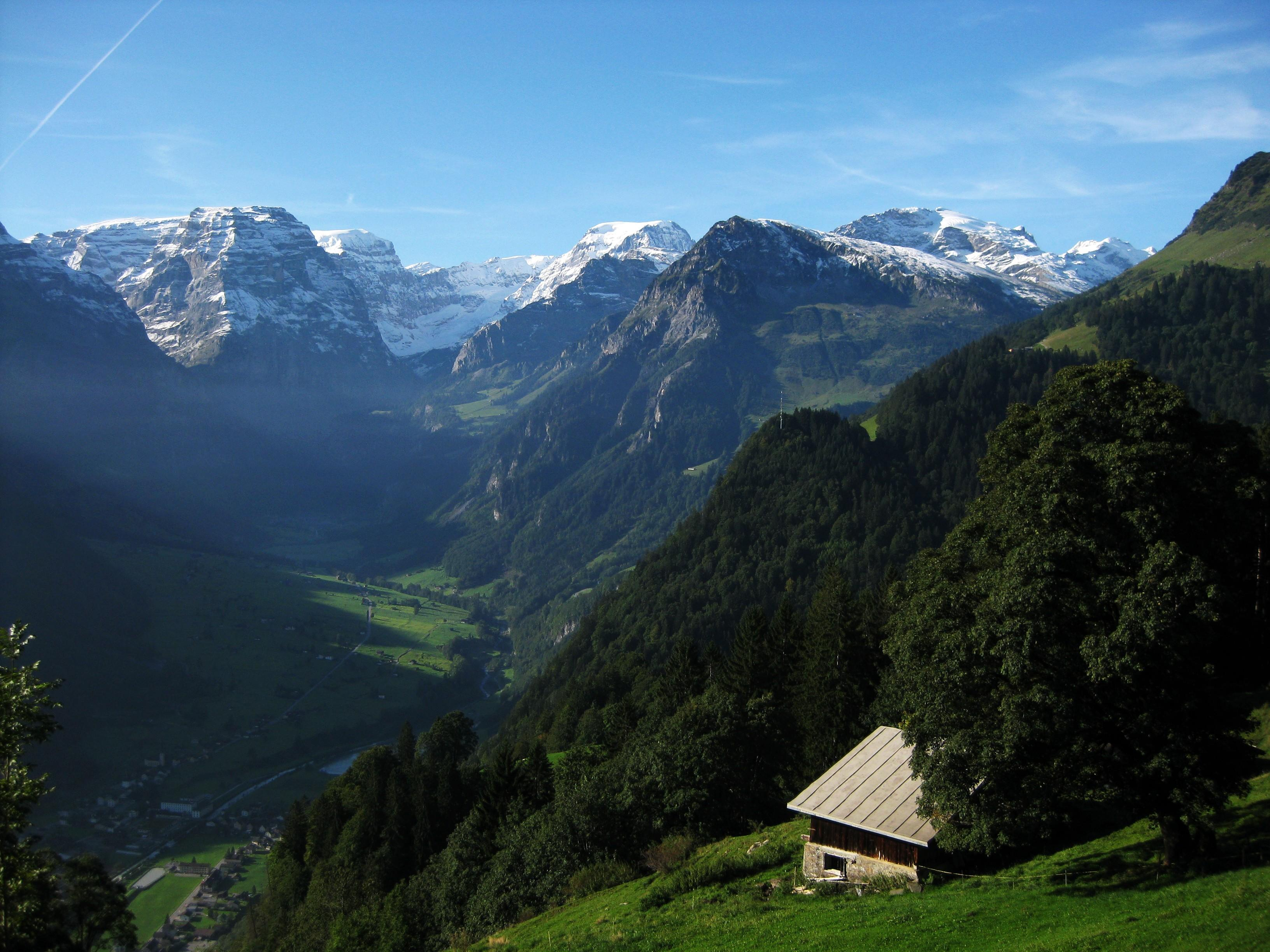
- Glarus Alps from Braunwald

Highest point
- Peak: Tödi
- Elevation: 3,614 m (11,857 ft)
- Coordinates: 46°48′40″N 8°54′53″E

Naming
- Native name: Glarner Alpen (German)

Geography
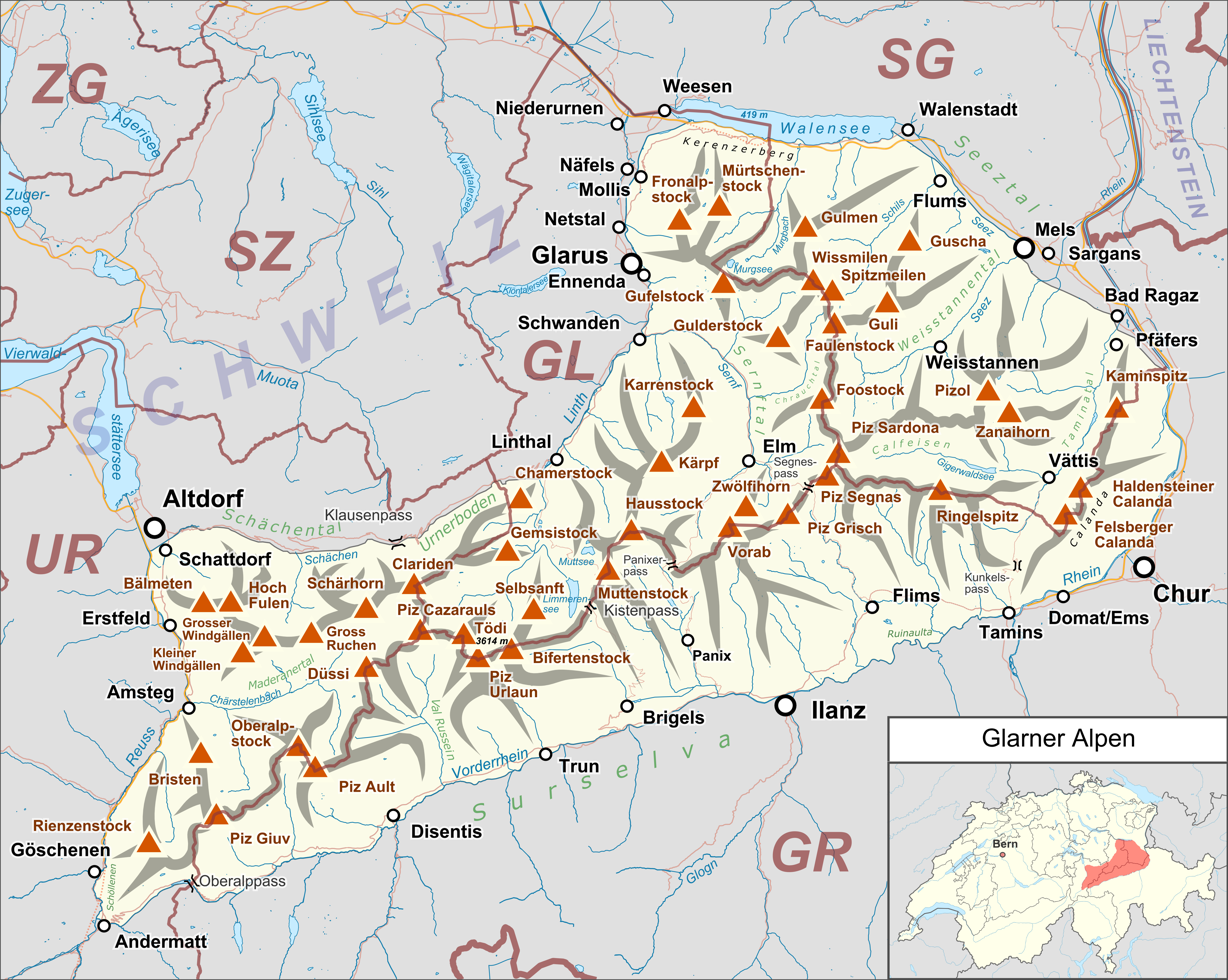
- Country: Switzerland
- Cantons: Glarus; Uri; Graubünden; St Gallen
- Range coordinates: 46°55.9′N 8°54.9′E
- Parent range: Western Alps
- Borders on: Uri Alps; Schwyz Alps; Appenzell Alps; Lepontine Alps; Western Rhaetian Alps
- Topo map: Swiss Federal Office of Topography swisstopo

Geology
- Orogeny: Alpine orogeny

The Glarus Alps (German: Glarner Alpen) are a mountain range in central Switzerland. They are bordered by the Uri Alps and the Schwyz Alps to the west, the Lepontine Alps to the south, the Appenzell Alps to the northeast. The eastern part of the Glarus Alps contains a major thrust fault that was declared a geologic UNESCO World Heritage Site (the Swiss Tectonic Arena Sardona).

The Glarus Alps extend well beyond the canton of Glarus, including parts of the cantons of Uri, Graubünden, and St Gallen. Conversely, not all the mountains in the canton of Glarus are part of the Glarus Alps, with those to the north of the Urner Boden and to the west of the valley of the river Linth considered to be part of the Schwyz Alps.

== Geography ==
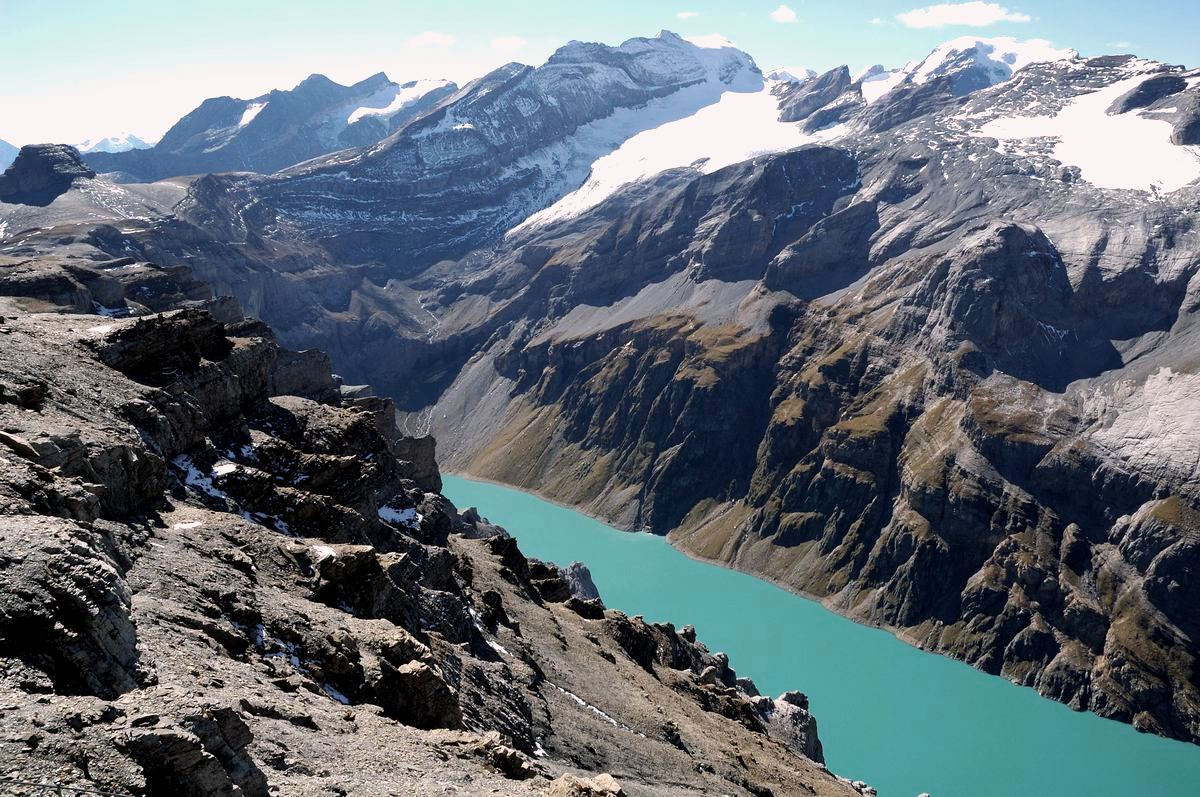
The Bifertenstock above Lake Limmernsee

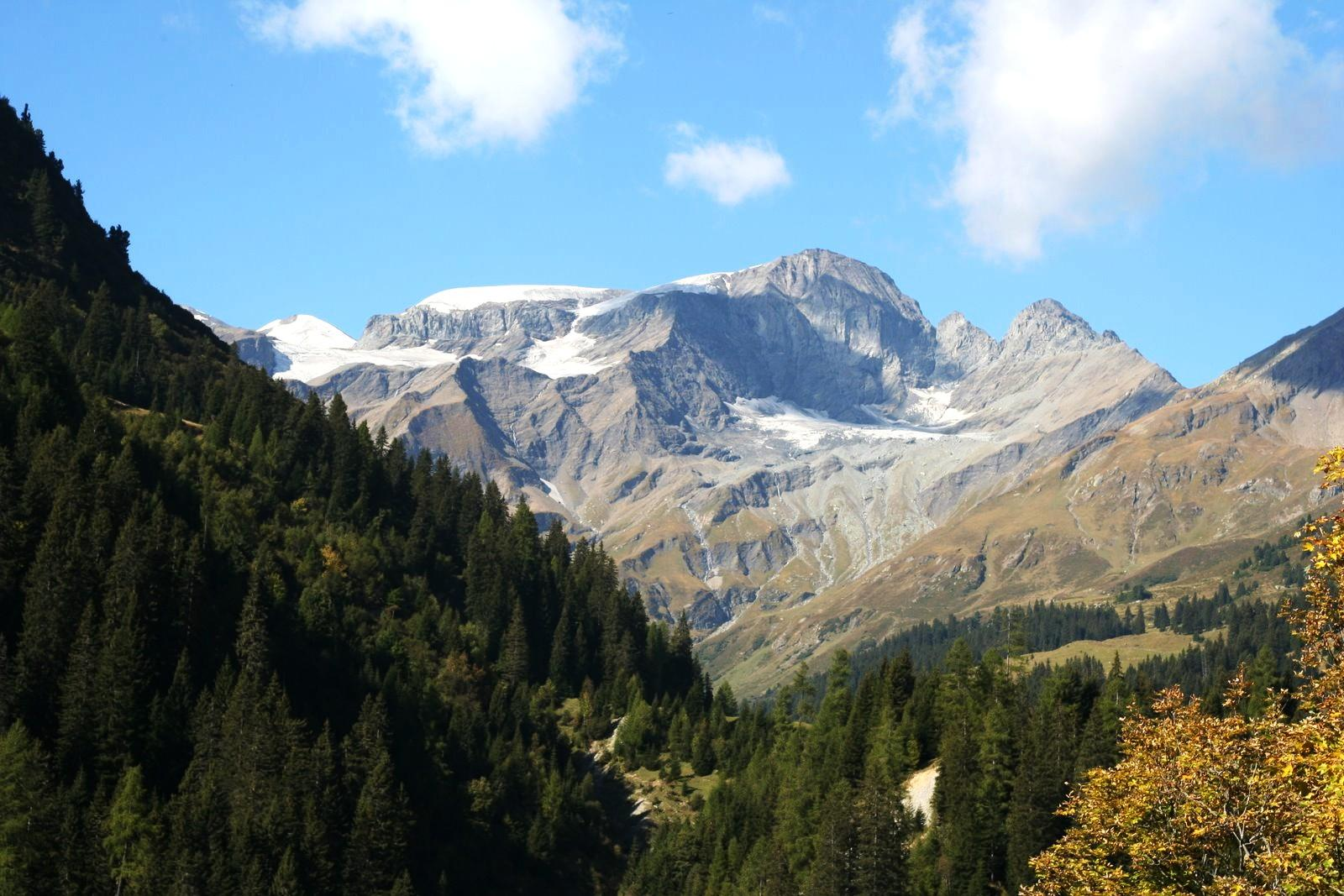
Calfeisen valley

The main chain of the Glarus Alps can be divided into six minor groups, separated from each other by passes, the lowest of which exceeds 7,500 ft. The westernmost of these is the Crispalt, a rugged range including many peaks of nearly equal height. The highest of these are the Piz Giuv (3,096 m) and Piz Nair. The name Crispalt is given to a southern, but secondary, peak of Piz Giuv, measuring 3,070 m. West of the main group is the Rienzenstock, while a northern outlier culminates in the Bristen. East of the Crispalt, the Chrüzli Pass separates this from the rather higher mass of the Oberalpstock (3,328 m).

Here occurs a partial break in the continuity of the chain. The crest of the snowy range connecting the Oberalpstock with the Tödi nowhere sinks to 9,000 feet, but makes a sweep convex to the north, forming a semicircular recess, whose numerous torrents are all poured into the Rhine through the Val Russein below Disentis. Two glacier passes lead over this part of the chain — one to west, over the Brunnigletscher to the Maderanertal; the other to the north-east, over the Sand Glacier, to the Linthal.

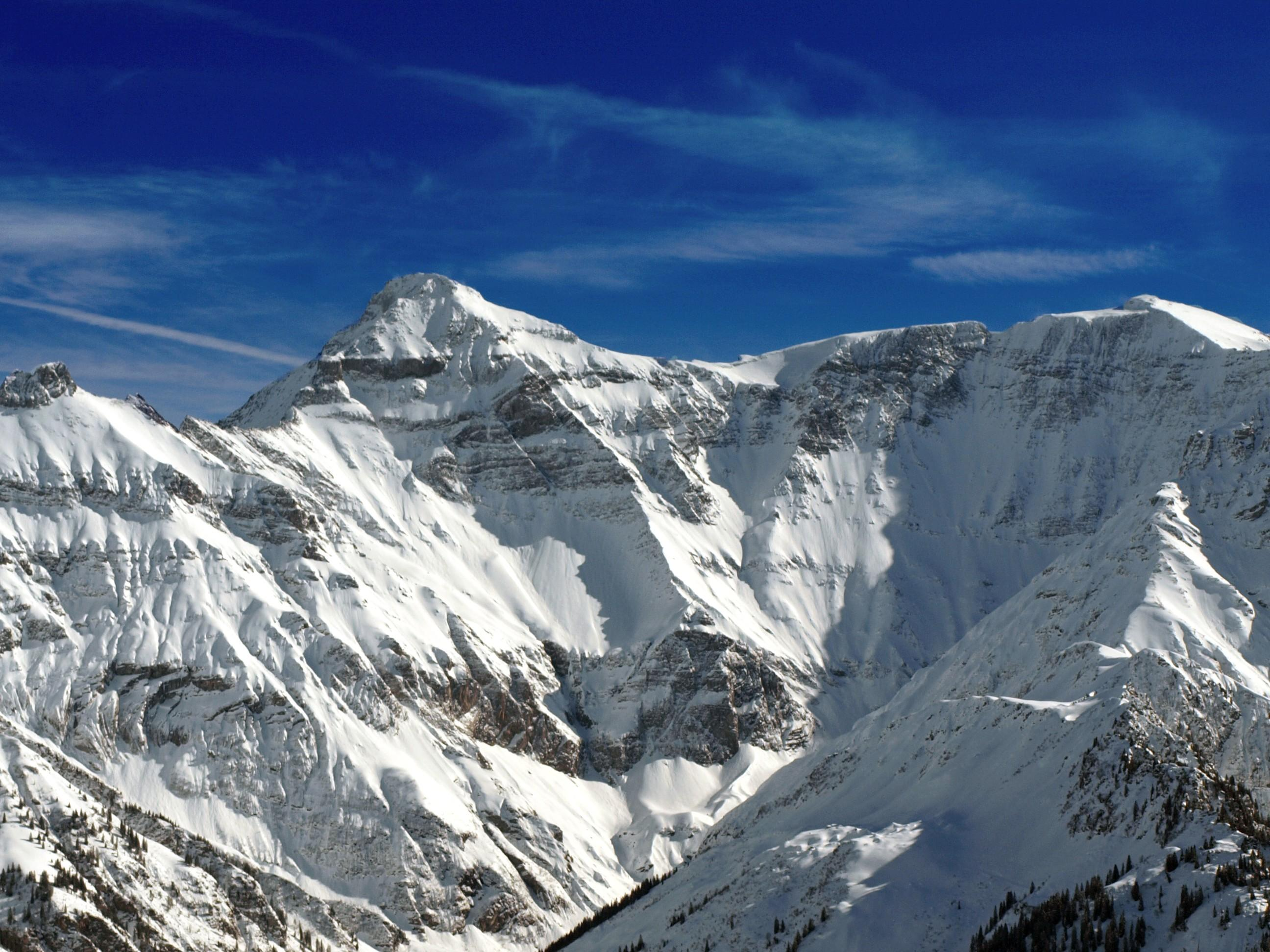
The massif of the Hausstock

The Tödi, the highest of the range and of north-eastern Switzerland (3,614 m), is attended by numerous secondary peaks that arise from the extensive snow-fields surrounding the central mountain. A very considerable outlyer, whose chief summits are the Schärhorn and the Gross Windgällen, belonging to the canton of Uri, is connected with the Tödi by the range of the Clariden Grat, north to the Hüfi Glacier. A less important branch encloses the Biferten Glacier, and terminates in the Selbsanft, south of Tierfehd. Towards the valley of the Vorderrhein a high promontory stretches nearly due south from the central peaks of the Tödi, and is crowned by the summit of the Piz Posta Biala. Another considerable ramification of the same mass terminates farther to the east in the peak of the Cavistrau.

The Kisten Pass separates the Tödi group from the Hausstock, whose summit attains 3,158 m; a branch of this latter group forms the range of the Kärpf in the canton of Glarus. The Hausstock is cut off from the rather lower but more extended mass of the Vorab by the Panixer Pass (7,907 ft). Numerous summits, of which the Vorab proper and Piz Grisch are the most important, approach very near, but do not quite attain to 10,000 feet.

The eastern limit of the latter group is marked by the Segnas Pass — the most frequented of those connecting the Canton Glarus with the Vorderrhein — beyond which arises a wide-stretching mass of rock and glacier, which is part of the Glarus thrust and culminates at Piz Sardona. This mass is cleft by a deep valley — the Calfeisental: one branch, culminating in the Pizol (2,844 m), extends east over Pfäfers, while another, including the highest peak of the canton of St. Gallen, the Ringelspitz (3,247 m), runs due east to the low Kunkels Pass (1,357 m), separating this range from the Calanda.

== Principal summits ==
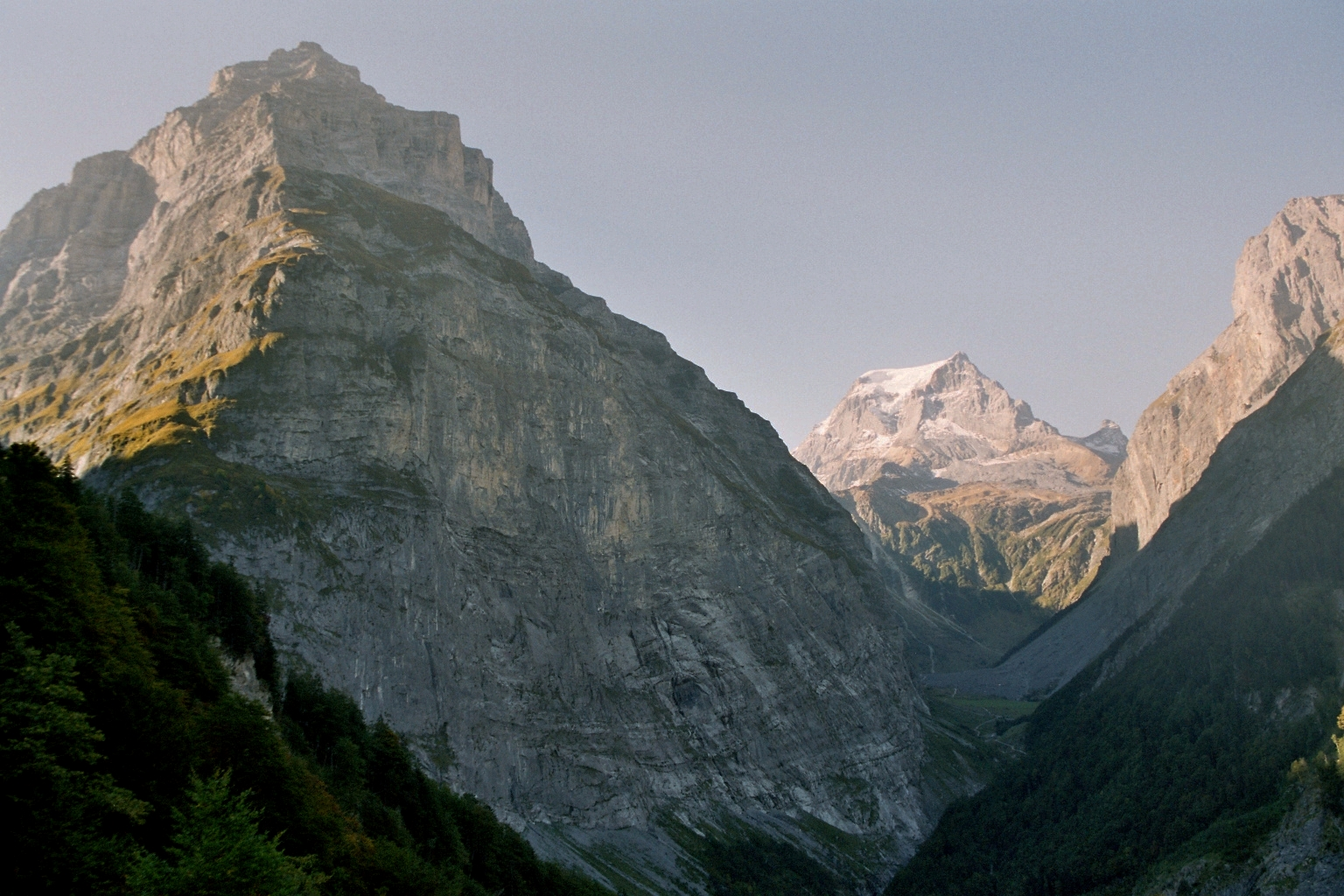
Selbsanft and Tödi

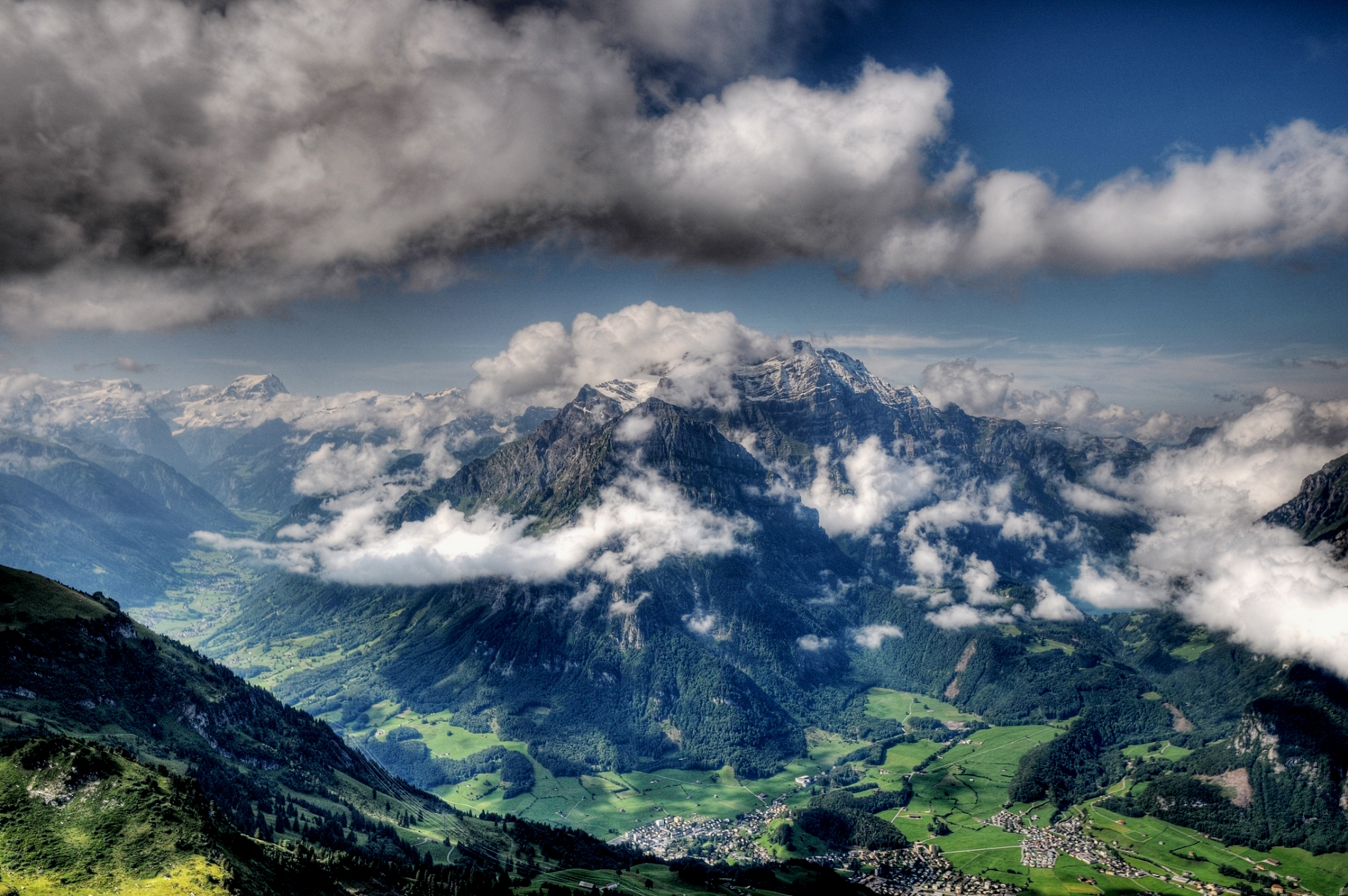
View from the summit of Fronalpstock

Name	Altitude
Piz Russein (Tödi)	3,613 m (11,854 ft)
Bifertenstock	3,419 m (11,217 ft)
Piz Urlaun	3,358 m (11,017 ft)
Oberalpstock	3,328 m (10,919 ft)
Gross Schärhorn	3,297 m (10,817 ft)
Clariden	3,267 m (10,719 ft)
Gross Düssi	3,256 m (10,682 ft)
Cavistrau Grond	3,251 m (10,666 ft)
Ringelspitz	3,247 m (10,653 ft)
Gross Windgällen	3,192 m (10,472 ft)
Hausstock	3,152 m (10,341 ft)
Gross Ruchen	3,136 m (10,289 ft)
Tristelhorn	3,114 m (10,217 ft)
Ruchi	3,107 m (10,194 ft)
Piz Segnas	3,102 m (10,177 ft)
Piz Giuv	3,098 m (10,164 ft)
Muttenstock	3,089 m (10,135 ft)
Hinderi Schibe	3,083 m (10,115 ft)
Crispalt	3,080 m (10,105 ft)
Bristen	3,074 m (10,085 ft)
Piz Cazarauls	3,063 m (10,049 ft)
Hinter Selbsanft	3,028 m (9,934 ft)
Bündner Vorab	3,025 m (9,925 ft)
Crap Mats	2,947 m (9,669 ft)
Piz Avat	2,910 m (9,547 ft)
Nüschenstock	2,893 m (9,491 ft)
Piz Ner	2,859 m (9,380 ft)
Tschingelhörner	2,850 m (9,350 ft)
Piz Sol Grauehorner	2,849 m (9,347 ft)
Sazmartinshorn	2,827 m (9,275 ft)
Zanaihorn	2,821 m (9,255 ft)
Mättlenstöck	2,808 m (9,213 ft)
Calanda	2,805 m (9,203 ft)
Kärpf	2,797 m (9,177 ft)
Piz Alpetta	2,764 m (9,068 ft)
Piz Dado	2,699 m (8,855 ft)
Hangsackgrat	2,634 m (8,642 ft)
Alpler Torstock	2,622 m (8,602 ft)
Fahnenstock	2,612 m (8,570 ft)
Schijen	2,610 m (8,563 ft)
Magerrain	2,528 m (8,294 ft)
Blistock	2,448 m (8,031 ft)
Mürtschenstock	2,442 m (8,012 ft)
Hochfinsler	2,423 m (7,949 ft)
Fil da Rueun	2,351 m (7,713 ft)
Chratzerengrat	2,349 m (7,707 ft)
Hochmättli	2,252 m (7,388 ft)

== Glaciers ==
Main glaciers :

- Hüfi Glacier
- Limmern Glacier
- Biferten Glacier
- Vorab Glacier

== Passes ==
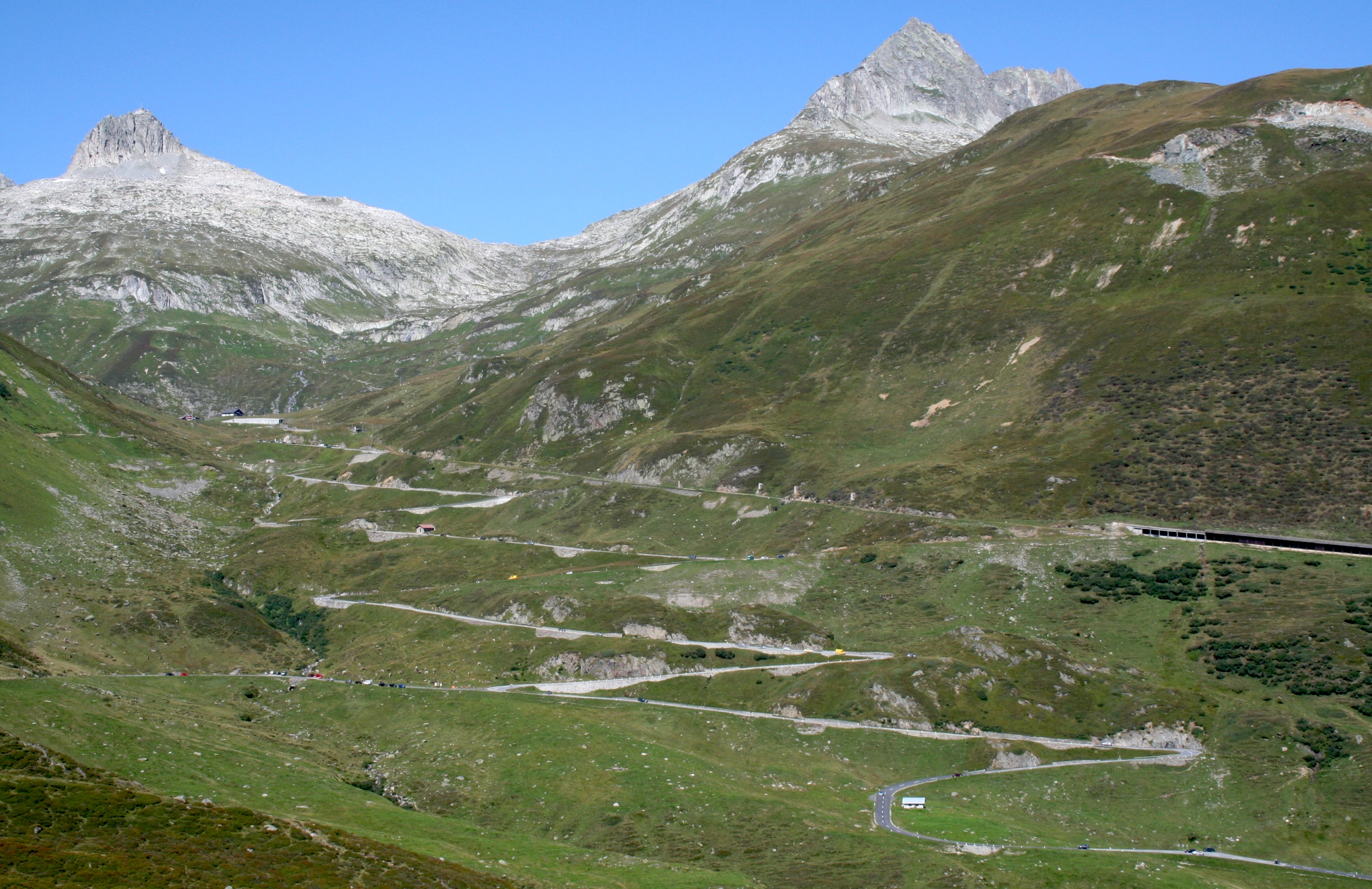
Oberalppass, eastern rise

The chief passes of the Tödi Range, from the Oberalp Pass to the Klausen Pass, are:

Note: road status as of 1911.

Mountain pass	Location	Type (as of 1911)	Elevation
Clariden Pass, Hüfi Pass	Maderanertal to Linthal	snow	2,942 m (9,652 ft)
Planura	Maderanertal to Linthal	snow	2,921 m (9,583 ft)
Chammlilücke	Maderanertal to Unterschächen	snow	2,833 m (9,295 ft)
Sardona Pass	Flims to Vättis	snow	2,757 m (9,045 ft)
Sand Alp Pass	Disentis to Linthal	snow	2,780 m (9,121 ft)
Brunni Pass	Disentis to Maderanertal	snow	2,721 m (8,927 ft)
Segnas Pass	Elm to Flims	footpath	2,625 m (8,612 ft)
Kisten Pass or Pass-Lembra	Linthal to Breil/Brigels	bad bridle path	2,501 m (8,205 ft)
Panixer Pass	Elm to Pigniu	bad bridle path	2,407 m (7,897 ft)
Chrüzli Pass	Maderanertal to Sedrun	footpath	2,346 m (7,697 ft)
Foo Pass	Elm to Weisstannen	bridle path	2,222 m (7,290 ft)
Oberalp Pass	Andermatt to Disentis	carriage road	2,044 m (6,706 ft)
Klausen Pass	Altdorf to Linthal	carriage road	1,948 m (6,391 ft)

== See also ==
- List of mountains of Graubünden
- List of mountains of the canton of Glarus
- List of mountains of the canton of St. Gallen
- List of mountains of Uri
- Swiss Alps

== Maps ==
- Swiss official cartography (Swiss Federal Office of Topography - Swisstopo); on-line version: map.geo.admin.ch
