= Piz Alpetta =

Mountain in Switzerland

- Location within Switzerland

Highest point
- Elevation: 2,764 m (9,068 ft)
- Prominence: 74 m (243 ft)
- Coordinates: 46°44′51.1″N 8°52′16.5″E

Geography
- Location: Graubünden, Switzerland
- Parent range: Glarus Alps

Piz Alpetta (2,764 m) is a mountain of the Glarus Alps, located near Disentis in the canton of Graubünden. It lies at the eastern end of the chain east of Piz Cavardiras, between the Val Russein and the main Rhine valley.
