= Limmern Glacier =

Glacier in Switzerland

Coordinates: 46°48′48″N 8°58′57″E

The Limmern Glacier (German: Limmernfirn) is a glacier situated in the Glarus Alps in the canton of Glarus in Switzerland. The glacier is situated below the mountains of Bifertenstock, to the south, and Schiben, to the north. Meltwater from the glacier flows eastwards into the Limmernsee and thence north into the Linth river.

In 2005, the glacier had a length of 3 km (1.9 mi). In 1973 it had an area of 2.09 km^{2} (0.81 sq mi).

== See also ==
- List of glaciers in Switzerland
- Swiss Alps
