= Piz Cavardiras =

Mountain in Switzerland

- Brichlig
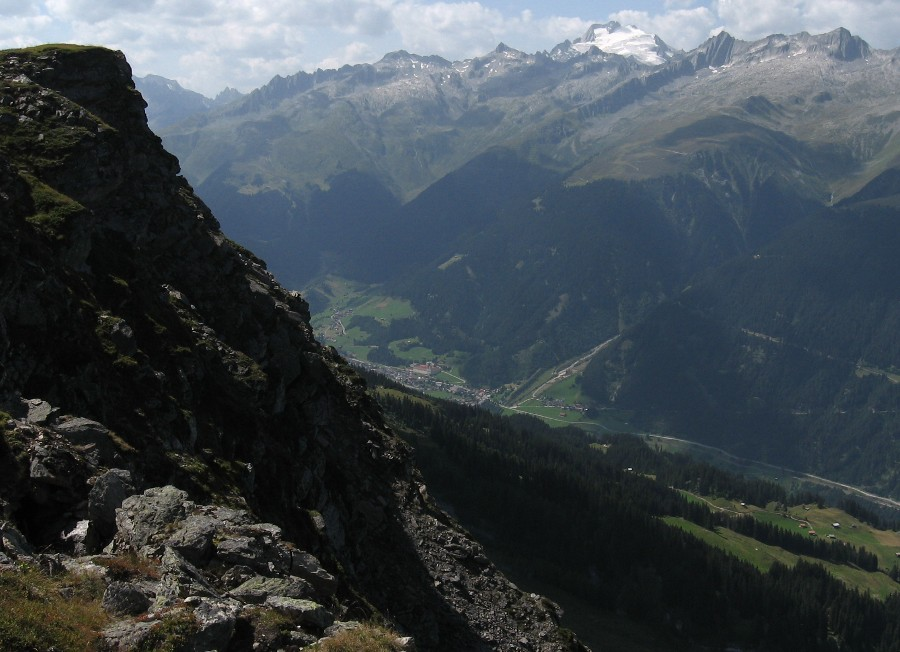
- View of the Oberalpstock (highest) and Piz Cavardiras (right)

Highest point
- Elevation: 2,964 m (9,724 ft)
- Prominence: 243 m (797 ft)
- Parent peak: Oberalpstock
- Coordinates: 46°44′15″N 8°48′47.6″E

Geography
- Location within Switzerland
- Location: Switzerland
- Parent range: Glarus Alps

Piz Cavardiras (or Brichlig) is a 2,964 metres high mountain in the Glarus Alps, located on the border between the cantons of Uri and Graubünden. The Cavardiras hut, owned by the Swiss Alpine Club, lies near the pass of Cavardiras on the north side.
