= Piz Ner =

Mountain in Switzerland

- Location within Switzerland

Highest point
- Elevation: 2,859 m (9,380 ft)
- Prominence: 89 m (292 ft)
- Coordinates: 46°46′08.2″N 8°56′52.8″E

Geography
- Location: Graubünden, Switzerland
- Parent range: Glarus Alps

Piz Ner is a mountain of the Glarus Alps, located north of Trun in the canton of Graubünden. It lies in the group south of Piz Urlaun.
