= Fil da Rueun =

Mountain in Switzerland

- Location within Switzerland

Highest point
- Elevation: 2,351 m (7,713 ft)
- Prominence: 152 m (499 ft)
- Coordinates: 46°49′32.6″N 9°08′26.8″E

Geography
- Location: Graubünden, Switzerland
- Parent range: Glarus Alps

The Fil da Rueun is a mountain of the Glarus Alps, overlooking Pigniu in the canton of Graubünden. The mountain lies between the Val da Pigniu (west) and Val da Siat (east).
