= Crap Mats =

Mountain in Switzerland

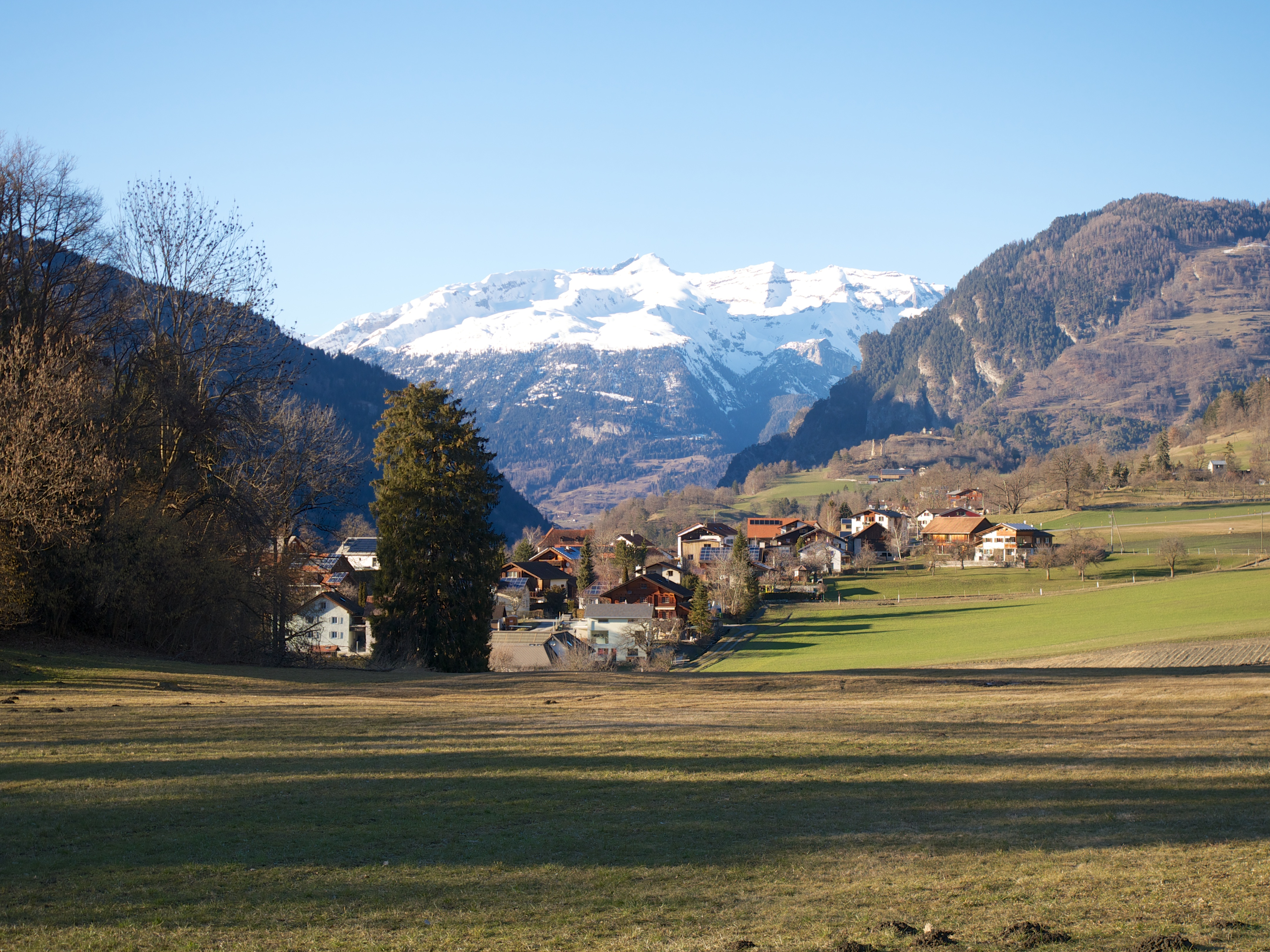
- Crap Mats, view from Fürstenau

Highest point
- Elevation: 2,947 m (9,669 ft)
- Prominence: 97 m (318 ft)
- Parent peak: Ringelspitz
- Coordinates: 46°52′41.7″N 9°21′26.4″E

Geography
- Location within Switzerland
- Location: Graubünden, Switzerland
- Parent range: Glarus Alps

The Crap Mats is a mountain of the Glarus Alps, overlooking the Rhine valley near Bonaduz in the canton of Graubünden. It lies just south of the Ringelspitz.

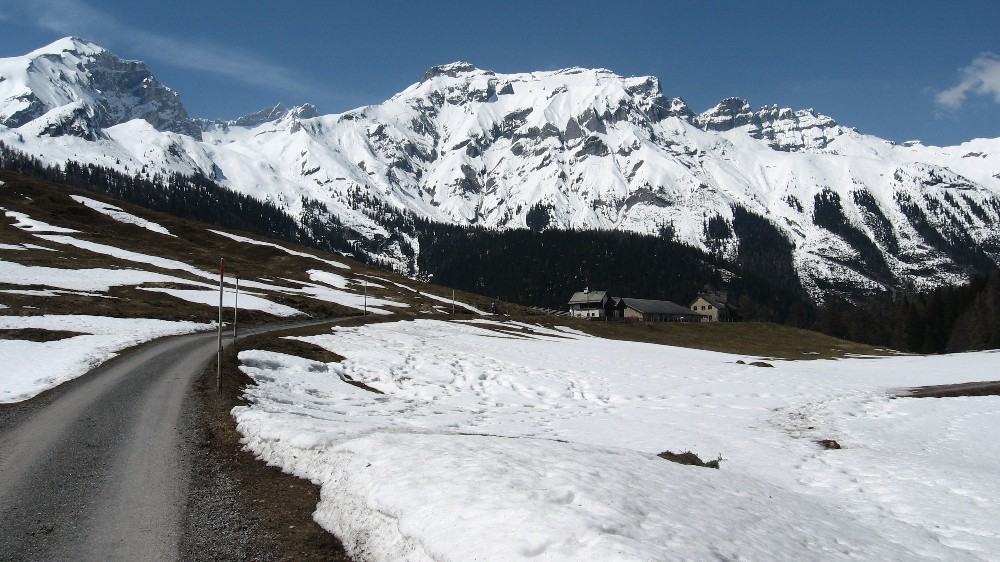
The Crap Mats (far left) and the Ringelspitz from the Kunkels Pass
