= Maderanertal =

Valley in the canton of Uri, Switzerland

Coordinates: 46°46′24″N 8°44′53″E

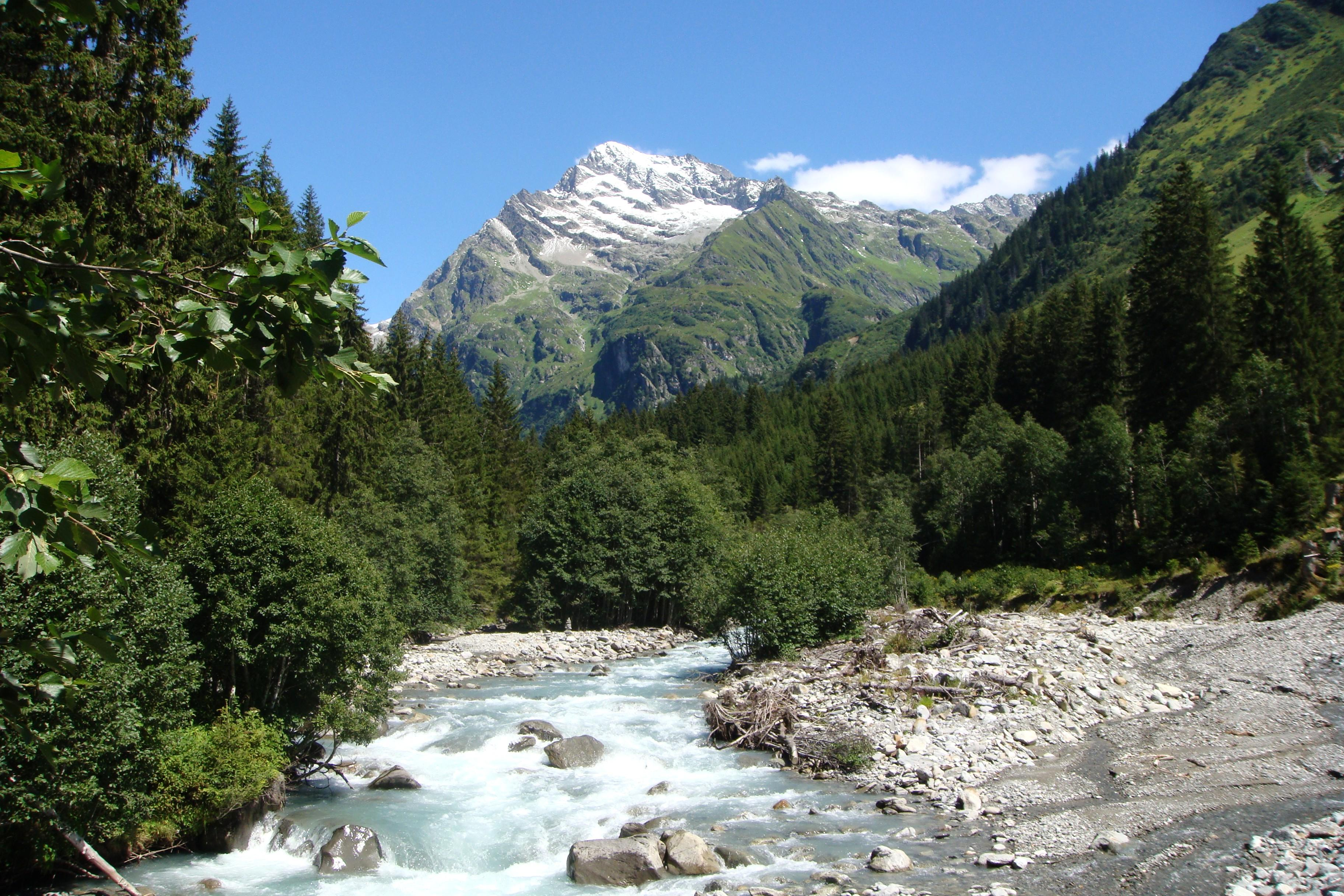
The Maderanertal. View towards the Düssi

The Maderanertal is an Alpine valley of the canton of Uri in Central Switzerland. It is drained by the Chärstelenbach, a stream that is a right tributary of the Reuss at Amsteg. The highest mountain in the Maderanertal is the Oberalpstock with a height of 3,328 metres above sea level. Other important summits are the Schärhorn, the Clariden, the Düssi, the Gross Windgällen, the Gross Ruchen, Piz Giuv and the Bristen.

The Maderanertal include two large lateral valleys: the Etzlital and the Brunnital, drained by the Etzlibach and the Brunnibach respectively (both left tributaries). The upper valley is heavily glaciated, the largest glacier being the Hüfi Glacier.

The Maderanertal belongs to the municipality of Silenen. The main locality is Bristen, at an elevation of 770 metres. The locality of Golzern, located near the Golzernsee at 1,400 metres, is a popular destination in the valley. It can be reached by a cable car.
