= Bifertenstock =

Mountain in Switzerland

- Romansh: Piz Durschin
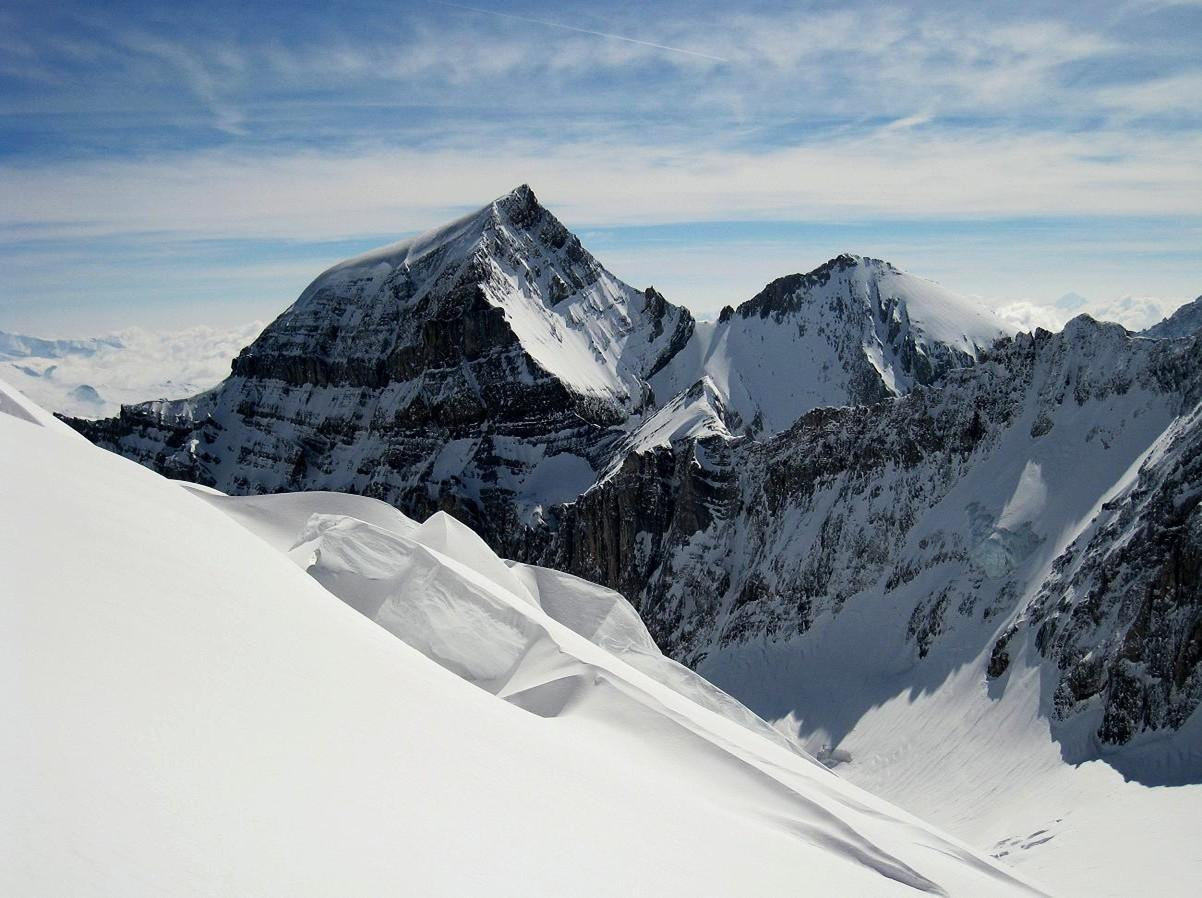

Highest point
- Elevation: 3,419 m (11,217 ft)
- Prominence: 385 m (1,263 ft)
- Parent peak: Tödi
- Listing: Alpine mountains above 3000 m
- Coordinates: 46°48′16″N 8°57′27″E

Geography
- Location within Switzerland Location within Canton of Glarus Location within Canton of Grisons
- Country: Switzerland
- Cantons: Grisons and Glarus
- Parent range: Glarus Alps
- Topo map: Swiss Federal Office of Topography swisstopo

The Bifertenstock, or Romansh: Piz Durschin), is a mountain in the Glarus Alps, located at an elevation of 3,419 m (11,217 ft) on the border between the cantons of Glarus (north) and Grisons (Graubünden, south); its peak, however, is located about 25 metres (82 ft) south of the border. It overlooks four valleys: the valley of the Biferten Glacier to the north-west, the Griess Glacier to the north-east, the Val Punteglias to the south, which leads down to Trun, and the Val Frisal on the south-east. Glaciers cover both sides of the mountain, but are smaller on the southern side.

The mountain lies in the municipalities of Trun and Breil/Brigels, in the canton of Grisons, and Glarus Süd, in the canton of Glarus. The nearest settlements are the villages of Trun, to the south, and Linthal, to the north.

== See also ==
- List of mountains of Graubünden
- List of mountains of the canton of Glarus
