= Alpler Torstock =

Mountain in Switzerland

- Location within Switzerland

Highest point
- Elevation: 2,622 m (8,602 ft)
- Prominence: 174 m (571 ft)
- Parent peak: Schächentaler Windgällen
- Coordinates: 46°53′42″N 8°46′53″E

Geography
- Location: Uri, Switzerland
- Parent range: Glarus Alps

The Alpler Torstock (2,622 m) is a mountain of the Glarus Alps, located north of Unterschächen in the canton of Uri. It lies west of the Schächentaler Windgällen, on the range between the valley of the Muota and the valley of Schächental.
