= Golzerensee =

Lake in Uri, Switzerland

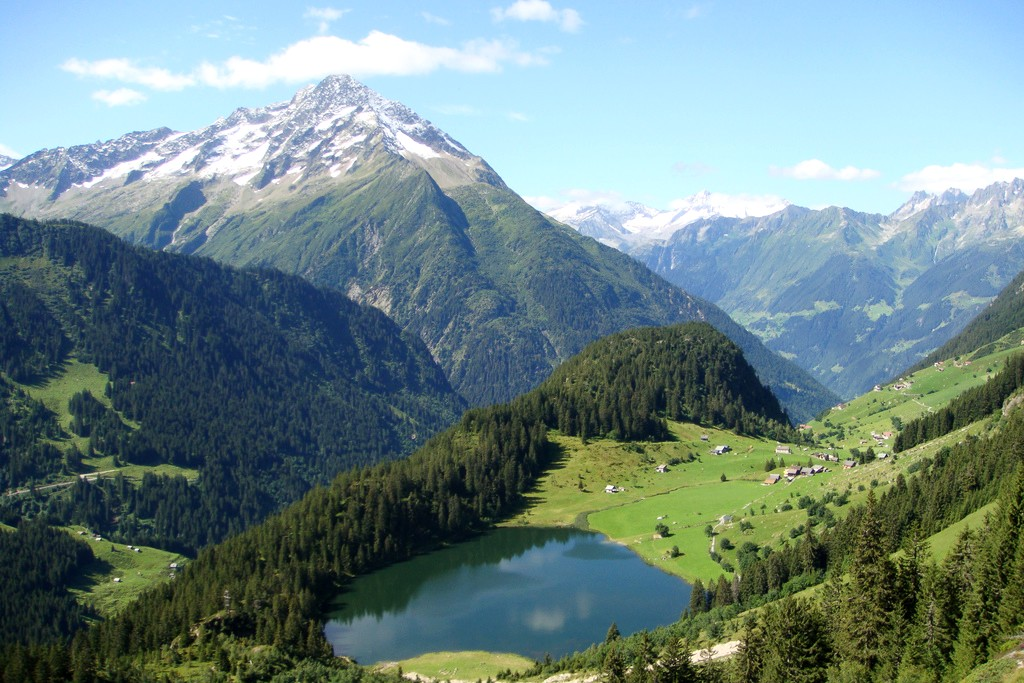

- Location within Canton of Uri Location within Switzerland Location within Alps
- Interactive map of Golzerensee
- Location: Silenen, Uri
- Coordinates: 46°46′33″N 8°44′23″E
- Primary outflows: Seebach
- Basin countries: Switzerland
- Surface area: 5.7 ha (14 acres)
- Surface elevation: 1,411 m (4,629 ft)

Golzerensee (some times Golzernsee) is a lake at Golzeren (also Golzern) in the Canton of Uri, Switzerland. Its surface area is 5.7 ha (14 acres). Golzeren is located in the Maderanertal and can be reached by cable car from Bristen (municipality of Silenen). The lake is a popular fishing location. Species include brown trout, rainbow trout, and perch.

== See also ==
- List of mountain lakes of Switzerland
