= Oberalpstock =

Mountain in Switzerland

- Piz Tgietschen
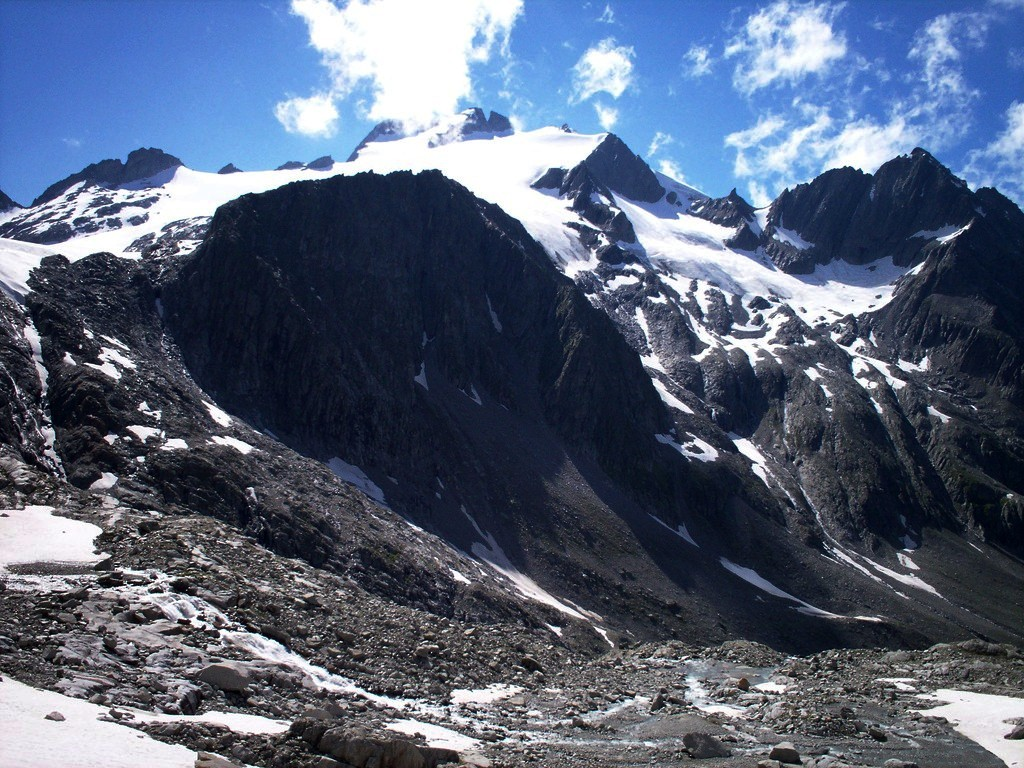
- Oberalpstock from east

Highest point
- Elevation: 3,328 m (10,919 ft)
- Prominence: 709 m (2,326 ft)
- Parent peak: Tödi
- Isolation: 12.7 km (7.9 mi)
- Listing: Alpine mountains above 3000 m
- Coordinates: 46°44′33.1″N 8°46′10.1″E

Geography
- Location within Switzerland
- Location: Graubünden/Uri, Switzerland
- Parent range: Glarus Alps

The Oberalpstock or Piz Tgietschen is a mountain in the Glarus Alps between the cantons of Uri and Graubünden. Its massif separates the valleys of Maderanertal (Uri) and Surselva near Sedrun (Graubündnen).

The Oberalpstock is the highest summit of the Glarus Alps west of the Tödi, and also the highest mountain in the canton of Uri east of the Reuss.

== See also ==
- List of mountains of Graubünden
- List of mountains of Uri
- List of most isolated mountains of Switzerland
