= Piz Urlaun =

Mountain in Switzerland

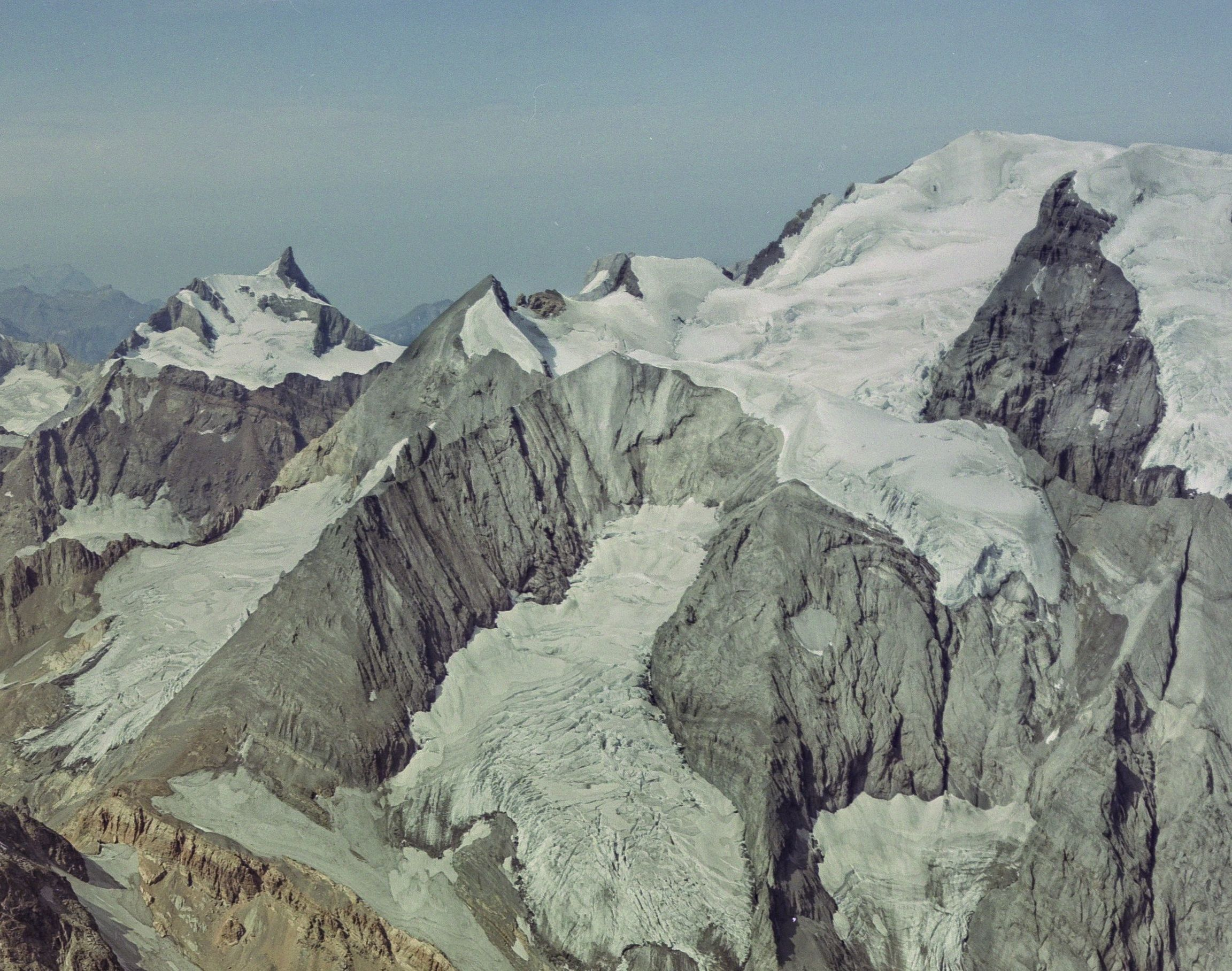
- Aerial view of the Piz Urlaun from the southeast, 1971

Highest point
- Elevation: 3,358 m (11,017 ft)
- Prominence: 99 m (325 ft)
- Parent peak: Tödi
- Coordinates: 46°47′47.3″N 8°55′41.2″E

Geography
- Location within Switzerland Location within Canton of Glarus Location within Canton of Grisons
- Country: Switzerland
- Cantons: Glarus / Grisons
- Parent range: Glarus Alps

Piz Urlaun is a mountain of the Glarus Alps, located on the border between the Swiss cantons of Glarus and Grisons (Graubünden). It lies on the ridge between the Tödi and the Bifertenstock.

== See also ==
- List of mountains of Graubünden
- List of mountains of the canton of Glarus
