= Piz Avat =

Mountain in Switzerland

- Location within Switzerland

Highest point
- Elevation: 2,910 m (9,550 ft)
- Prominence: 70 m (230 ft)
- Parent peak: Piz Glivers Dadens
- Coordinates: 46°46′03.4″N 8°54′22.8″E

Geography
- Location: Graubünden, Switzerland
- Parent range: Glarus Alps

Piz Avat is a mountain of the Glarus Alps, located north of Sumvitg in the canton of Graubünden. It overlooks the Val Russein on its west side.
