= Linthal, Glarus =

Linthal
- Village (and former municipality)
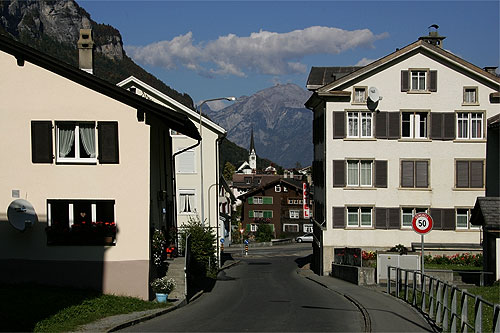

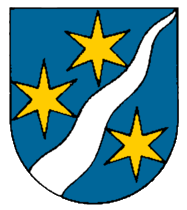
- Coat of arms

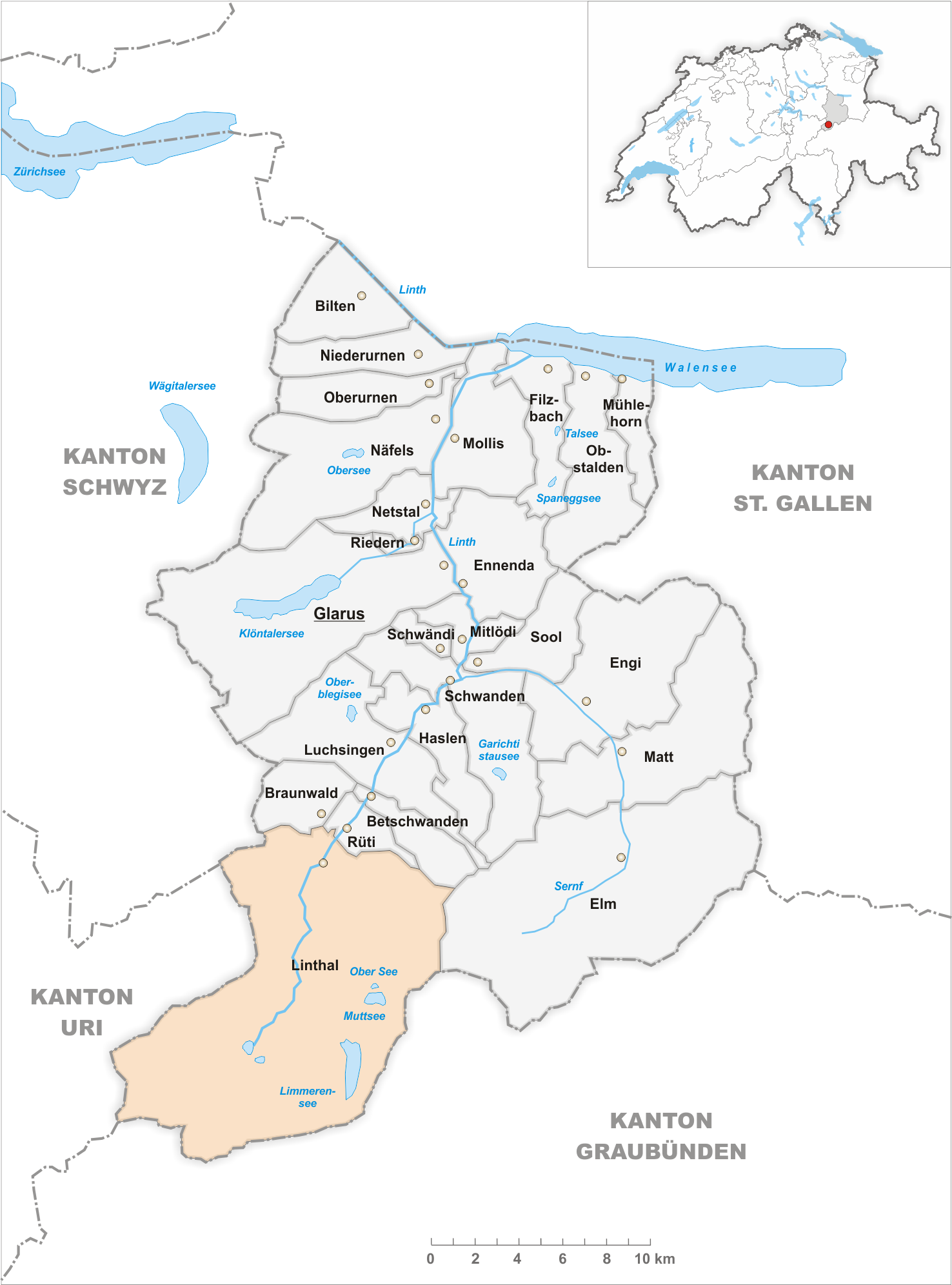
- The former municipal area (2007)
- Coordinates: 46°55′N 9°00′E
- Country: Switzerland
- Canton: Glarus
- Municipality: Glarus Süd

Area
  - Total: 131.24 km^{2} (50.67 sq mi)
- Elevation: 650 m (2,130 ft)

Population (December 2020)
  - Total: 1,088
  - Density: 8.290/km^{2} (21.47/sq mi)

Linthal is a village and former municipality in the municipality of Glarus Süd and canton of Glarus in Switzerland. The village lies near the head of the valley of the Linth river, and at the foot of the Klausen Pass into the canton of Uri. It is the terminus of the railway line that traverses the length of Glarus.

== History ==
Aerial view from 300 m by Walter Mittelholzer (1923)

Linthal is first mentioned in 1289 as Lintal.

In 1879, Linthal was connected to the Swiss railway network by the opening of the Swiss Northeastern Railway line from Weesen. The road over the Klausen Pass was built between 1895 and 1900.

Construction of the Linth–Limmern hydro-electric power scheme, in the mountains above Linthal, commenced in 1957, and was fully operational by 1968.

In 2011, the municipality of Linthal was merged into the new municipality of Glarus Süd.

== Geography ==
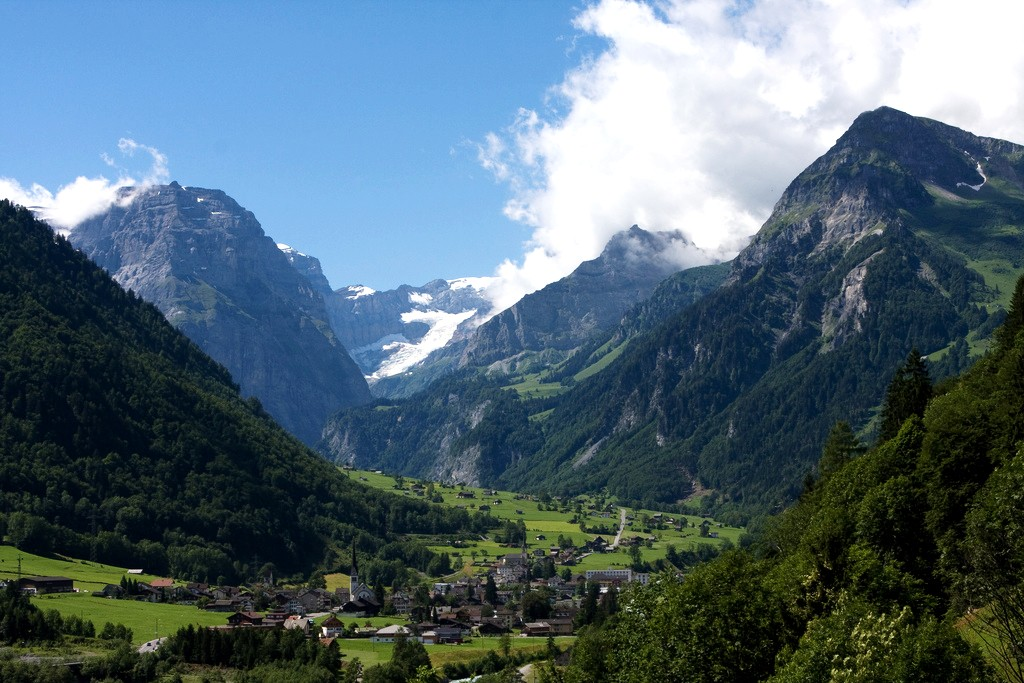
Linthal, looking across the village towards the upper end of the valley

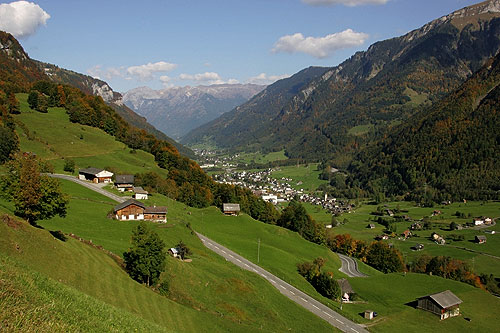
View of village, looking down the valley from the Klausen Pass road

The village Linthal lies at the head of the valley of the Linth river, at an altitude of approximately 650 m (2,130 ft). It is surrounded by mountains, including Ortstock (2,717 m or 8,914 ft), Clariden (3,267 m or 10,719 ft), Tödi (3,614 m or 11,857 ft), Bifertenstock (3,419 m or 11,217 ft), Selbsanft (3,029 m or 9,938 ft), Ruchi (3,107 m or 10,194 ft), Hausstock (3,158 m or 10,361 ft) and Kärpf (2,794 m or 9,167 ft). The Klausen Pass climbs out of the valley between the Ortstock and Clariden and carries a road into the canton of Uri. The Richetli Pass, between the Kärpf and Hausstock, carries a walking trail to the head of the valley of the Sernf river, a tributary of the Linth.

The village is divided into three sections: Matt, Dorf and Ennetlinth. To the north of Linthal, the next village down the valley is that of Rüti, whilst the resort village of Braunwald lies on a terrace some 600 m (2,000 ft) above the valley.

To the south, there are no further villages in the valley, but a side road continues past scattered farmsteads to Tierfehd, where there is one of the Linth–Limmern power stations. Beyond Tierfehd, the Linth valley splits into several tributary valleys, including those of the Oberstafelbach, the Bifertenbach, the Sandbach, the Walenbach and the Limmerenbach. These collect the water from several glaciers, including the Clariden Glacier and the Biferten Glacier, and drain the Limmerensee, a reservoir created as part of the Linth–Limmern scheme.

The former municipal boundaries of Linthal, as of 2006, included all of the watershed of the Linth and its tributaries upstream of the village. This encompasses an area of 131.2 km^{2} (50.7 sq mi), of which 16.9% is used for agricultural purposes, while 15.5% is forested. Of the rest of the land, 0.9% is settled (buildings or roads) and the remainder (66.8%) is non-productive (rivers, glaciers or mountains). It was the largest municipality in the Canton of Glarus, and is about 1/5 of the total area in the canton.

== Transport ==
Linthal is located on the Hauptstrasse 17, which runs the length of the canton of Glarus before climbing the Klausen Pass into the canton of Uri, as well as being the terminus of the Weesen to Linthal railway line that parallels the main road and the Linth river through Glarus. The high alpine Klausen Pass is normally only open to traffic between June and September, and for the rest of the year the road and railway up the valley form the only access to the village.

There are two railway stations within the village. Linthal station is the main station, and the terminus of the line, whilst Linthal Braunwaldbahn station provides a convenient interchange between the main line railway and the Braunwald funicular that links Linthal with the resort of Braunwald on the slopes above. Both stations are served by the hourly Zürich S-Bahn service S25 from Zürich.

PostBus Switzerland operates a service from Linthal station to Fluelen station, on the Gothard railway and Lake Lucerne, which provides several daily return journeys across the Klausen Pass between May and September. Outside that period, a minibus service called the Urnerboden Sprinter provides three connections a day to Urnerboden on the route to the pass.

From Tierfehd, aerial cableways lead to Kalktrittli and Baumgartenalp. The funicular of the Linth-Limmern plant, Standseilbahn Linth-Limmern, starts from there as well.

== Demographics ==
Linthal, as of 31 December 2020 and as defined by its former municipal boundaries, has a population of 1,088. As of 2007, 11.0% of the population was made up of foreign nationals. Over the last 10 years the population has decreased at a rate of -21.6%. Most of the population (as of 2000) speaks German (84.2%), with Italian being second most common ( 4.0%) and Serbo-Croatian being third (2.8%).

In the 2007 federal election the most popular party was the SPS which received 48.7% of the vote. Most of the rest of the votes went to the SVP with 41.7% of the vote.

In Linthal about 52% of the population (between age 25-64) have completed either non-mandatory upper secondary education or additional higher education (either University or a Fachhochschule).

Linthal has an unemployment rate of 2.22%. As of 2005, there were 64 people employed in the primary economic sector and about 26 businesses involved in this sector. 128 people are employed in the secondary sector and there are 13 businesses in this sector. 177 people are employed in the tertiary sector, with 41 businesses in this sector.

The historical population is given in the following table:

year	population
1777	994
1799	1,538
1850	1,745
1880	2,301
1900	1,894
1950	1,741
1960	2,645
1970	1,458
2000	1,200
