= Tödi =

Mountain in Switzerland

- Tödi and Biferten Glacier (left)

Highest point
- Peak: Piz Russein
- Elevation: 3,613 m (11,854 ft)
- Prominence: 1,570 m (5,150 ft)
- Parent peak: Finsteraarhorn
- Isolation: 42.1 km (26.2 mi)
- Listing: Canton high point Ultra; Alpine mountains above 3000 m
- Coordinates: 46°48′40″N 8°54′53″E

Naming
- Language of name: German

Geography
- Location within Switzerland Location within Canton of Glarus Location within Canton of Grisons
- Country: Switzerland
- Cantons: Glarus and Grisons
- Parent range: Glarus Alps
- Topo map: Swiss Federal Office of Topography swisstopo

Geology
- Mountain type: Limestone

Climbing
- First ascent: In 1824 by Augustin Bisquolm and Placi Curschellas

The Tödi (3,613 metres (11,854 ft)) is a mountain massif and with the mountain peak Piz Russein the highest mountain in the Glarus Alps and the highest summit in the canton of Glarus, Switzerland. It is located on the border between the cantons of Grisons (Graubünden) to the south, and Glarus to the north, close to the point where those two cantons meet the canton of Uri, to the west. Although not the culminating point of Grisons, it is its highest peak outside the Bernina range.

== Geography ==
Aerial view of the summit area of the Tödi from the southeast, with Piz Russein in the center of the image, the Glarner Tödi above the glacier to the right of the center, and the Sandgipfel at the right edge of the image (see the annotations in the image)

The Tödi lies in the west part of the Glarus Alps, between Linthal on the north and Disentis on the south. The Tödi is a vast mountain massif projecting as a promontory to the north from the range that divides the basin of the Linth from that of the Rhine.

There are three principal peaks. The lowest, and northernmost, which is that seen from the Ober Sand Alp, is called Sandgipfel (3,398 m [11,148 ft]). The Glarner Tödi (3,571 m [11,716 ft]), long supposed to be the highest, and most conspicuous from Stachelberg and other points of view to the north, is actually the second in height. The highest summit (3,613 m [11,854 ft]) lies west of the Glarner Tödi, and is distinguished by the Romansh name Piz Russein. Politically, the Tödi is split between the municipalities of Disentis and Sumvitg (Grisons), and Glarus Süd (Glarus).

The central mass of the mountain is enclosed between two glaciers, of which the most considerable is the Biferten Glacier. This glacier originates in a vast snow-basin south-east of the Tödi, bounded to the south by the peaks of Stoc Grond, Piz Urlaun and Bifertenstock, forming the boundary of the two cantons. The last-named peak is connected with the Selbsanft by a massive wall of precipitous rocks enclosing the glacier on the east side, and forcing it, after descending at first nearly due east, to bend round first to north-east, and then due north. On the opposite side a ridge of rocks called Bifertengrätli, descending north-east from the Tödi, forms the boundary of the Biferten Glacier. The end of this nearest the Tödi is the Grünhorn, whereon stood the first hut of the Swiss Alpine Club. The Biferten Glacier is difficult to access, owing to its steepness. It includes some ice-falls, with intermediate steeps, and is much crevassed. On the west side of the Tödi lies the Sand Glacier or Sandfirn, which descends towards the Sand Alp from the dividing ridge forming the pass to the south. This does not extend so far south as the head of the Biferten Glacier. The ridge running due north from the Stoc Grond to the summit of the Tödi overlooks the head of the Val Russein on the Grisons side of the chain, but it appears that the main mass of the Tödi lies altogether on the north side of the watershed.

The 1,570-metre prominence is particularly visible from the Glarus side, where the difference of altitude between the summit and the Linth Valley is almost 3 kilometres (1.9 mi). The difference is smaller on the south side as the Vorderrhein Valley is above 1,000 m (3,300 ft).

== Geology ==
On the south side, the massif of the Tödi is mainly composed of gneiss, which, according to Escher von der Linth, overlies a pioritic granite with large felspar crystals. The summit and the northern flank are mainly composed of metamorphic slate, in which talc predominates, but is sometimes replaced by felspar, so that the rock sometimes approaches the condition of gneiss and sometimes that of mica slate. There are manifest traces of anthracite, especially at the Bifertengrätli, where the rock in some places assumes the appearance of a quartzite mixed with fragment of talc, which has elsewhere in this region been referred to the Verrucano. To these strata succeed dolomite and Jurassic limestone, similar in character to those developed on a large scale in the canton of Glarus.

== Climbing and skiing ==
The first recorded attempts to reach the summit were made by Placidus a Spescha, one of the founders of mountaineering. He was born in 1752 and entered the monastery of Disentis. It was not until 1824 that the peak was climbed, when Placidus a Spescha, accompanied by a servant and two chamois-hunters, made his sixth and final assault from the south side. On the way up they spent a night at the Russein huts and the next day, on 1 September, they climbed to the gap called Porta da Spescha where Placidus and the servant watched the two hunters complete the climb to the top. They were Augustin Bisquolm and Placi Curschellas

On April 19, 1863, the Swiss Alpine Club is founded. Rudolf Theodor Simler became central president, and designated the Tödi and Clariden region as the first area of exploration. A simple shelter was made at the foot of the mountain near the Biferten Glacier, the Grünhorn Hut, which was the first mountain hut of the Swiss Alpine Club.

Europe contains some of the world's largest vertical relief available to mountaineers, including lines that exceed the scale of Himalayan routes. According to Reudi Beglinger, mountain guide and founder of Selkirk Mountain Experience, ski-mountaineering options on the Tödi include what is "generally considered one of the most technically difficult lines in the Alps, almost a 10,000-foot descent".

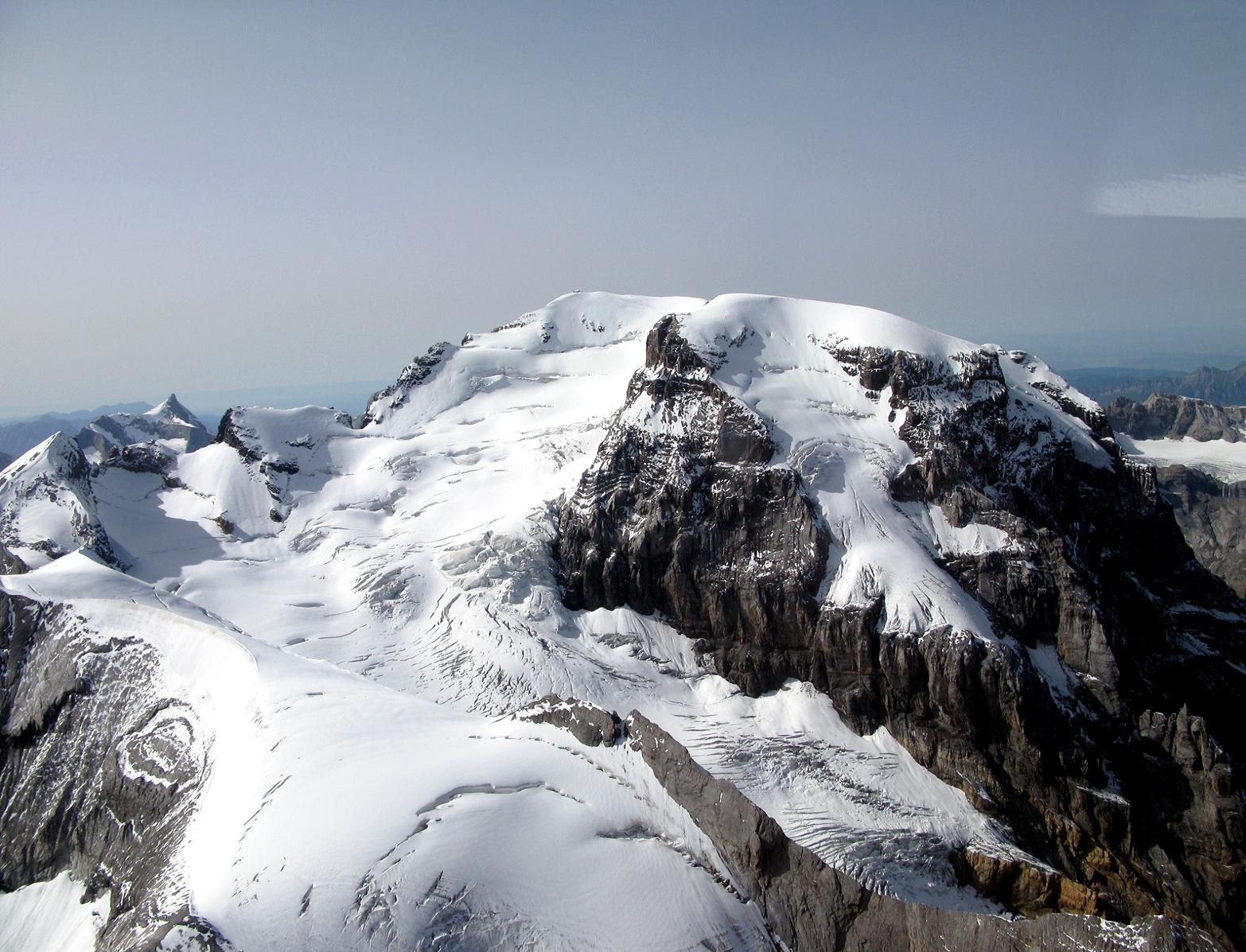
View from the east side

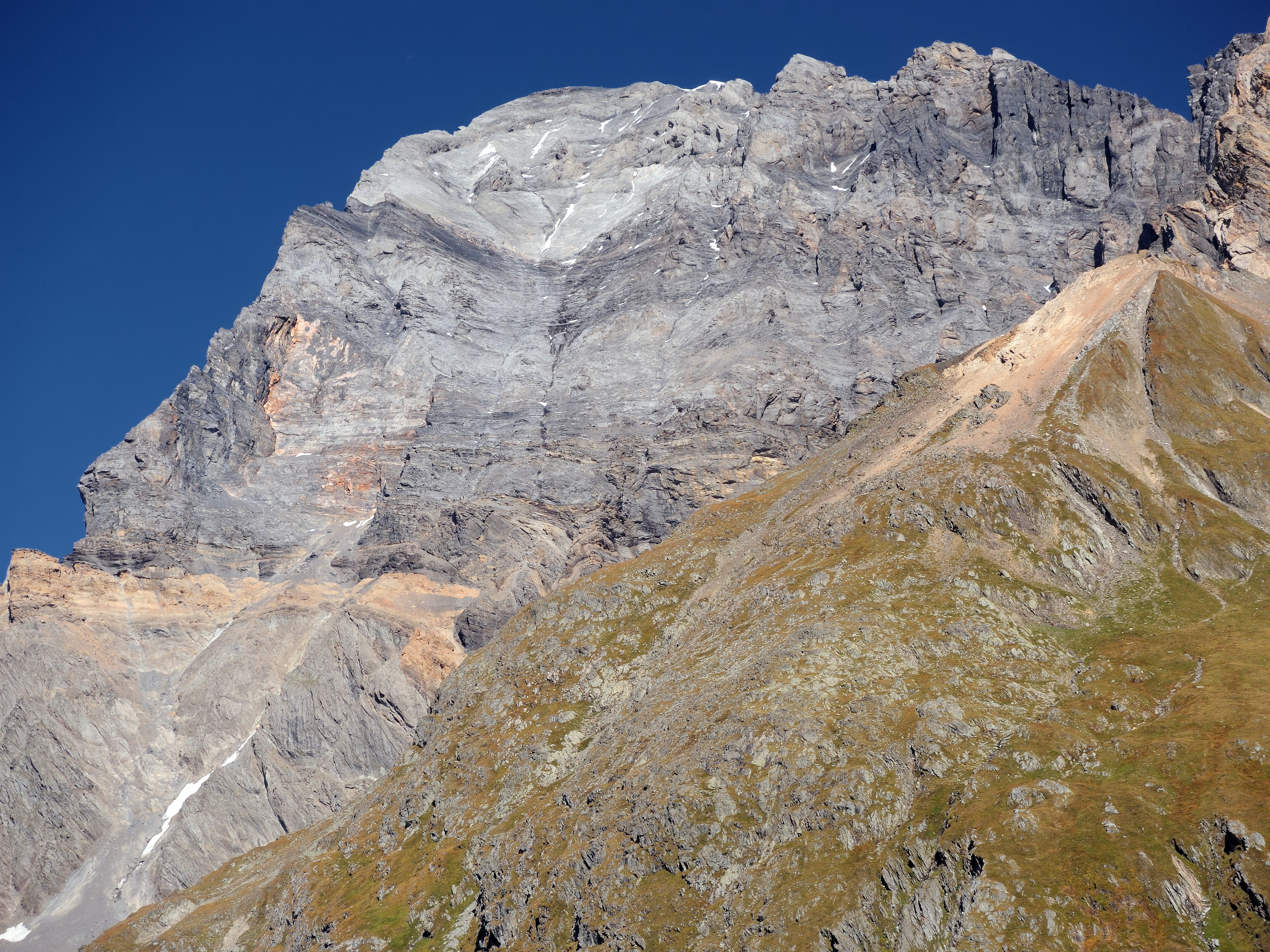
View from the southwest side

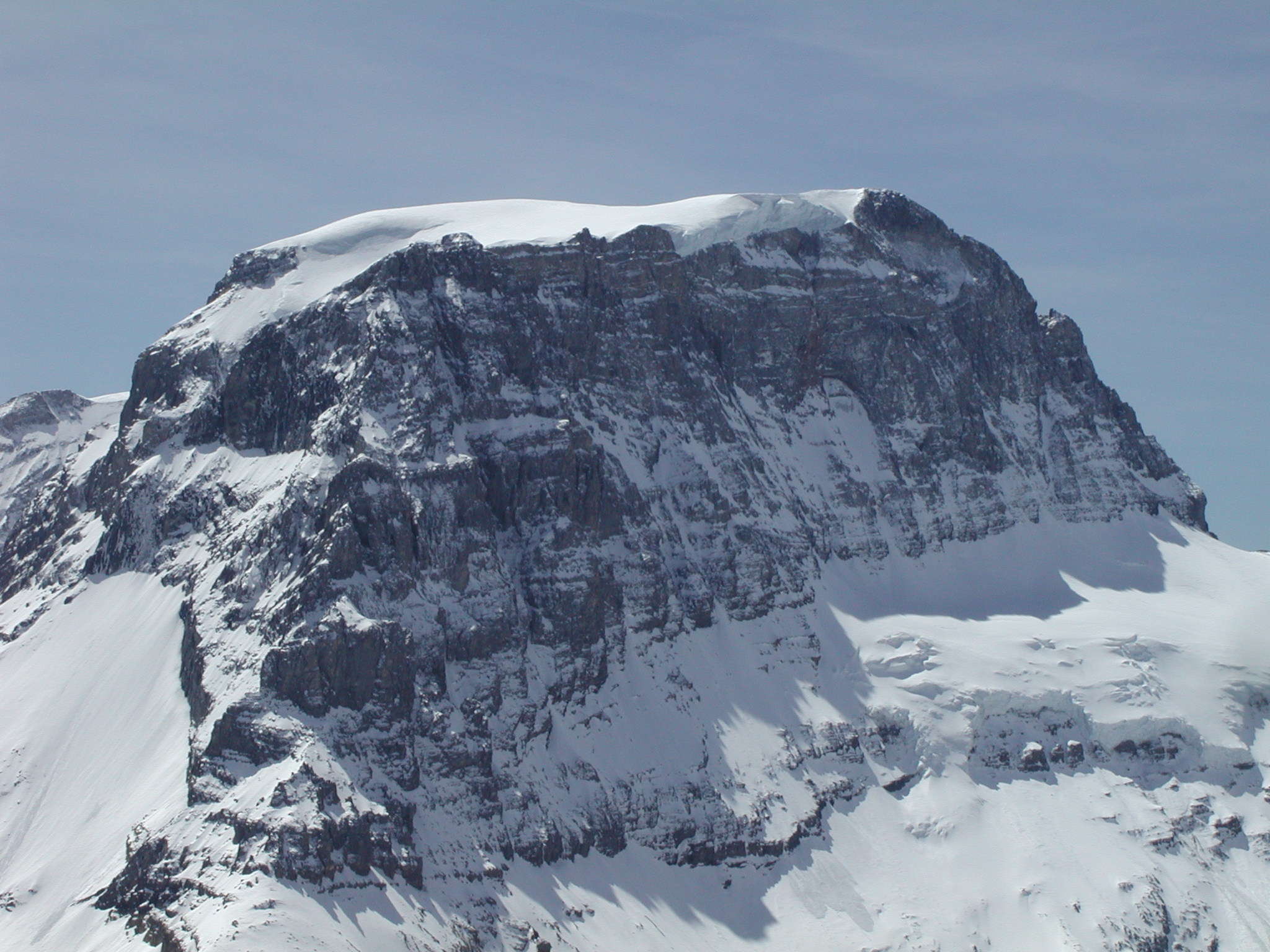
View from the northwest side

== See also ==
- List of mountains of Graubünden
- List of mountains of the canton of Glarus
- List of most isolated mountains of Switzerland
