= Biferten Glacier =

Glacier in Switzerland

Coordinates: 46°48′33″N 8°56′53″E

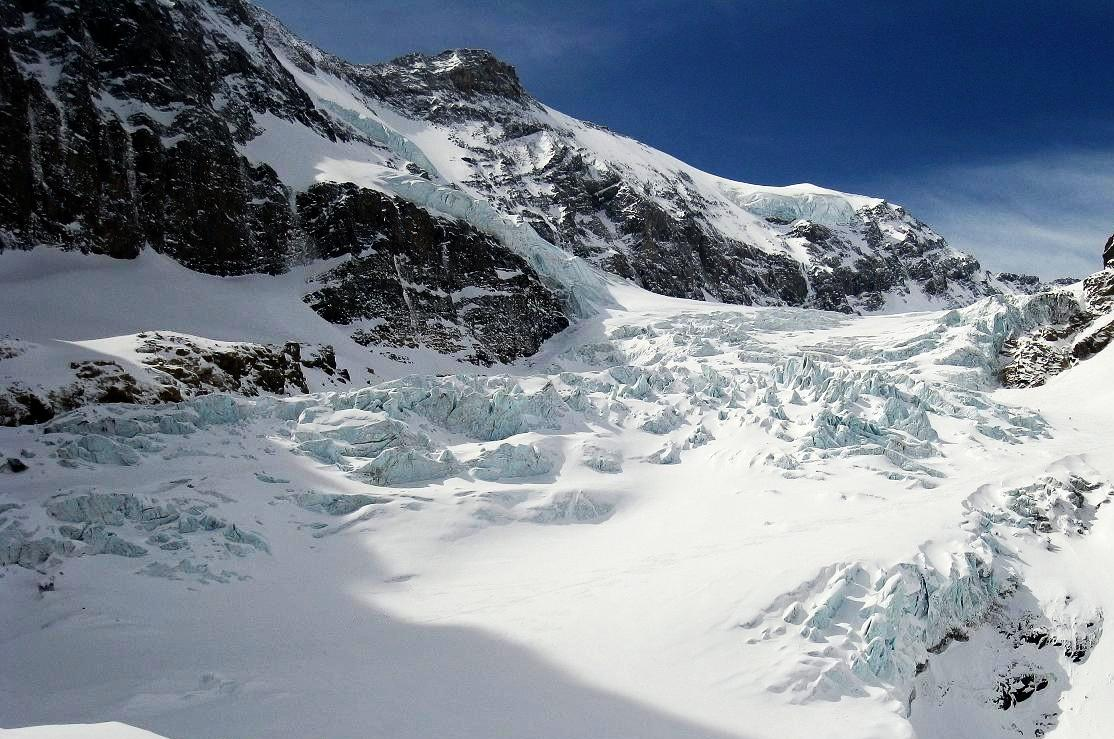
Biferten Glacier

Aerial view of the Biferten Glacier (to the left of the Tödi

The Biferten Glacier (German: Bifertenfirn) is a 4-kilometre-long (2.5 mi) glacier (2005) situated in the Glarus Alps in the canton of Glarus in Switzerland. In 1973 it had an area of 2.81 square kilometres (1.08 sq mi). The glacier is located east of the Tödi.

== See also ==
- List of glaciers in Switzerland
- Swiss Alps
