= Hüfi Glacier =

Glacier in Switzerland

Hüfifirn
- Aerial view of the Hüfi Glacier (2026)
- Interactive map of Hüfifirn
- Location: Uri, Switzerland
- Coordinates: 46°48′29″N 8°50′50″E
- Length: 7 km

The Hüfi Glacier (German: Hüfifirn) is a 7 km (4.3 mi) long glacier (2005) situated in the Glarus Alps in the canton of Uri in Switzerland. In 1973 it had an area of 13.64 km^{2} (5.27 sq mi).

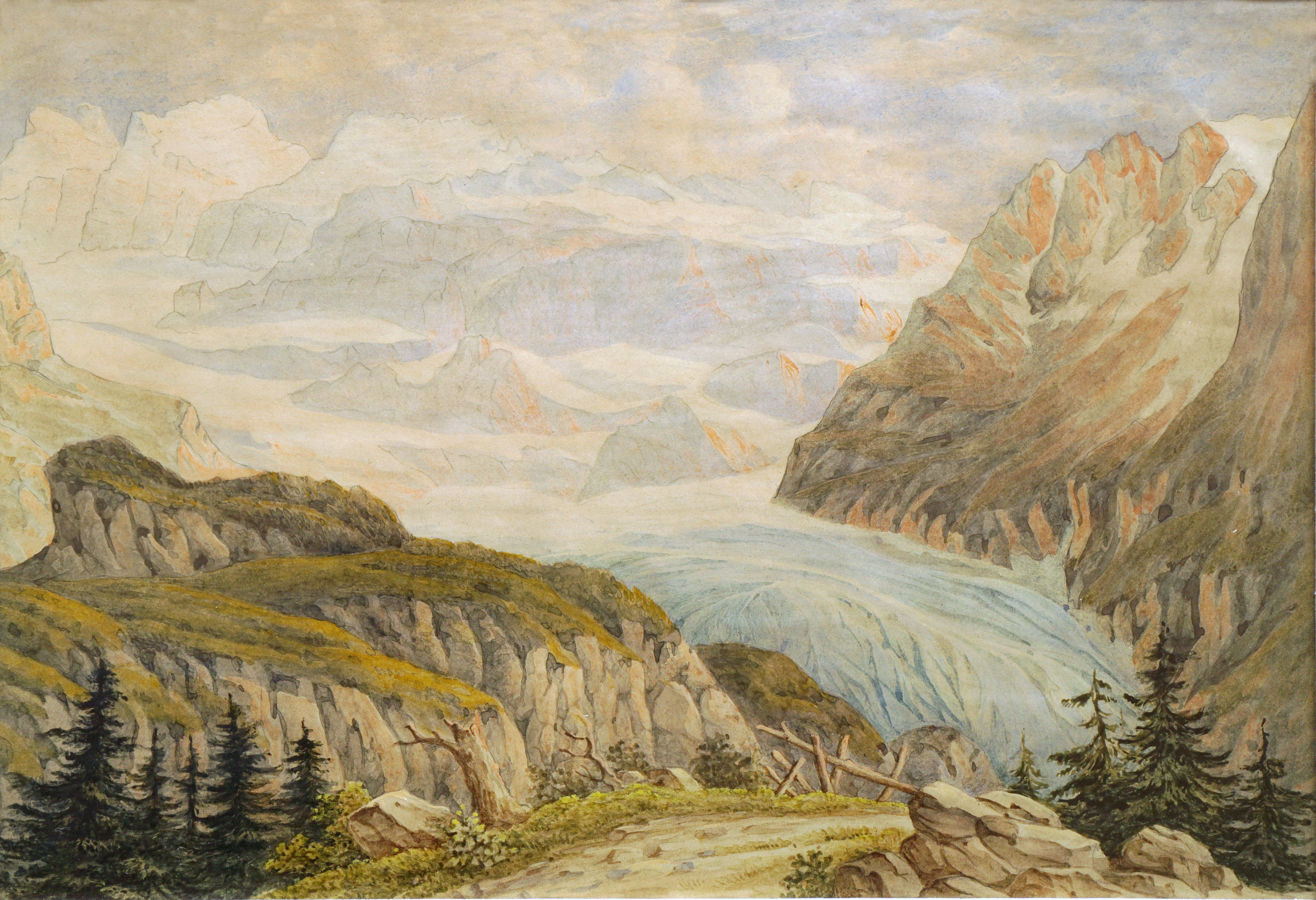
Hüfi Glacier around 1880 by Heinrich Müller

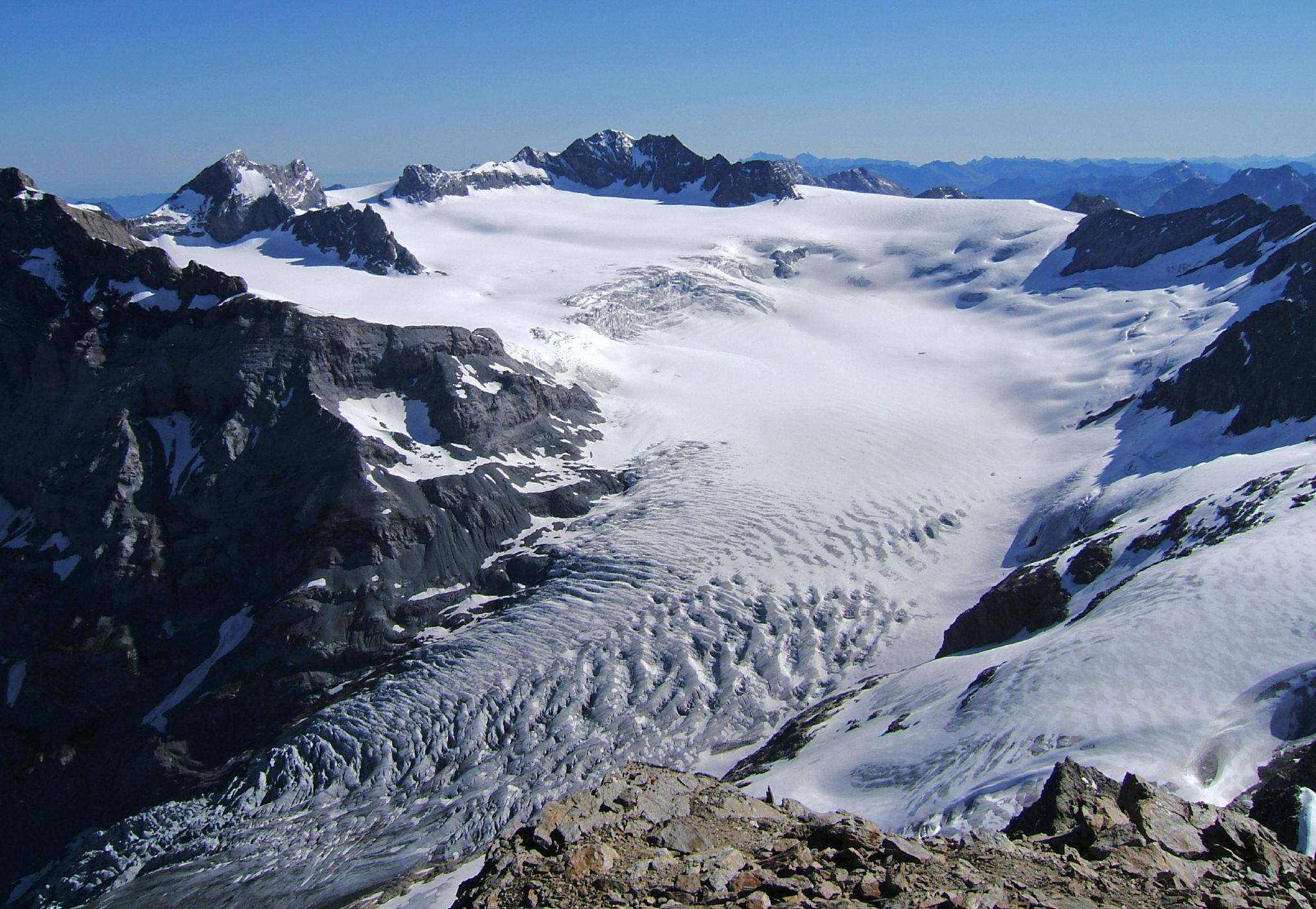
The Hüfi Glacier in 2007; a comparison with the image from 2026 shows the loss of ice mass within a timespan of 19 years

== See also ==
- List of glaciers in Switzerland
- List of glaciers
- Retreat of glaciers since 1850
- Swiss Alps
