= Swisstopo =

Swiss geological survey

Federal Office of Topography (Swisstopo)
- (in German) Bundesamt für Landestopografie (in French) Office fédéral de topographie (in Italian) Ufficio federale di topografia (in Romansh) Uffizi federal da topografia

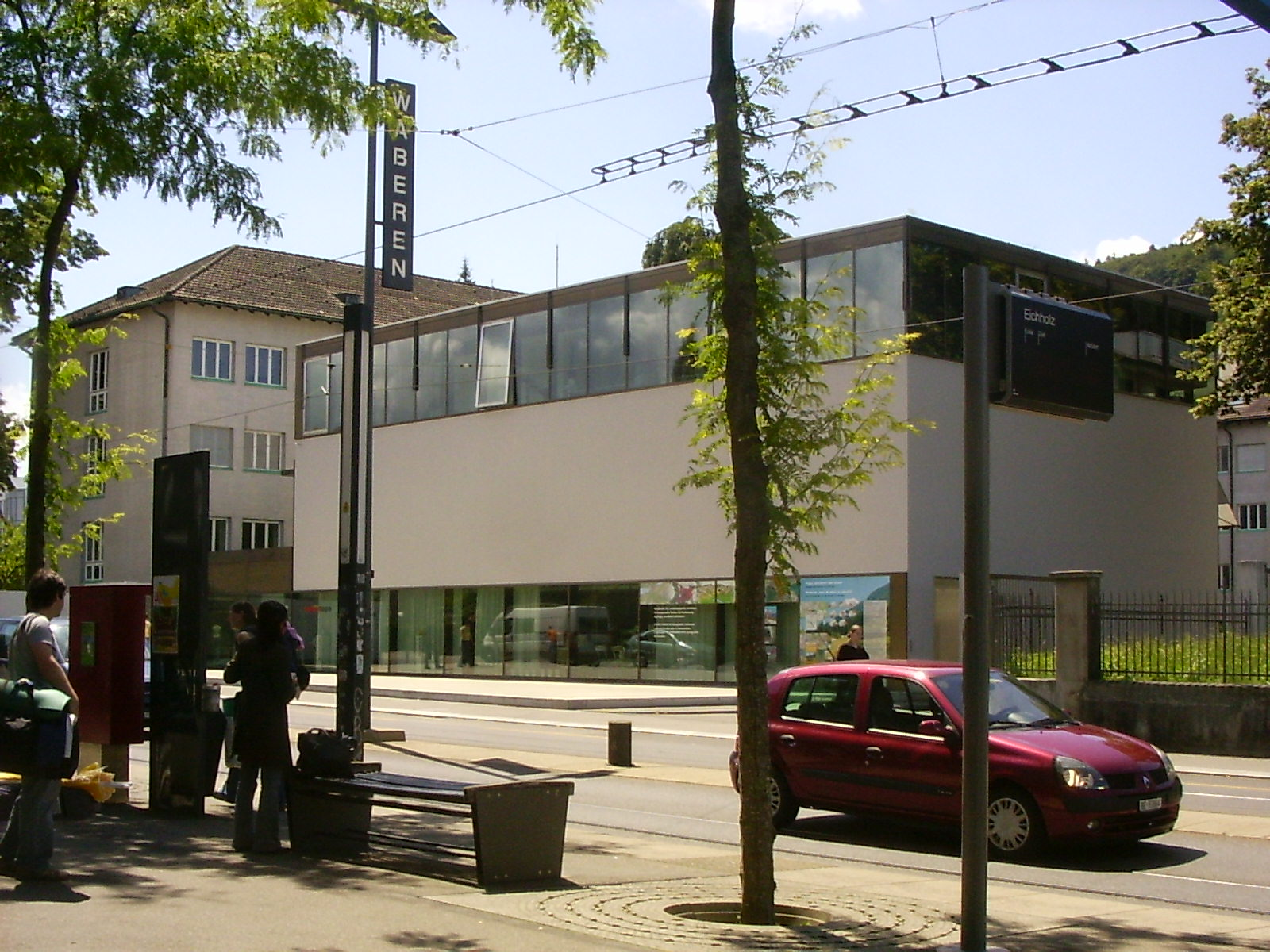
- Building in Wabern.

Agency overview
- Jurisdiction: Federal administration of Switzerland
- Headquarters: Wabern
- Minister responsible: Viola Amherd, Federal Councillor
- Parent agency: Federal Department of Defence, Civil Protection and Sports
- Website: www.swisstopo.admin.ch

Swisstopo is the official name for the Swiss Federal Office of Topography, (Note: German: Bundesamt für Landestopografie, French: Office fédéral de topographie, Italian: Ufficio federale di topografia, Romansh: Uffizi federal da topografia) Switzerland's national mapping agency.

The current name was made official in 2002. It had been used as the domain name for the homepage of the institute since 1997.

== Maps ==
The main class of products produced by Swisstopo are topographical maps on seven different scales. Swiss maps have been praised for their accuracy and quality.

=== Regular maps ===
- 1:25.000. This is the most detailed map, useful for many purposes. Those are popular with tourists, especially for famous areas like Zermatt and St. Moritz. These maps cost CHF 13.50 each (2004). 208 maps on this scale are published at regular intervals. The first map published on this scale was 1125 Chasseral, in 1952. The last map published on this scale was 1292 Maggia, in 1972. Since 1956, composites have been published, starting with 2501 St. Gallen. They have the same information, but consist of several parts of regular maps combined, especially in tourist or urban areas. 22 composite maps have so far (September 2004) been published.
- 1:50.000. Since 1994, routes are coloured on these maps. It is marketed as for hikers, alpinists, cyclists, planners, tourists and explorers. 78 maps on this scale are published at regular intervals. Composites also exist, and are more frequent than the assemblages for 1:25.000 maps. As of September 2004, 24 composite maps have been published.
- 1:100.000. These are marketed as Geographical regions of special interest to tourists on one map. 24 maps on this scale are published at regular intervals. 11 composite maps have also been published.
- 1:200.000. Switzerland and surrounding lands in four sheets (no composite maps).
- 1:300.000. A photographic copy of the 1:200.000 map, with Switzerland on a single sheet.
- 1:500.000. Switzerland with surrounding lands.
- 1:1.000.000. Switzerland with extensive surroundings, from Luxembourg to Bosnia and Herzegovina.

==== Numbering system ====
The numbering system of Swiss regular maps (apart from composites) is directly based on the geographical situation. A map number is always one higher than the map number of the adjacent map to the west, and one lower than the adjacent map to the east. From north to south, the numbers differ by 20 for the scale 1:25.000, 10 for the scale 1:50.000 and 5 for the scale 1:100.000. However, as can be seen on the Seite nicht gefunden, there are some exceptions to this rule: Switzerland is a little bit too large to be only 20 1:25.000 maps wide. Instead of choosing another system, the map to the east of 1199 Scuol is called 1199bis Piz Lad. The same is true for some maps at scale 1:50.000.

=== Tourist maps ===
- Hiking maps are published on the scale 1:50.000. They are based on the regular maps 1:50.000, but include information about which routes are good to walk. They also have information about public transport. These maps are published in collaboration with Swisshiking.
- Ski tour map, 1:50.000. Based on the topographical map 1:50.000, but including information about steep slopes, ski routes and snowboard routes.
- Road map: two sheets published on a scale of 1:200.000, but not the same as the topographical 1:200.000, as it lacks contour lines. This map is published each year.
- Cultural Heritage, 1:300.000
- Map of Museums, 1:300.000.
- Map of Castles, 1:200.000. It is based on the topographical map 1:200.000, but includes information about castles, fortresses and ruins.
- Everest, in collaboration with a lot of other organizations, including the National Geographic Society.
- The Swiss Path is a hiking trail around Lake Uri to celebrate the 700th anniversary of Swiss Confederation.
- Seeland-Trois lacs, 1:75.000, not directly based on any topographical map (e.g. it lacks contour lines). It was made for the Expo. 02 which was in this region.

=== Other maps ===
- Satellite map, 1:300.000.
- Community map, 1:300.000, with only political borders, no topographical information except for lakes.
- Einst und Jetzt (history map; 1:25.000): only Bern and Basel have been published so far.
- Land use map, 1:300.000, with statistical information only (no topographical information)
- Aeronautical map, 1:500.000, based on the topographical map 1:500.000, with aviation information.
- Glider chart (1:300.000)
- Chart of Air Navigation Obstacles (1:100.000)
- Solar Radiation
All scales of the National Map

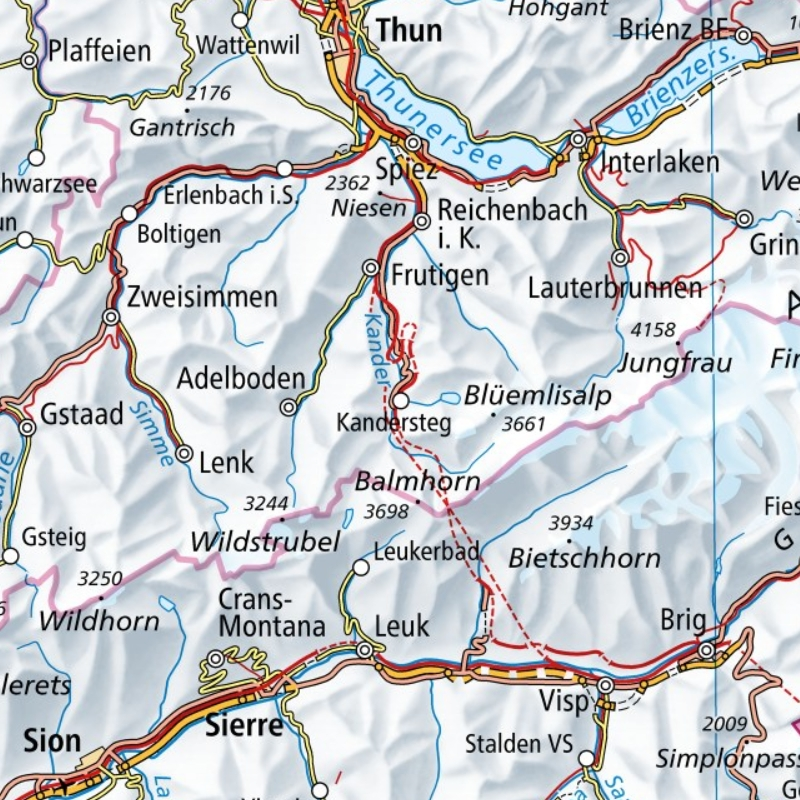
1:1'000'000

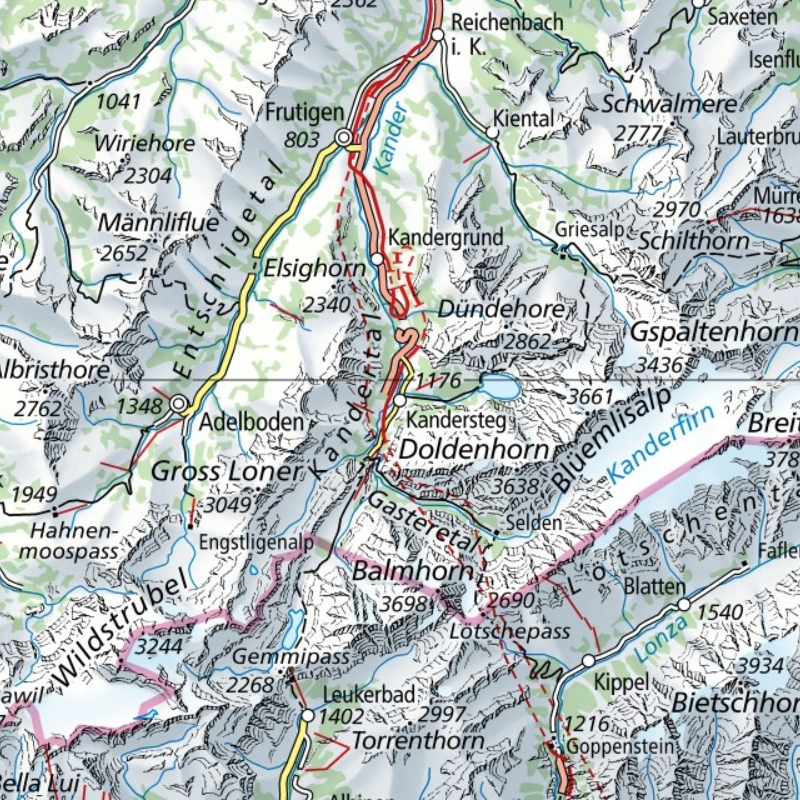
1:500'000

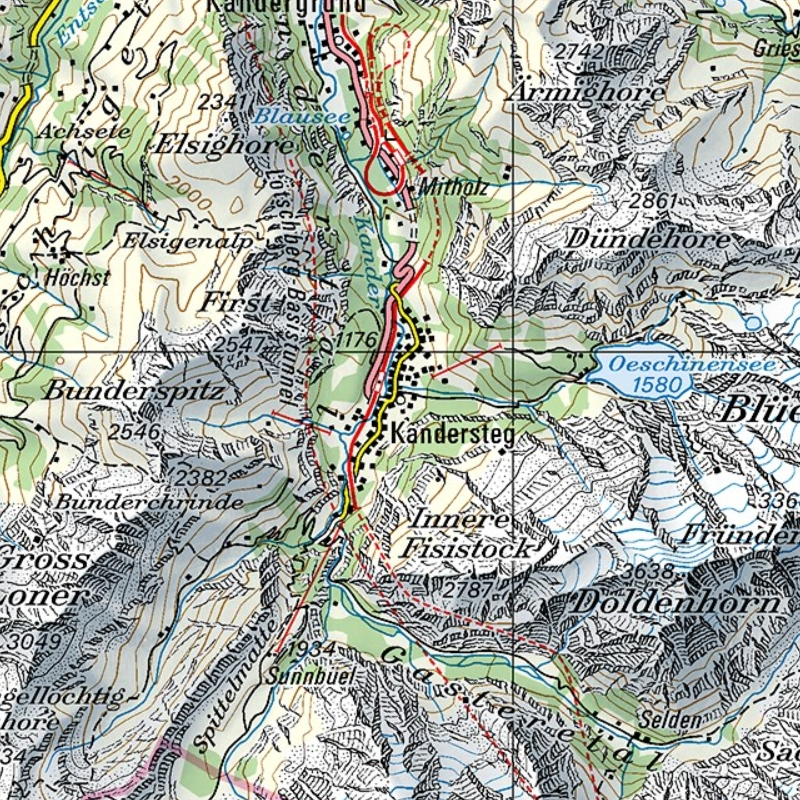
1:200'000

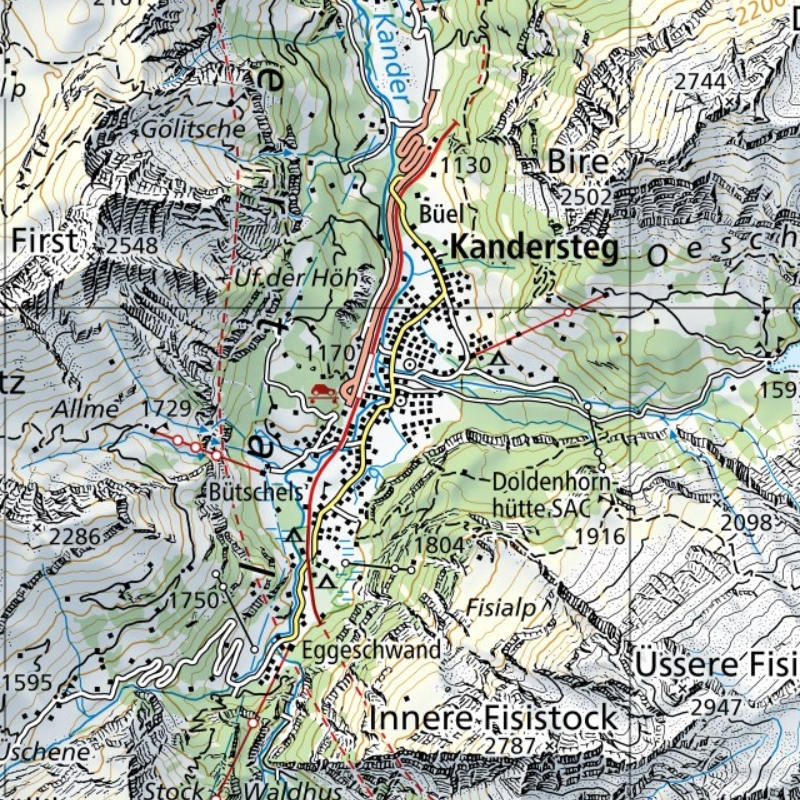
1:100'000

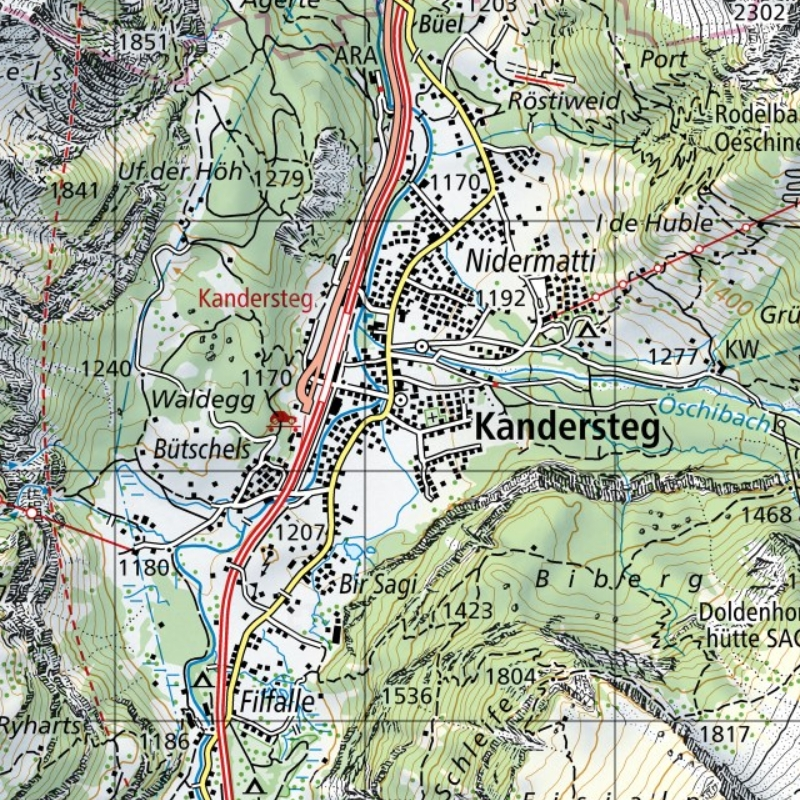
1:50'000

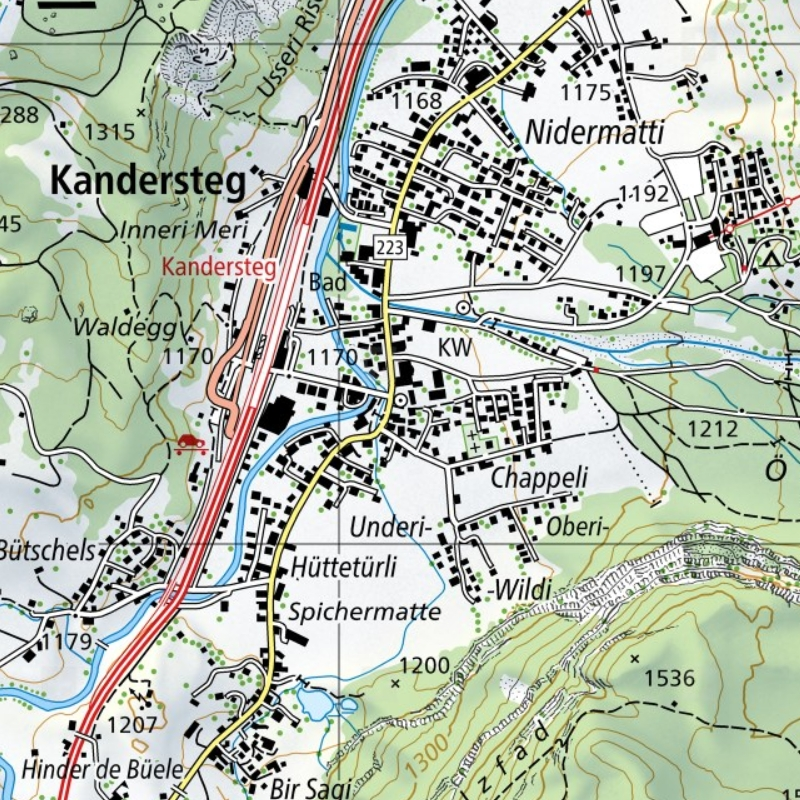
1:25'000

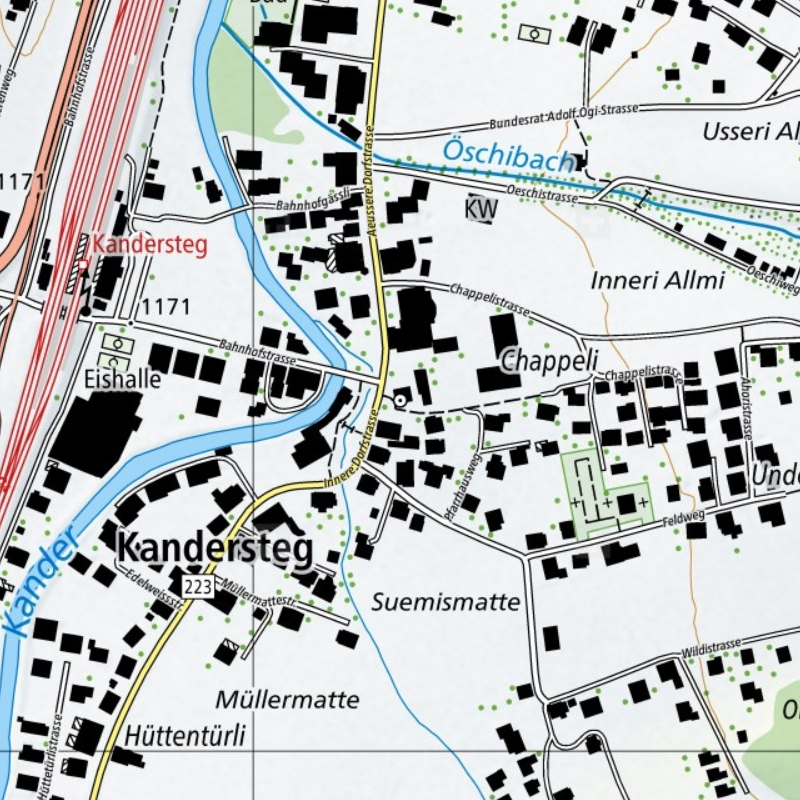
1:10'000

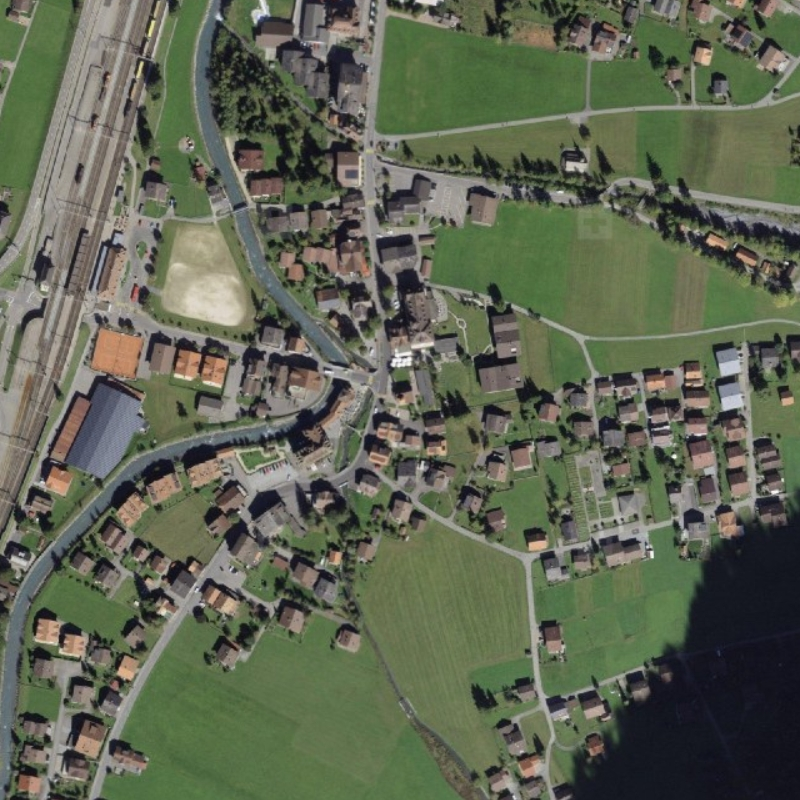
Orthophoto

Maps centered on Kandersteg

== History ==
=== Early work and Dufourkarten ===
In 1809, the first topographical surveys of Switzerland took place on a confederate, military level. They took place in the north-eastern area and were led by Hans Conrad Finsler. Measurements in the alpine region started in 1825 with triangulations by Antoine-Joseph Buchwalder. This work would be finished in 1837 by Johannes Eschmann. At New Year 1838, the Topographical Bureau (Eidgenössisches Topographisches Bureau) was founded in Carouge, Geneve by Guillaume Henri Dufour. This bureau published its first map the same year, the Carte topographique du Canton de Genève. Topographic surveys also started in the alpine regions of Switzerland. These had their first results in 1845, a year later than planned, when a map scaled 1:100.000 was published. This was the start of what are termed Dufourkarten (Dufour's Maps). The topographic survey finished in 1862. To honour Dufour, the Swiss government decided to rename the highest peak on the Dufourkarten from Höchste Spitze to Dufourspitze: it still carries that name today. In 1863, the SAC published a 1:50.000 map of the region Tödi, based on unpublished survey material. A year later, the last map of the Dufourkarten was published, and the following year, Dufour retired and Hermann Siegfried became Chief of the Topographical Bureau.

=== Siegfriedkarten ===
In 1865, Herman Siegfried becomes the Chief of the Topographical Bureau, and the bureau moves from Geneva to Bern. Over the next few years, a composite map is published of Ticino, soundings start to measure the depth of the major Swiss lakes, and a first map is published scaled 1:250.000. In 1868, a Federal Act is passed to enforce the continuation of the initial topographic surveys, as well as the publication of the results. This results in new topographical surveys in 1869 and the publication of the first 13 Siegfriedkarten (1:25.000 and 1:50.000) in 1870. In 1878, a 1:1.000.000 map is published, and the next year, the height of the Pierre du Niton is measured to be 376.86 metre. In 1880, Herman Siegfried is succeeded by Jules Dumur.

In 1895, the Topographical surveys for the Siegfriedkarten are finished. As of 1901, 581 sheets of the Siegfriedkarten have been published, with only a few individual more maps to come (there would be 604 maps in 1926). On old maps of the modern series, a reference to those maps can still be found: until the 1970s, the Siegfriedkarte was the best scale available for some areas of Switzerland, and therefore used by climbers and other alpinists. The printing of the Siegfriedkarten would continue until 1952.

=== New century ===
In 1887, the first maps with relief shading are published. In 1889, a photographic studio is appended to the bureau. In the years after 1894, a wall-map for schools is published, in response to a request from the parliament to do so. In 1898, the soundings of the major Swiss lakes are finished. In 1901, the bureau is moved into an independent division within the military, and the name Eidgenössische Landestopographie becomes customary, a name still used by some people until today, and a name which can be found on some older maps. Hermann Kümmerly publishes a relief wall-map for schools in the same year. In 1908, map trials are started to serve as a replacement for the Dufourkarten. Two years later, trials start to replace the Siegfriedkarten. Much of this military work would remain secret for many years. In 1913, 1922 and 1924, trials are done with aerial photogrammetry, first with balloons and later with aircraft, but only as of 1930 this is used for production of maps, and in 1940 terrestrial photogrammetry is abandoned.

=== Modern maps ===
One of the 1:25'000 sheets of the national map (1285 Les Diablerets), showing various terrain types

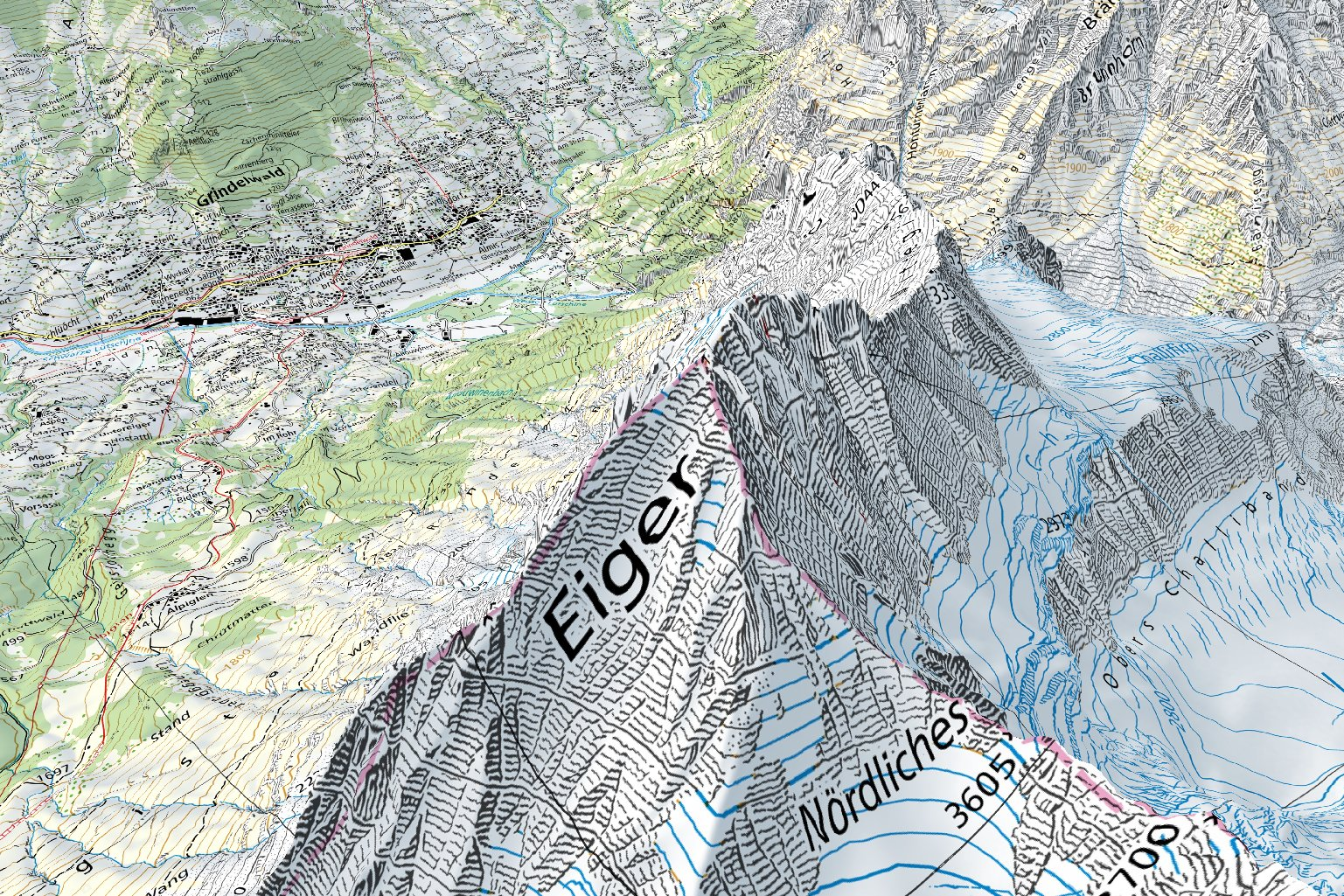
Screen capture of the geographical portal, showing a 3D rendering of the 1:25'000 map

On 21 June 1935, a Federal Act was passed on the production of the new National Map series, ranging in scale from 1:25.000 to 1:1.000.000. Because of the political situation in Europe, work was started on the 1:50.000 maps. For this purpose, a 'M18d' Messerschmitt was bought for aerial photography, the first aircraft owned by the Eidgenössischie Landestopographie. In 1938, the first 1:50.000 map was published: 263 Wildstrubel. From 1939 to 1945, all sales were suspended because of World War II. In 1939, the Eidgenössische Landestopographie also procured its first vehicle.

The first 1:25:000 map, 1145 Bielersee, was published in 1952. The last 1:25.000 map, 1292 Maggia, was published in 1979. This marked the finish of the lowest-scale mapping of Switzerland. The first composite in this scale, 2501 St. Gallen, was published in 1956.

The 1:50.000 series was completed in 1963 with 285 Domodossola. With the publication of this map, the Siegfriedkarten have been entirely replaced. The first composite on this scale, 5001 Gotthard, was published in 1954.

The 1:100.000 series started with 41 Col du Pillon (1954), and finished with 47 Monte Rosa in 1965. With this publication, the Dufourkarten have been entirely replaced.

The 1:200.000 series started with No. 3 in 1971 and finished with No. 4 in 1976.

The maps on the scales 1:500.000 and 1:1.000.000 were respectively first published in 1965 and 1994. With the publication of the latter map, the work required by the Federal Act of 1935 was finally finished.

Since 1951, different sorts of leisure maps have been published by the Federal Office of Topography. See above for a list of those.

In 1958, the coordinate system of the maps was changed. Before 1958, the centre of the coordinate system, Bern, had coordinates (0, 0). Subsequently, it has coordinates (600, 200). This was done so that any coordinate is either an x-coordinate or a y-coordinate: this prevents confusion about the order of the coordinates.

In 1968, the name officially became Eidgenössische Landestopographie instead of Abteilung für Landestopographie, although this had been common practice for decades. The English name remained unchanged (Topographical Survey of Switzerland).

In 1979, the Eidgenössische Landestopographie was renamed to the current name Bundesamt für Landestopographie. See above for the names in other languages. Since 2002, the international name Swisstopo has been used. This name had already been used since the website www.swisstopo.ch went online in 1997.

== Peculiarities ==
Some maps produced by Swisstopo scarcely have any Switzerland on it. This is especially true for the scales 1:100.000 and 1:50.000. As can be seen here, the map 45 Haute Savoie only has a very little spot of Switzerland on it, in the extreme north-western corner. The same is true for the 1:50.000 map 285 Domodossola. In both cases, no 1:25.000 maps have been published for the corresponding part of the 1:50.000 map: at the 1:25.000 scale, some maps are a tiny bit larger than others, to be able to get all of Switzerland onto a map without the need of maps with less than 0.1% domestic territory on it.

Initially, the plan was to be more generous also for 1:25.000 maps. Thirty-one maps were once planned, most of which did not have a single square kilometer of Switzerland on it, that were never published. Some of them (1158 Zeinisjoch) were up to ten kilometers away from the Swiss border. On old Swiss maps, one can still see the Blattübersicht were those are signified as planned maps.

Some maps have been published in the past, but have been discontinued, also because they lack any part of Switzerland. 1035 Friedrichshafen is an example of that. When one looks at the Mapsheet Index Northeast, there is no map to the east or to the north of 1055 Romanshorn. However, when one then looks at the area of 1055 Romanshorn, it can be seen that these maps do in fact exist, but do not have any Swiss land on the map.

== Full-time positions since 2007 ==
Raw data

Source: "Federal Finance Administration FFA: Data portal".

== See also ==
- Geography of Switzerland
