= Hangsackgrat =

Mountain in Switzerland

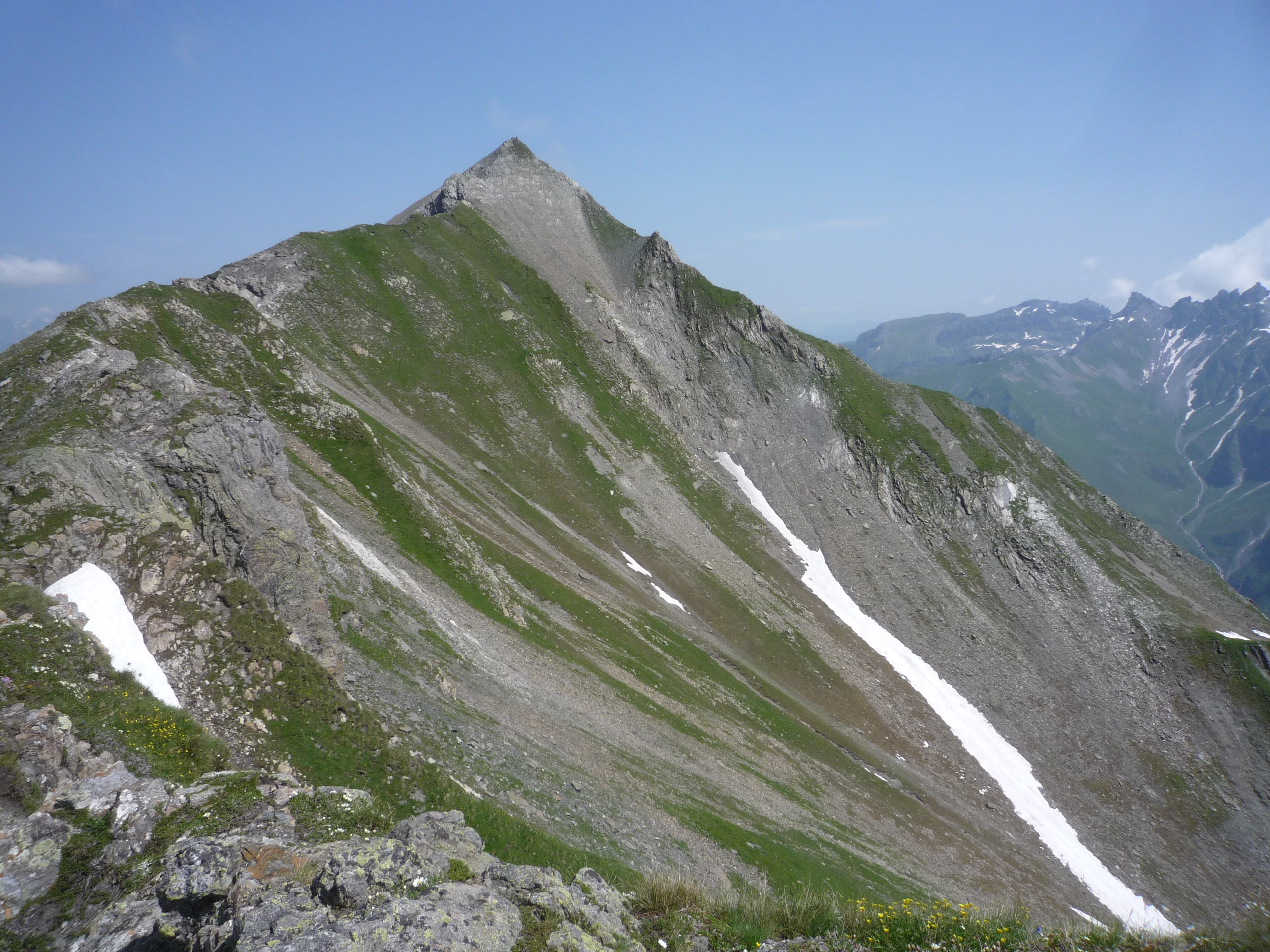

Highest point
- Elevation: 2,634 m (8,642 ft)
- Prominence: 196 m (643 ft)
- Parent peak: Ringelspitz
- Coordinates: 46°57′9″N 9°19′18.5″E

Geography
- Location within Switzerland Location within Canton of St. Gallen
- Location: St. Gallen
- Country: Switzerland
- Parent range: Glarus Alps

The Hangsackgrat (2,634 m [8,642 ft]) is a mountain of the Glarus Alps, located south of Weisstannen in the canton of St. Gallen. It lies on the range east of Piz Sardona, that separates the Weisstannental from the Calfeisental.

== See also ==
- List of mountains of the canton of St. Gallen
