= Sazmartinshorn =

Mountain in Switzerland

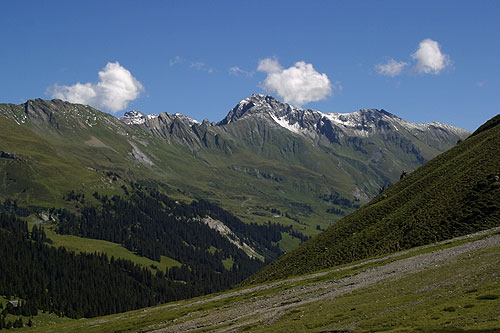
- The Sazmartinshorn (centre) from the Calfeisental

Highest point
- Elevation: 2,827 m (9,275 ft)
- Prominence: 239 m (784 ft)
- Parent peak: Pizol
- Coordinates: 46°56′38″N 9°22′33″E

Geography
- Location within Switzerland Location within Canton of St. Gallen
- Location: St. Gallen
- Country: Switzerland
- Parent range: Glarus Alps

The Sazmartinshorn (2,827 m [9,275 ft]) is a mountain of the Glarus Alps, overlooking St. Martin and the lake of Gigerwald in the canton of St. Gallen, Switzerland. It lies on the range east of Piz Sardona, that separates the Weisstannental from the Calfeisental.

After the Pizol, the Sazmartinshorn is the second highest mountain lying entirely within the canton of St. Gallen.

== See also ==
- List of mountains of the canton of St. Gallen
