= Hochfinsler =

Mountain in Switzerland

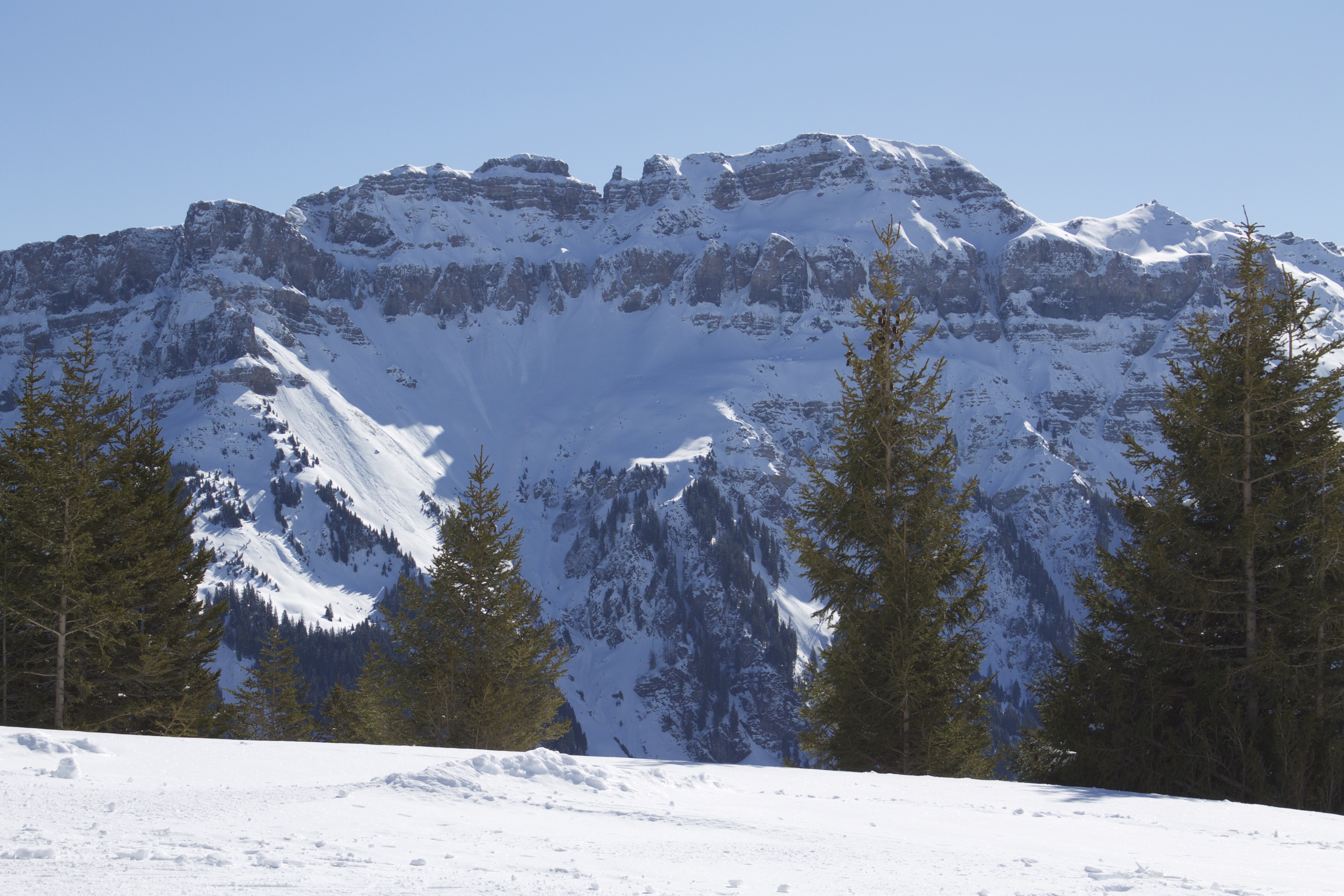

Highest point
- Elevation: 2,423 m (7,949 ft)
- Prominence: 231 m (758 ft)
- Parent peak: Magerrain
- Coordinates: 47°2′2.5″N 9°18′0″E

Geography
- Location within Switzerland Location within Canton of St. Gallen
- Location: St. Gallen
- Country: Switzerland
- Parent range: Glarus Alps

The Hochfinsler (2,423 m [7,949 ft]) is a mountain of the Glarus Alps, located south of Flums in the canton of St. Gallen. It lies on the range north of the Wissgandstöckli, that separates the Schilstal from the Weisstannental.

== See also ==
- List of mountains of the canton of St. Gallen
