= Bützistock =

Mountain in Switzerland

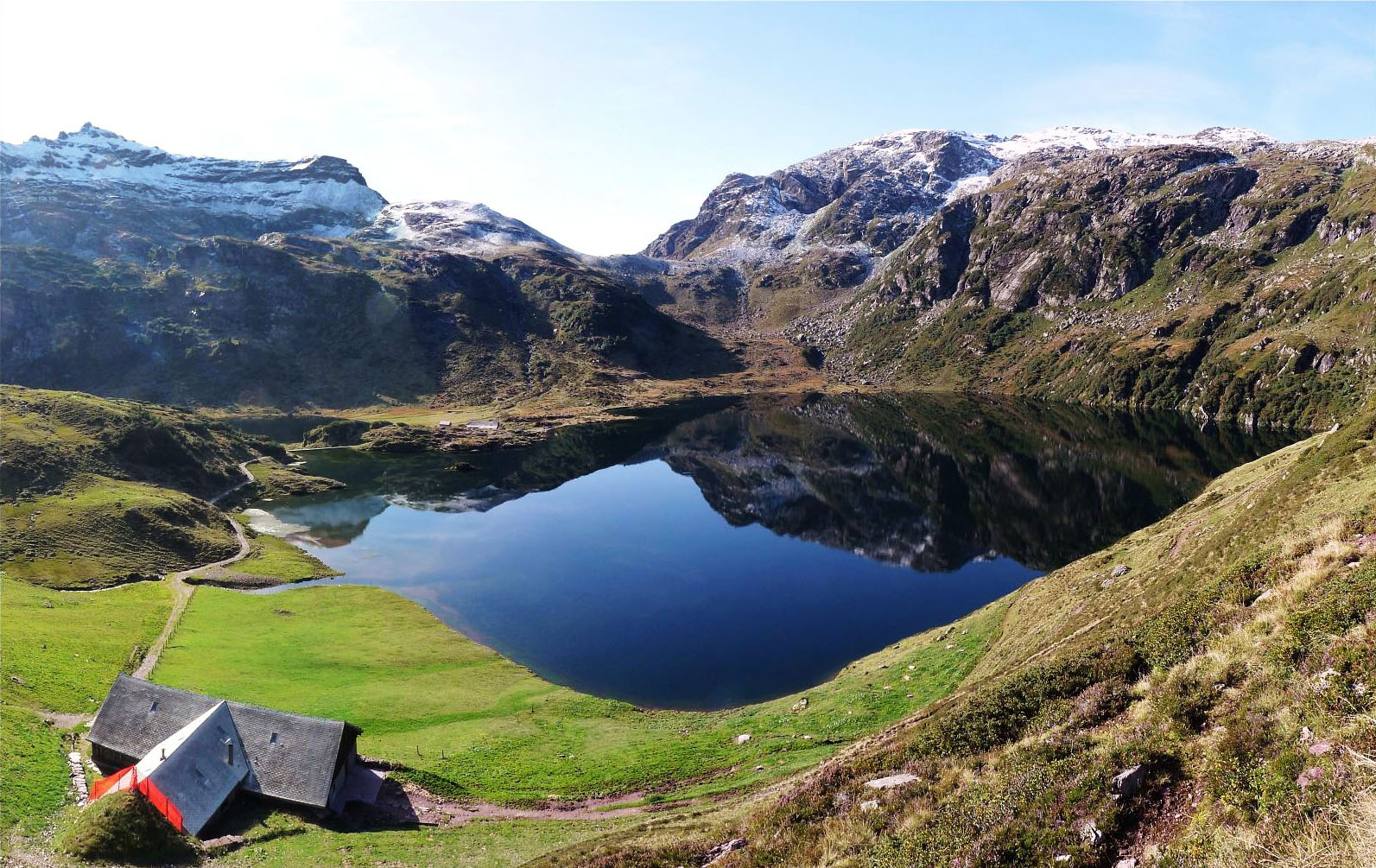
- The Bützistock (left summit) from the Murgsee

Highest point
- Elevation: 2,496 m (8,189 ft)
- Prominence: 261 m (856 ft)
- Parent peak: Magerrain
- Coordinates: 47°01′44″N 9°10′30.8″E

Geography
- Location within Switzerland Location within Canton of Glarus Location within Canton of St. Gallen
- Location: Glarus/St. Gallen
- Country: Switzerland
- Parent range: Glarus Alps

The Bützistock is a mountain of the Glarus Alps. It lies on the border between the cantons of Glarus and St. Gallen in Eastern Switzerland. The top is 2,496 metres (8,189 ft) above sea level or 513 metres (1,683 ft) above the surrounding terrain. The width at the base is 18 kilometres (11 mi).

The terrain around Bützistock is mainly mountainous, but the nearest surrounding area is hilly. The highest point nearby is Piz Sardona, at 3,056 m (10,026 ft) above sea level, 13 km (8.1 mi) south of Bützistock. The closest locality is Engi on the southern side.

== Climate ==
The area around Bützistock consists mainly of grassland. Around Bützistock, it is quite sparsely populated, with 38 inhabitants per square kilometer. Tundra climate prevails in the area. The annual average temperature in the area is −1 °C (30 °F). The warmest month is July, when the average temperature is 10 °C (50 °F), and the coldest is January, with −12 °C (10 °F). The average annual precipitation for the area is 1,929 mm (75.9 in). The rainiest month is November, with an average rainfall of 246 mm (9.7 in), and the driest is March, with 78 mm (3.1 in).

== See also ==
- List of mountains of the canton of Glarus
- List of mountains of the canton of St. Gallen
