= Tristelhorn =

Mountain of the Glarus Alps, Switzerland

- Piz da Sterls
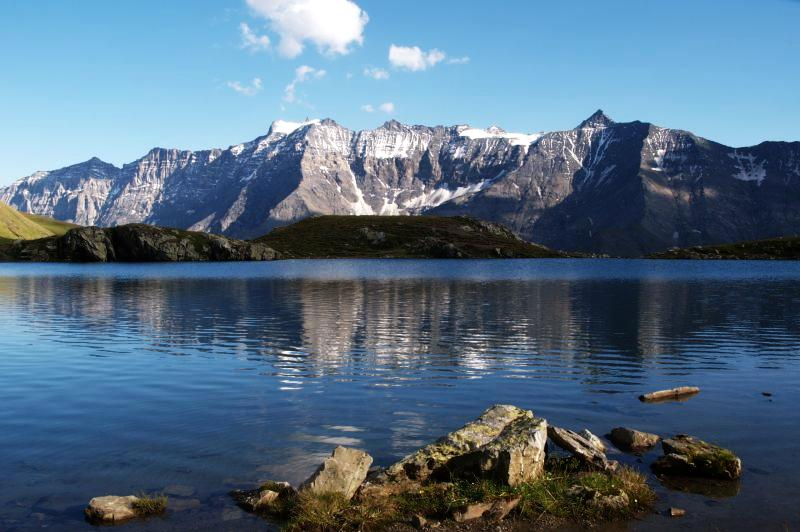
- Ringelspitz (centre left) and Tristelhorn (right) from the north side at Plattenseeli (lake)

Highest point
- Elevation: 3,114 m (10,217 ft)
- Prominence: 109 m (358 ft)
- Parent peak: Ringelspitz
- Coordinates: 46°54′6″N 9°19′0″E

Geography
- Location within Switzerland Location within Canton of Grisons Location within Canton of St. Gallen
- Location: Grisons/St. Gallen
- Country: Switzerland
- Parent range: Glarus Alps

The Tristelhorn (also known as Piz da Sterls) is a mountain of the Glarus Alps, located on the border between the Swiss cantons of St. Gallen and Grisons (Graubünden). Reaching a height of 3,114 metres (10,217 ft) above sea level, it is one of the highest summits in the canton of St. Gallen.

The Tristelhorn is located west of the Ringelspitz, on the range separating the Calfeisen valley (St. Gallen) from the Alpine Rhine Valley near Flims (Grisons).

== See also ==
- List of mountains of the canton of St. Gallen
