= Luzia Tschirky =

Swiss television journalist

Luzia Tschirky (born 1990 in Sargans, Kanton St. Gallen) is a Swiss television journalist. She reports for the Swiss radio and television (Schweizer Radio und Fernsehen (SRF)) from Russia and the post-soviet states. In 2021 she was elected "Swiss journalist of the year".

== Live ==
Her surname Tschirky is traced back to the former municipality Weisstannen, near Sargans. Tschirky first tried journalism during her time at Kantonsschule Sargans. She studied political science at the University of Zurich between 2010 and 2015. She held an honorary position in the board of "jung jurnalists of switzerland" (Junge Journalisten Schweiz) and founded in 2011 the "Jugendmedientage Schweiz", which she organised for three years. 2012 she worked for the swiss editorial office of 3sat. In 2014 she started the project "Medienfrauen Schweiz" (women in media Switzerland). Also in 2014 Tschirky, who speaks not only german and englisch but also russian, worked in the russian office of "Spiegel" and the Russian editorial office of "Radio Free Europe" (a program financed by the american government) in Prague.

In the time following, she had internships and worked as a freelancer at SRF. An important event in her career was her work as reporter for SRF during the Euromaidan in Kiew in 2013. In March 2012 Tschirky started a two year journalism training with SRF. In spring of 2019 she became the first female correspondent for Russia and the former UdSSR.
