= Zanaihorn =

Mountain in Switzerland

- Location within Switzerland Location within Canton of St. Gallen

Highest point
- Elevation: 2,821 m (9,255 ft)
- Prominence: 148 m (486 ft)
- Parent peak: Pizol
- Coordinates: 46°56′51.5″N 9°24′18.2″E

Geography
- Location: St. Gallen
- Country: Switzerland
- Parent range: Glarus Alps

The Zanaihorn (2,821 m [9,255 ft]) is a mountain of the Glarus Alps, located north of Vättis in the canton of St. Gallen, Switzerland. It lies on the range east of the Pizol, between the valleys of the Zanaibach and the Tersolbach.

== See also ==
- List of mountains of the canton of St. Gallen
