= Fahnenstock =

Mountain in Switzerland

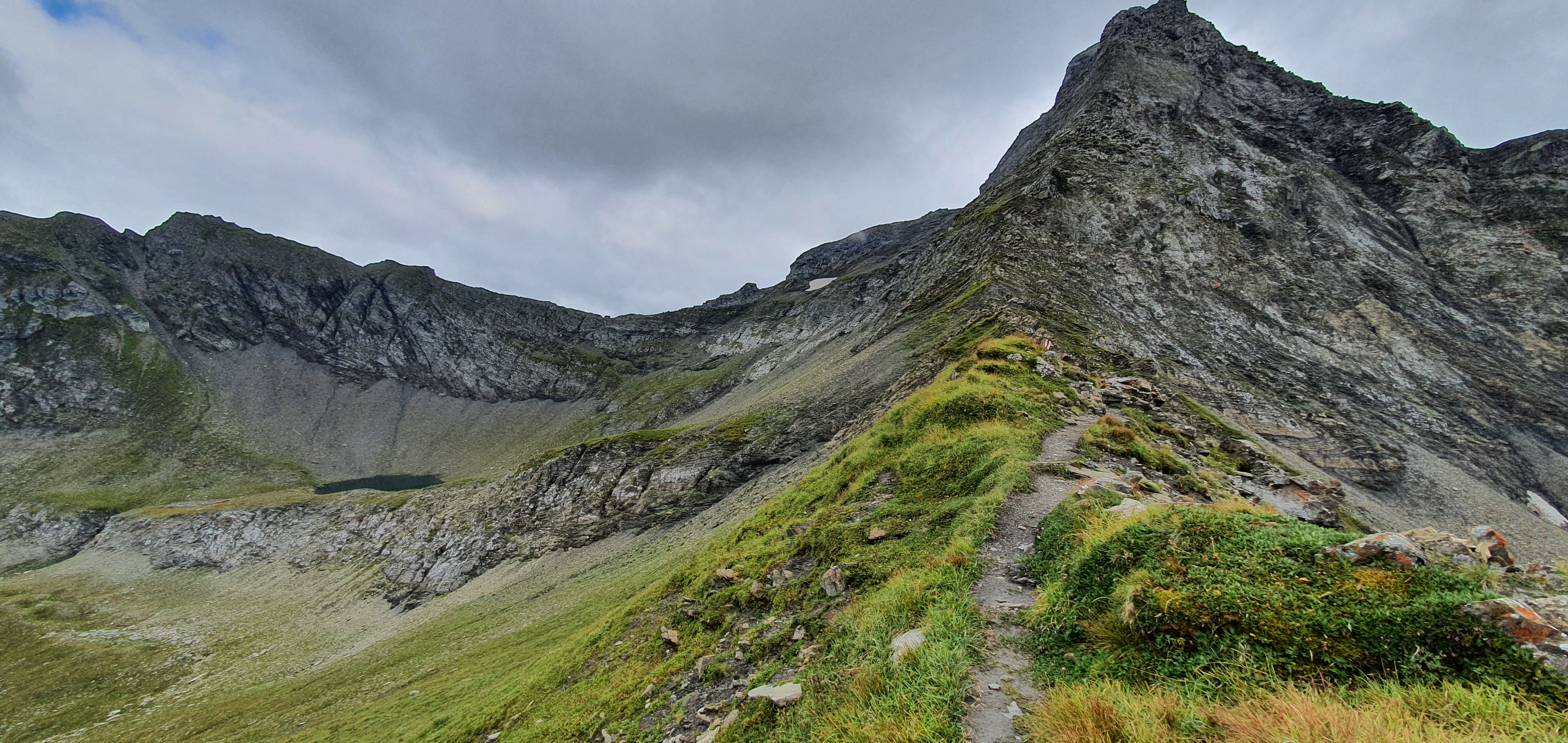

Highest point
- Elevation: 2,612 m (8,570 ft)
- Prominence: 107 m (351 ft)
- Coordinates: 46°56′32″N 9°17′35″E

Geography
- Location within Switzerland Location within Canton of St. Gallen
- Location: St. Gallen
- Country: Switzerland
- Parent range: Glarus Alps

The Fahnenstock (2,612 m [8,570 ft]) is a mountain of the Glarus Alps, located south of Weisstannen in the canton of St. Gallen, Switzerland.

It lies a few kilometres northeast to the tripoint between the cantons of St. Gallen, Glarus and Grisons.

== See also ==
- List of mountains of the canton of St. Gallen
