= Wissgandstöckli =

Mountain in Switzerland

- Location within Switzerland Location within Canton of Glarus Location within Canton of St. Gallen

Highest point
- Elevation: 2,488 m (8,163 ft)
- Prominence: 282 m (925 ft)
- Parent peak: Magerrain
- Coordinates: 46°59′42.5″N 9°14′59.6″E

Geography
- Location: Glarus/St. Gallen, Switzerland
- Parent range: Glarus Alps

The Wissgandstöckli is a mountain of the Glarus Alps, located on the border between the Swiss cantons of Glarus and St. Gallen. It lies approximately halfway between Matt and Weisstannen.

The Riseten Pass lies to the south of the Wissgandstöckli, and carries a hiking trail between Weisstannen, in the canton of St. Gallen, and Matt, in the canton of Glarus.

== See also ==
- List of mountains of the canton of Glarus
- List of mountains of the canton of St. Gallen
