= Spitzmeilen =

Mountain in Switzerland

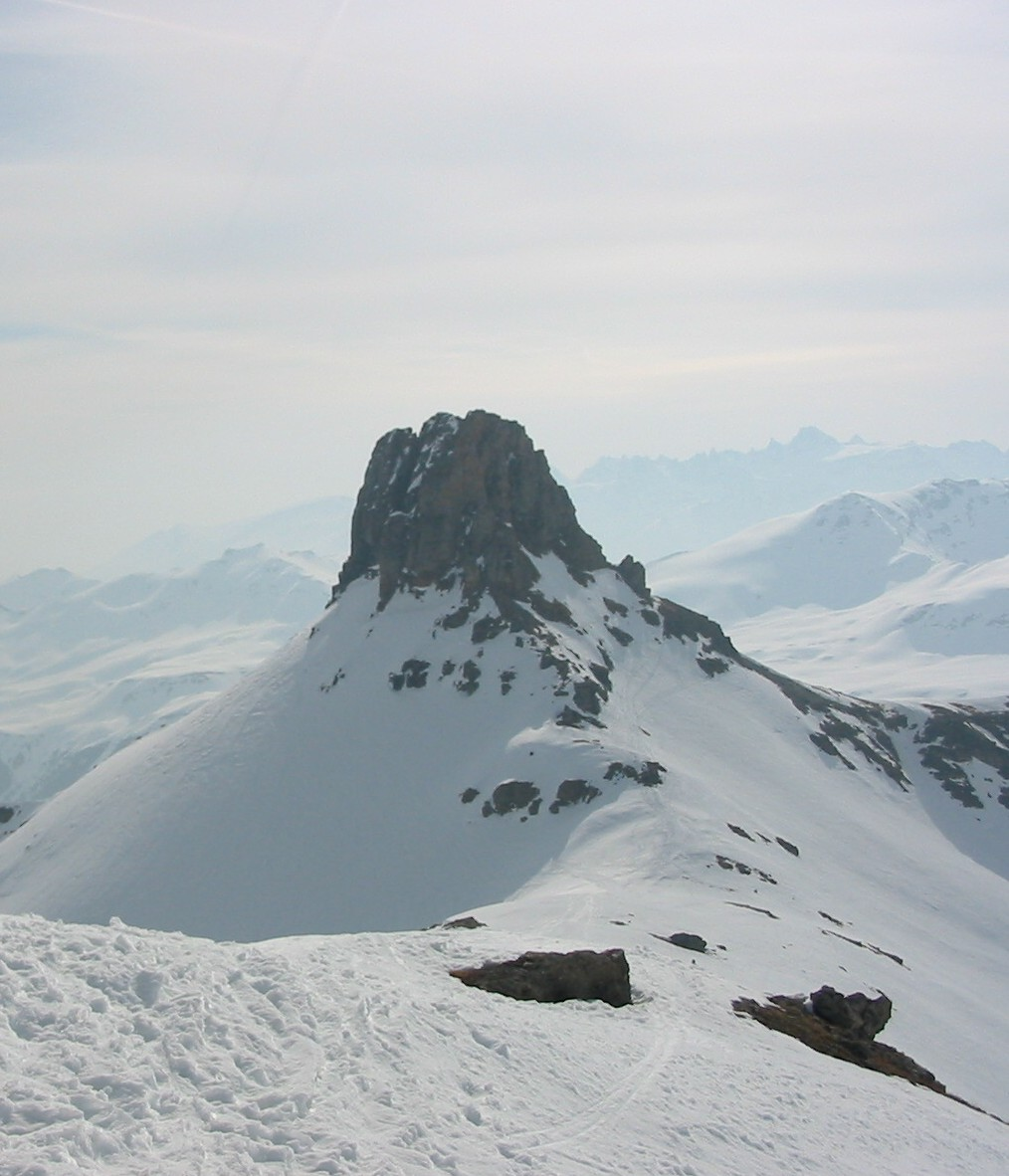
- Spitzmeilen as seen from the northwest

Highest point
- Elevation: 2,501 m (8,205 ft)
- Prominence: 86 m (282 ft)
- Parent peak: Magerrain
- Coordinates: 47°1′26.5″N 9°14′11″E

Geography
- Location within Switzerland Location within Canton of Glarus Location within Canton of St. Gallen
- Location: Glarus/St. Gallen
- Country: Switzerland
- Parent range: Glarus Alps

The Spitzmeilen is a mountain of the Glarus Alps, lying on the border between the Swiss cantons of Glarus and St. Gallen. It lies between the valleys of Schilstal and Sernftal.

== See also ==
- List of mountains of the canton of Glarus
- List of mountains of the canton of St. Gallen
