= Kunkels Pass =

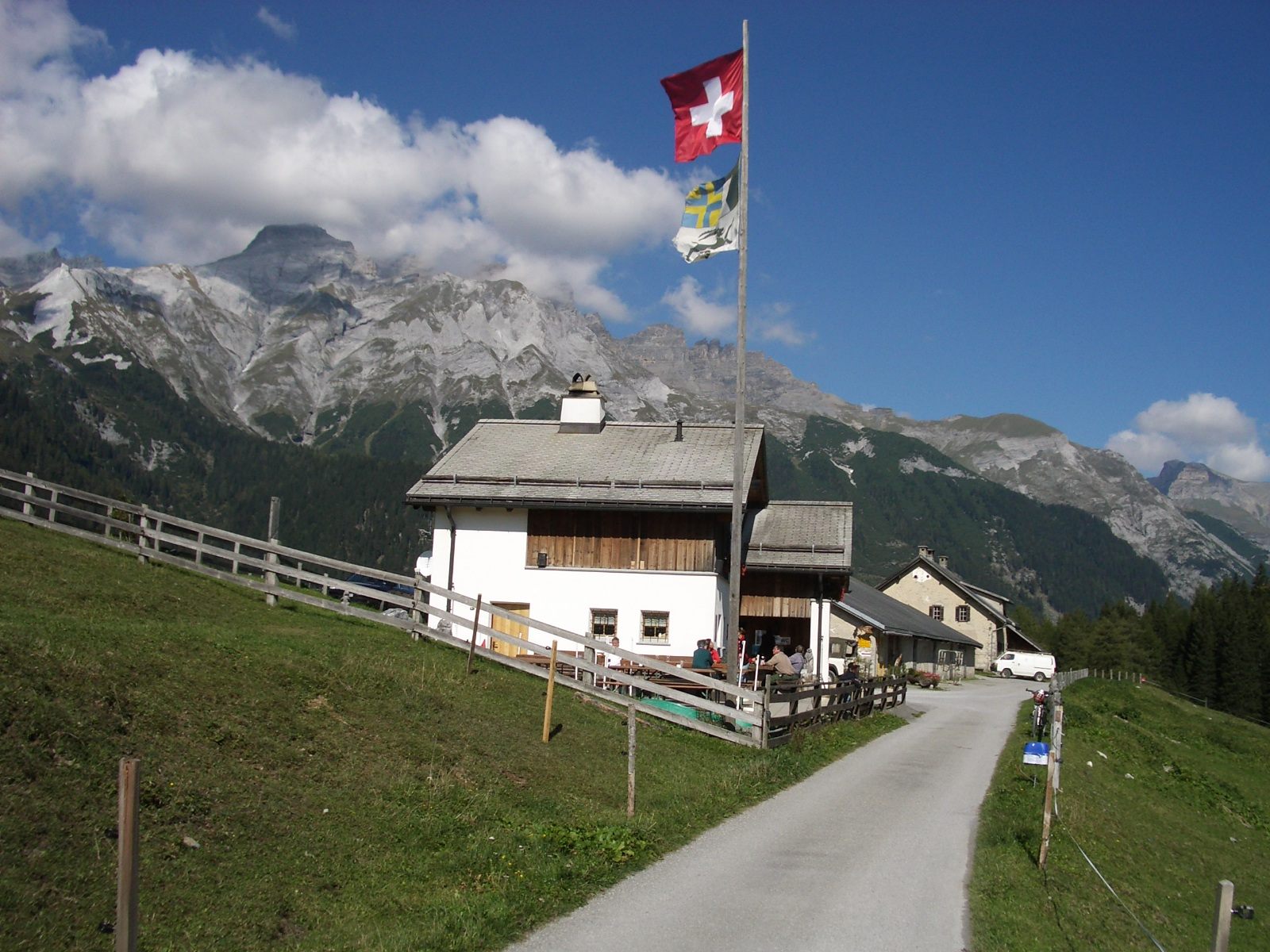

- Location within Switzerland
- Elevation: 1,357 metres (4,452 ft)
- Traversed by: Road

Third Approach
- Location: Graubünden, Switzerland
- Range: Glarus Alps
- Coordinates: 46°51′22″N 9°24′42″E

The Kunkels Pass (German: Kunkelspass) (el. 1,357 m) is a mountain pass in Eastern Switzerland across the Glarus Alps. It connects Vättis in the canton of St. Gallen to Tamins in the canton of Graubünden. The pass itself is located south of the hamlet of Kunkels within Graubünden. The Kunkels Pass is traversed by a small road.

The pass is overlooked by the Ringelspitz and by the Calanda.
