= Calanda (mountain) =

Mountain in Switzerland

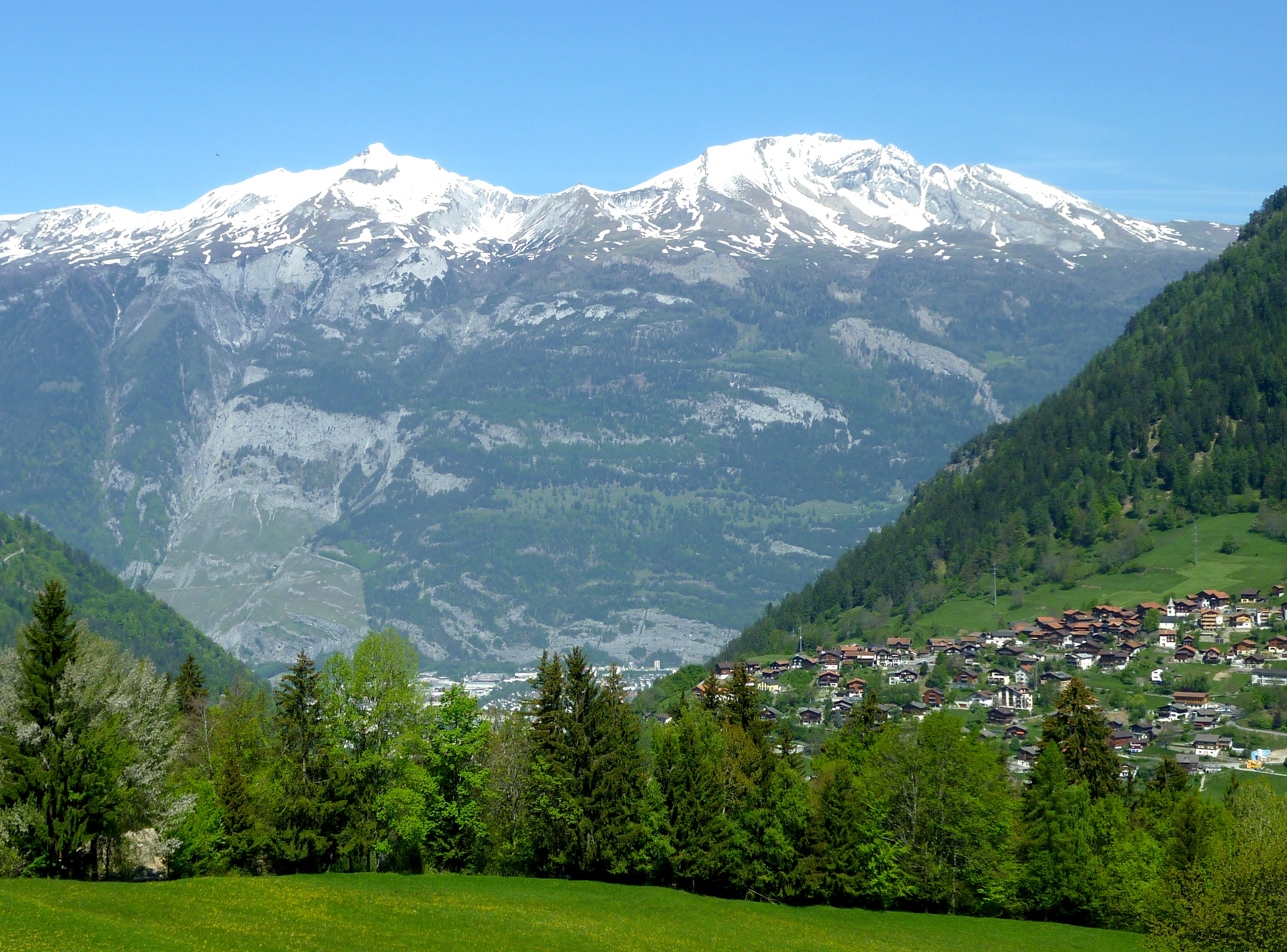
- Felsberger (left) and Haldensteiner (right) Calanda, seen from Maladers

Highest point
- Elevation: 2,805 m (9,203 ft)
- Prominence: 1,448 m (4,751 ft)
- Coordinates: 46°53′59.5″N 9°28′02.5″E

Geography
- Location within Switzerland Location within Canton of Grisons Location within Canton of St. Gallen
- Location: Grisons/St. Gallen
- Country: Switzerland
- Parent range: Glarus Alps

Climbing
- Easiest route: Hike from Calanda hut (Calandahütte)

The Calanda is a mountain (more precisely, a massif) in the Glarus Alps with two main peaks: Haldensteiner Calanda (2,805 m [9,203 ft]) and Felsberger Calanda (2,697 m [8,848 ft]), both located on the border between the cantons of St. Gallen and the Grisons (Graubünden) in eastern Switzerland. It looms over Chur, the capital city of the Grisons.

Although Felsberger Calanda's topographic prominence is 286 metres (938 ft)—enough for it to possibly be considered a mountain in its own right—the massif is commonly said to be one mountain with several peaks. The Calanda lies between the valleys of the Alpine Rhine (to the southeast) and the Tamina (to the northwest). It is separated from the Ringelspitz by the Kunkels Pass. Calanda's secondary peaks are called Rossfallenspitz and Güllenchopf, whereas Berger Calanda and Taminser Calanda are less prominent points that mark the ends of the main ridge.

The shallow southeastern slopes lie in the Grisons, within the municipalities of Mastrils, Untervaz, Haldenstein, Felsberg and Tamins, whereas most of the steeper slopes on the northwest lie in the Canton of St. Gallen, in the municipality of Pfäfers.

On the northerly plateau of Felsberger Calanda, ibexes are regularly seen.

At Felsberg, the locally produced wine is called Goldene Sonne ("Golden Sun"), a reminder of a gold mine in the southern face of Calanda.

== Name ==
The name Calanda derives from the Latin "calare", roughly meaning "to roll down", which refers to the ever-moving southern face that can be seen at Felsberg and is still an active rock slide.

== Hiking ==
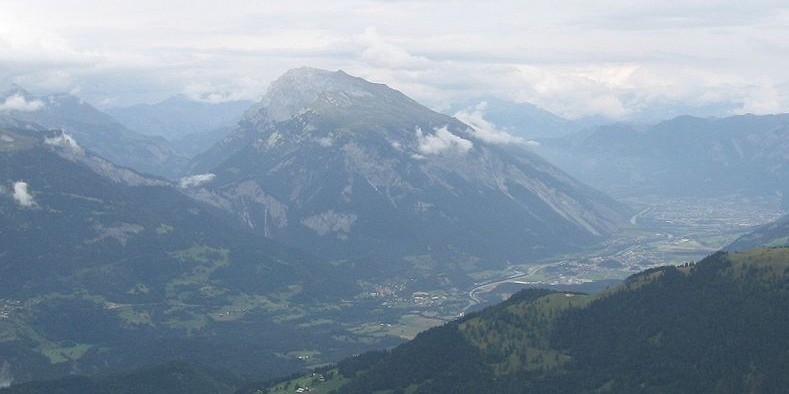
The Calanda as seen from the southwest with the Kunkels Pass on the left and the Rhine and Chur on the right

A Swiss Alpine Club (SAC) mountain hut, the Calandahütte, sits on slopes below Haldensteiner Calanda, at an elevation of 2,073 m (6,801 ft). The two main summits can be reached from the south by hiking: Haldensteiner Calanda by a route rated T3 on the SAC Hiking Scale, and Felsberger Calanda by a T4 route, which requires more experience in route finding and a head for heights to a certain degree.

== See also ==
- List of mountains of Graubünden
- List of mountains of the canton of St. Gallen
