= Wilkethöchi =

Mountain in Switzerland

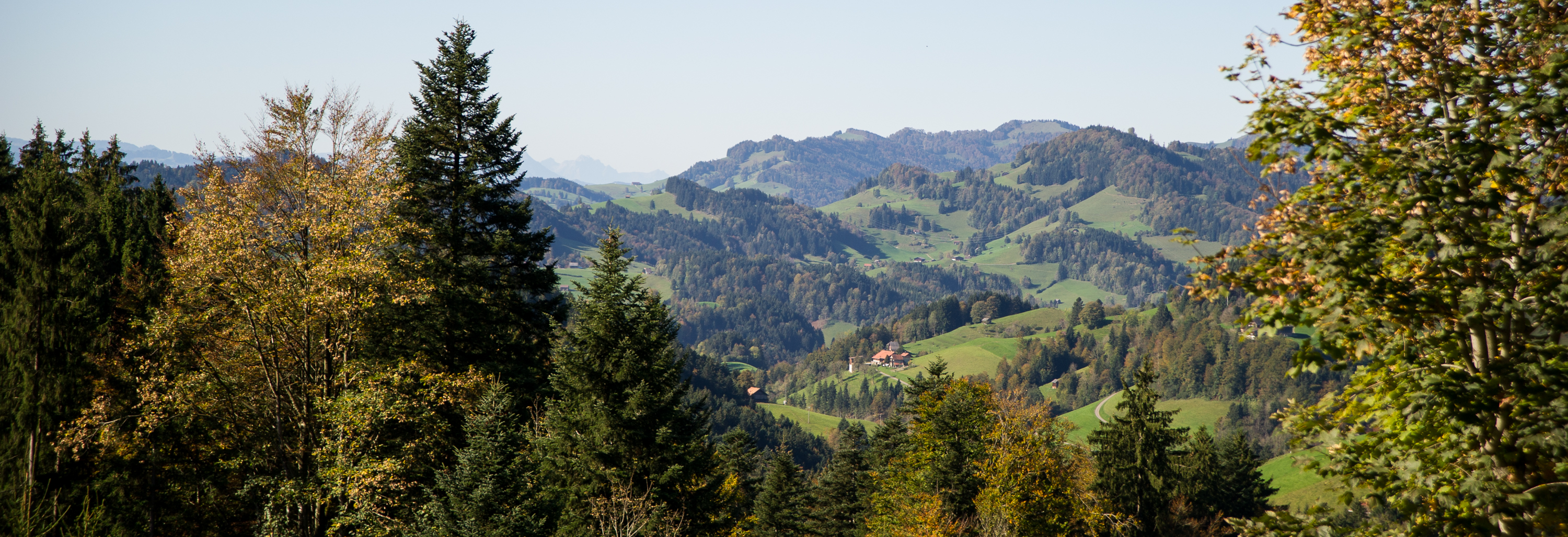
- Wilkethöchi (first peak on the right)

Highest point
- Elevation: 1,172 m (3,845 ft)
- Prominence: 310 m (1,020 ft)
- Parent peak: Hochalp
- Coordinates: 47°20′18″N 9°10′30″E

Geography
- Location within Switzerland Location within Canton of St. Gallen
- Location: St. Gallen
- Country: Switzerland
- Parent range: Appenzell Alps

The Wilkethöchi, or simply Wilket (1,172 m [3,845 ft]), is a mountain of the Appenzell Alps, overlooking Dicken in the canton of St. Gallen.

== Hiking ==
A T1 hiking trail leads to its summit, making it an easily accessible destination for hikers. It is part of the Necki Route 1, which connects Mogelsberg, Ebersol, Wimpfel, and Dicken, with the nearest mountain hut, Grillhütte Aeuel, located 1,589 metres (5,213 ft) east of the summit.

== See also ==
- List of mountains of the canton of St. Gallen
