= List of mountains of the canton of St. Gallen =

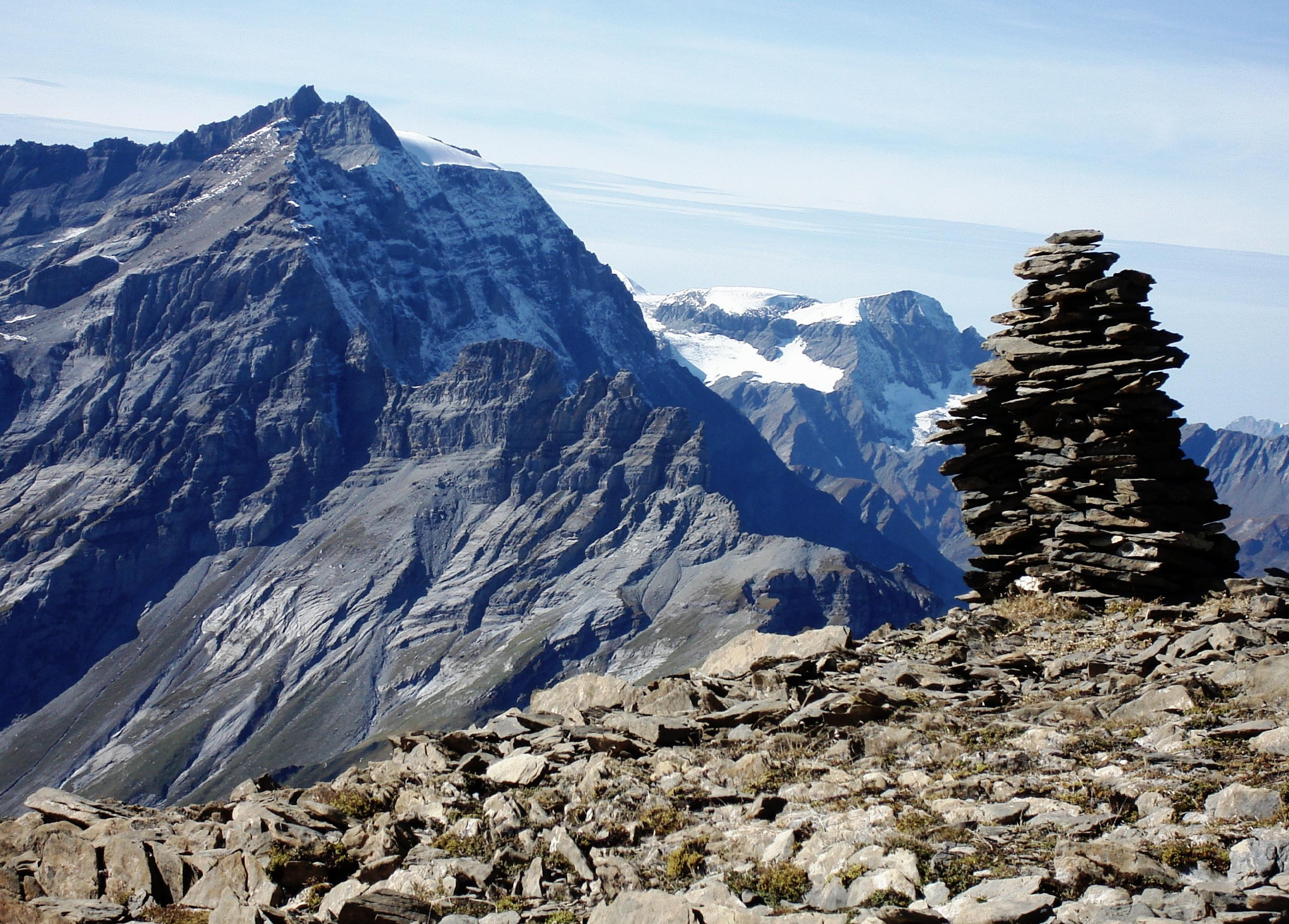
The Ringelspitz (left) and Piz Sardona (background) from the Calanda.

This is a list of mountains of the Swiss canton of St. Gallen. The canton of St. Gallen is partially located in the Alps and is one of the nine cantons having summits over 3,000 metres (9,800 ft). Topographically, the two most important summits of the canton are those of the Ringelspitz (most elevated and isolated) and the Säntis (most prominent).

All mountain heights and prominences on the list are from the largest-scale maps available.

== Topographic prominence of 150 metres or more ==
This list only includes significant summits with a topographic prominence of at least 150 metres (492 ft). There are over 50 such summits in the canton of St. Gallen and they are mostly found in its southern districts.

Mountain	Height (m)	Drop (m)	Coordinates	Range	District(s)	First ascent	Notes
Ringelspitz/Piz Barghis	3247	843	46°53′54″N 09°20′35″E	Glarus Alps	Sarganserland	1865	Summit located on the border with the canton of Grisons
Piz Dolf	3028	250	46°54′12″N 09°16′00″E	Glarus Alps	Sarganserland		Summit located on the border with the canton of Grisons
Pizol	2844	457	46°57′33″N 09°23′12″E	Glarus Alps	Sarganserland	1864	
Sazmartinshorn	2827	239	46°56′38″N 09°22′33″E	Glarus Alps	Sarganserland		
Haldensteiner Calanda	2805	1460	46°54′00″N 09°28′03″E	Glarus Alps	Sarganserland	1559	Summit located on the border with the canton of Grisons
Hangsackgrat	2634	196	46°57′09″N 09°19′18.5″E	Glarus Alps	Sarganserland		
Foostock/Ruchen	2611	388	46°57′24″N 09°14′41″E	Glarus Alps	Sarganserland		Summit located on the border with the canton of Glarus
Magerrain	2524	357	47°01′59″N 09°13′12″E	Glarus Alps	Sarganserland		Summit located on the border with the canton of Glarus
Säntis	2502	2015	47°14′58″N 09°20′36″E	Appenzell Alps	Toggenburg	1680	Highest peak of the Alpstein. Summit is the tripoint of the borders with the cantons of Appenzell Ausserrhoden and Appenzell Innerrhoden
Bützistock	2496	261	47°01′44″N 09°10′30.8″E	Glarus Alps	Sarganserland		Summit located on the border with the canton of Glarus
Wissgandstöckli	2488	357	46°59′42.5″N 09°14′59.6″E	Glarus Alps	Sarganserland		Summit located on the border with the canton of Glarus
Altmann	2435	282	47°14′22″N 09°22′18″E	Appenzell Alps	Toggenburg		Peak of the Alpstein. Summit located on the border with the canton of Appenzell Innerrhoden
Hochfinsler	2423	231	47°02′2.5″N 09°18′00″E	Glarus Alps	Sarganserland		
Gamsberg	2385	1358	47°08′07″N 09°22′28″E	Appenzell Alps	Sarganserland/Werdenberg		Highest peak of the Alvier group
Fulfirst	2384	219	47°07′47.5″N 09°23′48″E	Appenzell Alps	Sarganserland/Werdenberg		Peak of the Alvier group
Alvier	2343	243	47°06′35.1″N 09°24′53.4″E	Appenzell Alps	Werdenberg		Peak of the Alvier group
Gauschla	2310	180	47°06′07″N 09°25′21″E	Appenzell Alps	Werdenberg		Peak of the Alvier group
Hinterrugg	2306	470	47°09′13″N 09°18′17″E	Appenzell Alps	Sarganserland/Toggenburg		Highest peak of the Churfirsten
Brisi	2279	325	47°09′12″N 09°16′36″E	Appenzell Alps	Sarganserland/Toggenburg		Peak of the Churfirsten
Frümsel	2267	222	47°09′09″N 09°15′56″E	Appenzell Alps	Sarganserland/Toggenburg		Peak of the Churfirsten
Hochmättli	2252	267	47°03′09″N 09°10′22″E	Glarus Alps	Sarganserland		Summit located on the border with the canton of Glarus
Schibenstoll	2236	191	47°09′18″N 09°17′43″E	Appenzell Alps	Sarganserland/Toggenburg		Peak of the Churfirsten
Zuestoll	2235	225	47°09′16″N 09°17′09″E	Appenzell Alps	Sarganserland/Toggenburg		Peak of the Churfirsten
Selun	2205	158	47°09′10″N 09°15′20″E	Appenzell Alps	Sarganserland/Toggenburg		Peak of the Churfirsten
Speer	1951	535	47°11′08″N 09°07′22″E	Appenzell Alps	See-Gaster/Toggenburg		
Furgglenfirst	1951	302	47°15′24″N 09°26′25″E	Appenzell Alps	Werdenberg		Peak of the Alpstein. Summit located on the border with the canton of Appenzell Innerrhoden
Mattstock	1936	358	47°10′11″N 09°08′09″E	Appenzell Alps	See-Gaster		
Federispitz	1865	194	47°09′59.5″N 09°05′23″E	Appenzell Alps	See-Gaster		
Gonzen	1830	162	47°04′03″N 09°26′02″E	Appenzell Alps	Sarganserland/Werdenberg		Peak of the Alvier group
Hoher Kasten	1791	251	47°17′0.8″N 09°29′7.4″E	Appenzell Alps	Rheintal		Peak of the Alpstein. Summit located on the border with the canton of Appenzell Innerrhoden
Stockberg	1782	302	47°13′44″N 09°14′34″E	Appenzell Alps	Toggenburg		
Tweralpspitz	1332	542	47°17′27″N 09°01′34″E	Appenzell Alps	See-Gaster/Toggenburg		
Höchhand	1314	311	47°17′52″N 08°58′41″E	Appenzell Alps	See-Gaster		
Wilkethöchi	1172	310	47°20′18″N 09°10′30″E	Appenzell Alps	Toggenburg		

== Topographic prominence of less than 150 metres ==
Mountain	Height (m)	Drop (m)	Coordinates	Range	District(s)	First ascent	Notes
Tristelhorn	3114	109	46°54′6″N 9°19′0″E	Glarus Alps	Sarganserland		Summit located on the border with the canton of Grisons
Piz Sardona	3056	113	46°55′22.2″N 09°15′5.4″E	Glarus Alps	Sarganserland		Summit located on the border with the canton of Glarus
Zanaihorn	2821	148	46°56′51.5″N 09°24′18.2″E	Glarus Alps	Sarganserland		
Fahnenstock	2612	107	46°56′32″N 09°17′35″E	Glarus Alps	Sarganserland		
Spitzmeilen	2501	86	47°01′26.5″N 09°14′11″E	Glarus Alps	Sarganserland		Summit located on the border with the canton of Glarus
Wildhuser Schafberg	2373	133	47°13′46″N 09°21′08″E	Appenzell Alps	Toggenburg		Peak of the Alpstein
Chäserrugg	2262	14	47°09′18″N 09°18′46″E	Appenzell Alps	Sarganserland/Toggenburg		Peak of the Churfirsten
Grenzchopf	2193	108	47°14′49″N 09°19′25″E	Appenzell Alps	Toggenburg		Peak of the Alpstein. Summit located on the border with the canton of Appenzell Ausserrhoden
Silberplatten	2158	91	47°14′25″N 09°18′59.5″E	Appenzell Alps	Toggenburg		Peak of the Alpstein
Leistchamm	2101	149	47°08′45.5″N 09°12′48″E	Appenzell Alps	Sarganserland/See-Gaster		
Kamor	1751	73	47°17′23″N 09°29′12″E	Appenzell Alps	Rheintal		Peak of the Alpstein. Summit located on the border with the canton of Appenzell Innerrhoden
Chüemettler	1703	99	47°10′47″N 9°5′46″E	Appenzell Alps	See-Gaster		
Schnebelhorn	1291.9	112	47°19′32.2″N 08°58′46.7″E	Appenzell Alps	Toggenburg		Summit located on the border with the canton of Zurich
Hohgrat	996	106	47°23′07.5″N 08°57′58″E	Appenzell Alps	Toggenburg		Summit located on the border with the canton of Thurgau

== See also ==
- List of mountains of Switzerland
- Swiss Alps
