= Ringelspitz =

Mountain in Switzerland

- Piz Barghis
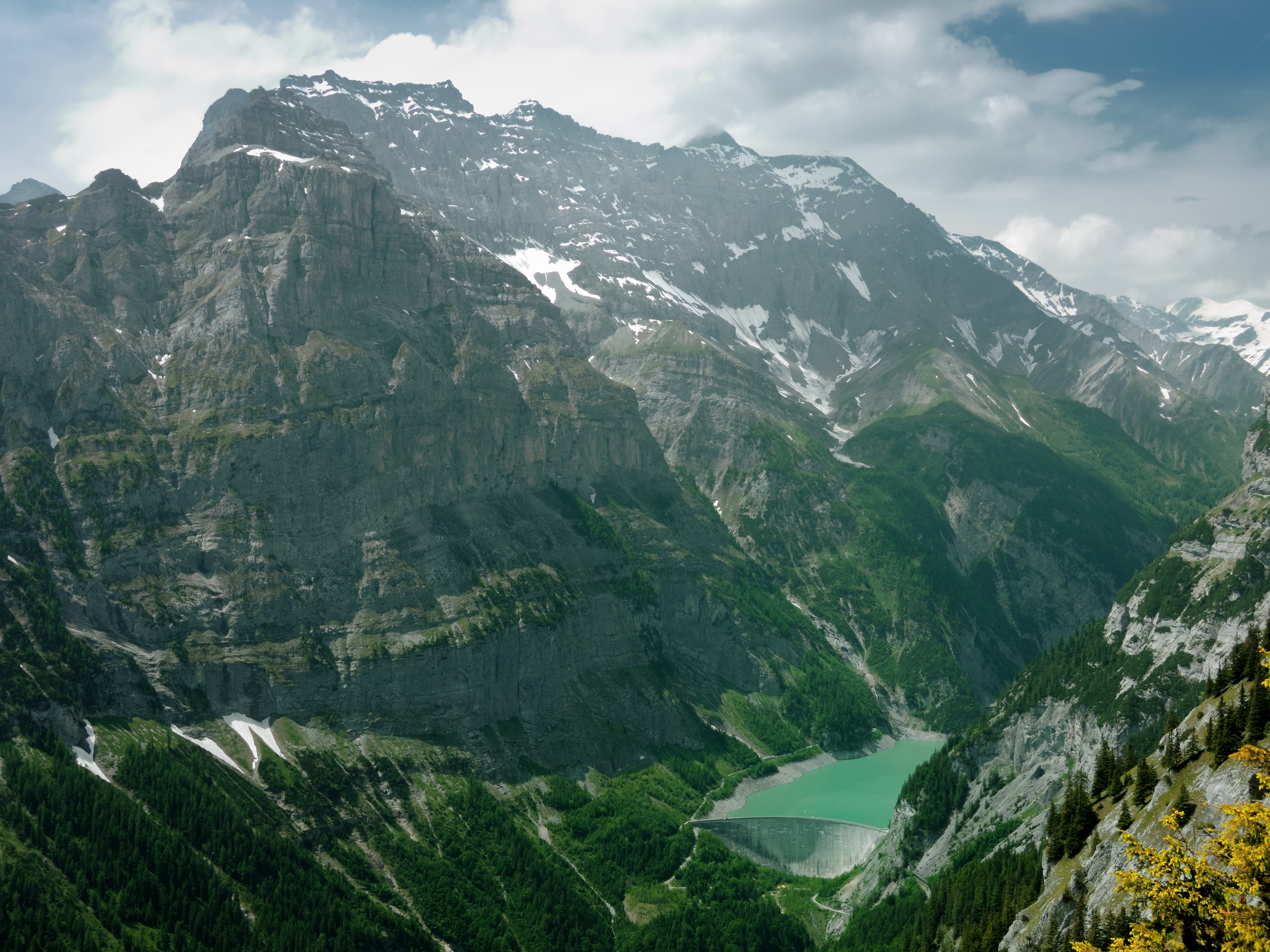
- The north side the Ringelspitz with the Gigerwaldsee

Highest point
- Elevation: 3,248 m (10,656 ft)
- Prominence: 844 m (2,769 ft)
- Parent peak: Tödi
- Isolation: 29.8 km (18.5 mi)
- Listing: Canton high point, Alpine mountains above 3000 m
- Coordinates: 46°53′54″N 9°20′36″E

Geography
- Location within Switzerland Location within Canton of Grisons Location within Canton of St. Gallen
- Location: Graubünden/St. Gallen
- Country: Switzerland
- Parent range: Glarus Alps

Geology
- Mountain type: Limestone

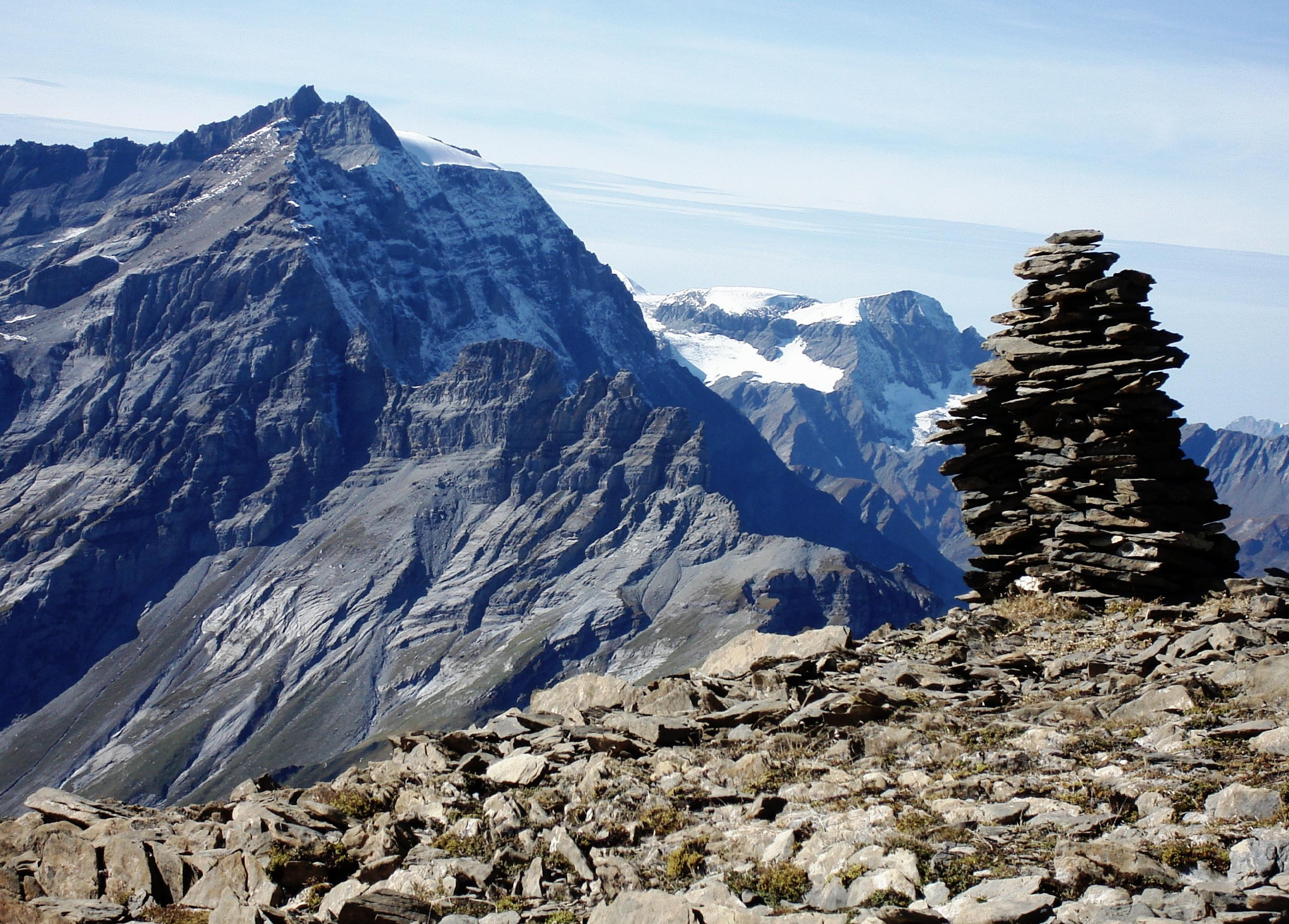
The Ringelspitz seen from the Calanda (east side)

The Ringelspitz (in German), also known as Piz Barghis (in Romansh), is a mountain of the Glarus Alps, located on the border between the Swiss cantons of St. Gallen and the Grisons (Graubünden). It is split between three municipalities: Pfäfers (St. Gallen), Trin and Tamins (both in the Grisons). Reaching a height of 3,248 metres (10,656 ft) above sea level, it is the highest summit in the canton of St. Gallen.

The Ringelspitz is the culminating point of a range, about 12 kilometres (7.5 mi) long, running from west to east and diverging from the main chain of the Glarus Alps between Piz Sardona and Piz Segnas. The massif separates the Calfeisen valley in the canton of St. Gallen from the Alpine Rhine Valley near Flims, the Grisons. The north side of the mountain consists of nearly 2,000 metres (6,600 ft) high precipitous cliffs overlooking the Gigerwaldsee (1,335 m [4,380 ft]). It is separated from the Calanda, located east of Ringelspitz, by the Kunkels Pass.

== See also ==
- List of mountains of Graubünden
- List of mountains of the canton of St. Gallen
- List of most isolated mountains of Switzerland
