= Schwarzsee (Pizol) =

Lake in St. Gallen, Switzerland

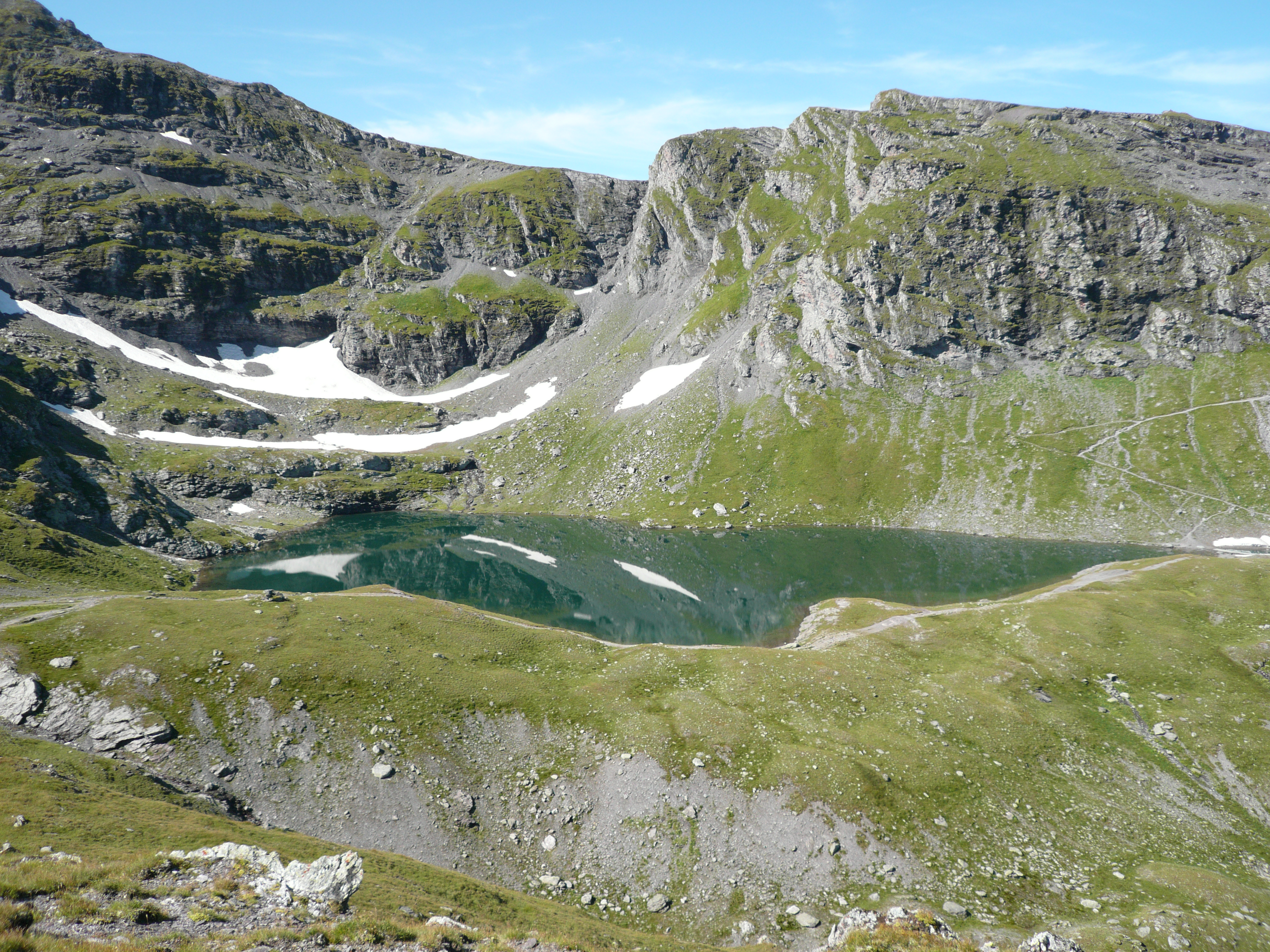

- Location within Canton of St. Gallen Location within Switzerland Location within Alps
- Interactive map of Schwarzsee
- Location: Pizol, Canton of St. Gallen
- Group: Pizolseen
- Coordinates: 46°59′3″N 9°23′49″E
- Type: Mountain lake
- Basin countries: Switzerland
- Surface elevation: 2,371 m (7,779 ft)

Schwarzsee (lit. 'black Lake') is a mountain lake in the canton of St. Gallen, Switzerland. Located at an elevation of 2,371 metres (7,779 ft), it is one of the five lakes on the Pizol mountain (2,844 m / 9,331 ft) of the Glarus Alps.

== See also ==
- List of mountain lakes in Switzerland
