= Oberricken Pass =

Swiss mountain pass

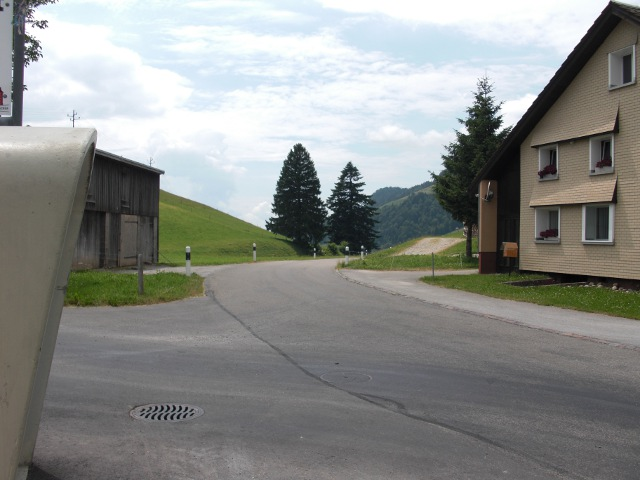
- Interactive map of Oberricken Pass
- Elevation: 906 metres (2,972 ft)

Third Approach
- Location: Switzerland
- Coordinates: 47.2732°N 9.0276°E

Oberricken Pass (el. 906 m.) is a mountain pass in the canton of St. Gallen in Switzerland. It connects the lower Ricken Pass with the villages Walde and Rüeterswil, in the municipality St. Gallenkappel.
