= Riseten Pass =

Mountain pass in Switzerland

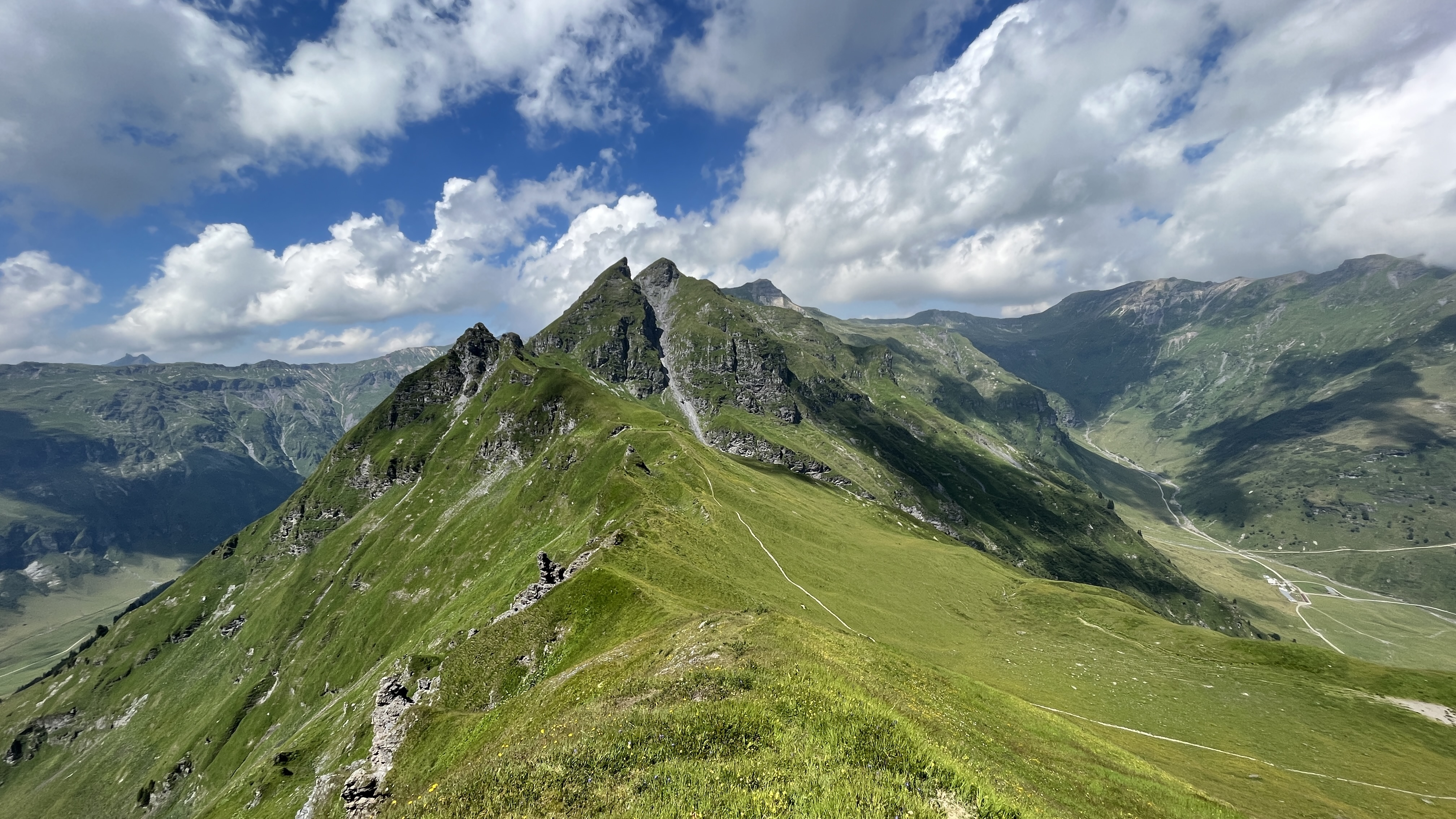
- Riseten Pass, Fulen, Feldegghoren/Hanen, view from the north ridge of Risetenhoren.

- Location within Switzerland
- Elevation: 2,189 metres (7,182 ft)
- Traversed by: Trail

Third Approach
- Location: Glarus/St. Gallen, Switzerland
- Range: Glarus Alps
- Coordinates: 46°58′41″N 9°14′48″E

The Riseten Pass (German: Risetenpass) is a mountain pass of the Glarus Alps, located on the border between the Swiss cantons of St. Gallen and Glarus, at an elevation of 2,189 m (7,182 ft). It crosses the col between the peaks of the Wissgandstöckli and Foostock.

The pass is traversed by a trail, which connects the village of Weisstannen, in the canton of St. Gallen at an elevation of 1,004 m (3,294 ft), with the valley of the Krauch stream and thence with the village of Matt, in the canton of Glarus at an elevation of 831 m (2,726 ft).

== See also ==
- List of mountain passes in Switzerland
