= Piz Sardona =

Mountain in Switzerland

- Surenstock
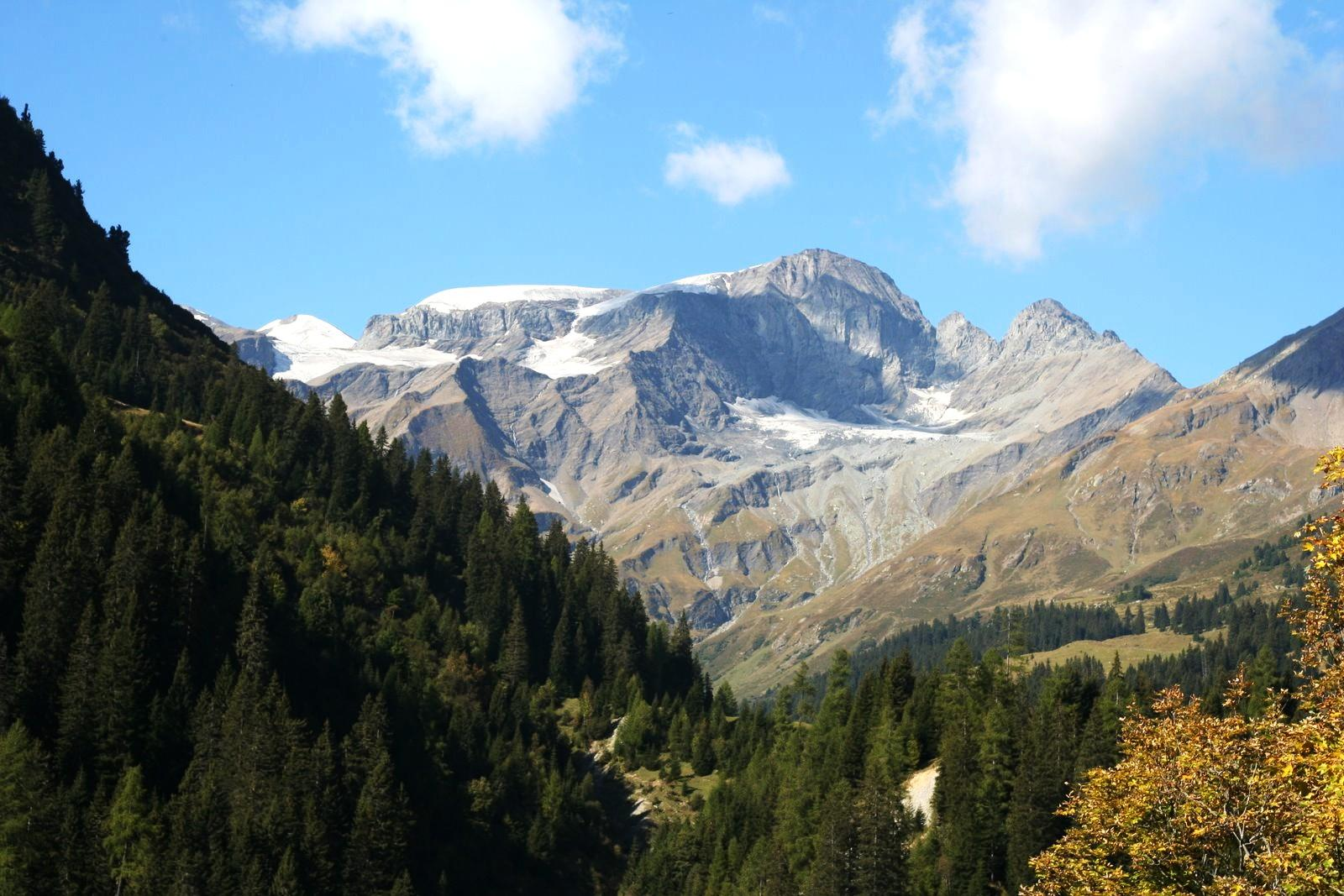
- Piz Sardona from the Calfeisen valley (east side)

Highest point
- Elevation: 3,056 m (10,026 ft)
- Prominence: 113 m (371 ft)
- Parent peak: Piz Segnas
- Coordinates: 46°55′22.2″N 9°15′5.4″E

Geography
- Location within Switzerland Location within Canton of Glarus Location within Canton of St. Gallen
- Location: Glarus/St. Gallen; (the mountain is partially in Grisons)
- Country: Switzerland
- Parent range: Glarus Alps

Piz Sardona (or Surenstock) is a mountain in the Glarus Alps, on the border between the cantons Glarus and St. Gallen. The 3,056 m (10,026 ft) high mountain overlooks the valleys of Sernf (Glarus) and Calfeisen (St. Gallen). Less than 1 kilometre (0.62 mi) south of the summit lies the tripoint (at 3,000 m [9,800 ft]) between the cantons of Glarus, St. Gallen and Grisons (Graubünden). The summit itself is the northernmost point above 3,000 metres in Switzerland.

The massif is covered by a few small glaciers, with the Sardonagletscher lying near the summit on the east side.

Piz Sardona is in the Glarus thrust area, a geologic UNESCO world heritage site, named "Swiss Tectonic Arena Sardona".

The Foo Pass lies to the north of the Piz Sardona and has a hiking trail from Weisstannen in St. Gallen to Elm in Glarus, forming part of the Alpine Pass Route between Sargans to Montreux.

== See also ==
- List of mountains of the canton of Glarus
- List of mountains of the canton of St. Gallen
