= Pizol =

Mountain in Switzerland

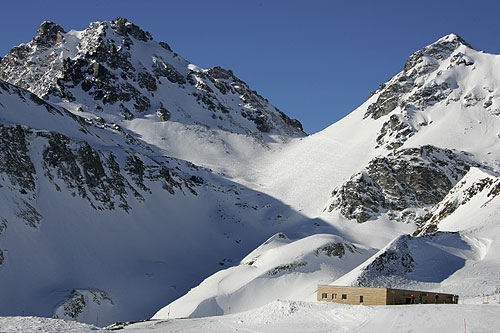
- The Pizol (left) from the Pizol hut (Pizolhütte)

Highest point
- Elevation: 2,844 m (9,331 ft)
- Prominence: 457 m (1,499 ft)
- Parent peak: Tödi
- Coordinates: 46°57′33″N 9°23′12″E

Geography
- Location within Switzerland Location within Canton of St. Gallen
- Country: Switzerland
- Canton: St. Gallen
- Parent range: Glarus Alps

The Pizol is a mountain of the Glarus Alps in Eastern Switzerland, overlooking Wangs in the canton of St. Gallen. At 2,844 metres (9,331 ft) above sea level, it is the highest summit of the chain separating the valleys of the Seez and the Tamina rivers, and the highest mountain lying entirely within the canton of St. Gallen.

Pizol Hut lies at 2,227 metres (7,306 ft). Pizol is also a ski resort.

On 22 September 2019, a 'funeral' and mourning ceremony was held for the Pizol glacier which had disappeared due to rising temperatures. A similar ceremony had been held in August when the Okjökull glacier in Iceland disappeared.

== Lakes ==
There are five mountain lakes (Pizolseen) on Pizol: Wangsersee at Pizolhütte, Wildsee, Schottensee, Schwarzsee (2,368 m [7,769 ft]) and Baschalvasee (2,174 m [7,133 ft]). A small cirque glacier, the Pizolgletscher, had been located above 2,600 metres (8,500 ft) on the northern side of the mountain.

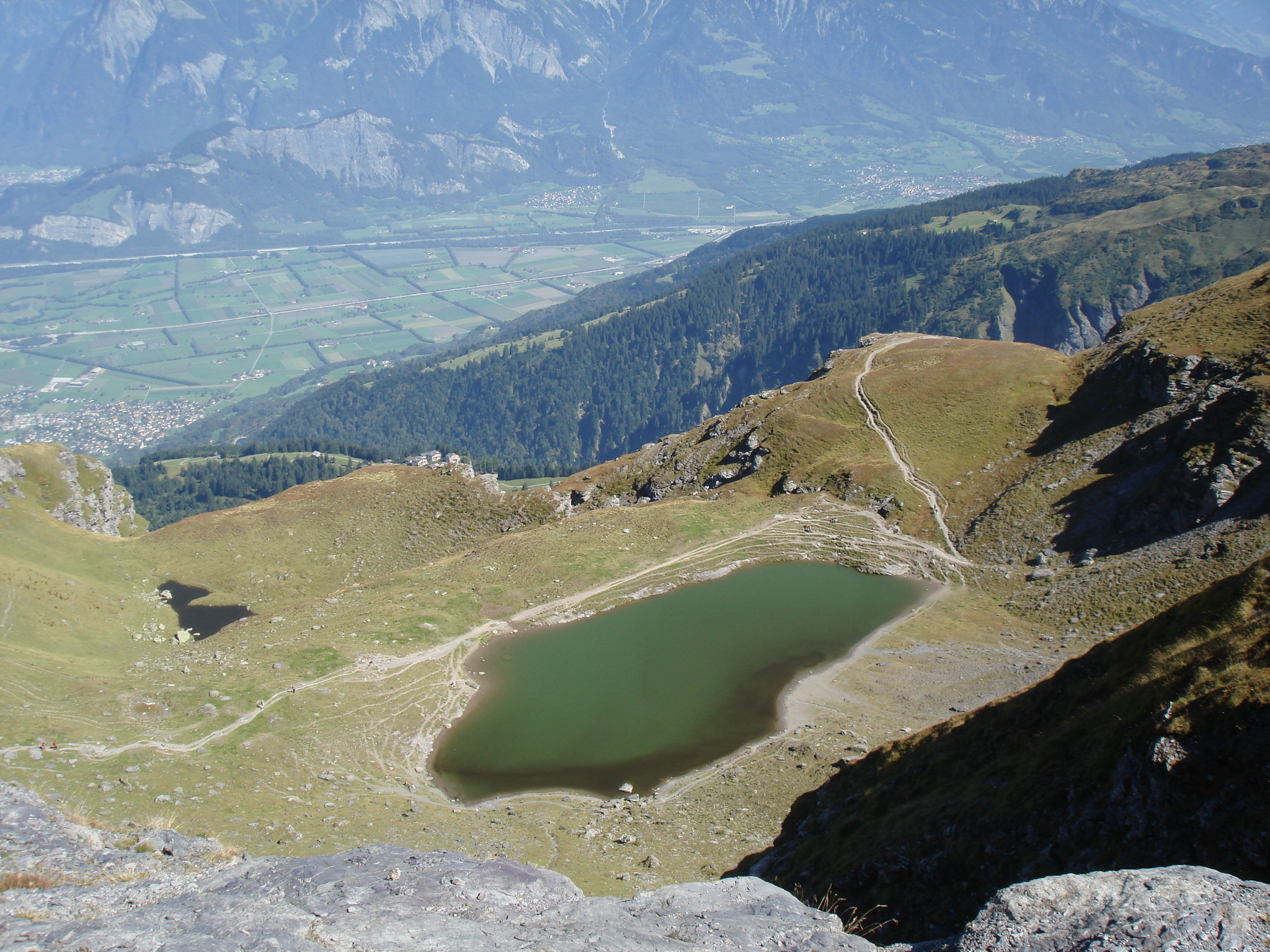
Baschalvasee

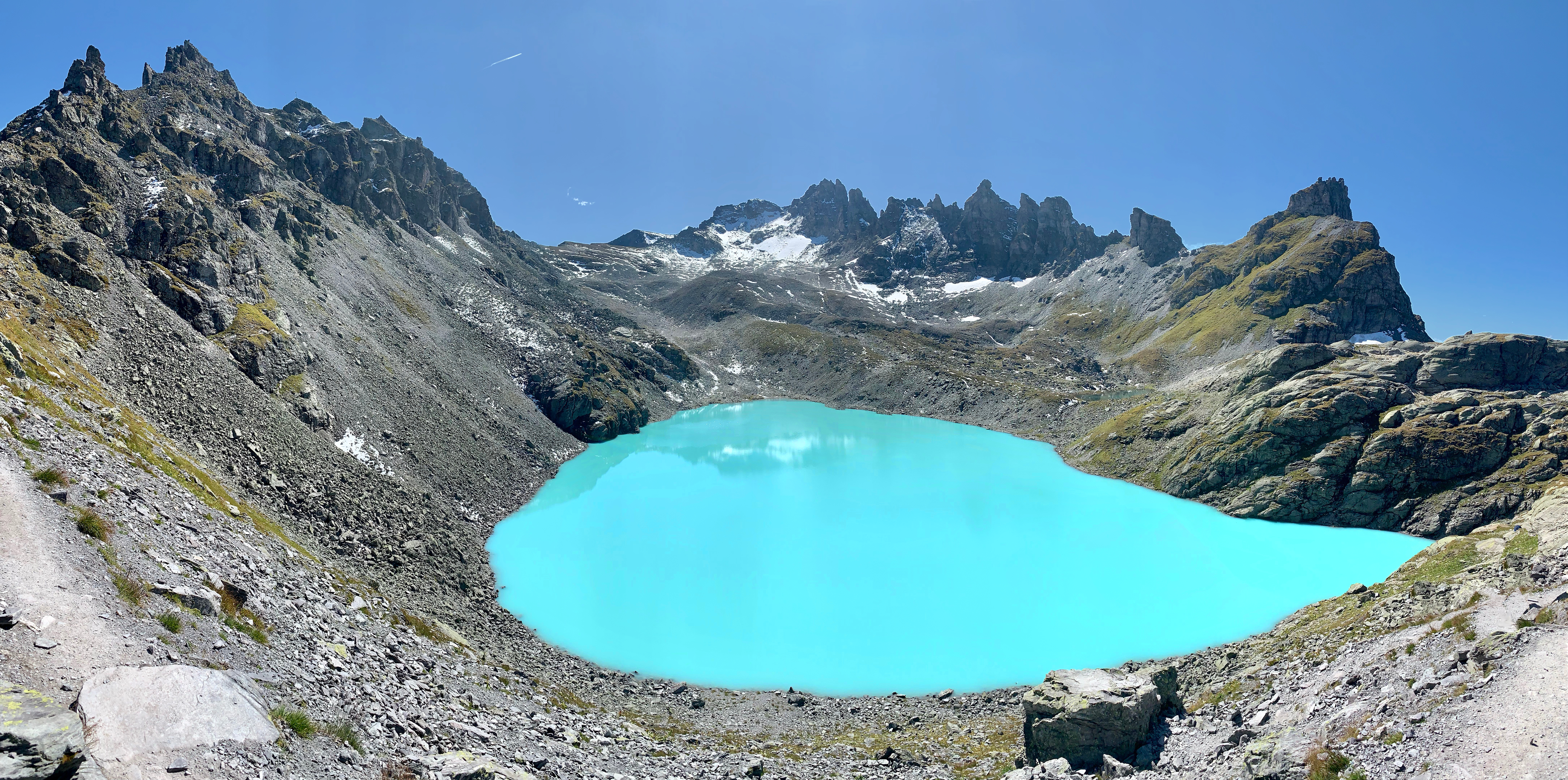
Schottensee

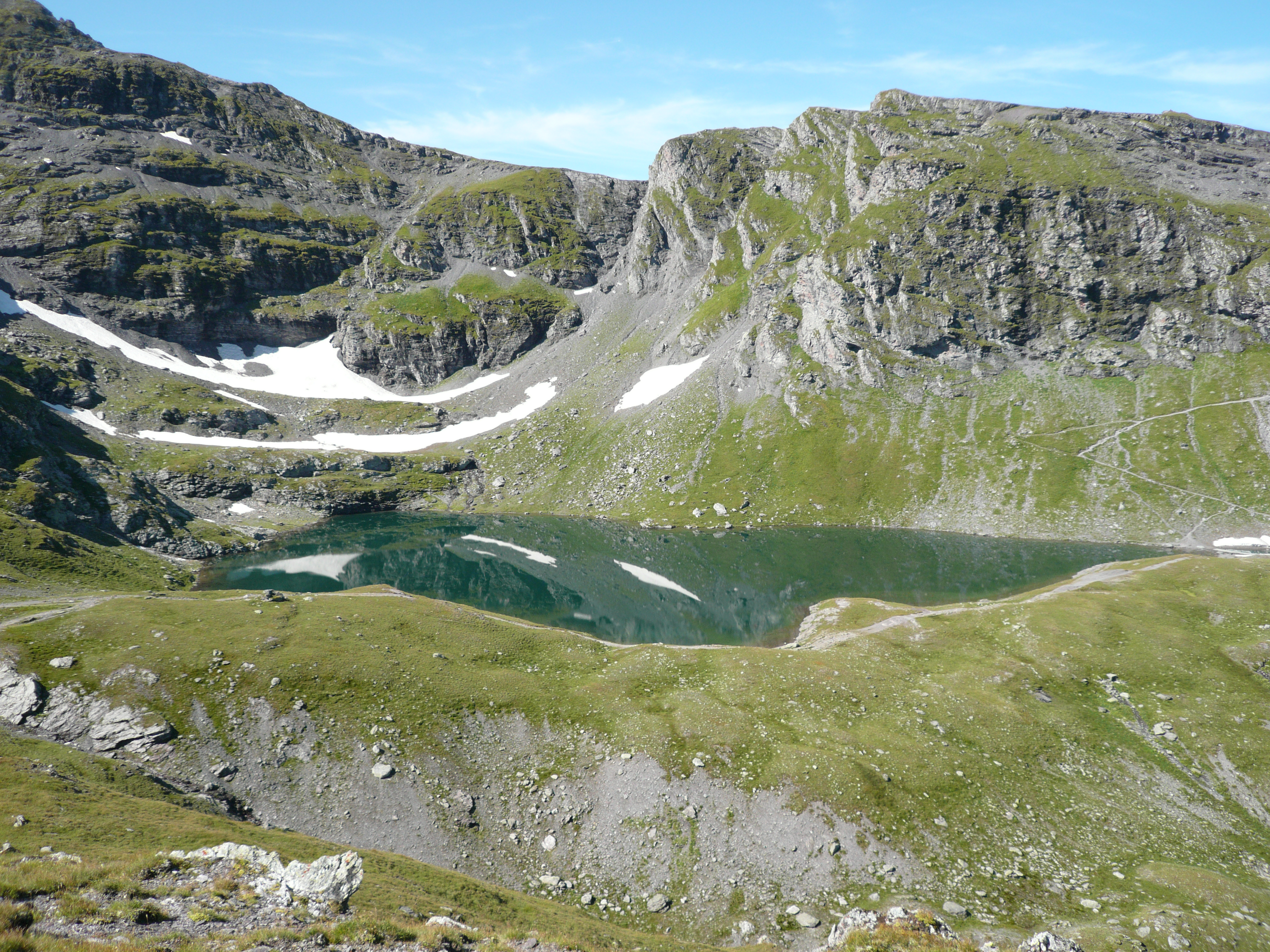
Schwarzsee

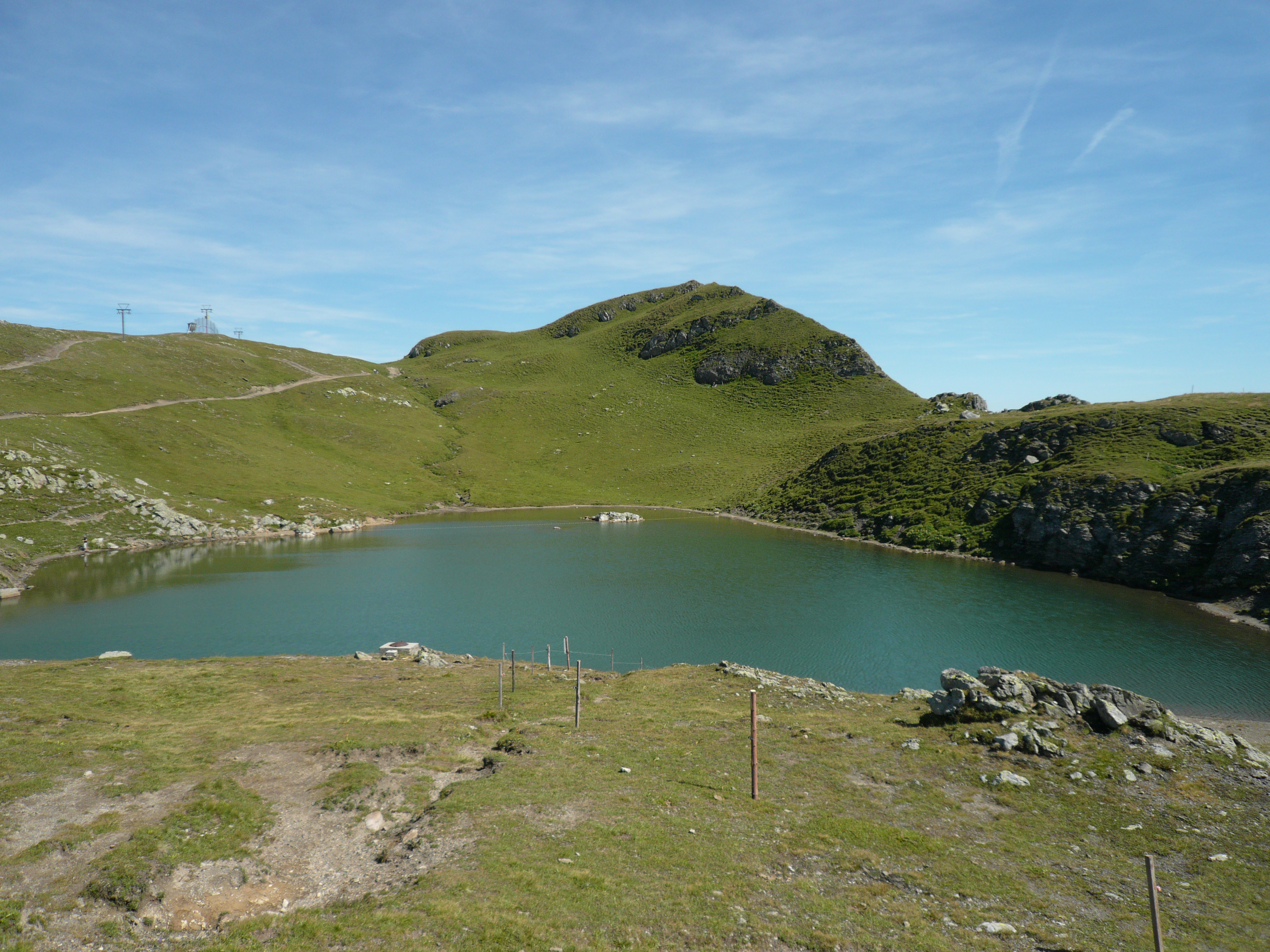
Wangsersee

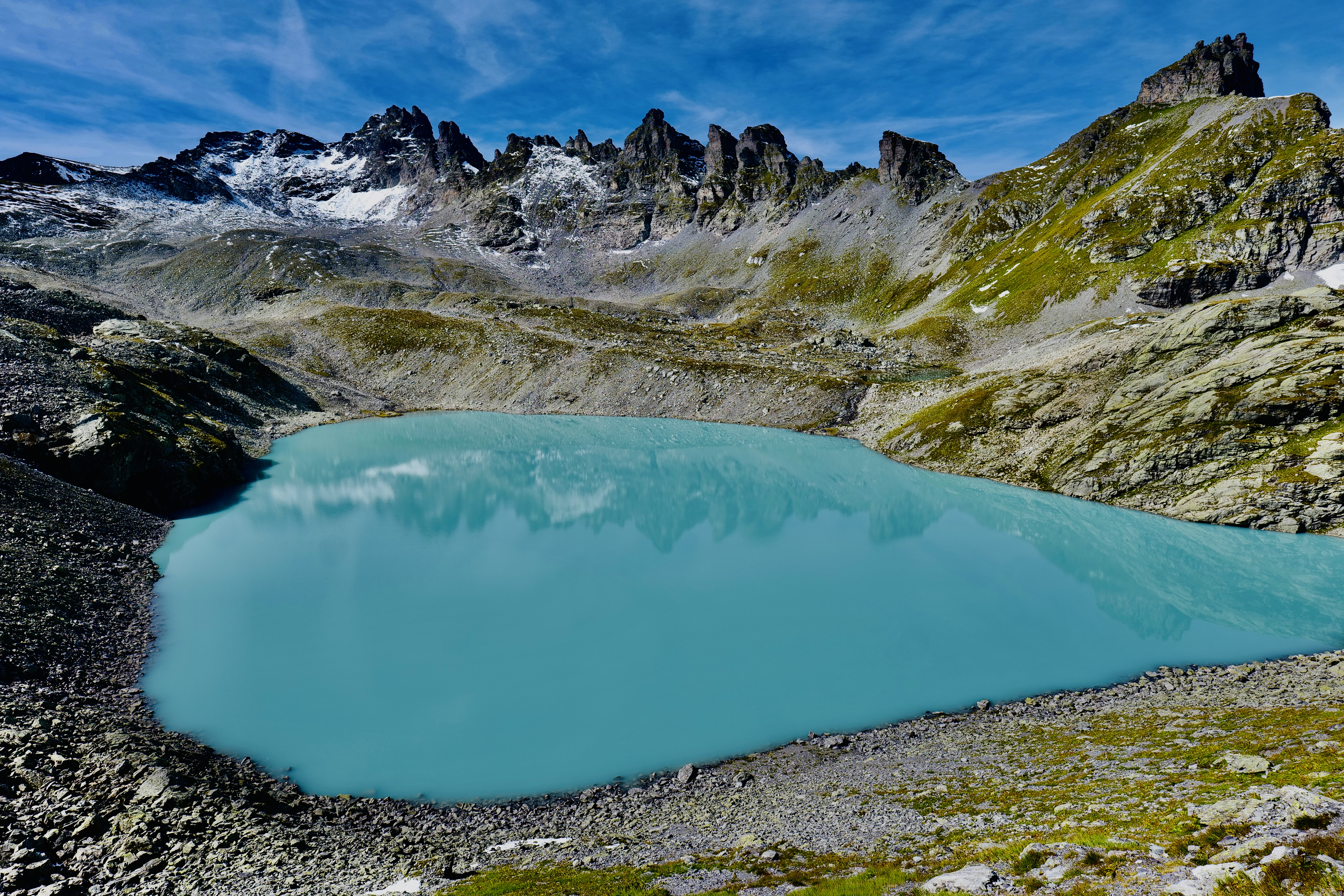
Wildsee

== Transport ==
Two gondola lifts link the Alpine Rhine Valley with top stations below the Pizol, from where chair lifts continue upwards. The valley station of the Bad Ragaz-Pardiel gondola lift, located northwest of Bad Ragaz, is linked to Bad Ragaz railway station by PostAuto bus routes. The Wangs-Furt cable car links Vilters-Wangs with Furt. Its valley station is linked by bus routes to Sargans railway station.

== See also ==
- List of mountains of the canton of St. Gallen
- List of ski areas and resorts in Switzerland
