= Magerrain =

Mountain of the Glarus Alps

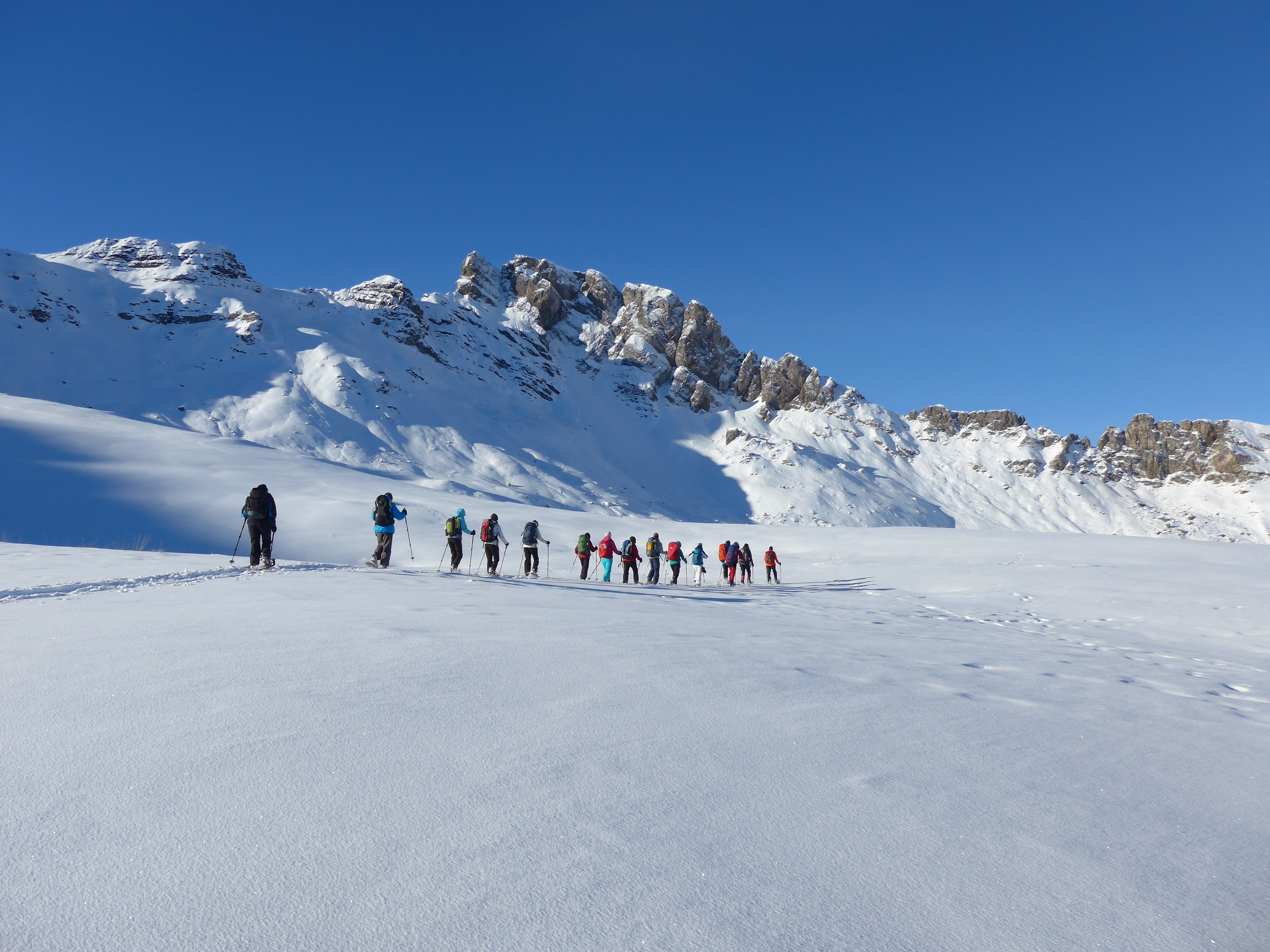
- Magerrain from east

Highest point
- Elevation: 2,524 m (8,281 ft)
- Prominence: 357 m (1,171 ft)
- Parent peak: Tödi
- Coordinates: 47°01′59.4″N 9°13′11.5″E

Geography
- Location within Switzerland Location within Canton of Glarus Location within Canton of St. Gallen
- Location: Glarus/St. Gallen
- Country: Switzerland
- Parent range: Glarus Alps

The Magerrain is a mountain of the Glarus Alps, located on the border between the cantons of Glarus and St. Gallen in Eastern Switzerland. Reaching an elevation of 2,524 metres (8,281 ft) above sea level, the Magerrain is the highest summit of the range north of the Walabützer Furggle (2,167 m [7,110 ft]) and the Risitenpass (2,189 m [7,182 ft]).

The closest locality is Engi on the south side.

== See also ==
- List of mountains of the canton of Glarus
- List of mountains of the canton of St. Gallen
