= Gigerwaldsee =

Reservoir in Canton of St. Gallen, Switzerland

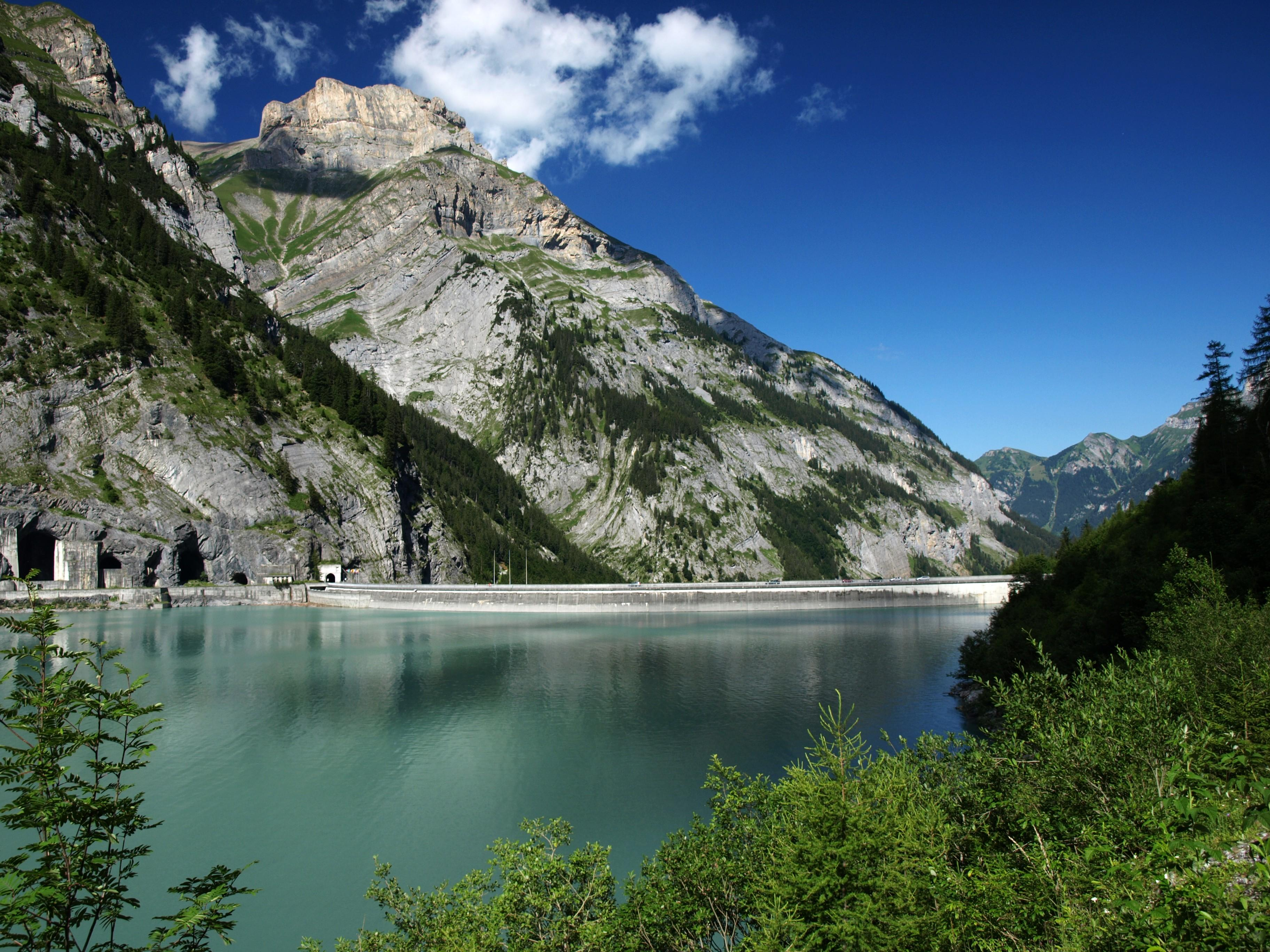

- Location within Canton of St. Gallen Location within Switzerland Location within Alps
- Interactive map of Gigerwaldsee
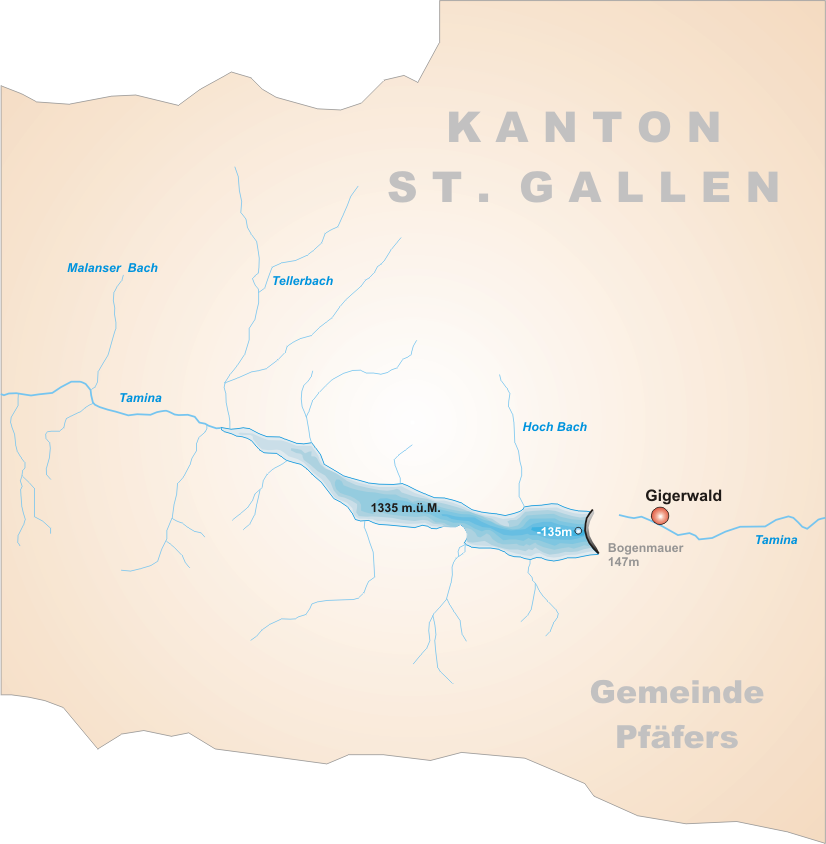
- map
- Location: Canton of St. Gallen
- Coordinates: 46°54′51″N 9°22′24″E
- Type: reservoir
- Catchment area: 52.06 km^{2} (20.10 sq mi)
- Basin countries: Switzerland
- Surface area: 0.71 km^{2} (0.27 sq mi)
- Max. depth: 135 m (443 ft)
- Water volume: 35.6 million cubic metres (28,900 acre⋅ft)
- Surface elevation: 1,335 m (4,380 ft)

Gigerwaldsee is a reservoir in the Calfeisental valley, located in the municipality of Pfäfers, Canton of St. Gallen, Switzerland. The reservoir has a volume of 35.6 million m³ and covers a surface area of 71 ha (180 acres).

The reservoir was formed by the arch dam Gigerwald, which was completed in 1976, standing at a height of 147 m.

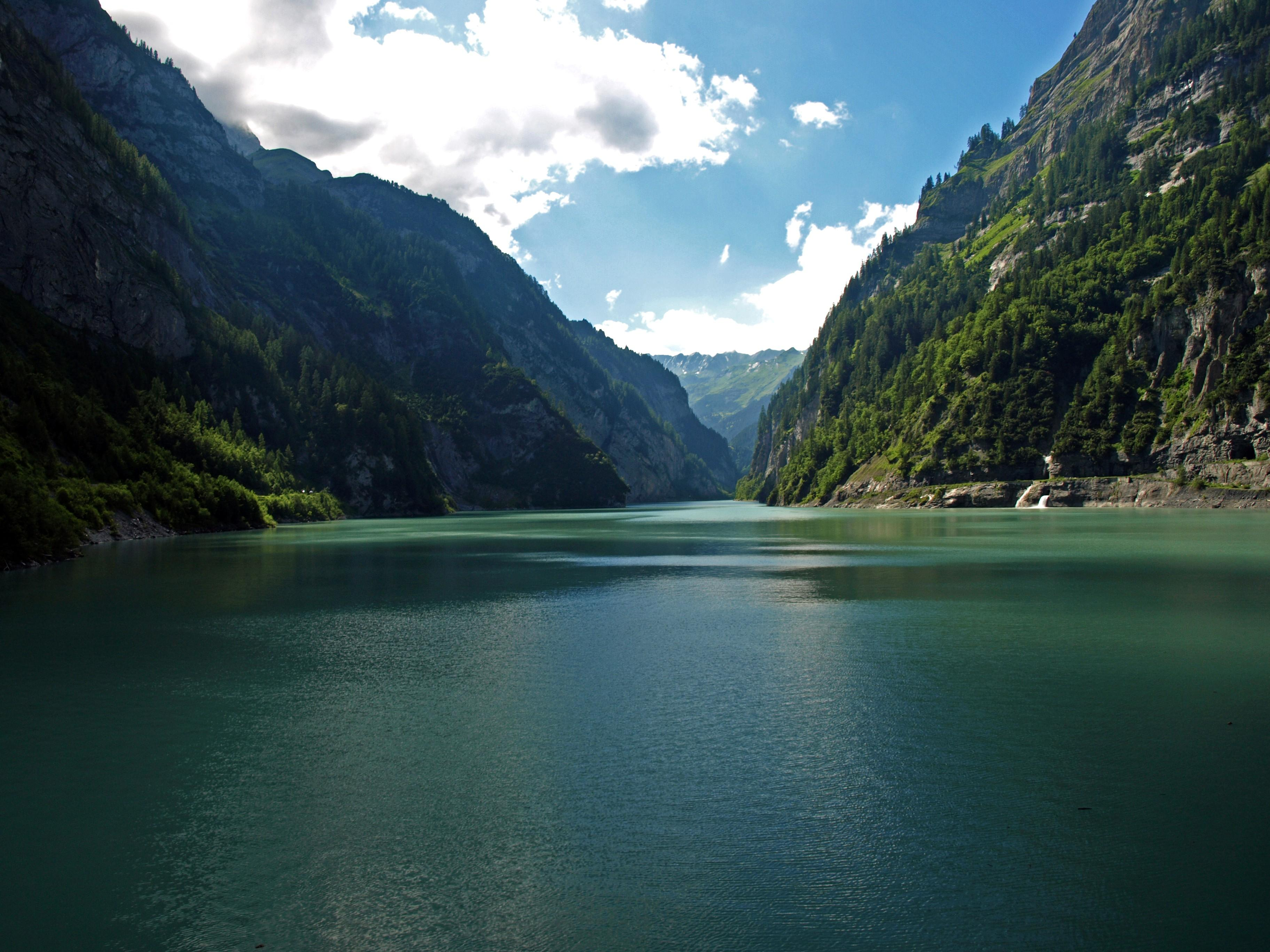

== See also ==
- List of lakes of Switzerland
- List of mountain lakes of Switzerland
