= Weisstannen =

Village in Switzerland

Coordinates: 46°59′26″N 9°20′40″E

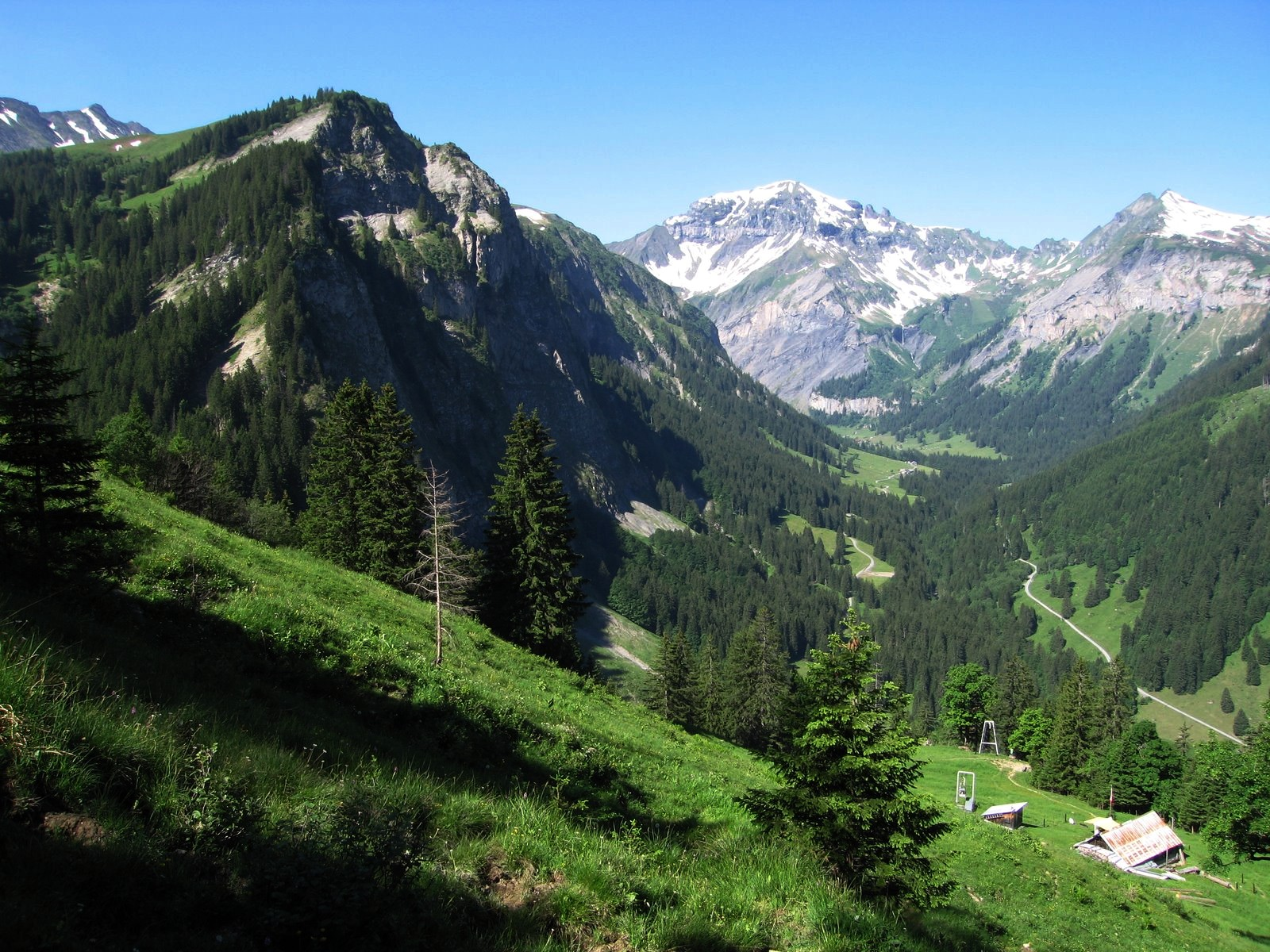
The Weisstannen valley

Weisstannen is a village located in the canton of St. Gallen, Switzerland. It lies in the municipality of Mels, south-west of Sargans.

Weisstannen is located at 1,004 metres above sea level on the Seez river in the Weisstannen valley (Weisstannental). It lies at the foot of the Pizol mountain.

Weisstannen is the starting point of the trails across Foo and Riseten passes, which cross to different villages in the canton of Glarus. The trail across the Foo Pass leads to the village of Elm and forms part of the Alpine Pass Route, a hiking trail which passes through Weisstannen on its journey from Sargans to Montreux. The trail across the Riseten Pass leads to the village of Matt.
