= Canton of St. Gallen =

Canton of Switzerland

Canton of St. Gallen Kanton Sankt Gallen (German) Canton of St Gall
- Canton
- Flag Coat of arms
- Interactive map of Canton of St. Gallen
- Coordinates: 47°20′N 9°10′E
- Country: Switzerland
- Capital: St. Gallen
- Subdivisions: 75 municipalities, 8 districts

Government
  - President: Susanne Hartmann
  - Executive: Regierung (7)
  - Legislative: Kantonsrat (180)

Area
  - Total: 2,030.75 km^{2} (784.08 sq mi)

Population (December 2020)
  - Total: 514,504
  - Density: 253.357/km^{2} (656.191/sq mi)

GDP
  - Total: CHF 38.041 billion (2020)
  - Per capita: CHF 74,210 (2020)
- ISO 3166 code: CH-SG
- Highest point: 3,248 m (10,656 ft): Ringelspitz
- Lowest point: 396 m (1,299 ft): Lake Constance
- Joined: 1803
- Languages: German
- Website: www.sg.ch

The canton of St. Gallen or St Gall (German: Kanton St. Gallen [zaŋkt ˈɡalən]; Romansh: Chantun Son Gagl; French: Canton de Saint-Gall; Italian: Canton San Gallo) is a canton of Switzerland. Its capital is St. Gallen.

Located in northeastern Switzerland, the canton has an area of 2,026 km^{2} (782 sq mi) (5% of Switzerland) and a resident population close to half a million as of 2015 (6% of Switzerland). It was formed in 1803 as a conflation of the city of St. Gallen, the territories of the Abbey of St. Gall and various former subject territories of the Old Swiss Confederacy.

== History ==
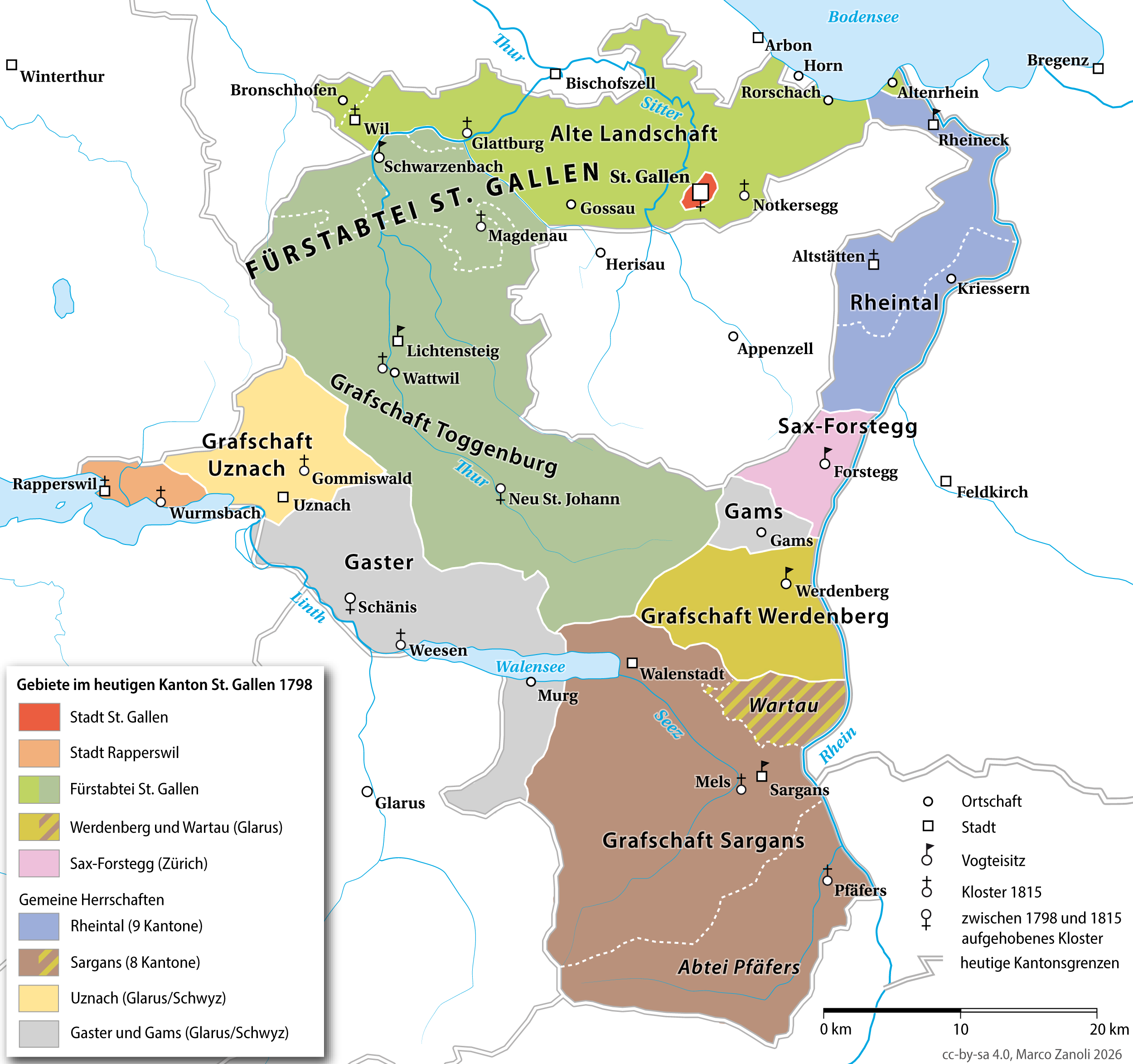
Map of the historical territories now united in the Canton of St. Gallen: Imperial City of St. Gallen, Imperial Abbey of St. Gallen, County of Toggenburg, Rapperswil, Uznach, Windegg (Gaster), County of Sargans, Pfäfers Abbey, Werdenberg, Lordship of Hohensax, Barony of Sax-Forstegg and Rheintal

Prehistoric human activity in the area of the canton of St. Gallen is evidenced by the findings of stone tools and animal bones at Wildenmannlisloch cave in the Toggenburg region, which date back to the Paleolithic period (40,000–35,000 years ago). Slightly older are the finds at Drachenloch (lit. 'dragon hole') cave in the Sarganserland region.

The Tabula Peutingeriana shows a Roman road and a settlement, Ad Rhenum (around present-day Rheineck/St. Margrethen), near the southern coast of Lake Constance. Centum Prata was a Roman vicus, now located in the municipality of Rapperswil-Jona. The Strahlegg ruin, a Roman watchtower in the municipality of Amden, dates back to 15 BC.

The canton of St. Gallen is an artificial construct of various historical territories, defined by Napoleon Bonaparte in the Act of Mediation in 1803. About half of the canton's area corresponds to the acquisitions of the abbey of St. Gallen over centuries.

The city of St. Gallen became independent of the abbey in 1405. At the same time, the abbey lost control of Appenzell. Conversely, the Toggenburg was acquired by the Abbey in 1468. Both the city and the abbey were associates (Zugewandte Orte) of the Old Swiss Confederacy, but unlike Appenzell never joined as full members.

Before the 1798 French invasion, the territory of the modern canton of St. Gallen consisted of the free city of St. Gallen, the territories of the Abbey of St. Gallen (including the Fürstenland and Toggenburg), the free city of Rapperswil, Pfäfers Abbey, Sargans and the independent lordships (bailiwicks) of Rheintal, Sax-Forstegg, Hohensax, Werdenberg, Windegg and Uznach.

In the Helvetic Republic (1798–1803), the northern parts of the modern canton of St. Gallen, together with Appenzell, became the canton of Säntis (named after the Säntis), while its southern parts, together with Glarus and parts of Schwyz, became the canton of Linth (named after the river Linth).

However, the two new cantons had immediate financial problems and were forced to institute a number of unpopular taxes and laws. The Abbey was secularized on 17 September 1798 and the Prince-Abbot Pankraz Vorster fled to Vienna (Austria). The unpopular laws and the closing of the Abbey caused unrest throughout the area. When the War of the Second Coalition broke out in 1799, an Austrian army marched into eastern Switzerland and returned the Prince-Abbot to his throne at the Abbey. However, his victory was short-lived. The Austrian and Russian armies were defeated outside Zurich and the French Army returned to St. Gallen, driving the Prince-Abbot out. In 1803, as part of the Act of Mediation, the area joined the Swiss Confederation as the Canton of St. Gallen.

The cantonal constitution of 1803 was revised in 1814. Because of the confessional heterogeneity of the canton's population, the 1814 constitution did unusually organise matters of religion, marriage and education not on a cantonal level but introduced a twofold division (confessional dualism), with separate Protestant and a Catholic assemblies subordinate to the legislative cantonal assembly (Grosser Rat).

The constitution was revised again in 1831, introducing elements of direct democracy. The constitution of 1831 divided the canton into 15 districts (Bezirke), reduced to 14 in 1918 (fusion of Tablat district with St. Gallen district).

Due to continuing confessional squabbles over the organisation of schools, the canton eventually placed education under its authority in 1861. The constitution was revised again in 1890, with a stronger emphasis on direct democracy. The 1890 constitution remained in effect, with numerous later changes, until 2001, the date of the latest revision of the cantonal constitution, when the division into districts was replaced by a division into eight constituencies (Wahlkreise), effective 1 January 2003.

== Geography ==
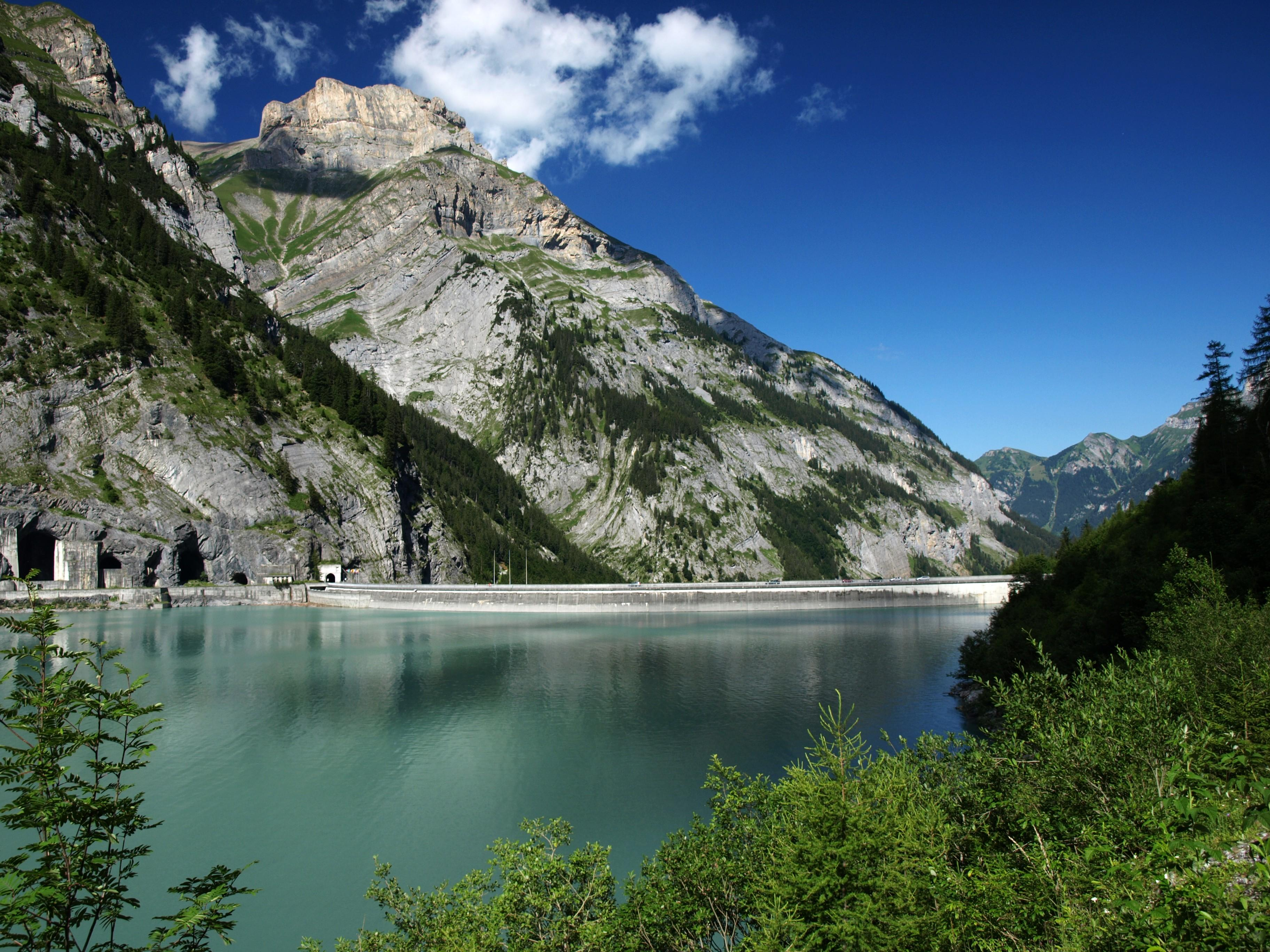
Gigerwaldsee, Calfeisental

The canton of St. Gallen is located in the north east of Switzerland and is part of the Eastern Switzerland region. To the north-east, the canton borders Lake Constance (Bodensee). To the east lies the Alpine Rhine Valley, with the Alpine Rhine and "Old Rhine" representing the borders with Austria (state of Vorarlberg) and Liechtenstein. To the south, the canton is bounded by the cantons of the Grisons (Graubünden), Glarus and Schwyz. To the west lies the canton of Zurich and to the north and west the canton of Thurgau. The two cantons of Appenzell Innerrhoden and Appenzell Ausserrhoden are completely surrounded by the territory of the canton of St. Gallen.

The main rivers of the canton are the Rhine (Alpine Rhine), Thur (forming the Thur waterfalls), Linth and Seez. Other rivers in the canton are the Jona, Seerenbach (forming the Seerenbach Falls), Necker, Sitter, Saar and Tamina. The topography changes from the plains near river Rhine, the Swiss Plateau and Lake Constance, towards the mountainous areas of the Alps in the south (Appenzell Alps and Glarus Alps), which includes also part of the Alpstein massif. About one third (619.7 square kilometers / 239.3 sq mi) of the canton is wooded, while nearly half of it (9,790.6 km^{2} / 3,780.2 sq mi) is used for farming. 278.6 km^{2} (107.6 sq mi) of the farm land is Alpine pastures. Of the rest of the canton, 259.1 km^{2} (100.0 sq mi) is considered unproductive, while 176 km^{2} (68 sq mi) is filled with housing or roads.

The land elevation above the sea-level varies from 398 m / 1,306 ft (Lake Constance) to 3,251 m / 10,666 ft (the Ringelspitz). The canton includes portions of Lake Constance (54 km^{2} / 21 sq mi), the Walensee (rather over 18 km^{2} / 6.9 sq mi), and Lake Zurich (10 km^{2} / 3.9 sq mi; mostly Obersee), and several small lakes and reservoirs wholly within its limits (e.g. Gigerwaldsee, Gübsensee, Murgseen, Schwarzsee, Schwendisee, Voralpsee). The only (named) island in the canton is the Schnittlauchinsel in the Walensee.

The mountains of the canton include part of a thrust fault that was declared a geologic UNESCO World Heritage Site, under the name Swiss Tectonic Arena Sardona, in 2008. The Churfirsten is located entirely within the canton of St. Gallen and features a cave, the Wildenmannlisloch.

== Political subdivisions ==
=== Constituencies ===
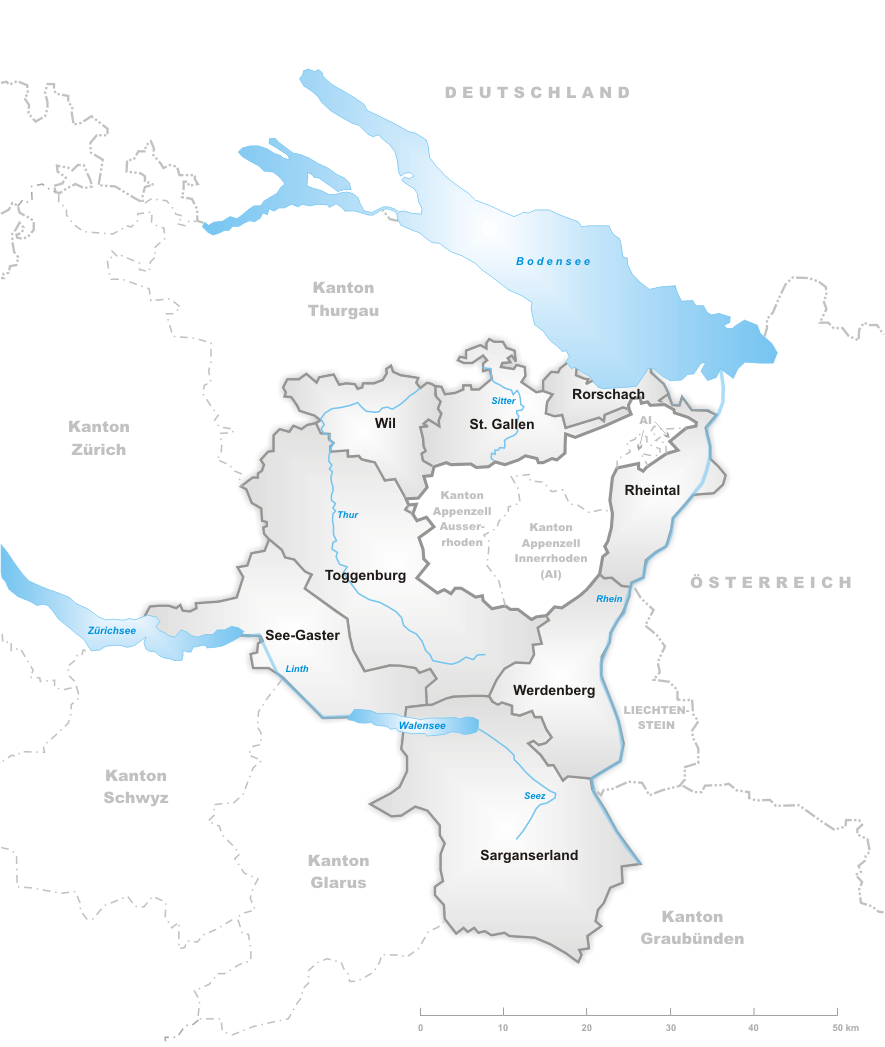
Wahlkreise

Since 2003 the canton is subdivided into 8 constituencies (Wahlkreise) replacing the districts (Bezirke).

- Rheintal with capital Altstätten
- Rorschach with capital Rorschach
- Sarganserland with capital Sargans
- See-Gaster with capital Rapperswil-Jona
- St. Gallen with capital St. Gallen
- Toggenburg with capital Lichtensteig
- Werdenberg with capital Buchs
- Wil with capital Wil

=== Municipalities ===
There are 75 municipalities in the canton (As of 2023).

== Politics ==
=== Federal election results ===
Percentage of the total vote per party in the canton in the Federal Elections 1971–2015
Party	Ideology	1971	1975	1979	1983	1987	1991	1995	1999	2003	2007	2011	2015
FDP.The Liberals^{a}	Classical liberalism	23.6	25.1	27.6	27.5	24.0	20.0	17.0	16.9	14.7	13.6	12.3	14.3
CVP/PDC/PPD/PCD	Christian democracy	44.0	43.3	44.1	40.8	39.4	35.8	31.0	26.2	22.2	21.4	20.3	16.6
SP/PS	Social democracy	14.6	15.1	18.0	16.3	11.4	13.1	16.2	17.1	18.4	14.7	16.7	14.2
SVP/UDC	Swiss nationalism	* ^{b}	*	*	1.9	*	*	8.4	27.6	33.1	35.8	31.5	35.8
Ring of Independents	Social liberalism	7.0	8.0	8.2	10.2	10.1	9.3	4.1	1.9	*	*	*	*
EVP/PEV	Christian democracy	3.0	*	2.1	*	2.3	*	1.7	1.3	1.5	2.0	1.8	1.8
GLP/PVL	Green liberalism	0.0	0.0	0.0	0.0	0.0	0.0	0.0	0.0	0.0	3.1	6.0	4.9
BDP/PBD	Conservatism	*	*	*	*	*	*	*	*	*	*	3.8	3.6
PdA/PST-POP/PC/PSL	Marxism	*	0.4	*	*	*	*	*	*	*	*	*	*
POCH	Progressivism	0.4	0.5	*	*	*	*	*	*	*	*	*	*
GPS/PES	Green politics	*	*	*	*	*	6.2	4.9	4.0	7.1	6.4	6.4	5.7
FGA	Feminist	*	*	*	3.3	5.3	^{c}	*	*	*	*	*	*
SD/DS	National conservatism	*	2.2	*	*	2.1	3.1	2.0	1.4	0.8	0.7	*	0.3
Rep.	Right-wing populism	7.0	5.4	*	*	*	*	*	*	*	*	*	*
EDU/UDF	Christian right	*	*	*	*	*	*	1.0	1.0	1.1	1.0	1.2	0.9
FPS/PSL	Right-wing populism	*	*	*	*	5.1	12.6	10.2	1.0	*	*	*	*
Other		0.3	*	*	*	0.2	*	3.4	1.8	1.3	1.2	*	1.9
Voter participation %		62.0	53.5	45.0	44.0	43.6	42.9	41.0	43.6	42.8	46.8	46.8	46.5

^a FDP before 2009, FDP.The Liberals after 2009
^b "*" indicates that the party was not on the ballot in this canton.
^c Part of the GPS

== Demographics ==
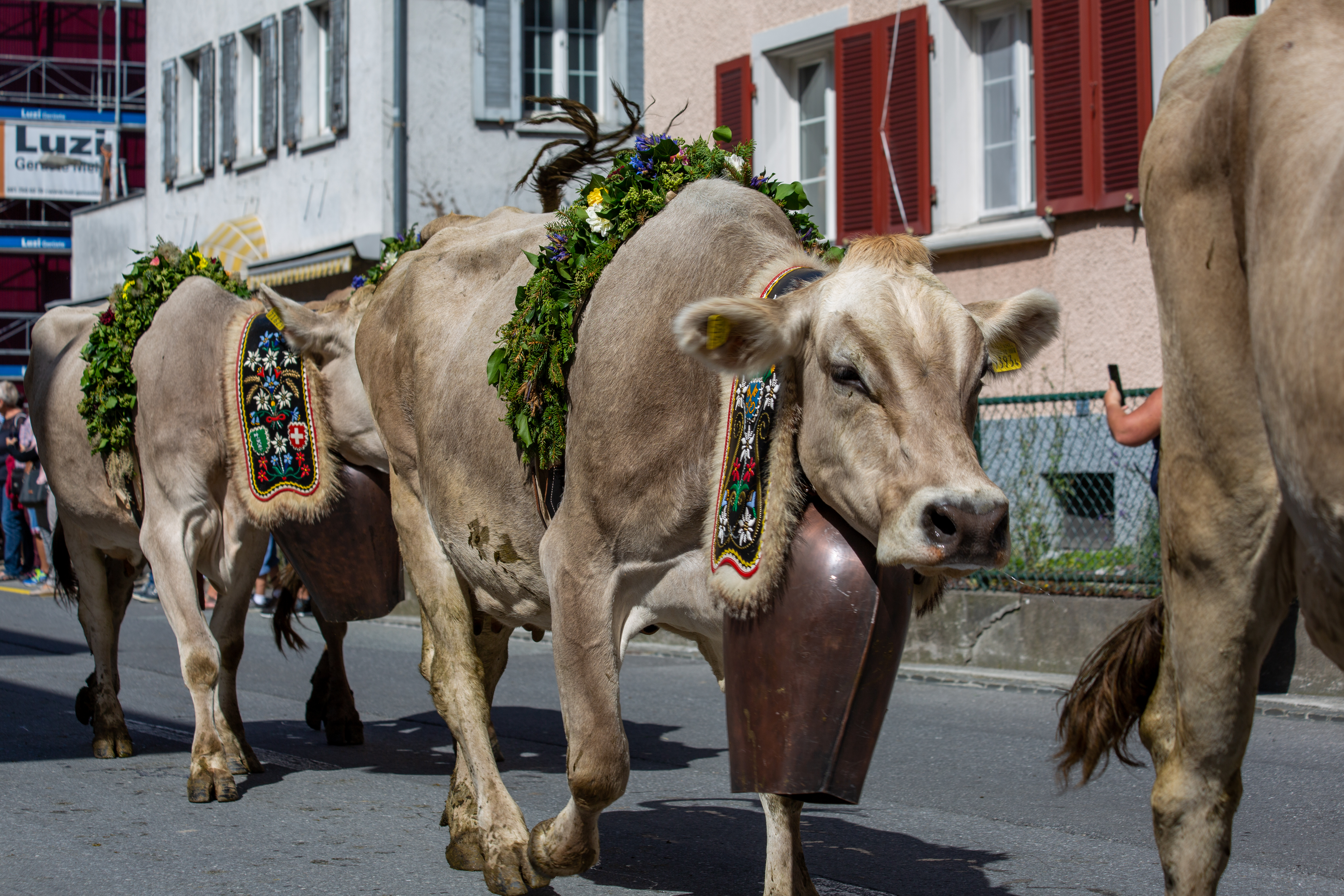
Almabtrieb at Mels in 2019

88% of the population is German-speaking. The main centres of population are the capital St. Gallen (69,700 inhabitants), Rapperswil-Jona (27,000), Wil (17,500) and Gossau (17,000). As of 2007, the population included 97,461 foreigners, or about 20.9% of the total population. The majority of the population (as of 2000) is Roman Catholic (52%) while a large minority is Protestant (28%).

=== Historical population ===
The historical population is given in the following table:

Historic Population Data
Year	Total Population	Swiss	Non-Swiss	Population share of total country
1850	169,625	166,367	3,258	7.1%
1880	209,719	198,195	11,524	7.4%
1900	250,285	221,841	28,444	7.4%
1950	309,106	289,268	19,838	6.7%
1970	384,475	325,641	58,834	6.1%
2000	452,837	361,904	90,933	6.2%
2020	514,504			6.0%

== Economy ==
Agricultural activity consists predominantly of dairy farming and cattle breeding in the mountainous areas. In the plains fruit and wine production are important, but there is also mixed farming. Industries of the canton include optical goods, pyrotechnics, chemicals and pharmaceuticals.

=== Tourism and recreation ===
Tourism plays an important role in the many resorts and a great number of winter sports facilities (Amden, Degersheim, Nesslau, Flumserberg, Pizol, Wildhaus-Alt St. Johann). Atzmännig, near Eschenbach, and Flumserberg are summer and winter sports areas, both featuring summer toboggans and a ski areas. There is a thermal spa in Bad Ragaz and another one in St. Margrethen. Quinten, located on the steep slope on the northern shore of Walensee (Lake Walen), is a car-free village and a popular hiking area. Another hiking trail is the Rheintaler Höhenweg above the Alpine Rhine Valley. There is a canopy walkway in Mogelsberg.

== Education ==
Higher educational institutions include the Eastern Switzerland University of Applied Sciences (OST), with campuses in Buchs, Rapperswil-Jona (formerly Hochschule für Technik Rapperswil) and St. Gallen, and the University of St. Gallen (HSG) in St. Gallen. There are in total six gymnasia (Kantonsschule): two in St. Gallen (Kantonsschule am Brühl, Kantonsschule am Burggraben), and one each in Au (Kantonsschule Heerbrugg), Sargans (Kantonsschule Sargans), Wattwil (Kantonsschule Wattwil) and Wil (Kantonsschule Wil).

== Transport ==
Regional rail within the canton and neighbouring areas is provided mainly by St. Gallen S-Bahn (partly also by Zurich S-Bahn). Some lines are also part of the Bodensee S-Bahn. Additionally, PostAuto and several other bus operators serve towns and villages within the canton. Rail and bus services operate within the Ostwind tariff network.

Several cable cars and two funiculars (Iltiosbahn, Mühleggbahn) provide access to mountains.

The Schiffsbetrieb Walensee operates boat cruises on Walensee. The ZSG runs boat cruises on Lake Zurich, including Obersee. Schweizerische Bodensee-Schifffahrt operates boats on Lake Constance and Alter Rhein. Main harbours are in Rapperswil and Rorschach. Landing stages are also present in Rheineck and Schmerikon (next to their railway stations).

The canton is served by St. Gallen–Altenrhein Airport, which provides direct routes to Vienna in Austria and to some European destinations which are operated by People's airlines. However, Zurich Airport is frequently used by air travellers from the canton which provides most domestic and international destinations.

The canton is traversed by the following motorways: A1 in the north, A3 in the south, A13 (Hauptstrasse 13) in the east, A15 in the west. Mountain passes are Foo Pass, Hulftegg Pass, Oberricken Pass, Ricken Pass, Riseten Pass, Ruppen Pass, Schwägalp Pass, St. Anton Pass, and Wildhaus Pass.
