= Zindlenspitz =

Mountain in Switzerland

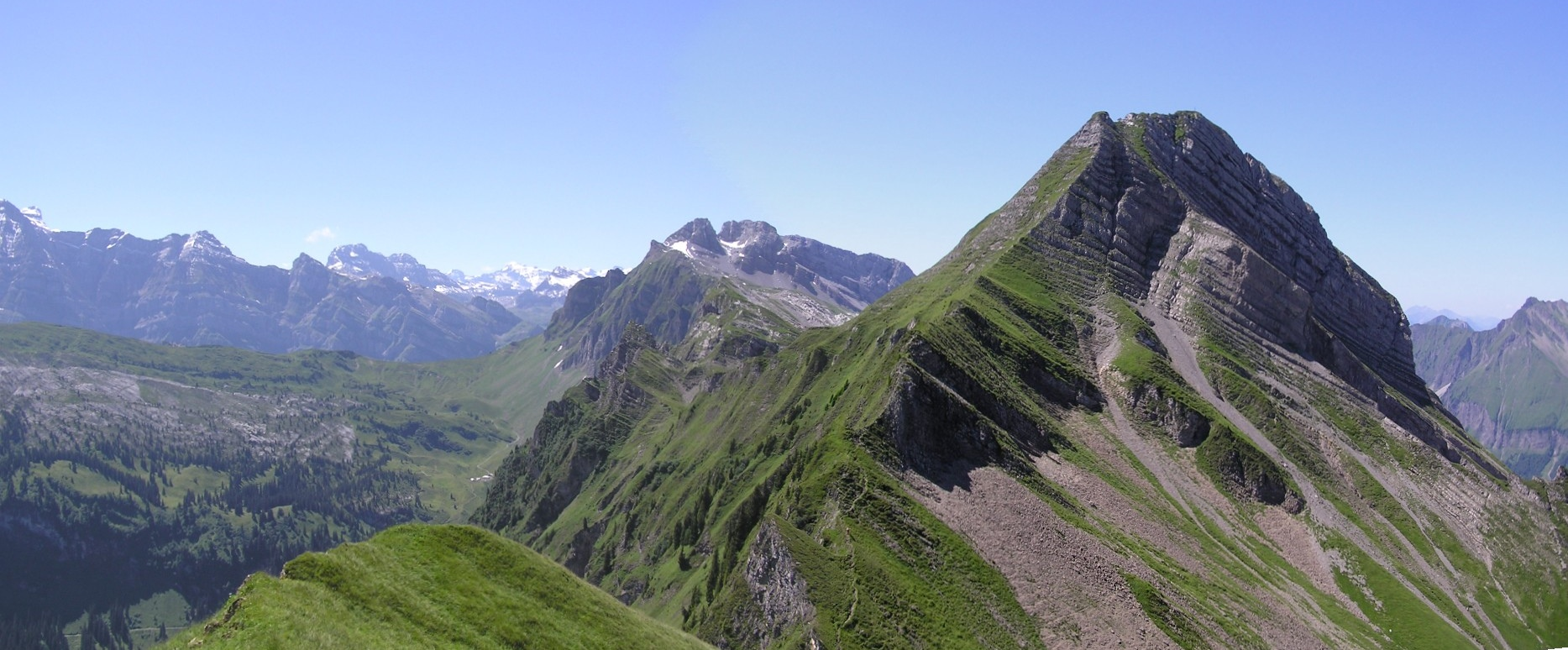
- Zindlenspitz (right) from Rossalpelispitz (north side)

Highest point
- Elevation: 2,097 m (6,880 ft)
- Prominence: 195 m (640 ft)
- Parent peak: Brünnelistock
- Coordinates: 47°4′34.5″N 8°57′36″E

Geography
- Location within Switzerland Location within Canton of Glarus Location within Canton of Schwyz
- Country: Switzerland
- Cantons: Glarus / Schwyz
- Parent range: Schwyzer Alps

The Zindlenspitz (2,097 m [6,880 ft]) is a mountain of the Schwyzer Alps, located on the border between the Swiss cantons of Schwyz and Glarus. It lies on the range between the Wägitalersee and the Obersee, south of the Brünnelistock.

== See also ==
- List of mountains of the canton of Glarus
- List of mountains of the canton of Schwyz
