= Schilt =

Mountain in Switzerland

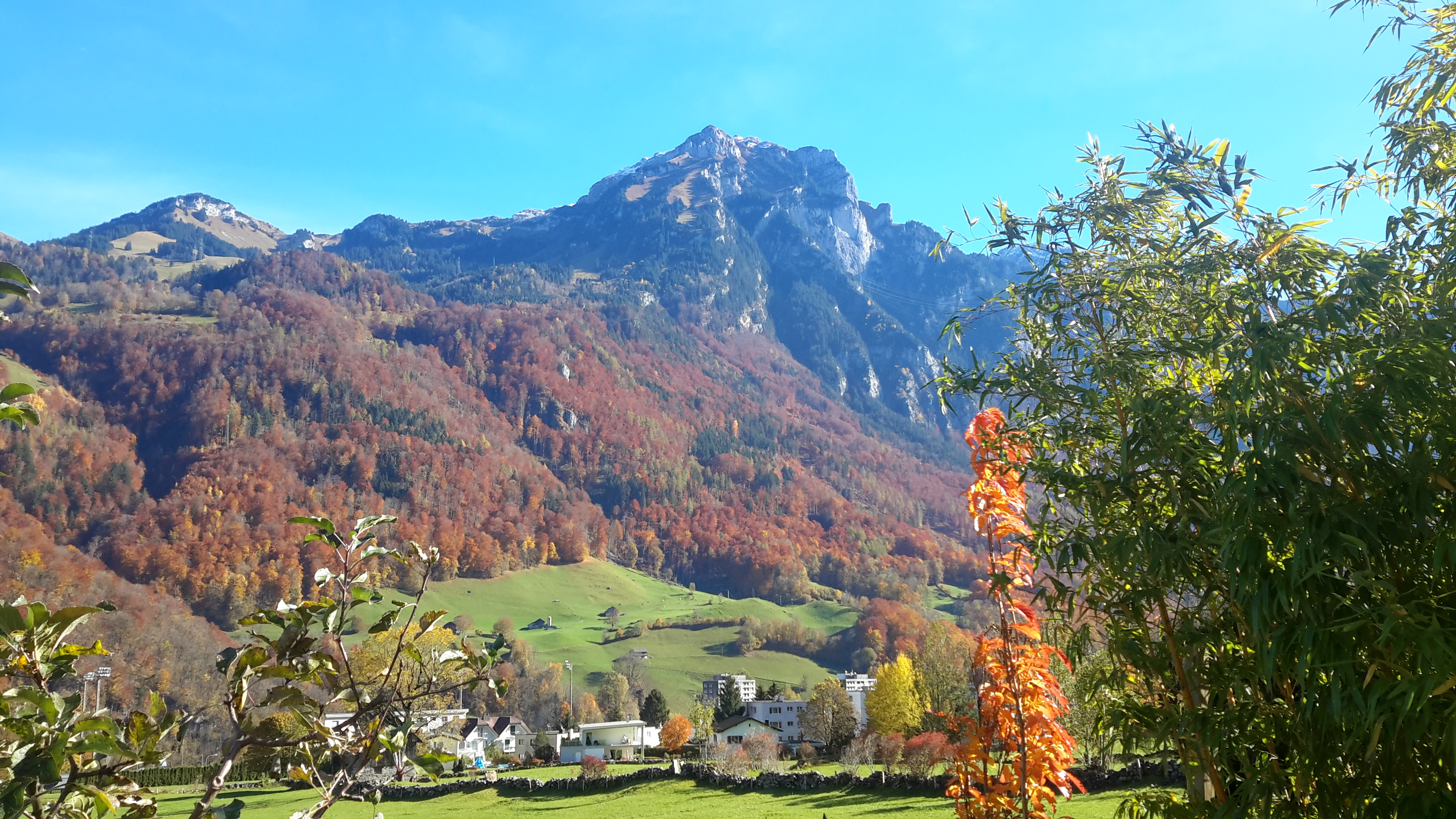

Highest point
- Elevation: 2,299 m (7,543 ft)
- Prominence: 58 m (190 ft)
- Parent peak: Siwellen
- Coordinates: 47°02′39.5″N 9°06′44″E

Geography
- Location within Switzerland Location within Canton of Glarus
- Country: Switzerland
- Canton: Glarus
- Parent range: Glarus Alps

The Schilt (2,299 m [7,543 ft]) is a mountain of the Glarus Alps, overlooking the town of Glarus in the canton of Glarus, Switzerland. It lies south of the Siwellen.

== See also ==
- List of mountains of the canton of Glarus
