= Mättlenstöck =

Mountain in Switzerland

- Location within Switzerland Location within Canton of Glarus

Highest point
- Elevation: 2,808 m (9,213 ft)
- Prominence: 159 m (522 ft)
- Parent peak: Hausstock
- Coordinates: 46°53′15.5″N 9°3′57.5″E

Geography
- Country: Switzerland
- Canton: Glarus
- Parent range: Glarus Alps

The Mättlenstöck (2,808 m [9,213 ft]) is a mountain in the Glarus Alps, located between Linthal and Elm in the canton of Glarus, Switzerland. It lies north of the Hausstock, on the range separating the two main valleys of the canton: the main Linth valley on the west and the Sernftal on the east.

== See also ==
- List of mountains of the canton of Glarus
