= Bocktschingel =

Mountain in Switzerland

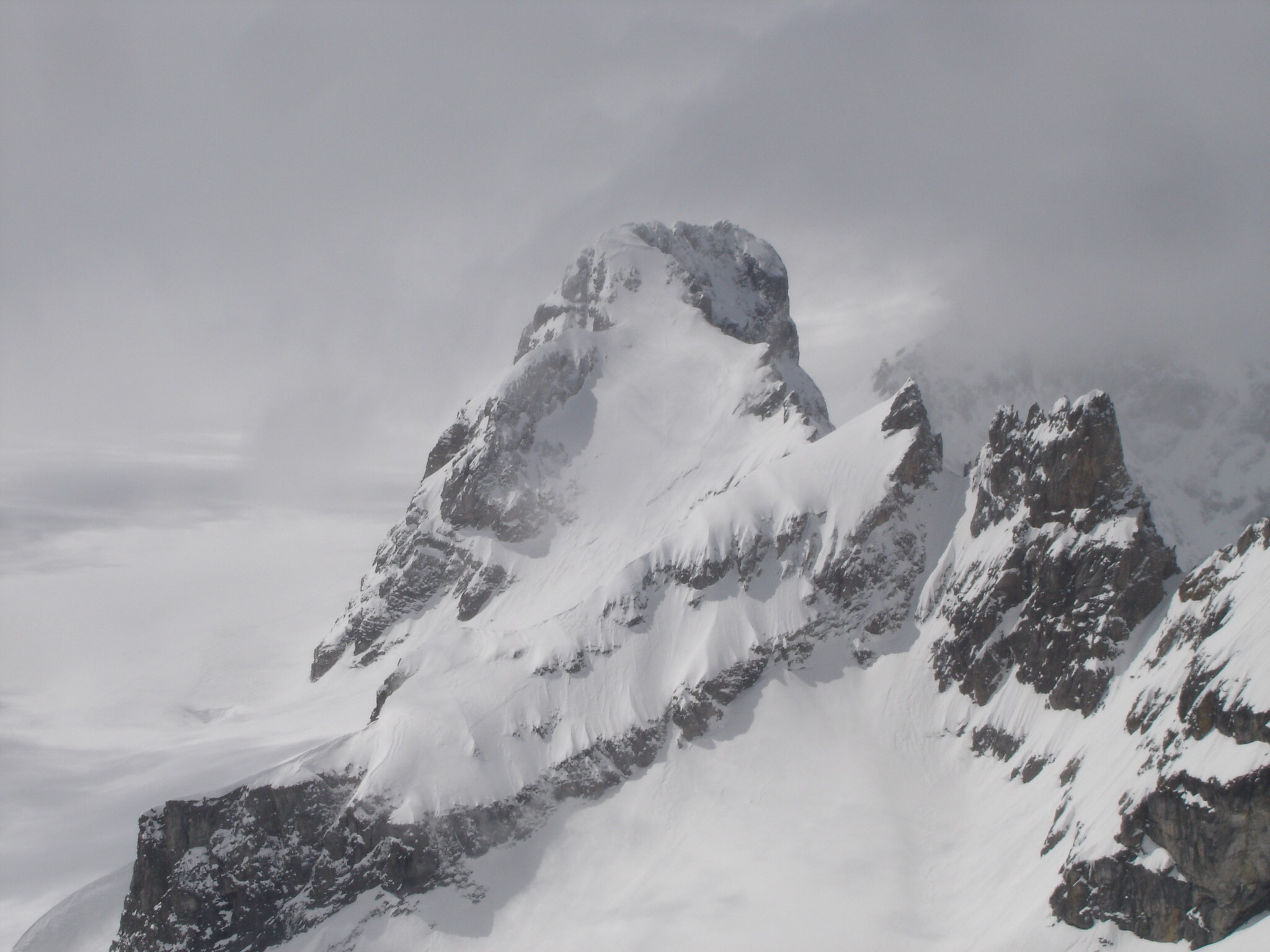
- View from the Gemsfairenstock (north-east side)

Highest point
- Elevation: 3,079 m (10,102 ft)
- Prominence: 179 m (587 ft)
- Parent peak: Schärhorn
- Coordinates: 46°50′57″N 8°53′37″E

Geography
- Location within Switzerland Location within Canton of Glarus Location within Canton of Uri
- Country: Switzerland
- Cantons: Glarus / Uri
- Parent range: Glarus Alps

The Bocktschingel is a mountain of the Glarus Alps, located on the border between the Swiss cantons of Uri and Glarus. It lies south-east of the Klausen Pass, on the range east of the Clariden.

== See also ==
- List of mountains of the canton of Glarus
