= Hermann Fischer-Sigwart =

Swiss naturalist, conservationist and pharmacist

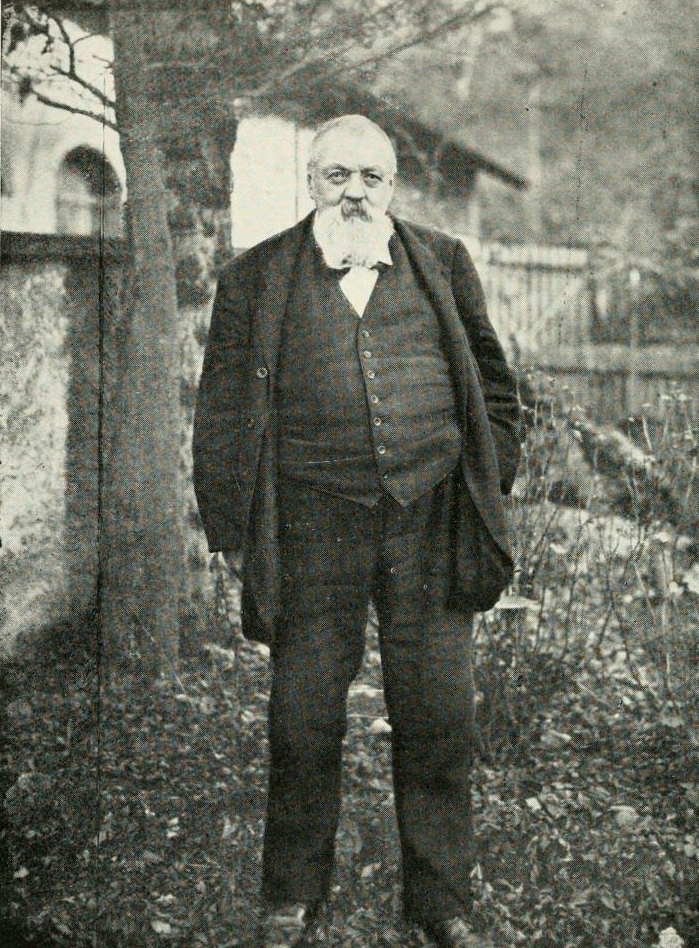
In 1917

Hermann Fischer-Sigwart (23 March 1842 – 23 July 1925) was a Swiss naturalist and conservationist who was a pharmacist by profession. He wrote several books on natural history and founded a museum in his hometown Zofingen.

Fischer-Sigwart was educated at Zofingen and then worked in his father's pharmacy as an apprentice. He then worked at the Karlsruhe pharmacy and studies at the University of Jena where he was influenced by the botanist Matthias Jacob Schleiden. He then worked in Neuchatel, followed by the Golden Pharmacy in Basel and then returned to manage his father's business in Zofingen. In 1903 he sold off his business and went to live in Rebberg where he was in close contact with nature. He began to make collections of specimens, and maintained terrariums with reptiles and amphibians. He published several notes from his observations. His studies led to an honorary doctorate in 1896 from the University of Zurich. This also led to his founding a museum of natural history in Zofinger. He published several popular articles and some books including "Tierleben im Aquarium" (animal life in the aquarium), "Betrachtungen über Amphibien und Reptilien" (reflections on amphibians and reptiles) and "Das Gebirge als Rückzugsgebiet für die Tierwelt" (mountains as a retreat for animals). He was involved in conservation of the Swiss wilderness. He was one of the founders of the Schweizerische Naturschutzkommission along with Paul Sarasin, Jakob Heierli, Albert Heim, Hans Schardt, Carl Schroter, Ernest Wiczek, and Friedrich Zschokke.
