= Piz Dolf =

Mountain in Switzerland

- Trinserhorn
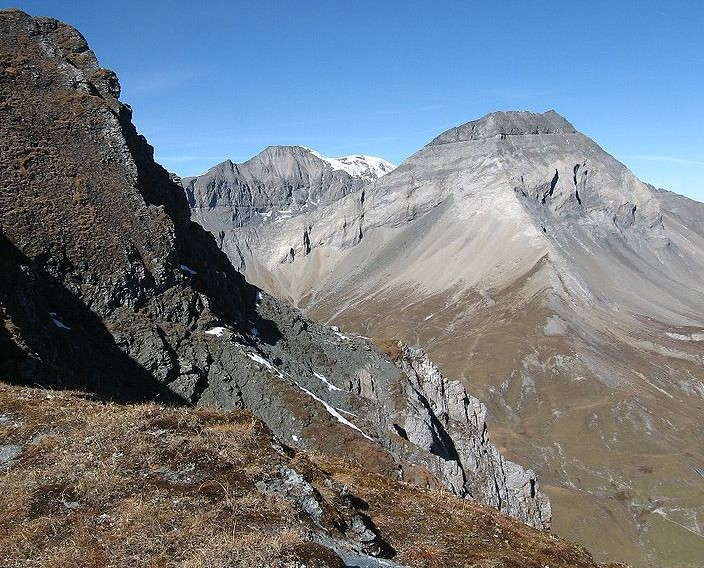
- Piz Dolf right and Piz Segnas (left) seen from Fil de Cassons (which is from southeast) showing the "Glarus thrust" fault in its peak. The photo is taken standing on the same line, indicated by the green rock above the much brighter rock at the bottom of the foreground.

Highest point
- Elevation: 3,028 m (9,934 ft)
- Prominence: 250 m (820 ft)
- Parent peak: Piz Segnas
- Coordinates: 46°54′11.5″N 9°15′59.9″E

Geography
- Location within Switzerland Location within Canton of Grisons Location within Canton of St. Gallen
- Location: St. Gallen/Grisons
- Country: Switzerland
- Parent range: Glarus Alps

Climbing
- Easiest route: To Fuorcla Raschaglius and along Segnes Glacier to the north-westerly face and to the summit.

Piz Dolf (Romansh) or Trinserhorn (German) is a mountain of the Glarus Alps, located on the border between the cantons of St. Gallen and Grisons (Graubünden).

Piz Sardona is to the north across a glacier, and to its west Piz Segnas. Both Piz Segnas and Piz Dolf show the line of the Glarus thrust in its upper part. The easiest access to the area is an aerial cableway to Fil de Cassons from Flims or any of various hikes to this ridge lying southeast of Piz Dolf. One route uses the ascent via Val Bargis.

== See also ==
- List of mountains of Graubünden
- List of mountains of the canton of St. Gallen
