= Muttenstock =

Mountain in Switzerland

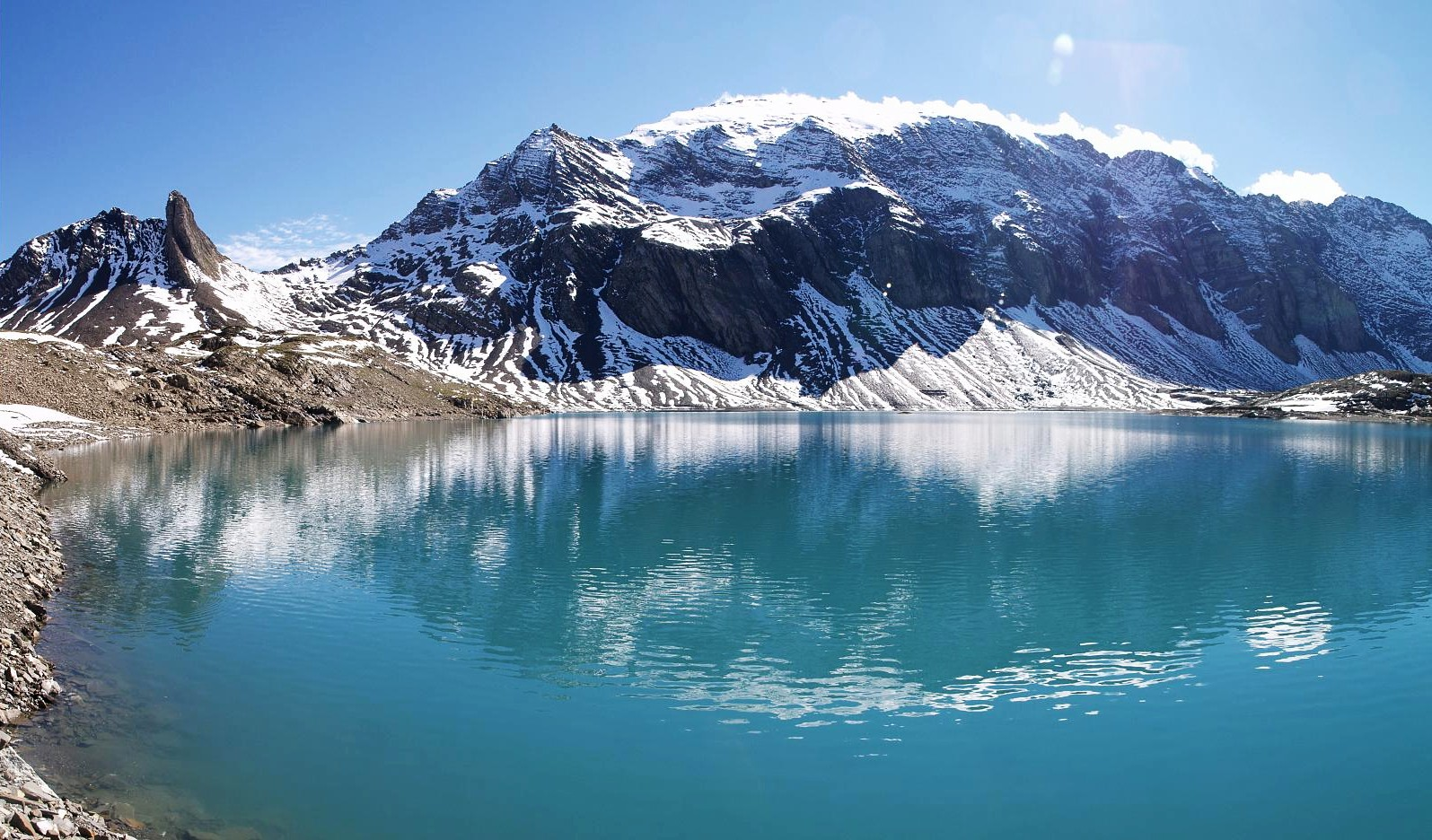
- Muttsee and Mount Ruchi (3,107 m [10,194 ft]) in the center of the image, Muttenstock on the right edge of the image

Highest point
- Elevation: 3,089 m (10,135 ft)
- Prominence: 103 m (338 ft)
- Parent peak: Ruchi
- Coordinates: 46°50′59.5″N 9°2′45″E

Geography
- Location within Switzerland Location within Canton of Glarus Location within Canton of Grisons
- Location: Glarus/Grisons
- Country: Switzerland
- Parent range: Glarus Alps

The Muttenstock is a mountain in the Glarus Alps, located on the border between the cantons of Glarus and Grisons (Graubünden). It overlooks three lakes: Limmernsee and Muttsee on the west side, and Lag da Pigniu on the east side. The Muttenstock is situated a few kilometres north of the Kisten Pass (2,503 m [8,212 ft]).

== See also ==
- List of mountains of Graubünden
- List of mountains of the canton of Glarus
