= Hochmättli =

Mountain in Switzerland

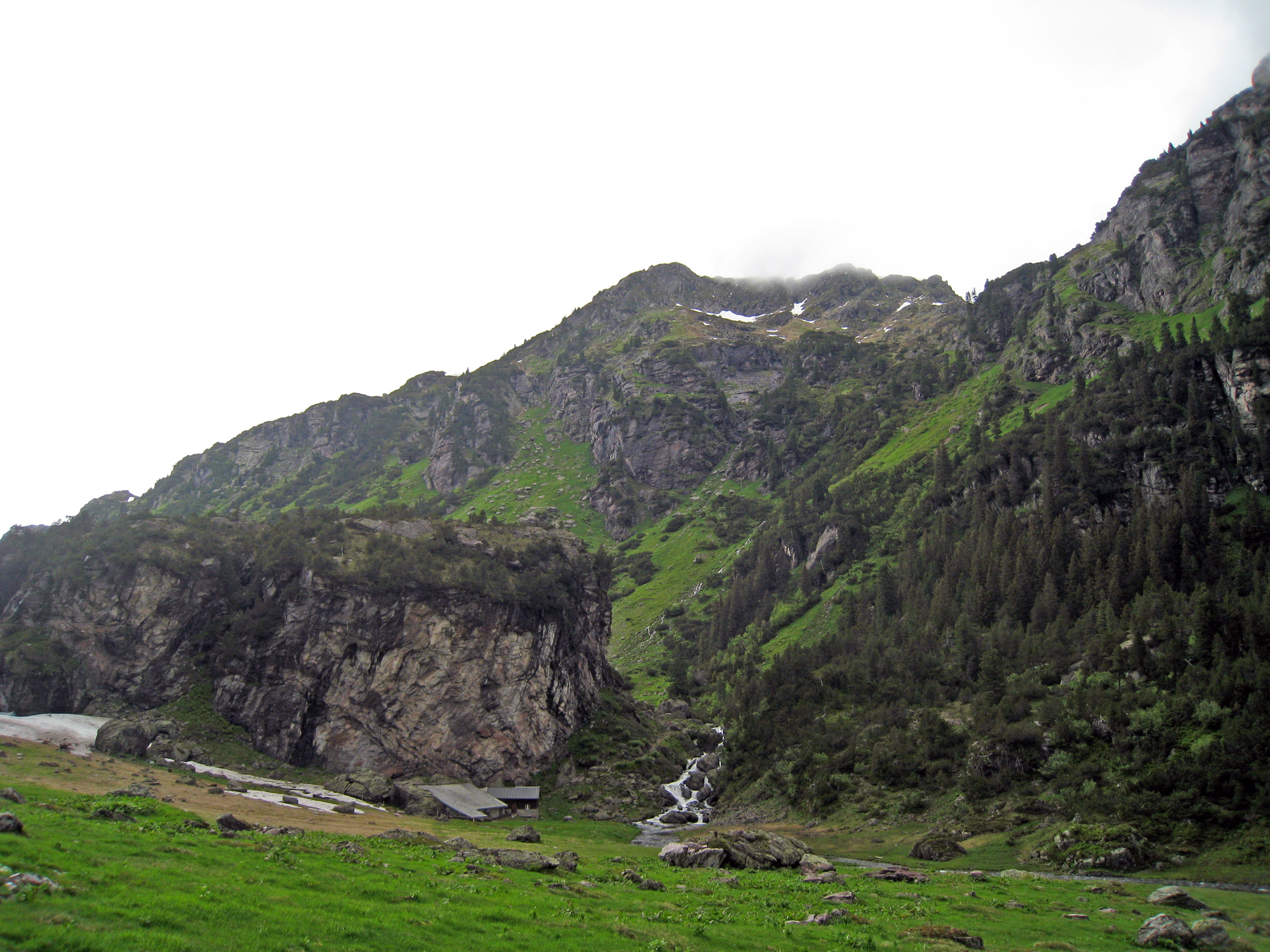

Highest point
- Elevation: 2,252 m (7,388 ft)
- Prominence: 267 m (876 ft)
- Parent peak: Gufelstock
- Coordinates: 47°03′09″N 9°10′22″E

Geography
- Location within Switzerland Location within Canton of Glarus Location within Canton of St. Gallen
- Country: Switzerland
- Cantons: Glarus / St. Gallen
- Parent range: Glarus Alps

The Hochmättli is a mountain of the Glarus Alps, located on the border between the Swiss cantons of Glarus and St. Gallen. It lies in the Murgtal, near the Murgsee, south of the Walensee.

== See also ==
- List of mountains of the canton of Glarus
- List of mountains of the canton of St. Gallen
