= Nüschenstock =

Mountain in Switzerland

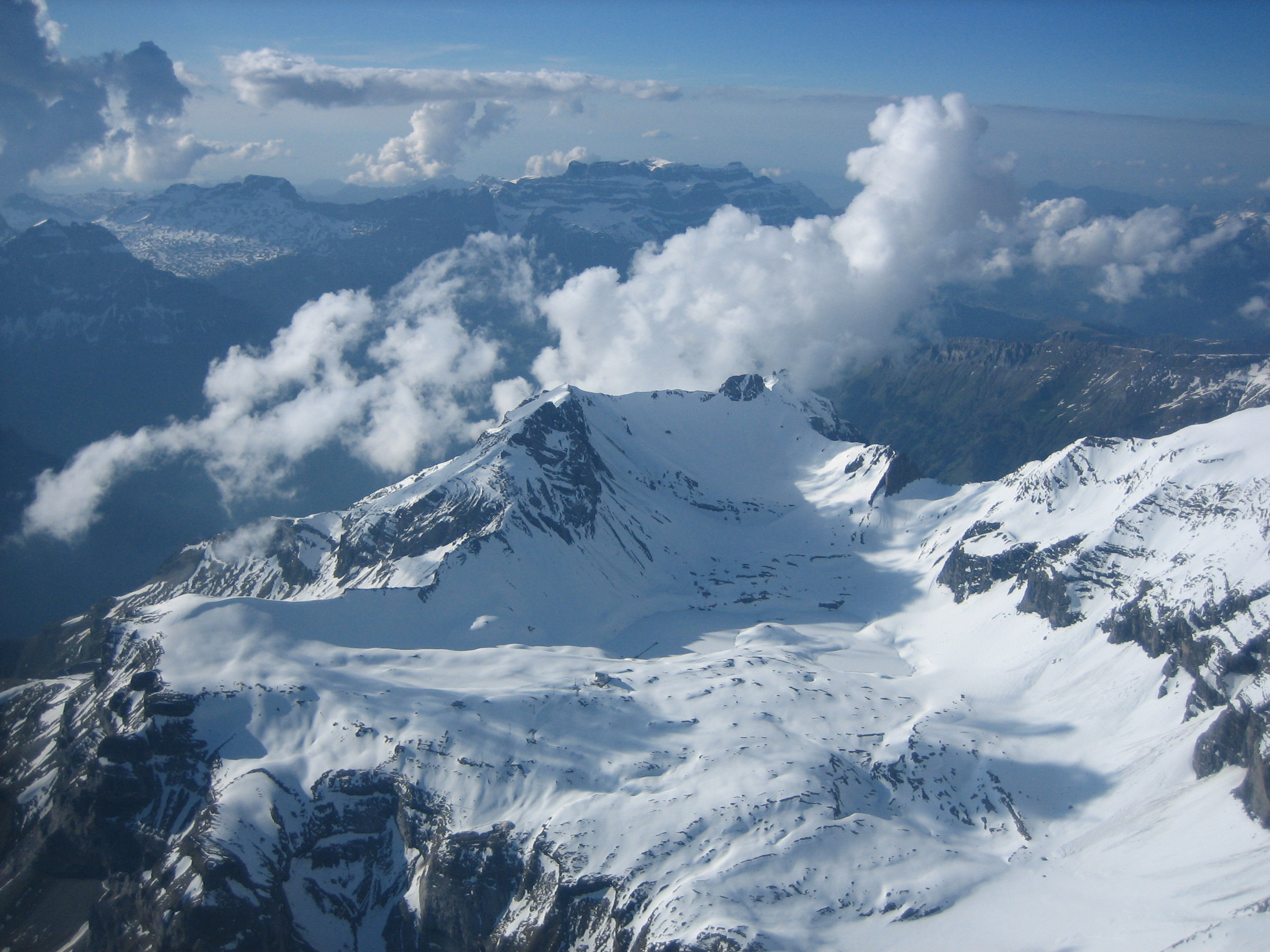
- The Nüschenstock (centre left) with the ice covered Muttsee

Highest point
- Elevation: 2,893 m (9,491 ft)
- Prominence: 248 m (814 ft)
- Parent peak: Hausstock
- Coordinates: 46°52′06″N 9°01′05.5″E

Geography
- Location within Switzerland Location within Canton of Glarus
- Country: Switzerland
- Canton: Glarus
- Parent range: Glarus Alps

The Nüschenstock is a mountain of the Glarus Alps, located south of Linthal in canton of Glarus, Switzerland. On its eastern side it overlooks the Muttsee.

== See also ==
- List of mountains of the canton of Glarus
