= Laaxer Stöckli =

Mountain in Switzerland

- Piz Grisch
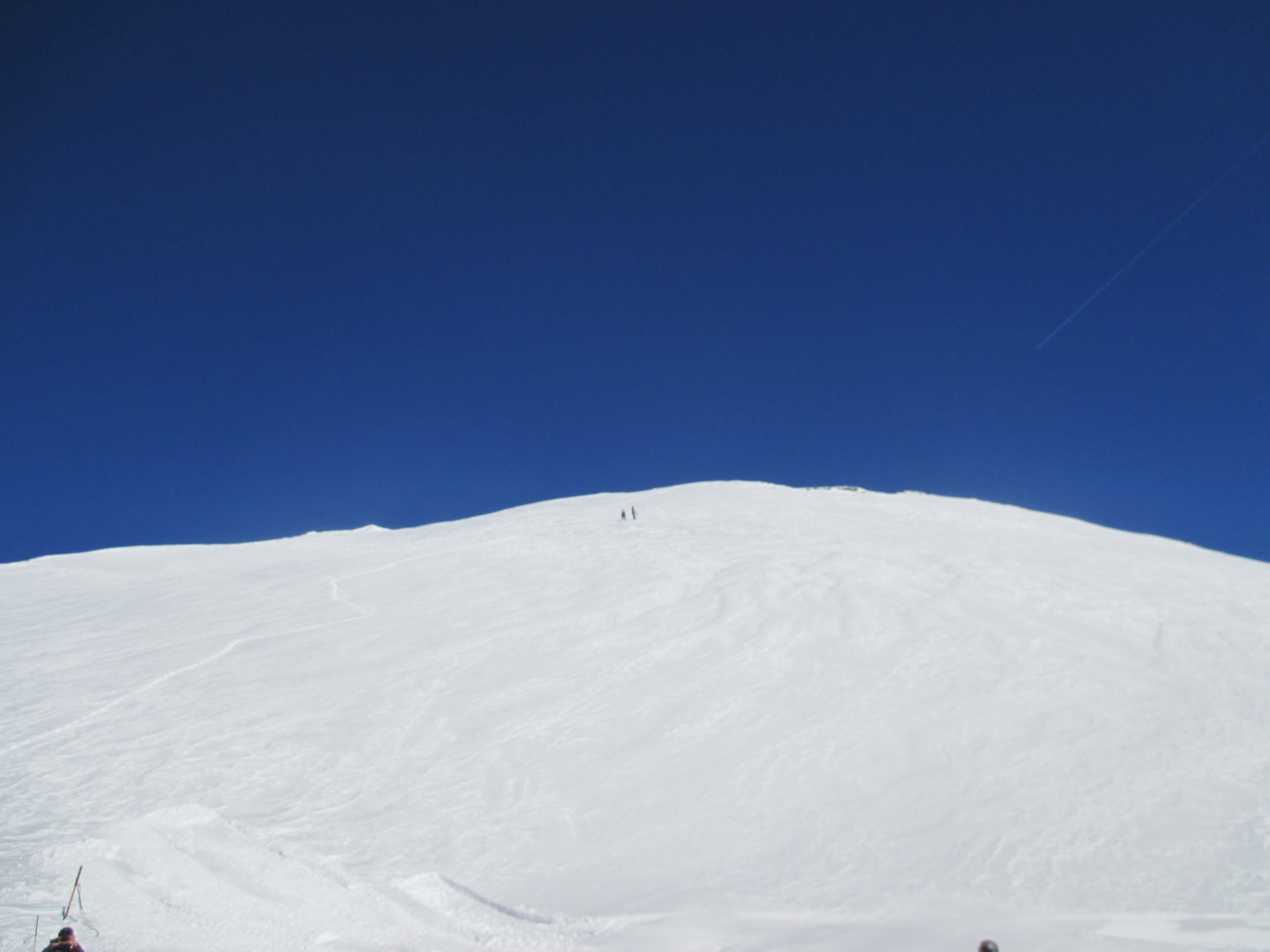
- The summit seen from La Siala

Highest point
- Elevation: 2,898 m (9,508 ft)
- Prominence: 271 m (889 ft)
- Parent peak: Piz Segnas
- Coordinates: 46°52′59″N 9°12′15″E

Geography
- Location within Switzerland Location within Canton of Glarus Location within Canton of Grisons
- Country: Switzerland
- Cantons: Glarus / Grisons
- Parent range: Glarus Alps

The Laaxer Stöckli, also known as Piz Grisch, is a 2,898 metres (9,508 ft) high mountain of the Glarus Alps, located on the border between the cantons of Glarus (GL) and Grisons (Graubünden, GR) in Eastern Switzerland. It lies approximately halfway between the Vorab and Piz Segnas.

The Laaxer Stöckli belongs to the municipalities of Glarus Süd (GL) and Laax (GR). The closest localities are Elm (GL) and Flims (GR). The south side is part of the Flims-Laax ski area. A gondola lift from Alp Sogn Martin reaches La Siala at a height of 2,806 metres (9,206 ft).

== See also ==
- List of mountains of Graubünden
- List of mountains of the canton of Glarus
