= Planura Hut =

Mountain hut of the Swiss Alpine Club

Coordinates: 46°49′12″N 8°52′49″E

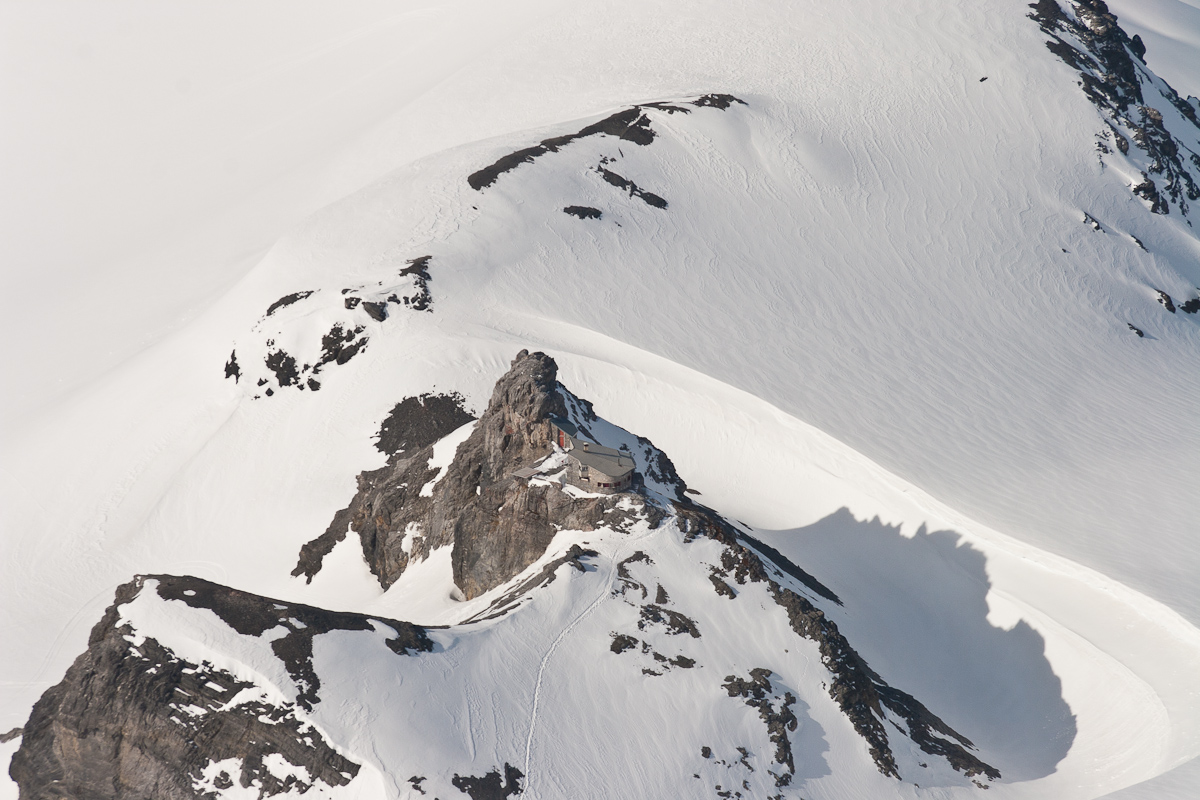
The Planura Hut with the Hüfi Glacier in background

The Planura Hut (German: Planurahütte) is a mountain hut of the Swiss Alpine Club, located on the border between the cantons of Uri and Glarus, between Amsteg and Linthal. It lies at a height of 2,947 metres above sea level, on the watershed between the Hüfi Glacier and the Sandfirn.

The Planura Hut is used for the ascents of the Tödi, Schärhorn, Clariden, Düssi, Chammliberg and Gemsfairenstock.
