= Piz Cazarauls =

Mountain in Switzerland

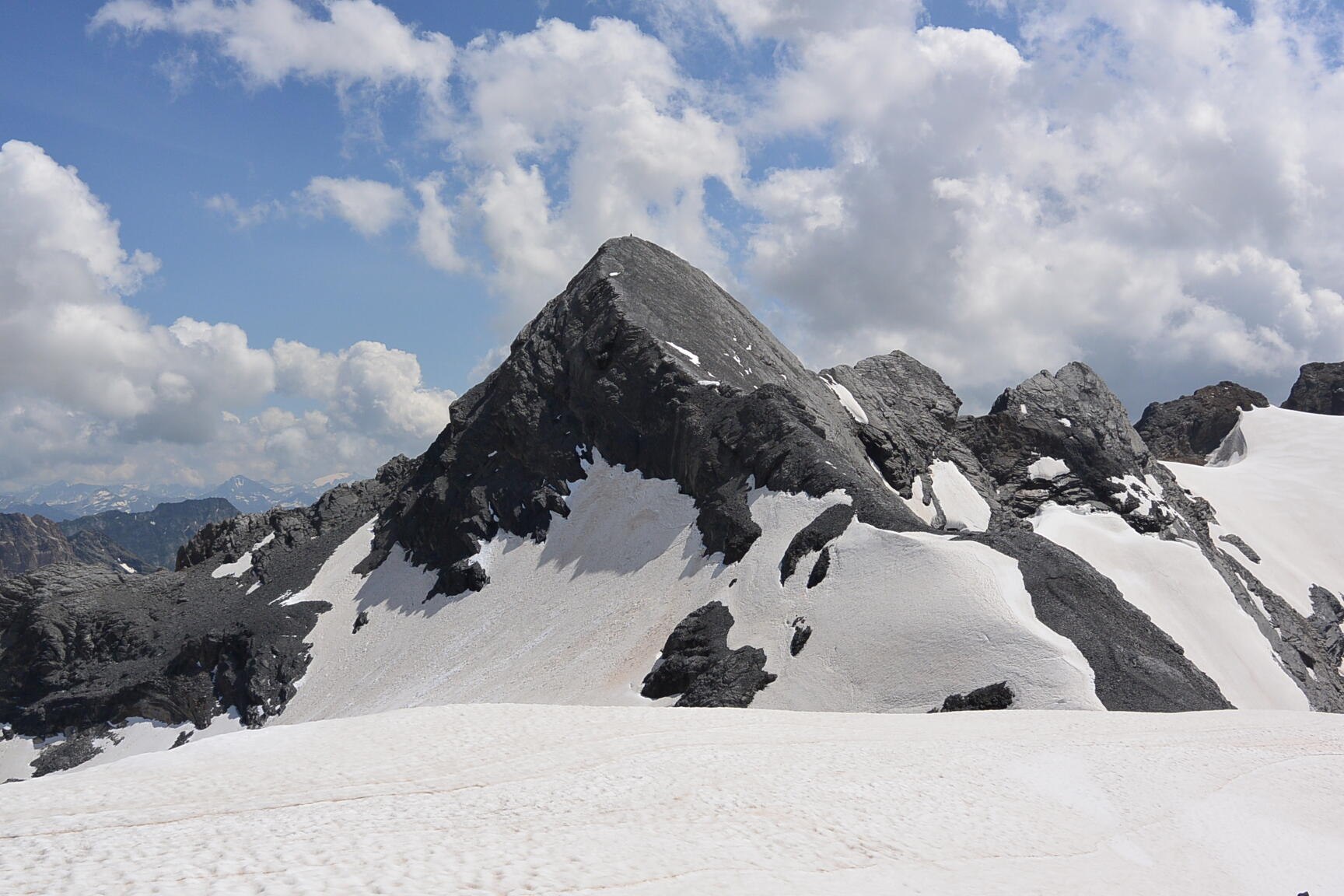

Highest point
- Elevation: 3,063 m (10,049 ft)
- Prominence: 63 m (207 ft)
- Parent peak: Heimstock
- Coordinates: 46°48′46.6″N 8°52′37.6″E

Geography
- Location within Switzerland Location within Canton of Glarus Location within Canton of Grisons Location within Canton of Uri
- Country: Switzerland
- Cantons: Grisons / Glarus / Uri

Piz Cazarauls is a 3,063 metres (10,049 ft) high mountain in the Glarus Alps in Switzerland. The summit is the tripoint between the cantons of Uri, Glarus and Grisons (Graubünden). Piz Cazarauls lies between the valleys of Maderanertal, Linth and Val Russein.

== See also ==
- List of mountains of Graubünden
- List of mountains of Uri
- List of mountains of the canton of Glarus
