= Vorab =

Mountain in Switzerland

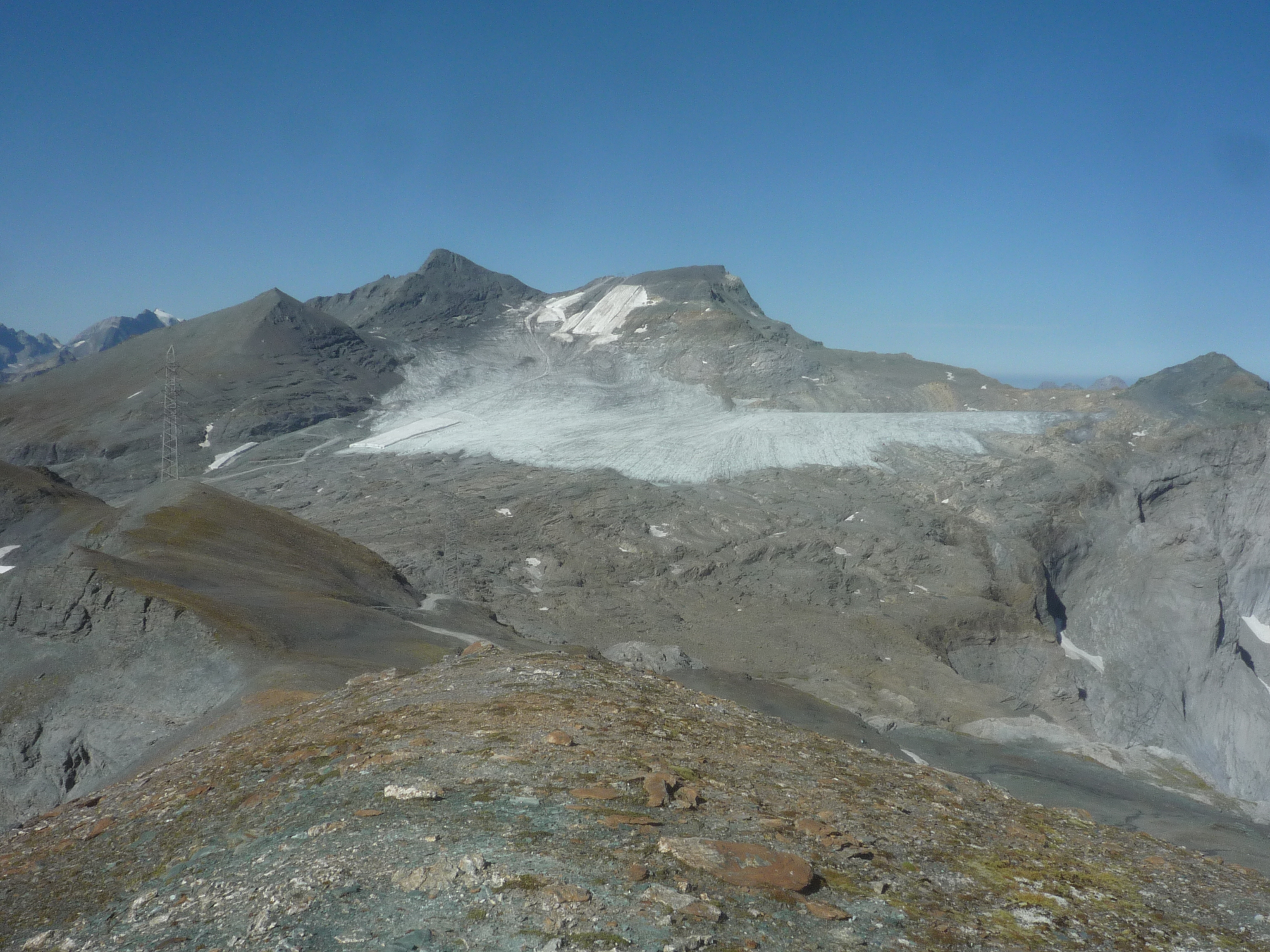
- Vorab and glacier as seen from Piz Grisch

Highest point
- Peak: Bündner Vorab
- Elevation: 3,028 m (9,934 ft)
- Prominence: 408 m (1,339 ft)
- Parent peak: Piz Segnas
- Listing: Alpine mountains above 3000 m
- Coordinates: 46°52′26.5″N 9°9′23.6″E

Geography
- Location within Switzerland Location within Canton of Glarus Location within Canton of Grisons
- Country: Switzerland
- Cantons: Glarus / Grisons
- Parent range: Glarus Alps

The Vorab is a double summit mountain of the Glarus Alps, located on the border between the cantons of Glarus (GL) and Grisons (Graubünden, GR), Switzerland. The summit (3,028 m [9,934 ft]) is also named Bündner Vorab (lit. 'League's Vorab', referring to Graubünden) to distinguish it from a lower summit (3,018 m [9,902 ft]) named Glarner Vorab (lit. 'Vorab of Glarus').

Territorially, it divides on the municipal areas of Laax (GR) on its eastern face, a narrow southern stripe within Siat (GR) and Elm (GL) on its northwestern face. The secondary peaks that belong to the massive include also the municipalities of Ruschein and Panix in Grisons.

== Glacier ==
The Vorab Glacier runs down the mountain's eastern face, where the valley continues a moderate inclination down towards Flims, where the glacier can be seen, for example, from Lake Cauma. It cannot be seen from the adjacent municipalities on the south, though. The northwestern face, however, consists of a sheer drop towards Elm.

== Transport ==
Since 1979, there is a top station of a platter lift near the Glarner Vorab. This comes up from the terminal station of a gondola lift ending at the edge of the glacier, all of these installations belong to the ski resort of Flims-Laax-Falera, which uses the name of Laax only for winter marketing.

== Gallery ==
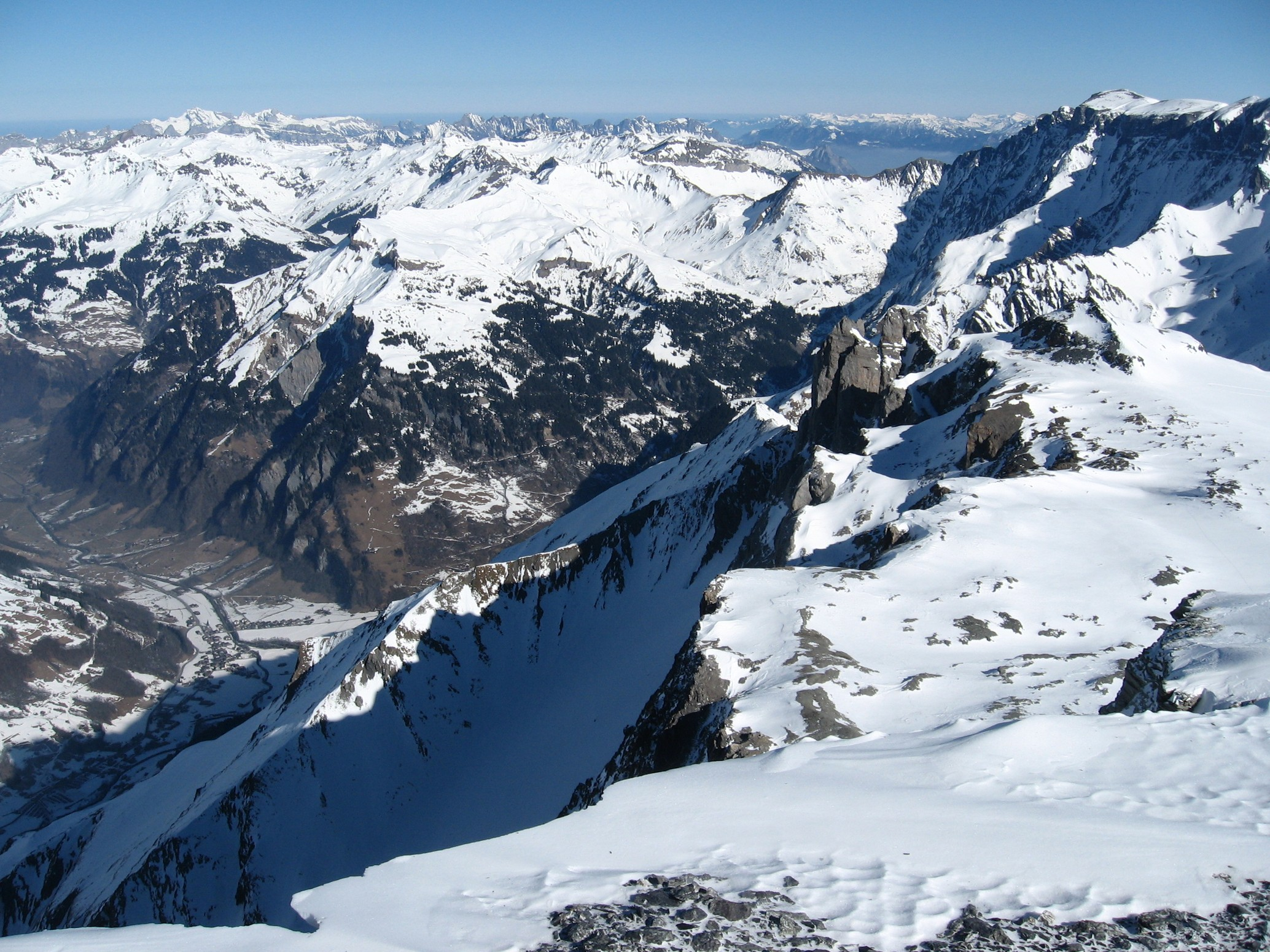
Northern face of Glarner Vorab, Gletscherhorn in the foreground, down in the valley lies Elm

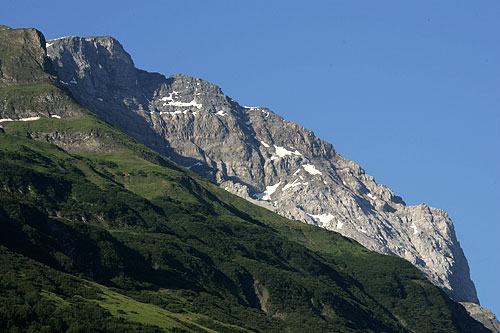
Northern face of Glarner Vorab

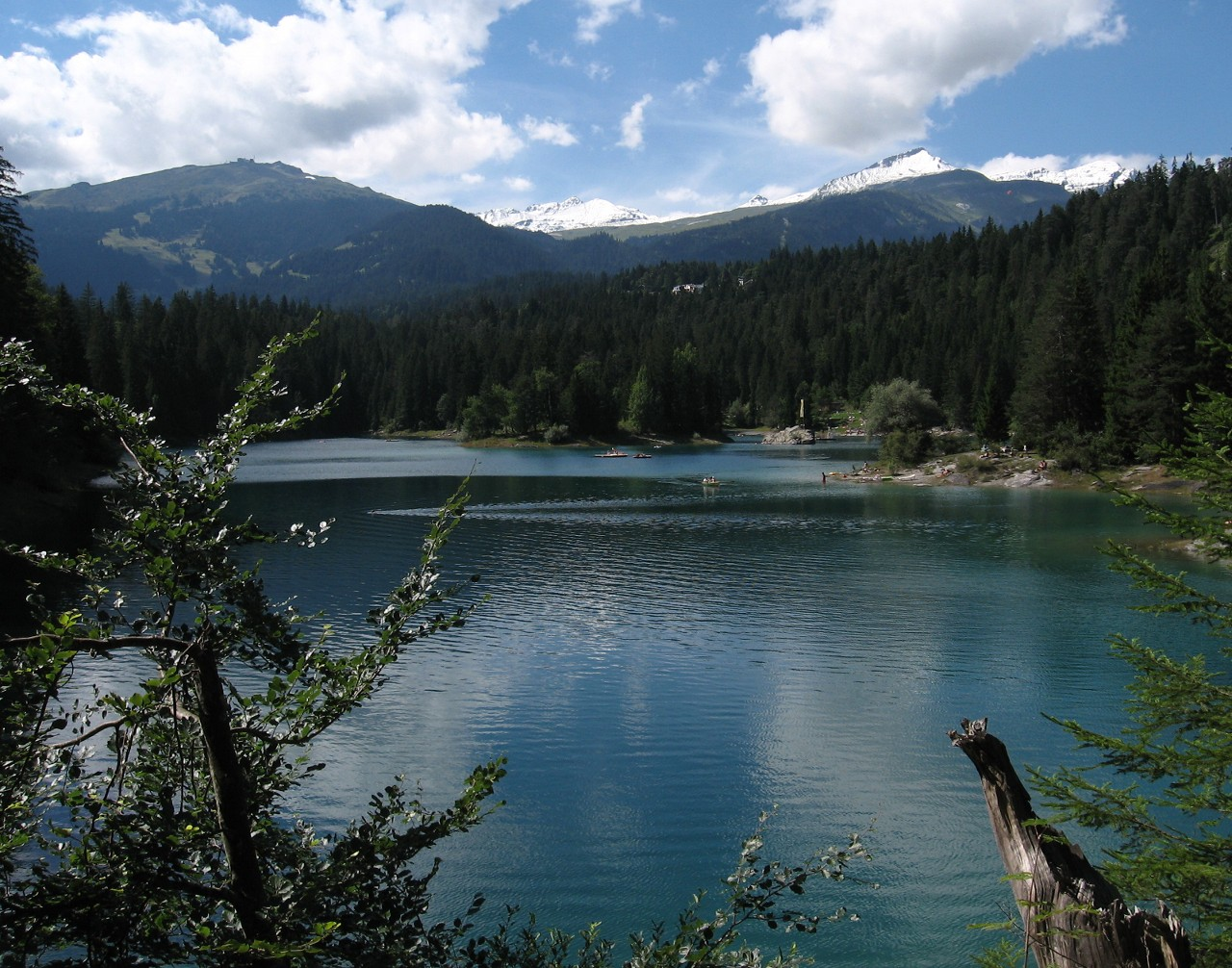
Foreground: Lake Cauma and Flims Forest. Background: Crap Sogn Gion (left) and Vorab (white mountain, right). White triangel is Crap Ner, white peak is Ofen (TektonikArena Sardona)

== See also ==
- List of mountains of Graubünden
- List of mountains of the canton of Glarus
