= Siwellen =

Mountain in Switzerland

- Location within Switzerland Location within Canton of Glarus

Highest point
- Elevation: 2,307 m (7,569 ft)
- Prominence: 91 m (299 ft)
- Parent peak: Gufelstock
- Coordinates: 47°2′55″N 9°7′5″E

Geography
- Country: Switzerland
- Canton: Glarus
- Parent range: Glarus Alps

The Siwellen (2,307 m [7,569 ft]) is a mountain of the Glarus Alps, located east of the town of Glarus in the canton of Glarus. It lies on the range between the Linth valley and the Murgtal, north of the Gufelstock.

== See also ==
- List of mountains of the canton of Glarus
