= List of mountains of the canton of Glarus =

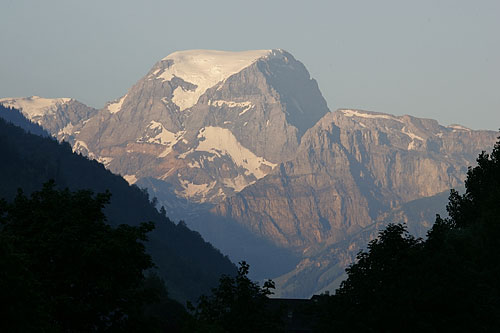
The Tödi (Piz Russein), the highest mountain of the Glarus Alps, in July 2006.

This is a list of mountains of the Swiss canton of Glarus. Glarus is a mountainous canton and lies entirely within the Alps. It is also one of the five cantons having summits above 3,600 m (11,800 ft). Topographically, the most important summit of the canton is that of the Tödi (most elevated, most prominent and most isolated).

All mountain heights and prominences on the list are from the largest-scale maps available.

== Topographic prominence of 150 metres or more ==
This list only includes significant summits with a topographic prominence of at least 150 metres (492 ft). There are over 40 such summits in Glarus and they are found in all its three municipalities.

Mountain	Height (m)	Drop (m)	Coordinates	Range	Municipality(ies)	First ascent	Notes
Tödi (Piz Russein)	3614	1570	46°48′40″N 08°54′53″E	Glarus Alps	Glarus Süd	1824	Summit located on the border with the canton of Grisons
Bifertenstock/Piz Durschin	3419	383	46°48′16″N 08°57′27″E	Glarus Alps	Glarus Süd	1863	Summit located on the border with the canton of Grisons
Clariden	3267	413	46°50′31″N 08°52′17″E	Glarus Alps	Glarus Süd	1863	Summit located on the border with the canton of Uri
Hausstock	3158	655	46°52′28″N 09°03′56″E	Glarus Alps	Glarus Süd	1832	Summit located on the border with the canton of Grisons
Ruchi	3107	170	46°51′55″N 09°02′43″E	Glarus Alps	Glarus Süd		Summit located on the border with the canton of Grisons
Piz Segnas	3099	607	46°54′28″N 09°14′23″E	Glarus Alps	Glarus Süd	1861	Summit located on the border with the canton of Grisons
Bocktschingel	3079	179	46°50′57″N 08°53′37″E	Glarus Alps	Glarus Süd		Summit located on the border with the canton of Uri
Selbsanft	3029	180	46°49′54″N 08°58′42″E	Glarus Alps	Glarus Süd		
Bündner Vorab	3028	408	46°52′26″N 09°09′24″E	Glarus Alps	Glarus Süd	1842	Summit located on the border with the canton of Grisons
Glärnisch	2915	967	46°59′42″N 08°59′43″E	Schwyzer Alps	Glarus/Glarus Süd		
Laaxer Stöckli	2898	271	46°52′59″N 9°12′15″E	Glarus Alps	Glarus Süd		Summit located on the border with the canton of Grisons
Nüschenstock	2893	248	46°52′06″N 09°01′05.5″E	Glarus Alps	Glarus Süd		
Mättlenstöck	2808	159	46°53′15.5″N 09°03′57.5″E	Glarus Alps	Glarus Süd		
Bös Fulen	2802	367	46°58′02″N 08°56′45″E	Schwyzer Alps	Glarus		Summit located on the border with the canton of Schwyz
Kärpf	2794	533	46°55′00″N 09°05′36″E	Glarus Alps	Glarus Süd		
Ortstock	2716	538	46°55′31″N 08°56′53″E	Schwyzer Alps	Glarus Süd		Summit located on the border with the canton of Schwyz
Rüchigrat	2657	222	46°58′45″N 8°58′38″E	Schwyzer Alps	Glarus/Glarus Süd		
Foostock/Ruchen	2611	388	46°57′24″N 09°14′41″E	Glarus Alps	Glarus Süd		Summit located on the border with the canton of St. Gallen
Magerrain	2524	357	47°01′59″N 09°13′12″E	Glarus Alps	Glarus Süd		Summit located on the border with the canton of St. Gallen
Gulderstock	2511	239	46°59′36″N 09°12′05″E	Glarus Alps	Glarus Süd		
Bützistock	2496	261	47°01′44″N 09°10′30.8″E	Glarus Alps	Glarus Süd		Summit located on the border with the canton of St. Gallen
Wissgandstöckli	2488	357	46°59′42.5″N 09°14′59.6″E	Glarus Alps	Glarus Süd		Summit located on the border with the canton of St. Gallen
Blistock	2448	214	46°55′53″N 09°07′13″E	Glarus Alps	Glarus Süd		
Mürtschenstock (Ruchen)	2441	601	47°04′10″N 09°08′41″E	Glarus Alps	Glarus Nord		
Gufelstock	2436	423	47°01′30″N 09°08′48″E	Glarus Alps	Glarus Süd		
Vorder Glärnisch	2327	267	47°01′19″N 09°02′28″E	Schwyzer Alps	Glarus/Glarus Süd		
Gandstock	2315	161	46°55′45″N 09°07′01″E	Glarus Alps	Glarus Süd		
Mutteristock (Redertenstock)	2295	745	47°02′54″N 08°56′35″E	Schwyzer Alps	Glarus		Summit located on the border with the canton of Schwyz
Rautispitz	2283	465	47°04′16″N 09°00′42″E	Schwyzer Alps	Glarus/Glarus Nord		
Hochmättli	2252	267	47°03′09″N 09°10′22″E	Glarus Alps	Glarus Nord		Summit located on the border with the canton of St. Gallen
Brünnelistock	2133	250	47°05′03″N 08°58′21″E	Schwyzer Alps	Glarus Nord		Summit located on the border with the canton of Schwyz
Fronalpstock	2124	272	47°04′07.3″N 09°06′31.9″E	Glarus Alps	Glarus/Glarus Nord		
Zindlenspitz	2097	195	47°4′34.5″N 8°57′36″E	Schwyzer Alps	Glarus Nord		Summit located on the border with the canton of Schwyz
Chöpfenberg	1896	465	47°07′07″N 08°58′07″E	Schwyzer Alps	Glarus Nord		Summit located on the border with the canton of Schwyz
Planggenstock	1675	251	47°07′59″N 8°59′37″E	Schwyzer Alps	Glarus Nord		

== Topographic prominence of less than 150 metres ==
Mountain	Height (m)	Drop (m)	Coordinates	Range	District(s)	First ascent	Notes
Piz Urlaun	3358	99	46°47′47.3″N 08°55′41.2″E	Glarus Alps	Glarus Süd		Summit located on the border with the canton of Grisons
Muttenstock	3089	103	46°50′59.5″N 9°2′45″E	Glarus Alps	Glarus Süd		Summit located on the border with the canton of Grisons
Schibe	3083	124	46°49′07″N 8°58′18″E	Glarus Alps	Glarus Süd		
Piz Cazarauls	3063	63	46°48′46.6″N 08°52′37.6″E	Glarus Alps	Glarus Süd		Summit located on the tripoint with the cantons of Grisons and Uri
Piz Sardona	3056	113	46°55′22.2″N 09°15′5.4″E	Glarus Alps	Glarus Süd		Summit located on the border with the canton of St. Gallen
Gemsfairenstock	2972	124	46°51′38″N 08°55′4″E	Glarus Alps	Glarus Süd		Summit located on the border with the canton of Uri
Tschingelhörner	2849	109	46°55′11″N 8°56′06″E	Glarus Alps	Glarus Süd		Summit located on the border with the canton of Grisons
Schijen (Glarus Alps)	2610	110	46°55′11″N 8°56′06″E	Glarus Alps	Glarus Süd		Summit located on the tripoint with the cantons of Schwyz and Uri
Spitzmeilen	2501	86	47°01′26.5″N 09°14′11″E	Glarus Alps	Glarus Süd		Summit located on the border with the canton of St. Gallen
Hinterer Eggstock	2455	91	46°57′37″N 8°58′0″E	Schwyzer Alps	Glarus Süd		Summit located on the border with the canton of Schwyz
Siwellen	2307	91	47°02′55″N 09°07′05″E	Glarus Alps	Glarus		
Schilt	2299	58	47°02′39.5″N 09°06′44″E	Glarus Alps	Glarus		
Schijen (Schwyzer Alps)	2259	120	47°03′33.5″N 08°59′30.6″E	Schwyzer Alps	Glarus/Glarus Nord		
Schiberg	2044	144	47°05′33″N 8°57′13″E	Schwyzer Alps	Glarus Nord		Summit located on the border with the canton of Schwyz

== See also ==
- List of mountains of Switzerland
- Swiss Alps
