= Vorab Glacier =

Glacier in Switzerland

Coordinates: 46°52′43″N 9°9′49″E

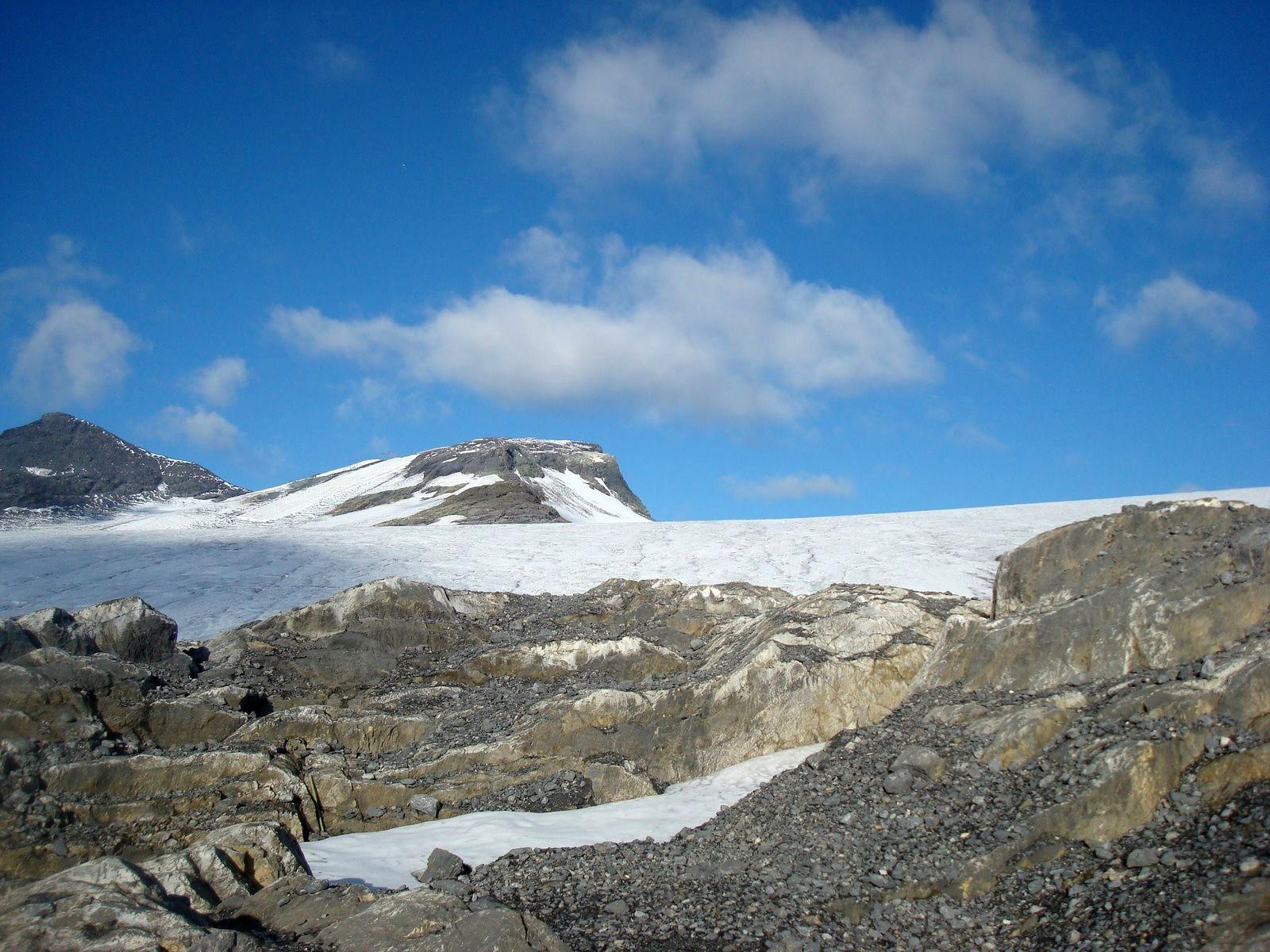
Vorab Glacier

The Vorab Glacier (German: Vorabgletscher, rarely Vorabfiren, Romansh: Glatscher dil Vorab) is a 2 km long glacier (as of 2005) situated in the Glarus Alps in the cantons of Glarus and Graubünden. It lies on the east side of the Vorab, between 2,600 and 3,000 metres above sea level. In 1973 it had an area of 2.17 km^{2}., and is receding today.

The glacier is part of the Flims-Laax ski resort complex, and may be skied in the winter.

== See also ==
- List of glaciers in Switzerland
- Swiss Alps
