= Tschingelhörner =

Mountain in Switzerland

- Grosses Tschingelhorn
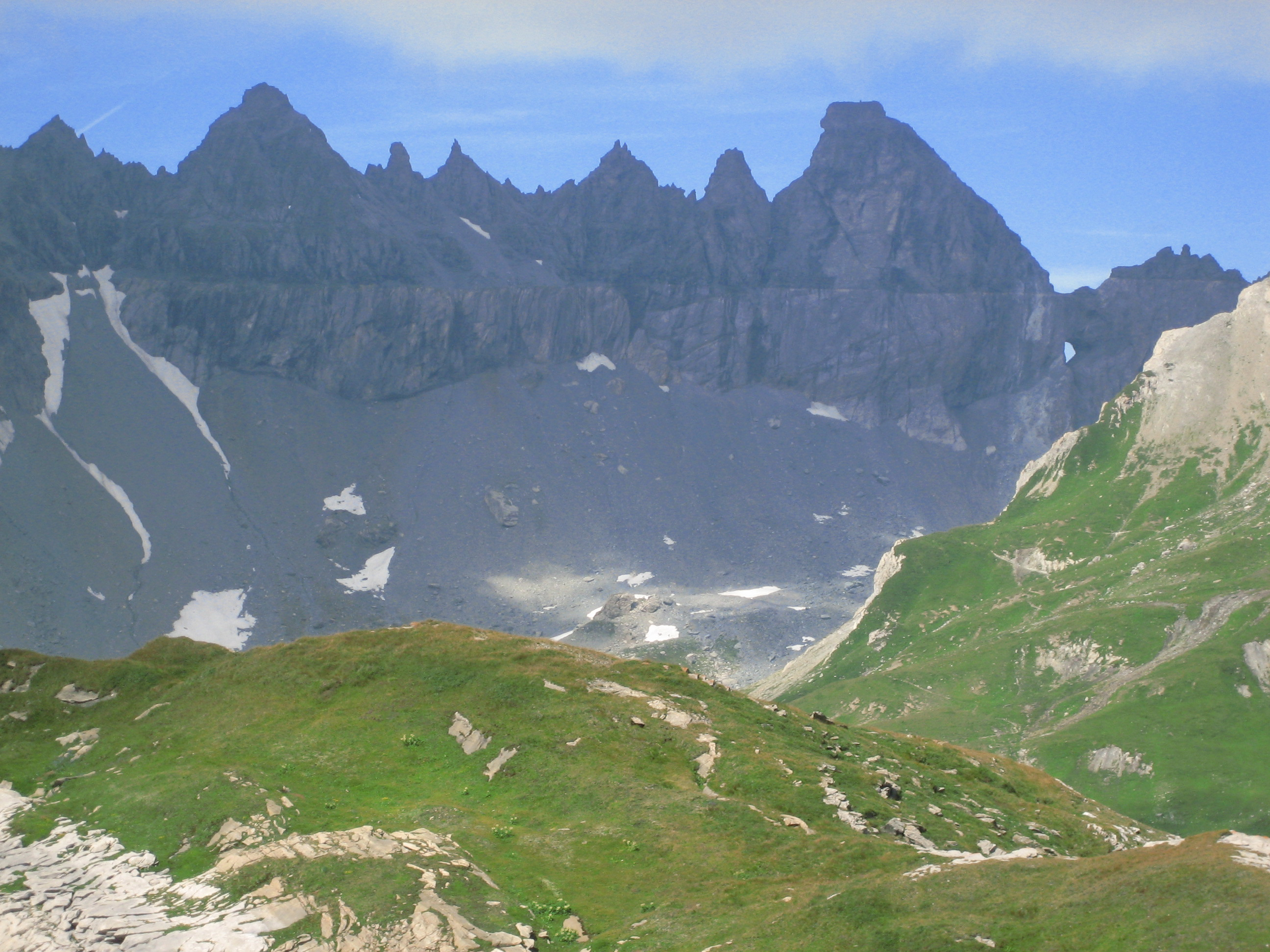
- The Tschingelhörner (main summit on the right) with the Martinsloch visible on the right

Highest point
- Elevation: 2,849 m (9,347 ft)
- Prominence: 109 m (358 ft)
- Parent peak: Piz Grisch
- Coordinates: 46°53′53.8″N 9°13′16.8″E

Geography
- Location within Switzerland Location within Canton of Glarus Location within Canton of Grisons
- Country: Switzerland
- Cantons: Glarus / Grisons
- Parent range: Glarus Alps

The Tschingelhörner (also spelled Tschingelhoren) are a chain of mountain peaks in the Glarus Alps, located on the border between the Swiss cantons of Glarus and Grisons (Graubünden). They are composed of several summits on a 1 km (0.62 mi) long ridge, of which the highest is named Grosses Tschingelhorn (2,849 m [9,347 ft]). The mountain is located between Elm (Glarus) and Flims (Grisons), west of the Segnas Pass (2,627 m [8,619 ft]).

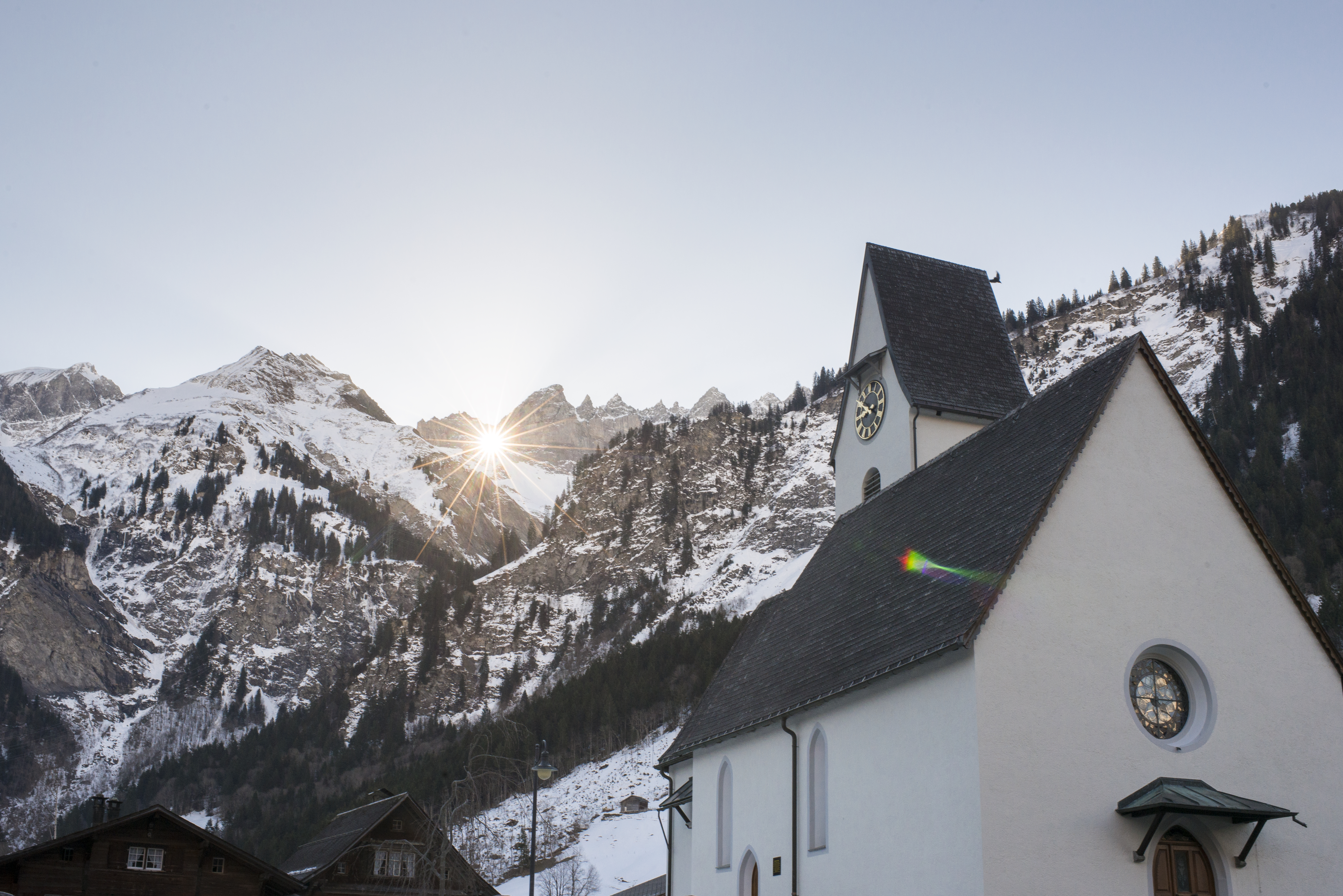
Sun shining through Martin's hole (Martinsloch), as seen from Elm

East of the main summit is the Martinsloch (lit. 'Martin's hole'), a triangular breakthrough, or hole 6 by 18 metres (20 by 59 ft) in diameter, through which the sun shines at particular times of the year.

The mountain is part of the Swiss Tectonic Arena Sardona and is a UNESCO World Heritage Site.

== See also ==
- List of mountains of Graubünden
- List of mountains of the canton of Glarus
