= Blistock =

Mountain in Switzerland

- Mittler Blistock
- Location within Switzerland Location within Canton of Glarus

Highest point
- Elevation: 2,448 m (8,031 ft)
- Prominence: 214 m (702 ft)
- Parent peak: Tödi
- Coordinates: 46°55′53″N 9°7′13″E

Geography
- Country: Switzerland
- Canton: Glarus
- Parent range: Glarus Alps

The Blistock (also spelled Blistögg) is a mountain of the Glarus Alps, overlooking Elm in the canton of Glarus. It lies on the range between the small valley of the Garichtisee and the Sernftal, north of the Kärpf.

It is composed of three summits: the Vorder Blistock (2,405 m [7,890 ft]), the Mittler Blistock (2,448 m [8,031 ft]) and the Hinter Blistock (2,446 m [8,025 ft]).

== See also ==
- List of mountains of the canton of Glarus
