= Fronalpstock (Glarus) =

Mountain of the Glarus Alps

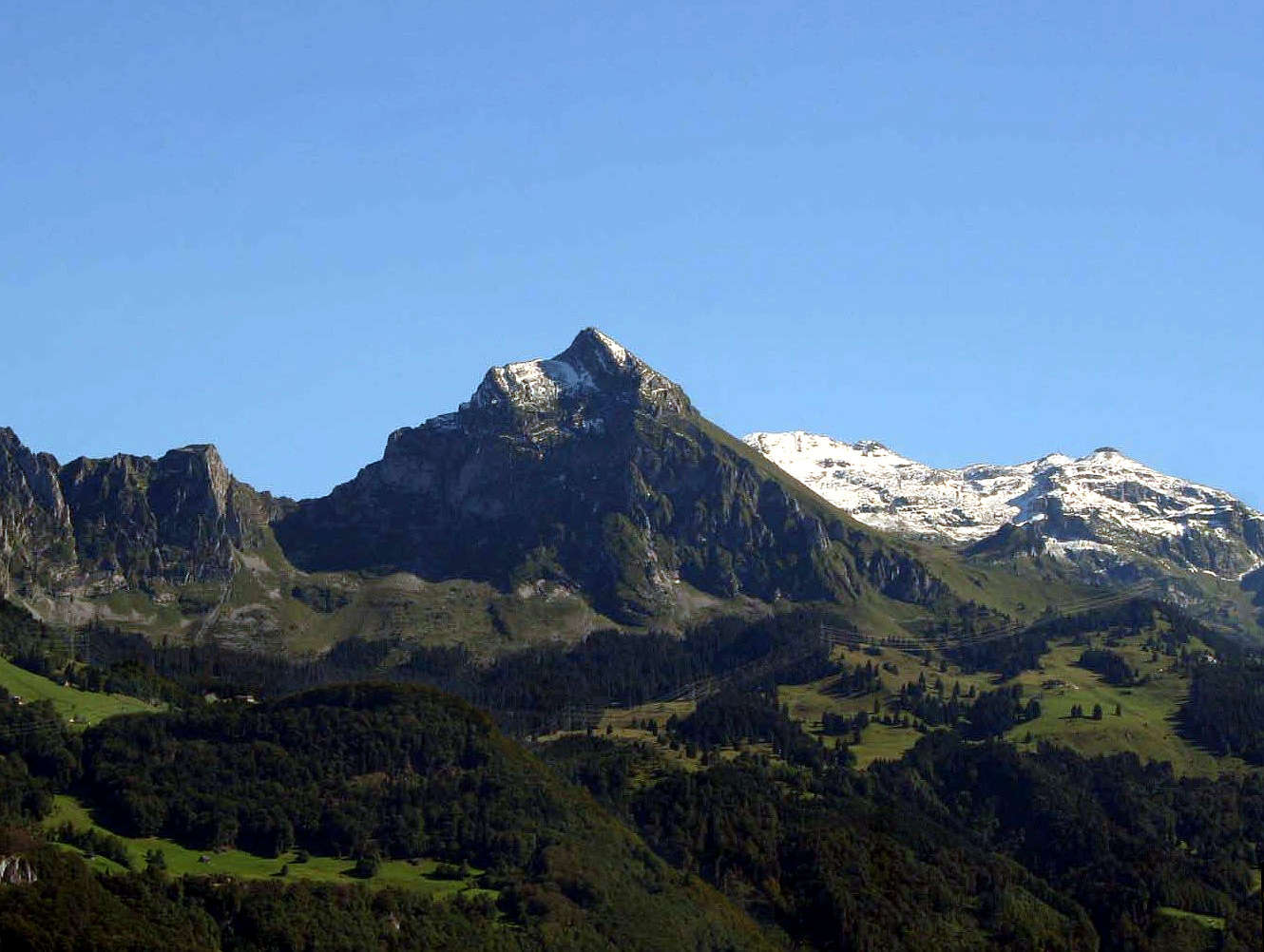

Highest point
- Elevation: 2,124 m (6,969 ft)
- Prominence: 272 m (892 ft)
- Coordinates: 47°04′07.3″N 9°06′31.9″E

Geography
- Location within Switzerland Location within Canton of Glarus
- Country: Switzerland
- Canton: Glarus
- Parent range: Glarus Alps
- Topo map: Swiss Federal Office of Topography swisstopo

The Fronalpstock is a mountain of the Glarus Alps, located east of the town of Glarus in the canton of Glarus.

== See also ==
- List of mountains of the canton of Glarus
