= Brünnelistock =

Mountain in Switzerland

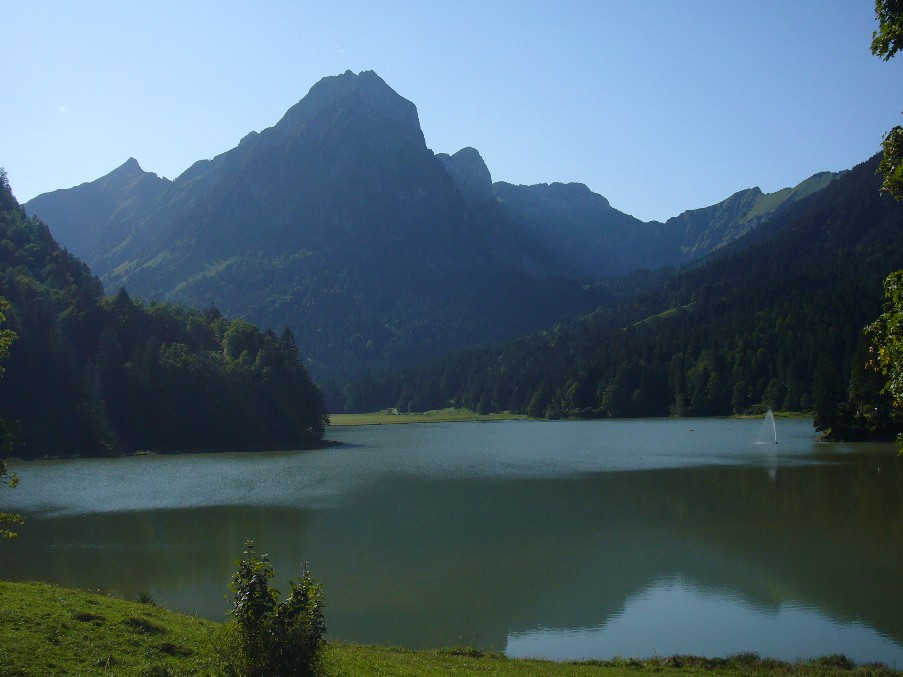
- View from the Obersee (east side)

Highest point
- Elevation: 2,133 m (6,998 ft)
- Prominence: 250 m (820 ft)
- Parent peak: Mutteristock
- Coordinates: 47°5′3″N 8°58′21″E

Geography
- Location within Switzerland Location within Canton of Glarus Location within Canton of Schwyz
- Country: Switzerland
- Cantons: Glarus / Schwyz
- Parent range: Schwyzer Alps

The Brünnelistock (2,133 m [6,998 ft]) is a mountain of the Schwyzer Alps, located on the border between the cantons of Schwyz and Glarus, Switzerland. It lies north of the Mutteristock, on the range between the Wägitalersee and the Obersee.

== See also ==
- List of mountains of the canton of Glarus
- List of mountains of the canton of Schwyz
