= Hausstock =

Mountain in Switzerland

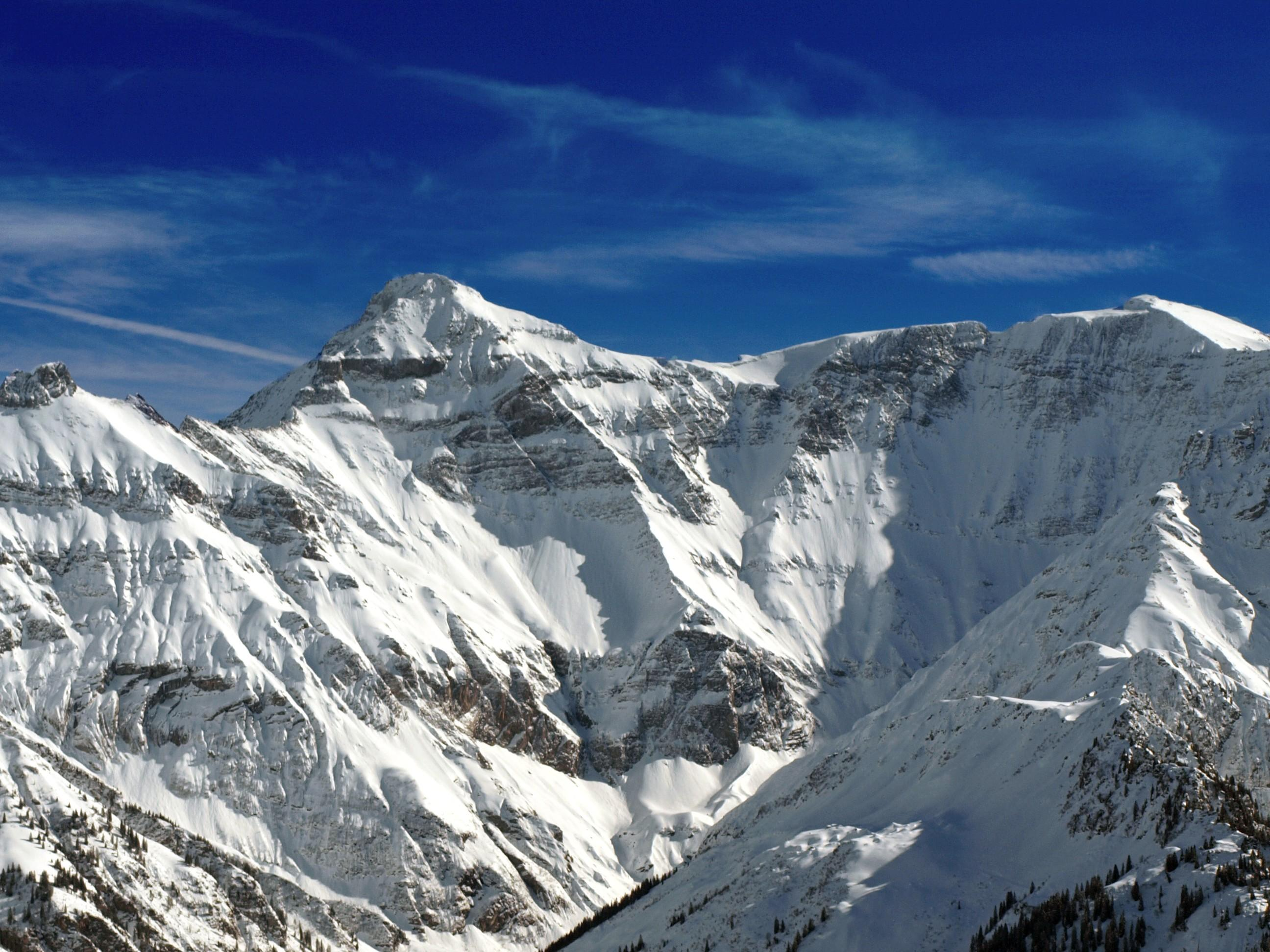
- The north-west face of the Hausstock

Highest point
- Elevation: 3,158 m (10,361 ft)
- Prominence: 655 m (2,149 ft)
- Parent peak: Tödi
- Isolation: 9.8 km (6.1 mi)
- Listing: Alpine mountains above 3000 m
- Coordinates: 46°52′32″N 9°4′0″E

Geography
- Location within Switzerland Location within Canton of Glarus Location within Canton of Grisons
- Country: Switzerland
- Cantons: Glarus / Grisons
- Parent range: Glarus Alps

Climbing
- First ascent: 1832
- Easiest route: South ridge

The Hausstock is a mountain in the Glarus Alps, at an elevation of 3,158 m (10,361 ft) on the border between the cantons of Glarus and Grisons (Graubünden), Switzerland. It overlooks the valleys of Linth and Sernf rivers in Glarus, and the valley of the Vorderrhein river in Grisons. The Hausstock was the site of the 1799 withdrawal of the Russian army under General Alexander Suvorov. A well-known destination already in the nineteenth century with British and American climbers, the mountain remains popular with mountain climbers and skiers.

== Geography and geology ==
The Hausstock overlooks the valleys of Linth and Sernf rivers in Glarus, and valley of the Vorderrhein river in Grisons. The nearest settlements are the villages of Linthal (in the Linth valley), Elm (in the Sernf valley) and Pigniu (on the slopes of the Vorderrhein valley). Administratively, the mountain lies in the municipalities of Glarus Süd, Ilanz/Glion and Andiast.

The Richetli Pass to the north of the mountain connects the villages of Elm and Linthal, reaching an elevation of 2,261 m (7,418 ft) and separating the Hausstock from the Kärpf mountain. The Panix Pass to the south-east connects the villages of Elm and Pigniu, reaching an elevation of 2,404 m (7,887 ft). Both passes carry only rough hiking trails, although the Richetli Pass forms part of the Alpine Pass Route, a long-distance hiking trail across Switzerland between Sargans and Montreux.

The Hausstock is connected to the summit of the Ruchi to the south-west by a 2 km (1.2 mi) long ridge.

Like the rest of the nummulite formation of the high Glarus Alps, the Hausstock contains fine-grained black sandstone. The mountain is part of the Glarus thrust, a major thrust fault; the top layer consists of Verrucano formations, 250–300 Ma old, on top of chalk, 100–150 Ma, and flysch, 35–50 Ma. In 2008, the thrust was declared a geotope, a geologic UNESCO World Heritage Site, under the name Swiss Tectonic Arena Sardona. The Glarus thrust can clearly be seen on the mountain at approximately 2,950 metres (9,678 ft).

== History ==
In October 1799, Russian General Alexander Suvorov made a strategic retreat from the French Revolutionary forces in Italy over the Panix Pass. The event is frequently mentioned in British mountain guides from the nineteenth century, adding interest to the mountain, and still attracts tourists to the area. A plaque in Paxis commemorates the event. Today, there is still a military presence: the Swiss army maintains a firing range for tanks; the army "even uses mine throwers to target the glacier on the upper flanks of the 3,000 m (9,800 ft)-metre high Hausstock Mountain."

According to the American mountaineer W. A. B. Coolidge, the first ascent of the mountain was made in 1832. The trek through the pass, under the shadow of the mountain, is described extensively in the works of the famous Irish naturalist and alpinist John Ball, who mentioned the Hausstock in many of his works. The Hausstock is one stage in what William Martin Conway, president of the Alpine Club from 1902 to 1904, called the "North Tour through the Alps," a route popular in the nineteenth century with British and American travelers; the mountain was often reached via a long ridge that connects it to neighboring Ruchi, at 3,107 metres (10,194 ft). The Hausstock is the highest of the mountains around the village of Elm, from which it is usually ascended; it continues to be a popular mountain to climb, and there is a mountain hut, the Panixerpasshütte, in the Panix pass.

Today, the Hausstock is a popular wintersports resort, accessible via the village of Elm with a ski lift system installed in the early 2000s. The "Hausstock" ski tour is said to be "incredible.... Long and varied with a rewarding view from the summit."

== See also ==
- List of mountains of Graubünden
- List of mountains of the canton of Glarus
