= Obersee (Glarus) =

Lake in the canton of Glarus, Switzerland

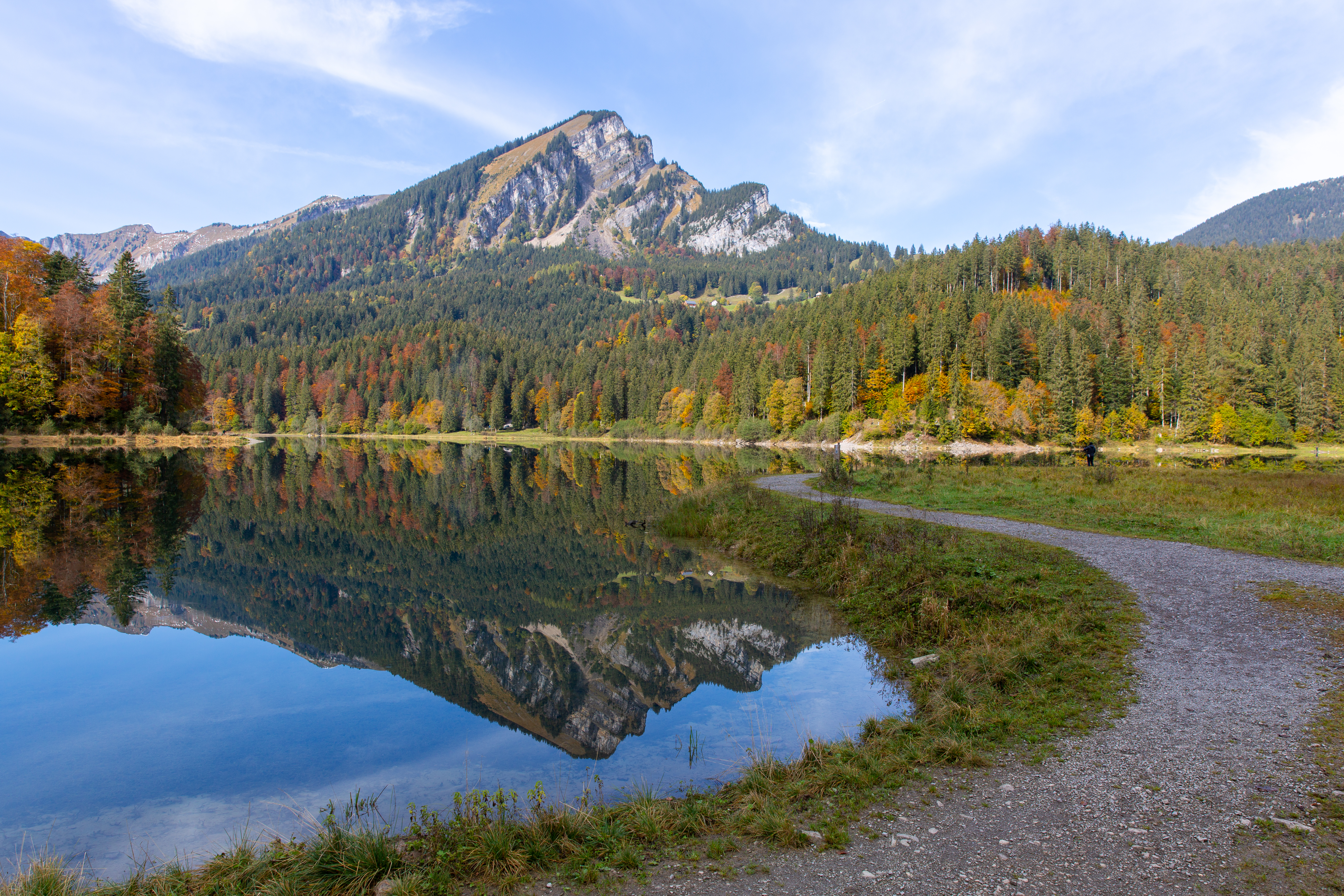
- Obersee and Bärensoolspitz

- Location within Canton of Glarus Location within Switzerland Location within Alps
- Interactive map of Obersee
- Location: Näfels, Glarus
- Coordinates: 47°5′13″N 9°00′50″E
- Type: natural, reservoir
- Basin countries: Switzerland
- Surface area: 24 ha (59 acres)
- Surface elevation: 982 m (3,222 ft)

Obersee (German pronunciation: [ˈoːbɐzeː], lit. 'Upper Lake') is a lake on Oberseealp in the Canton of Glarus, Switzerland. Its surface area is 24 ha (59 acres). There is a hotel on the lakeside which overlooks the lake and the Brünnelistock. During a cold and dry winter, there is a chance of black ice developing.

== See also ==
- List of mountain lakes of Switzerland
