= Piz Segnas =

Mountain in Switzerland

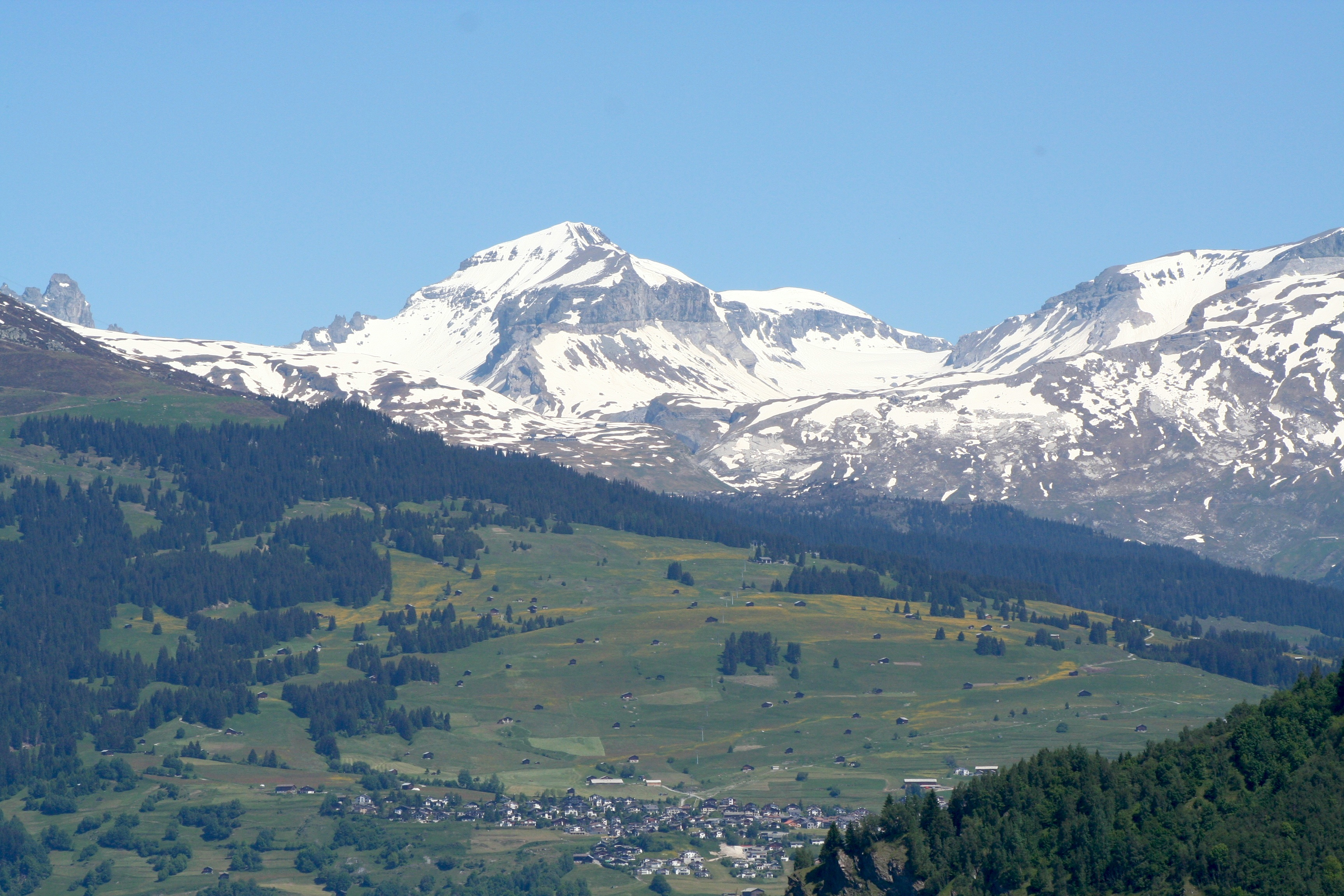
- Piz Segnas

Highest point
- Elevation: 3,099 m (10,167 ft)
- Prominence: 607 m (1,991 ft)
- Parent peak: Ringelspitz
- Listing: Alpine mountains above 3000 m
- Coordinates: 46°54′28.5″N 9°14′22.5″E

Geography
- Location within Switzerland Location within Canton of Glarus Location within Canton of Grisons
- Location: Glarus/Graubünden, Switzerland
- Country: Switzerland
- Cantons: Glarus /Grisons
- Parent range: Glarus Alps

Climbing
- Easiest route: To go up from the Pass dil Segnas along the ridge to the summit is the easiest route, only for experienced hikers though.

Piz Segnas is a mountain in the Glarus Alps, located on the border between the Swiss cantons of Glarus and Grisons (Graubünden).

The Piz Sardona is on the same ridge to the north, from where the Piz Dolf/Trinserhorn lies to the southeast. The Tschingelhörner with the famous Martinsloch (hole of St. Martin) lies to the west, with the Pass dil Segnas between the two mountains.

The mountain lies in the municipalities of Flims, in the canton of Grisons, and Glarus Süd, in the canton of Glarus. The nearest settlements are the villages of Flims, to the south, and Elm, to the west. A path crosses the Pass dil Segnas between the two villages. The easiest access to the area is an aerial cableway to Fil de Cassons (not active since 2015) from Flims or the hike to this ridge lying southeast of Piz Segnas.

== Accident ==
On 4 August 2018, a Junkers Ju 52 aircraft, operating a sightseeing flight, crashed into the western flank of the mountain, killing all 20 persons aboard.

== See also ==
- List of mountains of Graubünden
- List of mountains of the canton of Glarus
