= Ruchi (Glarus Alps) =

Mountain in Switzerland

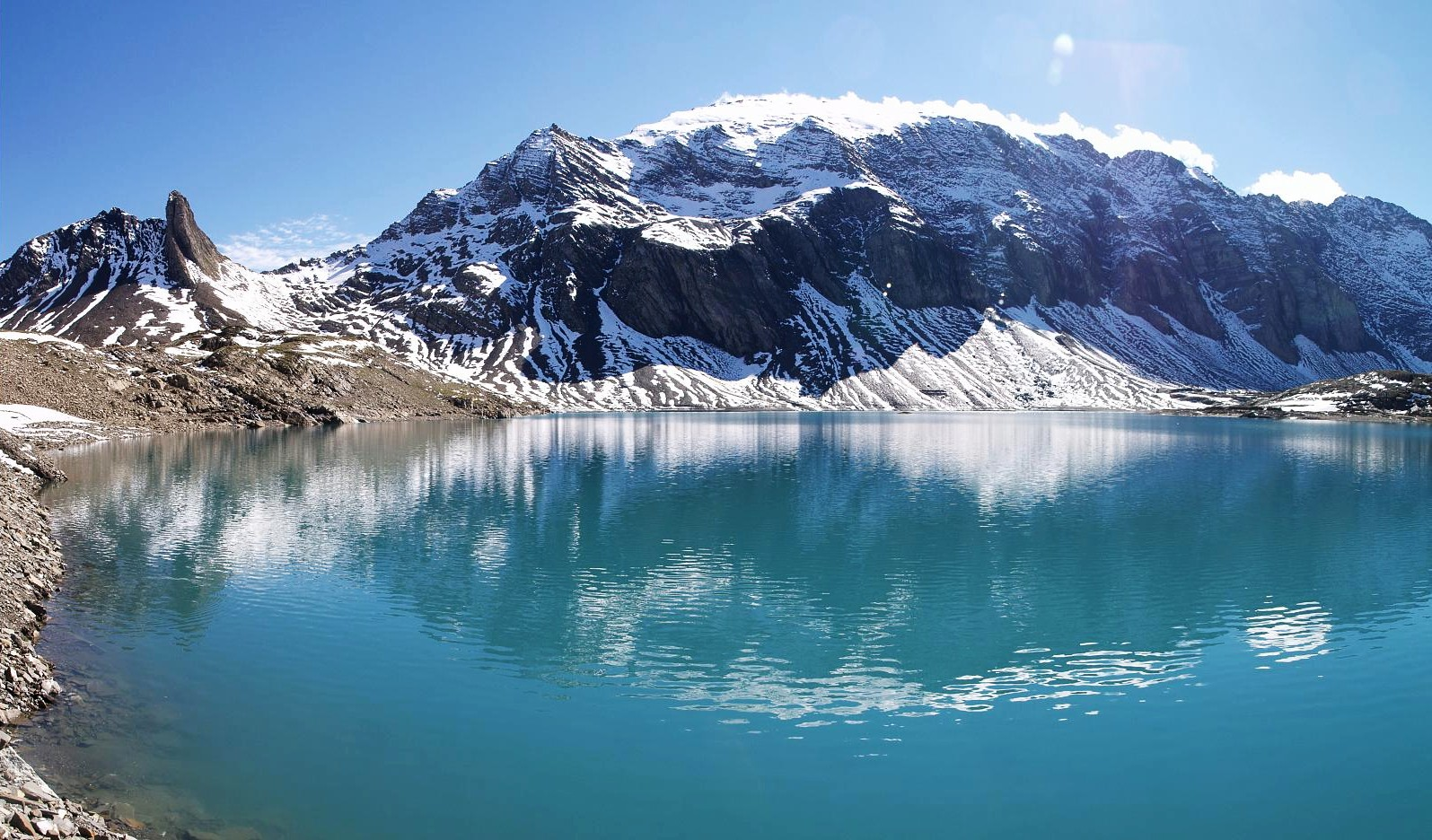
- The west side of the Ruchi from Muttsee

Highest point
- Elevation: 3,107 m (10,194 ft)
- Prominence: 170 m (560 ft)
- Parent peak: Hausstock
- Coordinates: 46°51′55″N 9°2′43″E

Geography
- Location within Switzerland Location within Canton of Glarus Location within Canton of Grisons
- Country: Switzerland
- Cantons: Glarus / Grisons
- Parent range: Glarus Alps

The Ruchi is a mountain in the Glarus Alps, located at an elevation of 3,107 m (10,194 ft) on the border between the Swiss cantons of Glarus and Grisons (Graubünden). It overlooks the Muttsee (2,446 m or 8,025 ft) on its west side from where a trail leads to the summit. On its south-east side lies a small glacier, the Glatscher da Gavirolas. The Ruchi is connected to the higher summit of the Hausstock on the north-east by a 2 km (1.2 mi) long ridge.

The nearest settlements are the villages of Linthal to the north, and Andiast to the south. Administratively, the mountain lies in the municipalities of Glarus Süd and Waltensburg/Vuorz.

== See also ==
- List of mountains of Graubünden
- List of mountains of the canton of Glarus
