= Hans Schardt =

Swiss geologist and professor

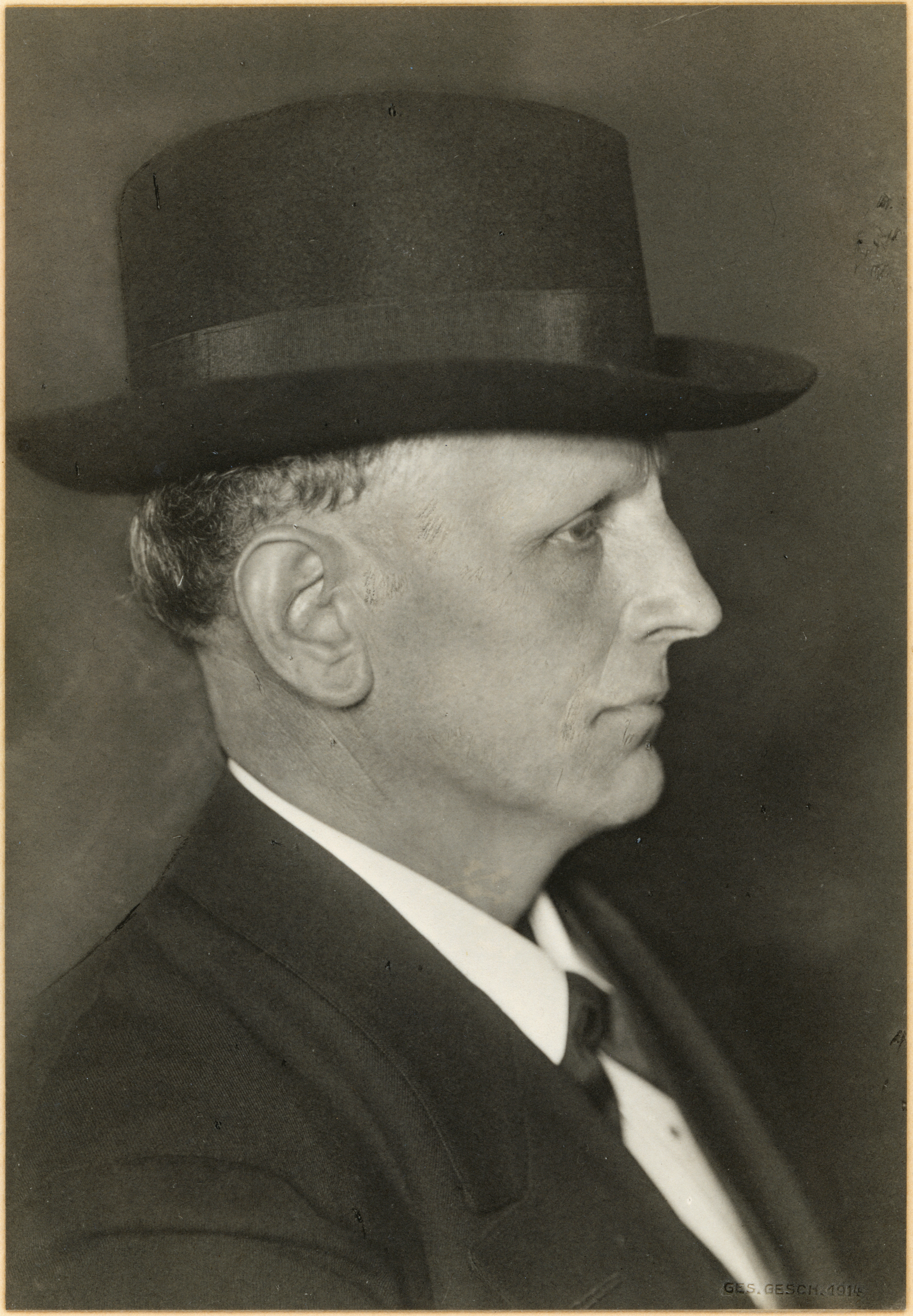
- Born: 18 June 1858; Basel, Switzerland
- Died: 3 February 1931 (aged 72)
- Known for: Studies on folding and movement of earth layers, explanation of the Glarus thrust as a nappe

Hans Schardt (18 June 1858 – 3 February 1931) was a Swiss geologist and a professor at the University of Neuchâtel and at the ETH and the University of Zurich. He contributed to studies on the folding and movement of layers of the earth based on stratigraphy. His studies where based on the Glarus thrust which he explained as a nappe.

== Life and work ==
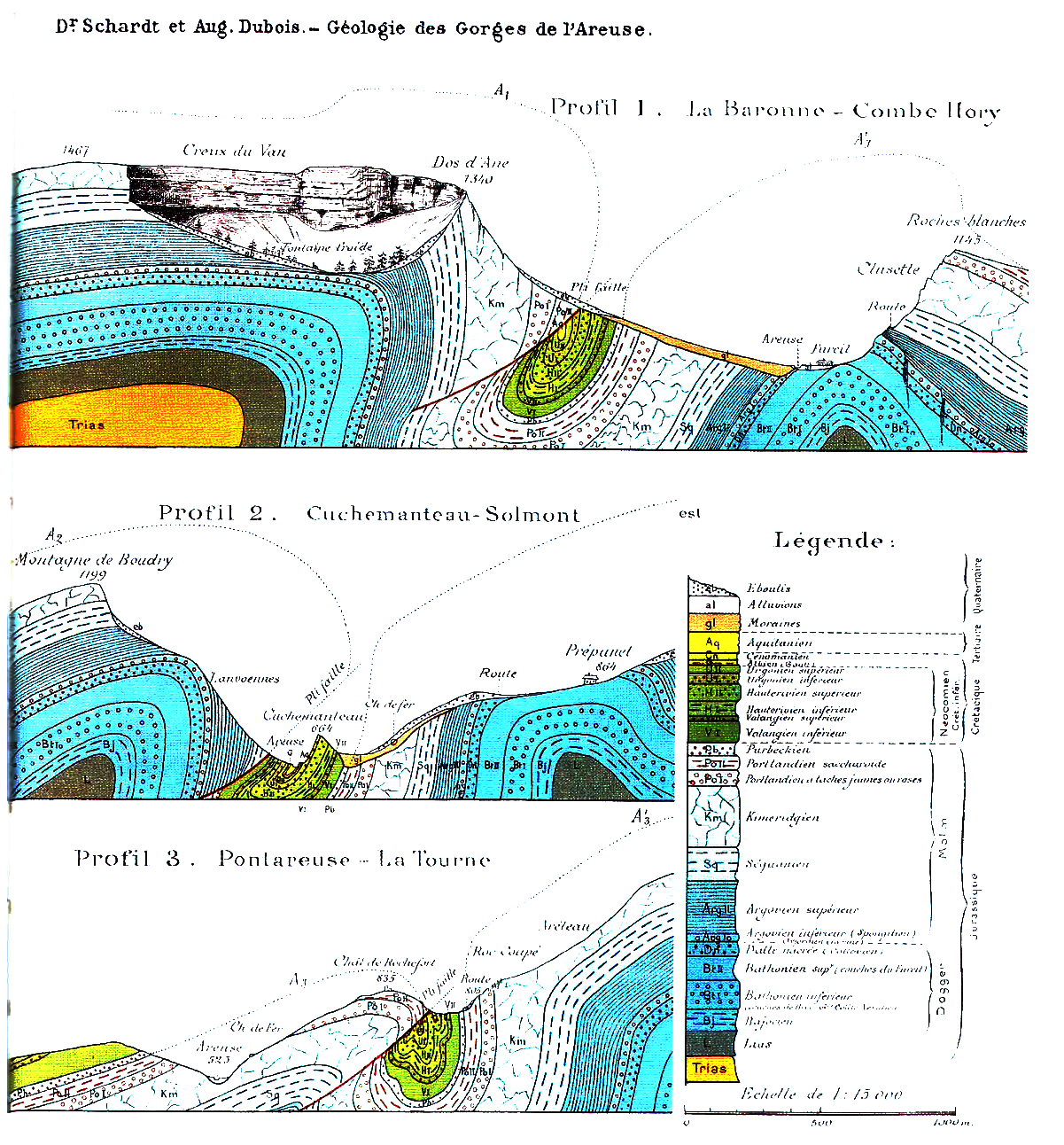
Profiles of the prealps by Schardt and Dubois (1902)

Schardt was born in Basel and moved to Yverdon to train as a pharmacist. He then trained to become a high-school teacher. He went to study geology at the University of Geneva and received a doctorate in 1884 after which he taught at the Collège in Montreux. Completing his habilitation in Lausanne in 1891, he went to Heidelberg and then became a professor at the Neuchâtel Academy where he began a geology institute. In 1911 he moved to the University of Zurich to succeed Albert Heim. He retired in 1928.

Schardt noted the prealps and some Jurassic strata were resting atop younger tertiary flysch. Schardt was the first to suggest that parts of the prealps were formed elsewhere and had been shifted (termed as allochthonous) and noted as tectonic outliers.

Schardt was a keen alpinist, and coauthor of a Geographical dictionary of Switzerland.
