= Gemsfairenstock =

Mountain in Switzerland

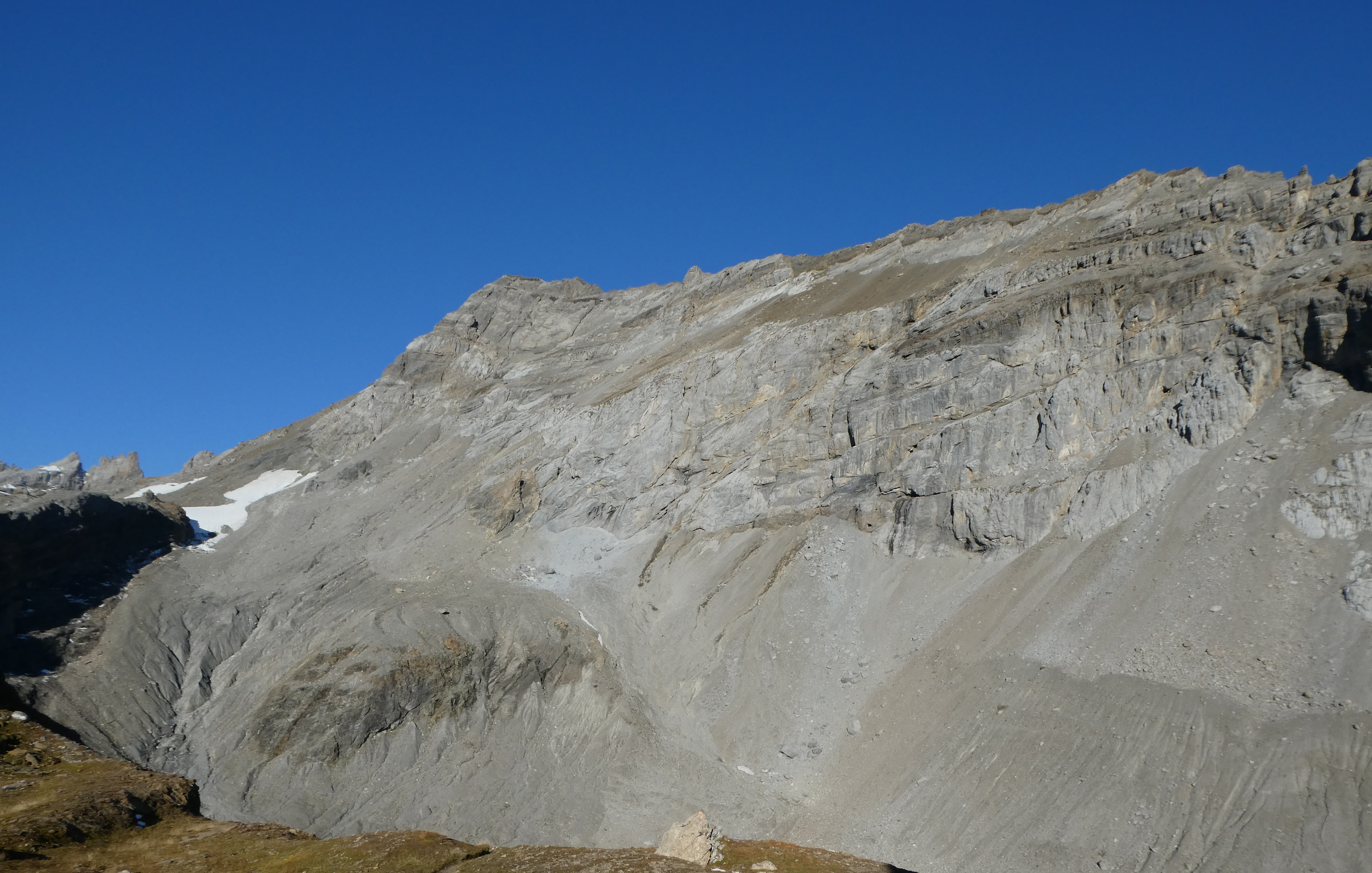

Highest point
- Elevation: 2,972 m (9,751 ft)
- Prominence: 124 m (407 ft)
- Parent peak: Schärhorn
- Coordinates: 46°51′38″N 08°55′4″E

Geography
- Location within Switzerland Location within Canton of Glarus Location within Canton of Uri
- Country: Switzerland
- Cantons: Glarus / Uri
- Parent range: Glarus Alps

The Gemsfairenstock is a mountain of the Glarus Alps, located on the border between the Swiss cantons of Uri and Glarus. It lies east of the Klausen Pass, on the range east of the Clariden.

A trail leads to its summit via the western ridge.

== See also ==
- List of mountains of Uri
- List of mountains of the canton of Glarus
