= Gufelstock =

Swiss mountain

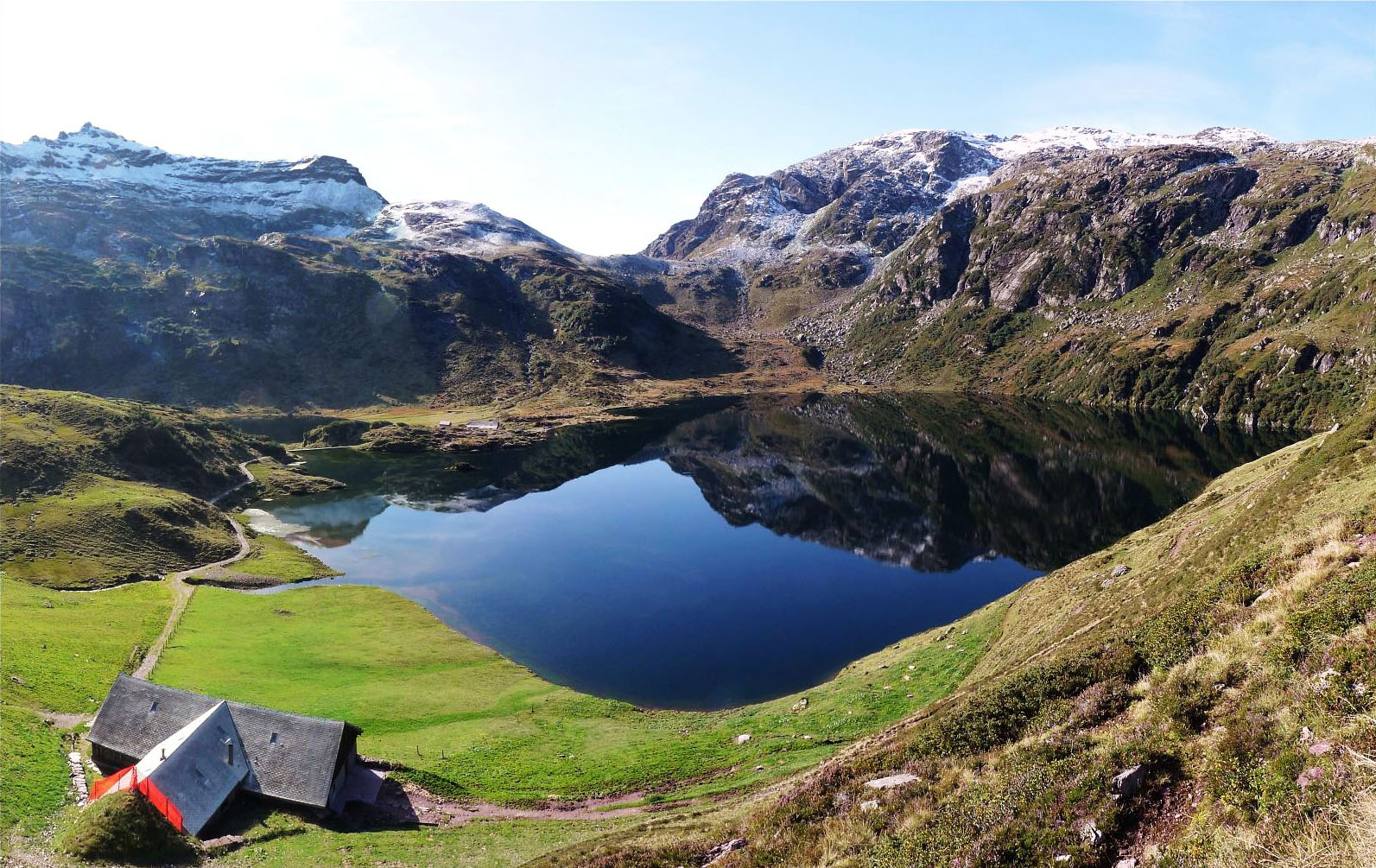
- The Gufelstock (centre right) from the Murgsee (north side)

Highest point
- Elevation: 2,436 m (7,992 ft)
- Prominence: 423 m (1,388 ft)
- Coordinates: 47°01′30″N 9°08′47.6″E

Geography
- Location within Switzerland Location within Canton of Glarus
- Country: Switzerland
- Canton: Glarus
- Parent range: Glarus Alps

The Gufelstock is a mountain of the Glarus Alps, overlooking Schwanden in the canton of Glarus, Switzerland. The border with the canton of St. Gallen runs across the northern base of the mountain.

== See also ==
- List of mountains of the canton of Glarus
