= Glarus thrust =

Glarus Overthrust
UNESCO World Heritage Site
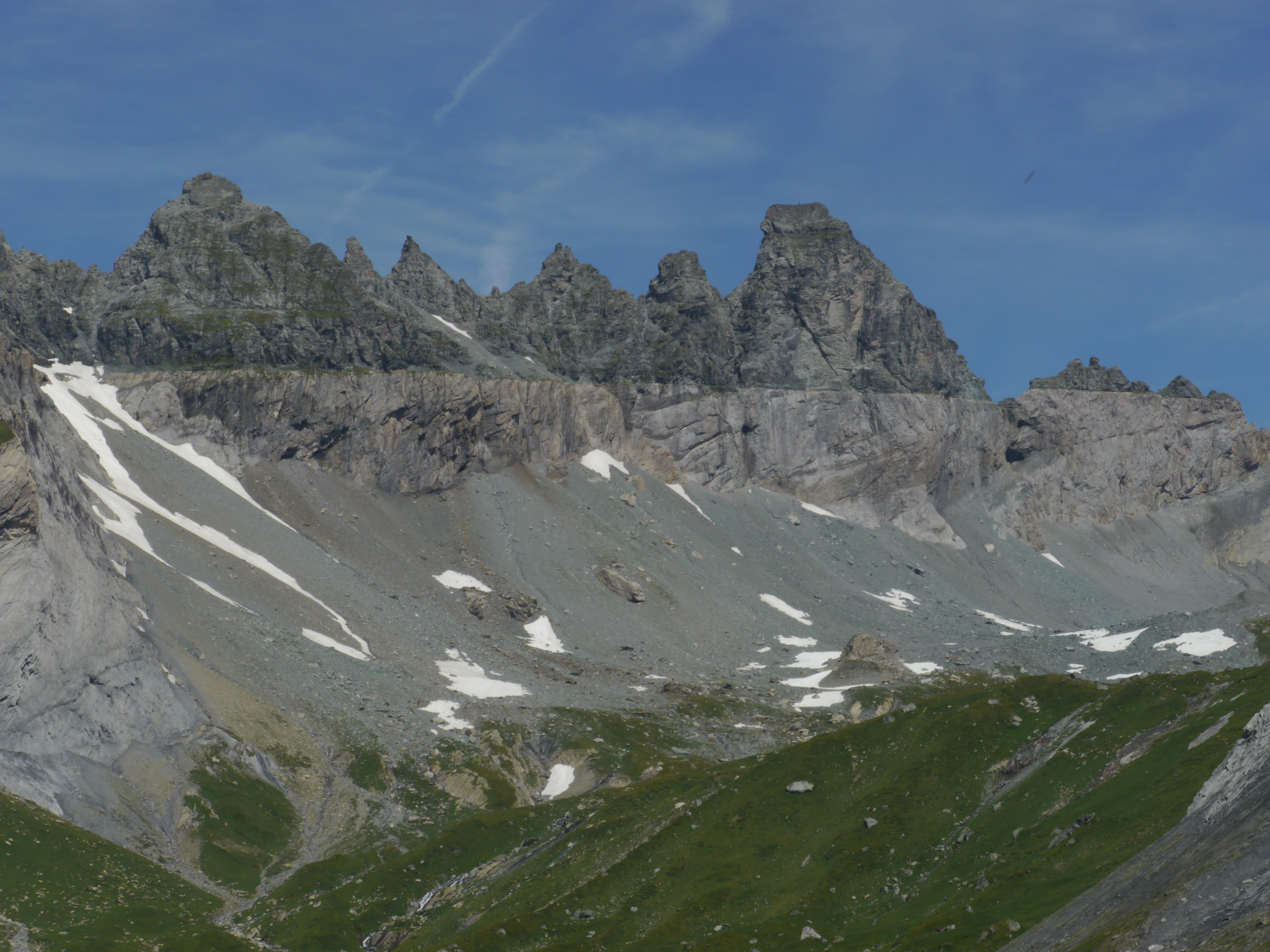
- The Tschingelhörner on the border of Swiss cantons Glarus and Graubünden. The Glarus thrust can be seen as a horizontal line in the cliffs.

- Location within Switzerland
- Location: Switzerland
- Part of: Swiss Tectonic Arena Sardona
- Criteria: Natural: (viii)
- Reference: 1179
- Inscription: 2008 (32nd Session)
- Website: www.glarusoverthrust.org
- Coordinates: 46°55′N 9°15′E

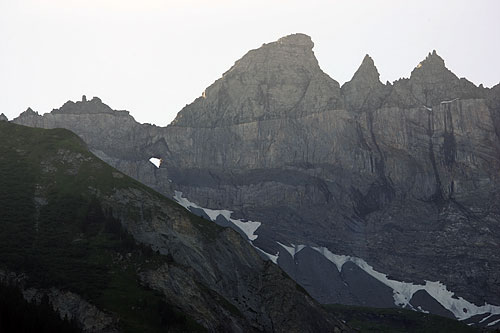
Martinsloch (lit. 'Martin's hole'), a triangular breakthrough, or hole 6 by 18 metres (20 by 59 ft) in diameter, located East of the main summit, through which the sun shines at particular times of the year.

The Glarus thrust (German: Glarner Überschiebung) is a major thrust fault in the Alps of eastern Switzerland. Along the thrust the Helvetic nappes were thrust more than 100 km to the north over the external Aarmassif and Infrahelvetic complex. The thrust forms the contact between older (Helvetic) Permo-Triassic rock layers of the Verrucano group and younger (external) Jurassic and Cretaceous limestones and Paleogene flysch and molasse.

The Glarus thrust crops out over a relatively large area in the cantons Glarus, St. Gallen and Graubünden, due to its horizontal orientation and the high local relief. Famous outcrops include those at Lochsite near Glarus (the town) and in a mountain cliff called Tschingelhörner between Elm and Flims (in the same cliff is a natural hole called the Martinsloch).

== World Heritage ==
Thrust faults of this kind are not uncommon in many mountain chains around the world, but the Glarus thrust is a well accessible example and has, as such, played an important role in the development of geological knowledge on mountain building. For this reason, the area in which the thrust is found was declared a geotope, a geologic UNESCO World Heritage Site, under the name "Swiss Tectonic Arena Sardona." The area of this "tectonic arena" encompasses 32,850 hectares of mainly mountainous landscape in 19 communities between the Surselva, Linthtal and Walensee. In the arena are a number of peaks higher than 3000 meters, such as Surenstock (its Romansh name is Piz Sardona, from which the name comes), Ringelspitz and Pizol.

In 2006, the Swiss government made a first proposal to declare the region World Heritage to the International Union for Conservation of Nature (IUCN). The IUCN then found that the area lacked extraordinary or universal value and denied the proposal. The Swiss made a new proposal in March 2008, which was successful this time. The region was declared a World Heritage Site in July 2008, because "the area displays an exceptional example of mountain building through continental collision and features excellent geological sections through tectonic thrust."

The American Museum of Natural History in New York exposes a full-scale reconstruction of the Glarus thrust.

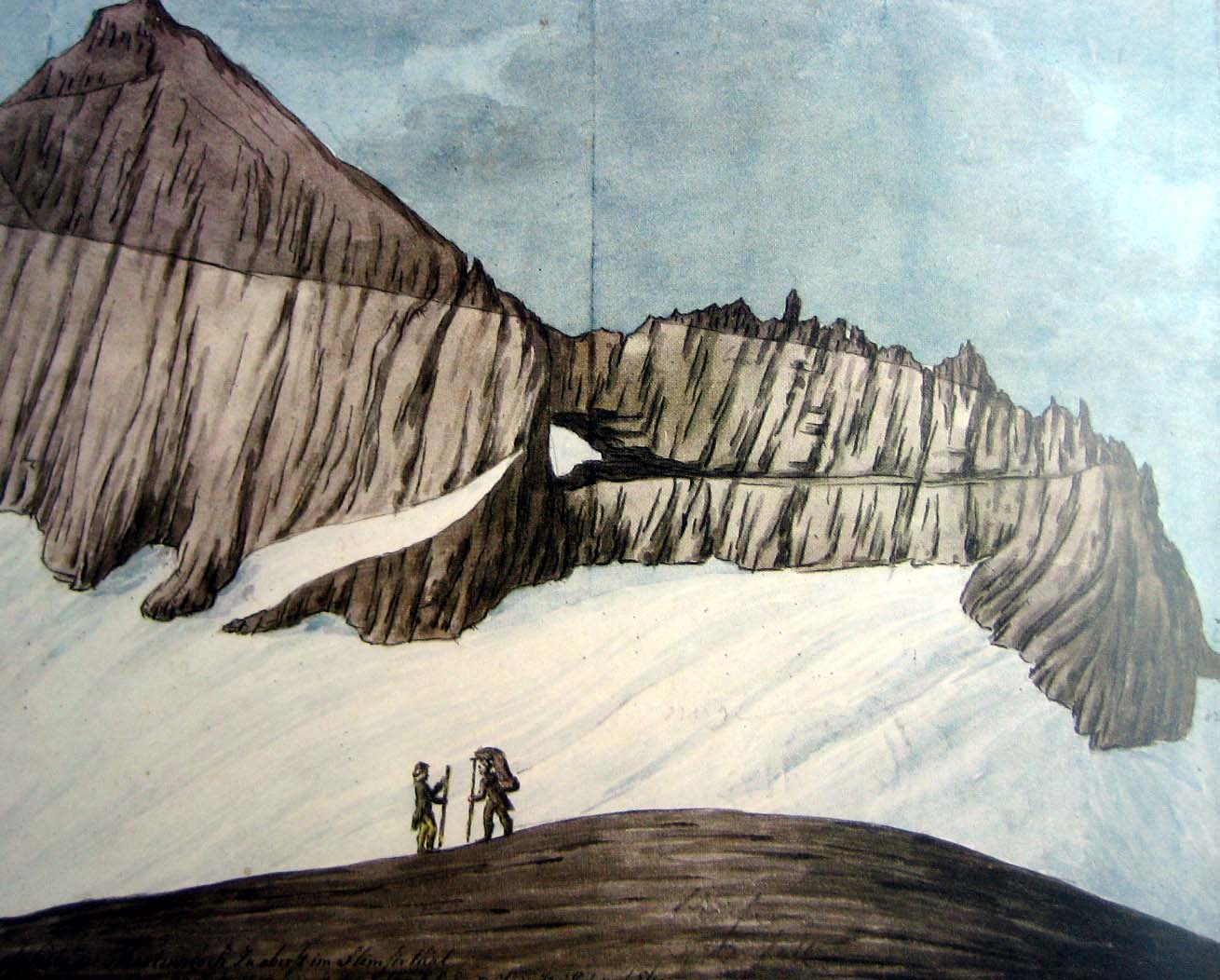
Drawing of the Glarus thrust in the Tschingelhörner by Hans Conrad Escher von der Linth, 1812.

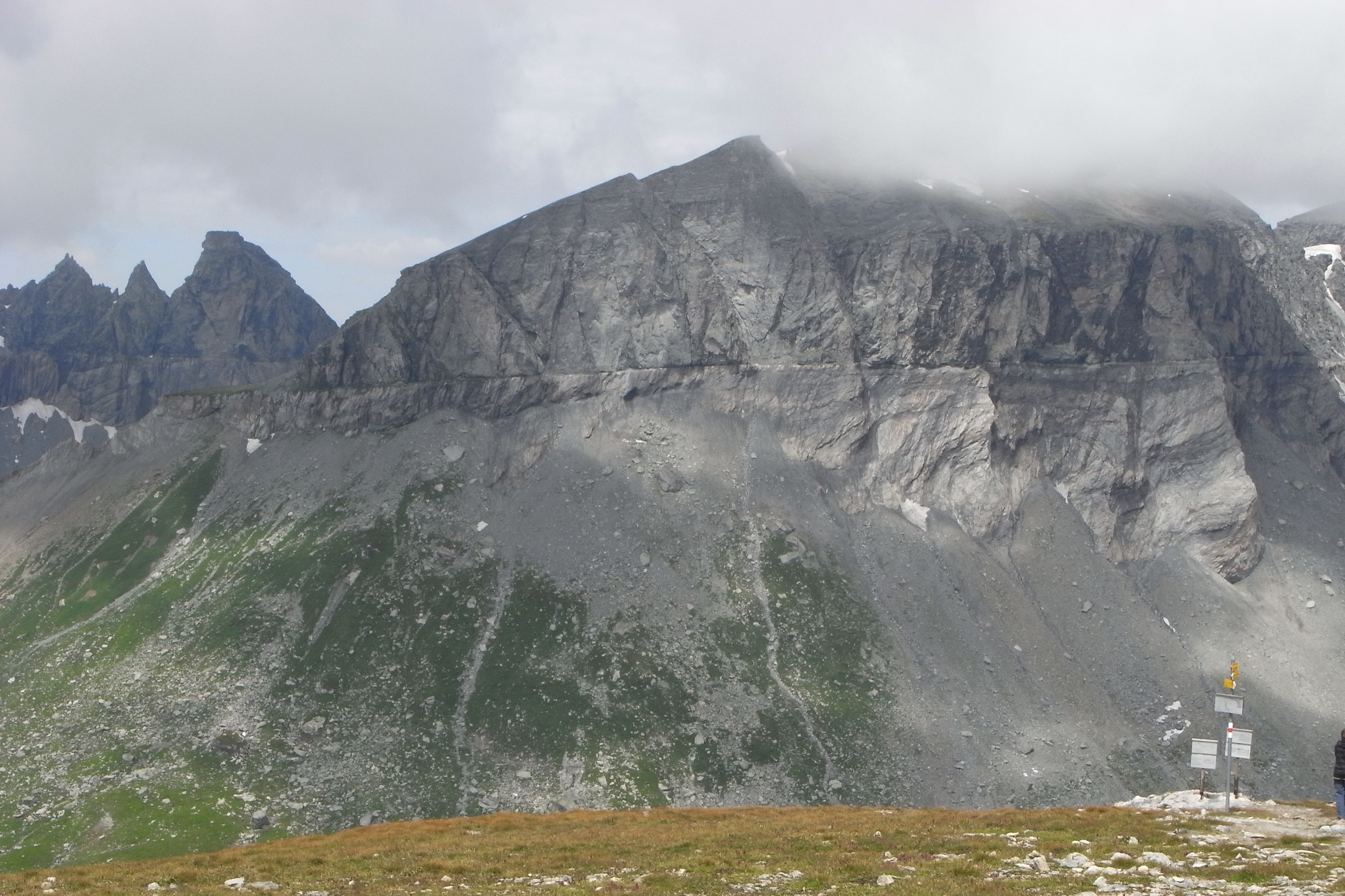
Glarus thrust fault at Piz Segnes

== History ==
The first naturalist to examine the Glarus thrust was Hans Conrad Escher von der Linth (1767–1823). Escher von der Linth discovered that, contradictory to Steno's law of superposition, older rocks are on top of younger ones in certain outcrops in Glarus. His son Arnold Escher von der Linth (1807–1872), the first professor in geology at the ETH at Zürich, mapped the structure in more detail and concluded that it could be a huge thrust. At the time, most geologists still accepted the theory of geosynclines, which states that mountains are formed by vertical movements within the Earth's crust. Escher von der Linth had therefore difficulty with explaining the size of the thrust fault. In 1848, he invited the British geologist Roderick Murchison, an international authority, to come and look at the structure. Murchison was familiar with larger thrust faults in Scotland and agreed with Escher's interpretation. However, Escher himself felt insecure about his idea and when he published his observations in 1866 he instead interpreted the Glarus thrust as two large overturned narrow anticlines. This hypothesis was rather absurd, as he admitted himself in private.

Escher's successor as professor at Zürich, Albert Heim (1849–1937), initially stuck to his predecessor's interpretation of two anticlines. However, some geologists favoured the idea of a thrust. One of them was Marcel Alexandre Bertrand (1847–1907), who interpreted the structure as a thrust in 1884, after reading Heims observations. Bertrand was familiar with the Faille du Midi (Variscan orogeny), a large thrust fault in the Belgian Ardennes. Meanwhile, British geologists began to recognize the nature of thrust faults in the Scottish Highlands. In 1883, Archibald Geikie accepted that the Highlands are a thrust system. Swiss geologists Hans Schardt and Maurice Lugeon then discovered in 1893 that in western Switzerland, Jurassic rock layers are on top of younger molasse too, and argued that the structure of the Alps is a large stack of nappes, large sheets of rock that had been thrust on top of each other. At the turn of the century, Heim was also convinced of the new theory. He and other Swiss geologists now started mapping the nappes of Switzerland in more detail. From that moment on, geologists began recognizing large thrusts in many mountain chains around the world.

However, it was still not understood where the huge forces that moved the nappes came from. Only with the arrival of plate tectonic theory in the 1950s an explanation was found. In plate tectonics, the horizontal movement of tectonic plates over the Earth's soft asthenosphere causes horizontal forces within the crust. Presently, geologists explain the formation of most mountain chains by the convergent boundary evolving between tectonic plates accompanied by a subduction process in which the heavier plate dives beneath the less dense plate and sinks into the Earth's mantle.

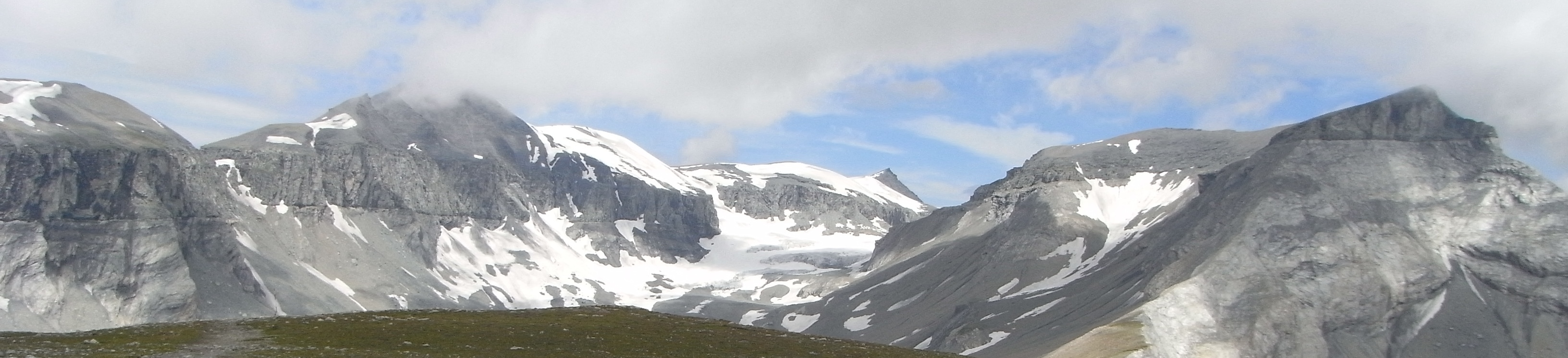
Glarus Thrust fault at Piz Segnes

== See also ==
- Nappe
- Thrust fault
- Geology of the Alps
- Geology of Scotland (Scottish thrust faults)
- Orogeny

== Literature ==
- "Glarus, Alpine Nappes". The Geological Society.
- Franks, Sibylle; Rudolf Trümpy (September 2005). "The Sixth International Geological Congress: Zürich, 1894" (PDF). Journal of International Geoscience. Episodes. 28 (3). International Union of Geological sciences: 187–192. Archived from the original (PDF) on 2011-09-28.
- Poulet, Thomas; Veveakis, Manolis; Herwegh, Marco; Buckingham, Thomas; Regenauer‐Lieb, Klaus (2014-10-28). "Modeling episodic fluid‐release events in the ductile carbonates of the Glarus thrust" (PDF). Geophysical Research Letters. 41 (20): 7121–7128. doi:10.1002/2014GL061715. hdl:1959.4/unsworks_37154. ISSN 0094-8276.
- Badertscher, Nicolas P.; Beaudoin, Georges; Therrien, René; Burkhard, Martin (2002). "Glarus overthrust: A major pathway for the escape of fluids out of the Alpine orogen". Geology. 30 (10): 875–878. doi:10.1130/0091-7613(2002)030<0875:GOAMPF>2.0.CO;2. ISSN 0091-7613.
- Herwegh, Marco; Hürzeler, Jean-Pierre; Pfiffner, O. Adrian; Schmid, Stefan M.; Abart, Rainer; Ebert, Andreas (2008). "The Glarus thrust: Excursion guide and report of a field trip of the Swiss Tectonic Studies Group (Swiss Geological Society, 14–16. 09. 2006)". Swiss Journal of Geosciences. 101 (2): 323–340. doi:10.1007/s00015-008-1259-z. ISSN 1661-8726.
