= Belchenflue Pass =

Mountain pass used exclusively by hikers

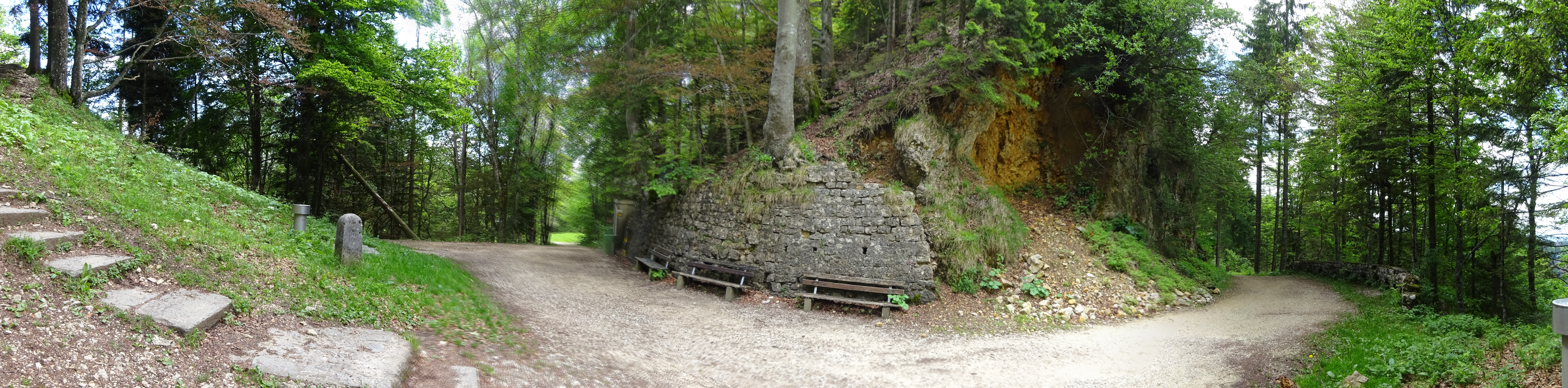
- Old military road between Chilchzimmersattel and Belchenflue Pass

- Location within Alps
- Elevation: 1,055 metres (3,461 ft)
- Traversed by: Road

Third Approach
- Location: Switzerland
- Range: Jura Mountains
- Coordinates: 47°21′45″N 7°48′33″E

Belchenflue Pass (el. 1055 m.) is a mountain pass to use only by hikers in the Jura Mountains between the cantons of Basel-Country and Solothurn. Nearestby access by car is on the Chilchzimmersattel. Actually the pass does not have a distinct name. It is the signpost just nearby the dead-end hiking trail that has Belchenflue written on.

The mountain is also called Bölchen by locals. The name came originally from Celtic from the sun god Belenus. The namegiving nearby peak (el. 1099 m.) was an important marker for the tribal calendar establishing the seasons. Along with the peak of the same name in Alsace (Alsatian Belchen) and Black Forest (Black Forest Belchen), it allowed the establishment of the winter and summer solstice.

As is the case with much of the Jura range, the cliffs are formed of hard oolithic limestone, which has been exposed as the softer stone above it has eroded.

The pass forms the divide between the watershed of the Aare in the south and the Ergolz in the north. Both flow into the Rhine. To the east are the Challhöchi and Unterer Hauenstein passes.

== See also ==
- List of highest paved roads in Europe
- List of mountain passes
- List of the highest Swiss passes
