= Ruchen =

Ruchen may refer to several mountains:

- Ruchen (Jura Mountains), Jura Mountains, Switzerland
- Gross Ruchen, Glarus Alps, Switzerland
- Chli Ruchen, Glarus Alps, Switzerland
- Ruchen is the highest peak of Mürtschenstock, Glarus Alps, Switzerland
- alternativ name for Foostock, Glarus Alps, Switzerland
- Ruchen, one of the summit of the Glärnisch massif, Schwyzer Alps, Switzerland
