= Belchen =

Mountain in the Black Forest, Germany

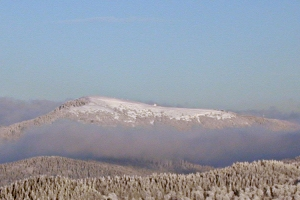
- The summit of Belchen seen from Blauen

Highest point
- Elevation: 1,414 m (4,639 ft)
- Prominence: 379 m (1,243 ft) (Wiedener Eck)
- Parent peak: Feldberg
- Isolation: 13.5 km (8.4 mi)
- Coordinates: 47°49′21″N 7°50′01″E

Geography
- Location within Baden-Württemberg
- Location: Germany
- Parent range: Black Forest

Belchen, 1,414 metres (4,639 ft), or Black Forest Belchen (German: Schwarzwälder Belchen) is the fourth-highest summit of the Black Forest, after Feldberg, Seebuck, and Herzogenhorn. (Note: If the Baldenweger Buck is counted, Belchen is only the fifth highest point in the Black Forest. If, however, only points with 100 metres prominence are counted as independent mountains, Belchen is the third highest after Feldberg and Herzogenhorn.) The municipalities of Münstertal, Schönenberg and Kleines Wiesental meet on the summit dome of Belchen which is located in the southwest German state of Baden-Württemberg.

== Geography ==
The Belchen, with its furrowed, unbroken rock faces, rises 1,000 metres out of the Münstertal valley. Its north face is thus the area of highest relief energy in the German Central Uplands. Even towards the south the mountain drops steeply, its schrofen slopes descending 800 metres into the valley bowl of the Little Wiese near Neuenweg.

The large expanse of rolling plateau in the eastern Black Forest has only survived in small places at the Belchen. Towards the Rhine Plain and the Blauen mountain the western main crest of the southern Black Forest has been cut into narrow ridges as a result of the marked uplift of the range during the Pleistocene and the erosive work of its streams. The ice age glaciation of the Belchen region did not leave traces as clear as those on Feldberg. To the north and south, small avalanche bowl glaciers formed, whose maximum extent reached the edge of the Black Forest.

The domed kuppe consists of granite, whereas the surrounding mountainsides are mostly formed of gneisses. The area around Belchen was a mining region, at times an important one, between 900 and 1975.

A chain of well-preserved boundary stones from 1790 runs over the summit of the Belchen. These mark the old border between the Habsburg territory of Further Austria to the north and the Margraviate of Baden to the south of the mountain.

== Belchen triangle ==
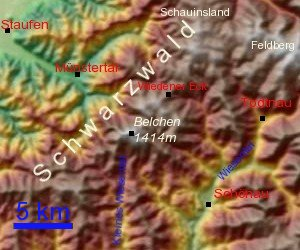
Topographic map of the Belchen region (heights from 250–1,450 m)

The domed, treeless summit has a striking profile that, seen from the Upper Rhine Plain, is almost symmetrical. Belchen (Celtic: the radiant) is a name also used for other high points in the neighbouring mountains, including two that are especially striking when covered with snow. Together with the Black Forest Belchen, they form the so-called Belchen triangle: to the west on the French side of the Upper Rhine Plain is the Alsatian Belchen (Elsässer Belchen) or Ballon d'Alsace in the Vosges; to the south on the southern side of the Upper Rhine is the "Swiss Belchen", known as Belchenflue. Also visible from Alsace are Great Belchen (Großer) and Little Belchen (Kleiner Belchen), or Grand and Petit Ballon which, together with the others belong to the so-called Belchen system.

The panorama from the top covers large parts of the Black Forest to the Hornisgrinde, the Vosges, the Jura and, in good weather, the Alps from the Zugspitze to Mont Blanc. Belchen also has far-reaching views across the Upper Rhine Plain to Alsace.

== Belchen nature reserve ==
Because of its rare flora and fauna, Belchen was declared a nature reserve in 1949. The area was extended to 1600 hectares in 1993, and is now part of the Southern Black Forest Nature Park.

Many species of rare butterflies, beetles, and birds are found in the highland areas of Belchen. Typical birds include the raven, song thrush, citril finch and water pipit, as well as peregrine falcons, capercaillie, and hazel grouse.

Among the plants are relicts from the last ice age that are otherwise only found in the Alps. These include the Swiss bellflower, Alpine rose, Swiss hawkbit and lichens.

== Tourism ==
Belchen is a popular destination in the southern Black Forest, with over 300,000 visitors annually. In 1866 the first guest house was built below the summit. In 1899 its replacement was finished. This has been expanded and remodelled several times. In 1904 the road to Belchen was opened. In 1949 the proposal to build a chair lift from Obermünstertal to the summit failed. Ski slopes are limited although there are now eleven ski lifts in the Belchen region. The Belchen road was the public road with the highest destination in the German Central Uplands. The uppermost section has been placed out of bounds since the opening of the cable car in December 2001.

Belchen lies on the West Way, a 285-km footpath maintained by the Black Forest Club that runs from Pforzheim to Basel. Other marked footpaths run from Untermünstertal, Schönau and Neuenweg up the mountain.

In 2008, in order to protect the conservation area for visitor management and as a development concept, the so-called Belchen concept was developed and submitted as a model. It formulated aims, recommendations and spheres of action, not just for institutions and authorities, but also for the local population and guests. Participants included the Forestry Test and Research Centre for Baden-Württemberg in Freiburg, the German Sport University, Cologne, the Southern Black Forest Nature Park, the municipality of Münstertal, the Münstertal-Staufen Holiday Region and private citizens of Münstertal.

The Belchen summit circular trail is one of nine themed trails. The circular path is 1.3 km long and starts at the Belchenhaus.

== Cable car ==
A gondola lift operates on Belchen with 8-person cabins that run from the bottom station in Aitern-Multen (GVV Schönau) to the top station at 1,356 metres above sea level. It is 1,150 metres long and ascends 262 metres. The Belchenbahn has disabled boarding and alighting facilities at the top and bottom stations.

== Literature ==
- Wolf Drescher: Der Wald im Belchengebiet. In: Der Belchen. Natur- und Landschaftsschutzgebiete Baden-Württembergs 13, pp. 481–536 ISBN 3-88251-136-2
- Geographisch-kartographisches Institut Meyer: Südschwarzwald (Meyers Naturführer). Meyers Lexikonverlag, Mannheim, 1989 ISBN 3-411-02775-4
- Dieter Kohlhepp: Der Belchen. Waldkircher Verlags-Gesellschaft, 1997, ISBN 3-87885-323-8
- Albrecht Schlageter: Zur Geschichte des Bergbaus im Umkreis des Belchen. In: Der Belchen. Natur- und Landschaftsschutzgebiete Baden-Württembergs 13, pp. 127–310 ISBN 3-88251-136-2
- Bezirksstelle für Naturschutz und Landschaftspflege Freiburg, ed. (1994), Natur und Naturschutz – Der Belchen im Schwarzwald (in German), Waldkirch, ISBN 3-87885-292-4

== Photo gallery ==
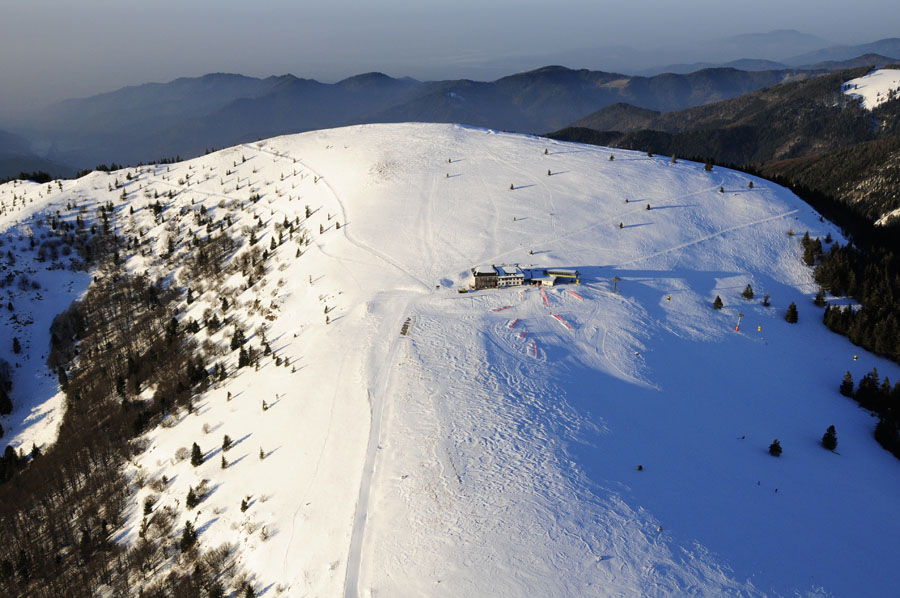
Aerial photograph of Belchen's summit

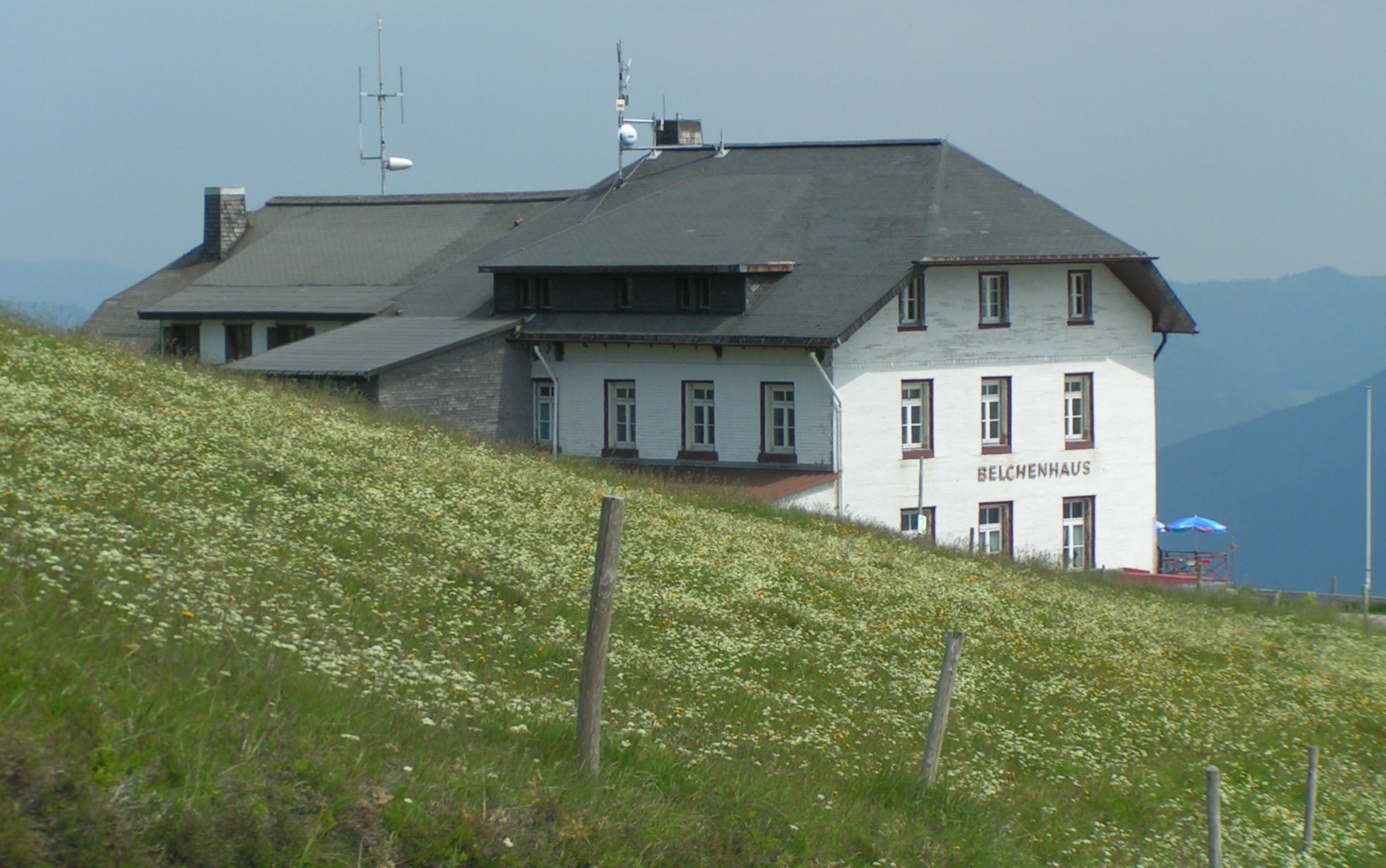
The Belchenhaus

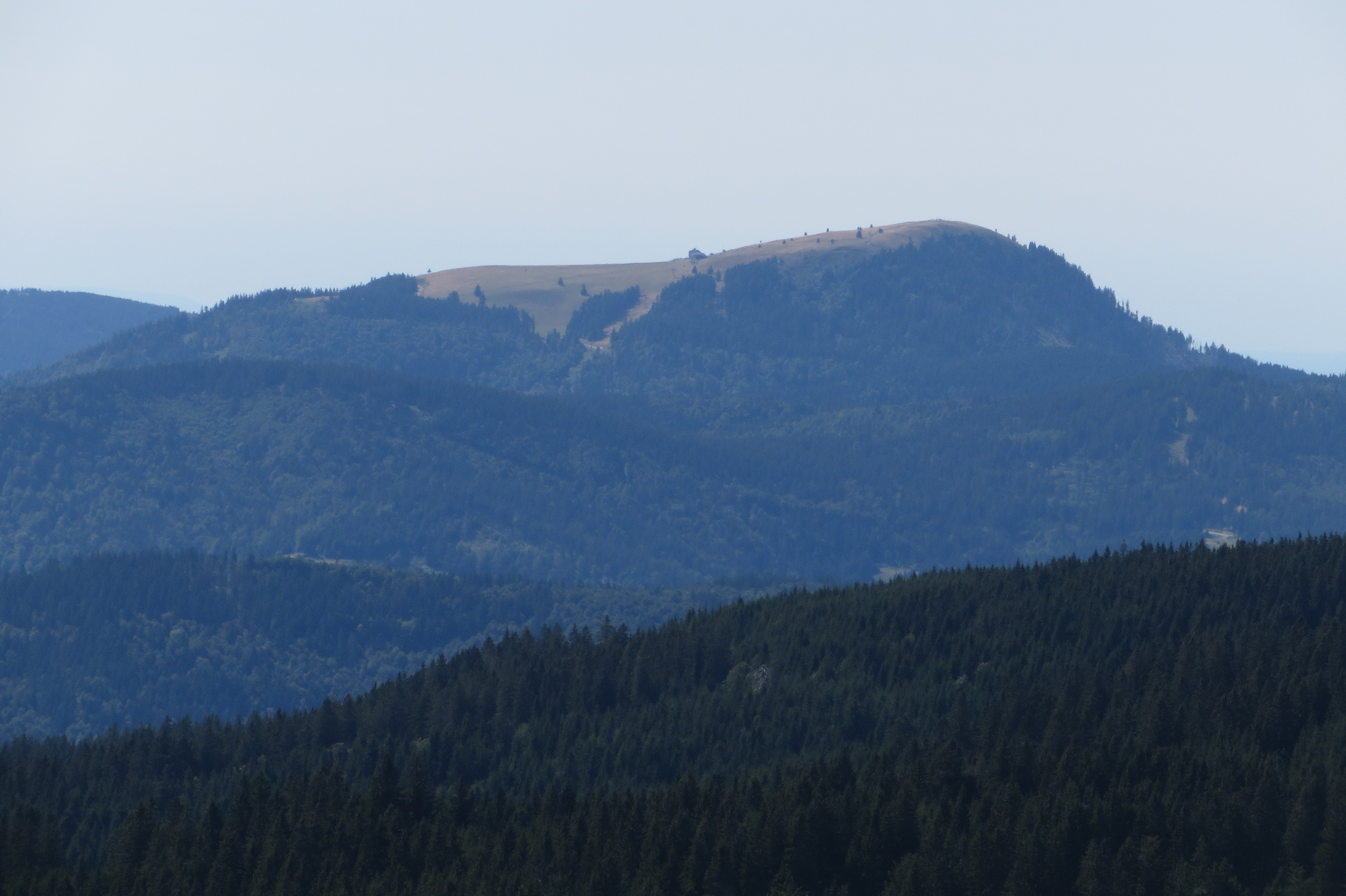
Belchen seen from Feldberg

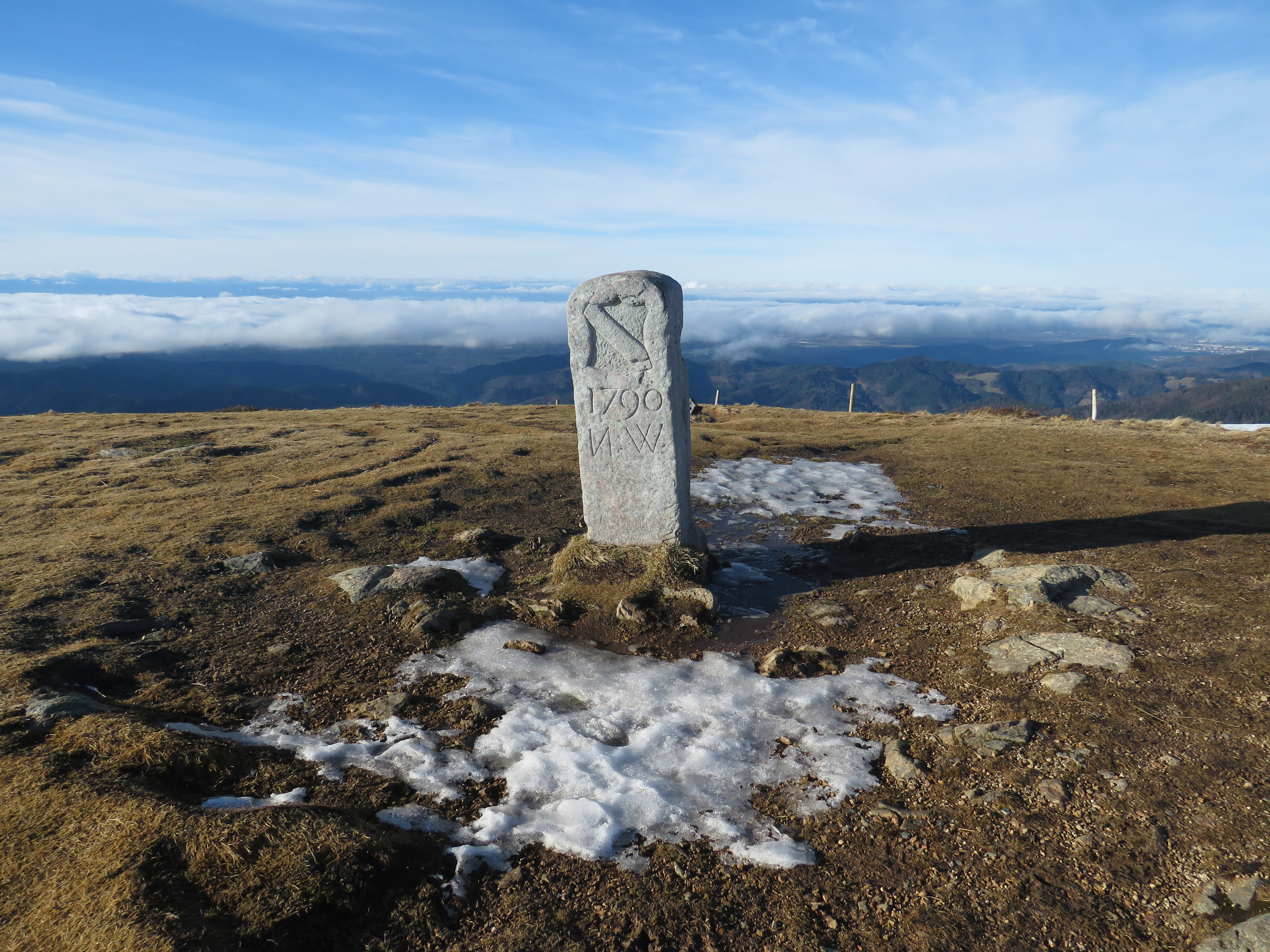
Boundary stone at Belchen's summit

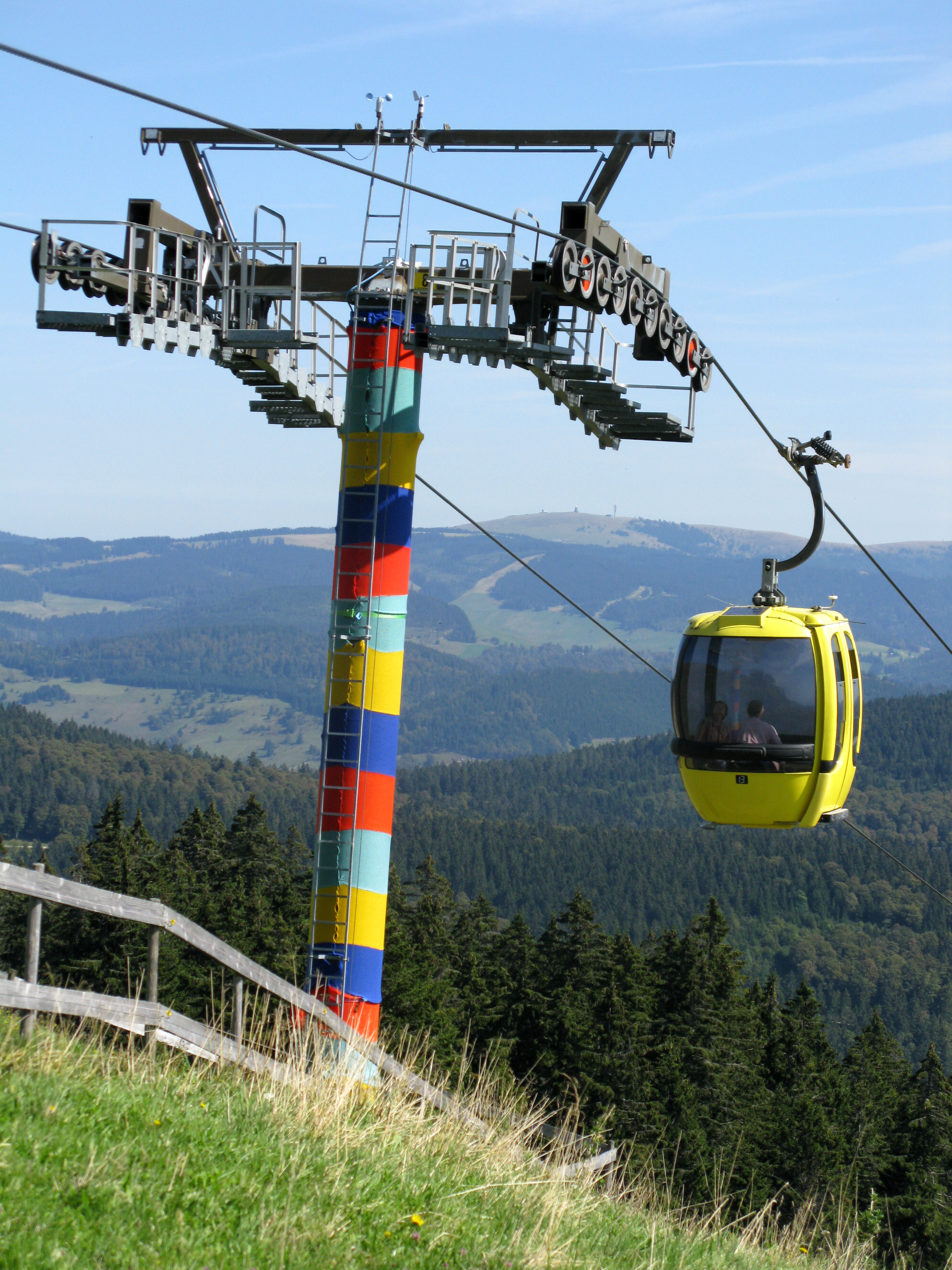
Gondola on the Belchenbahn

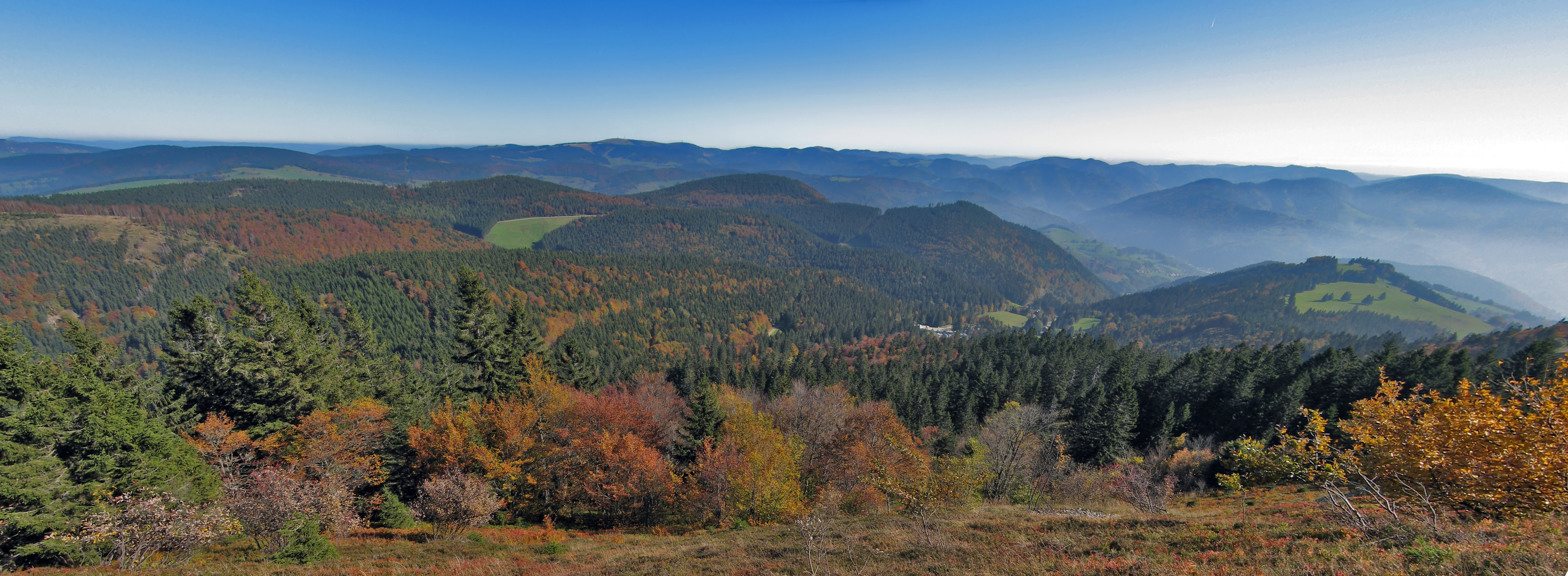
View upon Feldberg
