= Belchen system =

The Belchen system

The Belchen system comprises five mountains with the name Belchen around the point where the borders of Germany, France, and Switzerland meet. The term is an extension of the Belchen triangle. The mountains are:

- Belchen, or Black Forest Belchen
- Belchenflue, or Swiss Belchen
- Ballon d'Alsace, or Alsatian Belchen
- Grand Ballon, or Great Belchen
- Petit Ballon, or Little Belchen

== Geographical description ==
The heart of the Belchen system is the southernmost mountain of the Vosges, the Ballon d'Alsace (Elsässer Belchen or Alsatian Belchen, 1,247 metres). Seventy three kilometres due east is the Black Forest Belchen (Schwarzwälder Belchen, 1,414 metres), which is only 167 metres higher and over which the sun rises at the equinoxes, i.e. at the beginning of spring and autumn, as seen from Grand Ballon. Conversely, the sun sets over the Alsatian Belchen on these days when seen from the Black Forest Belchen.

Viewed from the Alsatian Belchen at the time of the summer solstice, the sun rises over Petit Ballon (Kleiner Belchen or Little Belchen, 1,272 metres), 27 kilometres away to the northeast. At the winter solstice it rises over the Belchenflue (Schweizer Belchen or Swiss Belchen, 1,099 metres), 88 kilometres to the southeast. Thus from the Alsatian Belchen the start of all four astronomical seasons is defined.

The region of the Belchen system is known today as the Upper Rhine, the Regio Basiliensis, the Dreiland or RegioTriRhena.

Mountains of the Belchen system

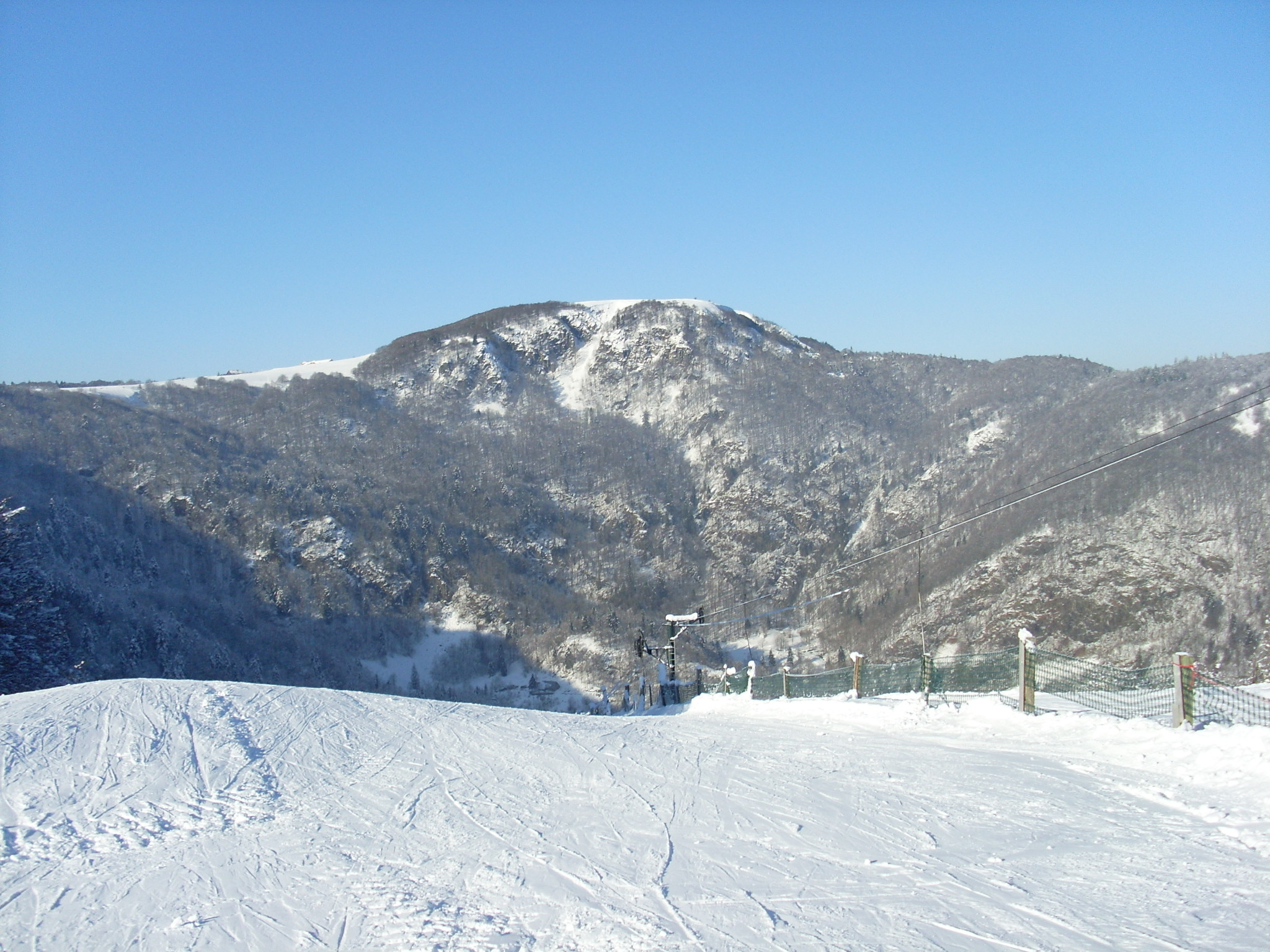
Alsace Belchen

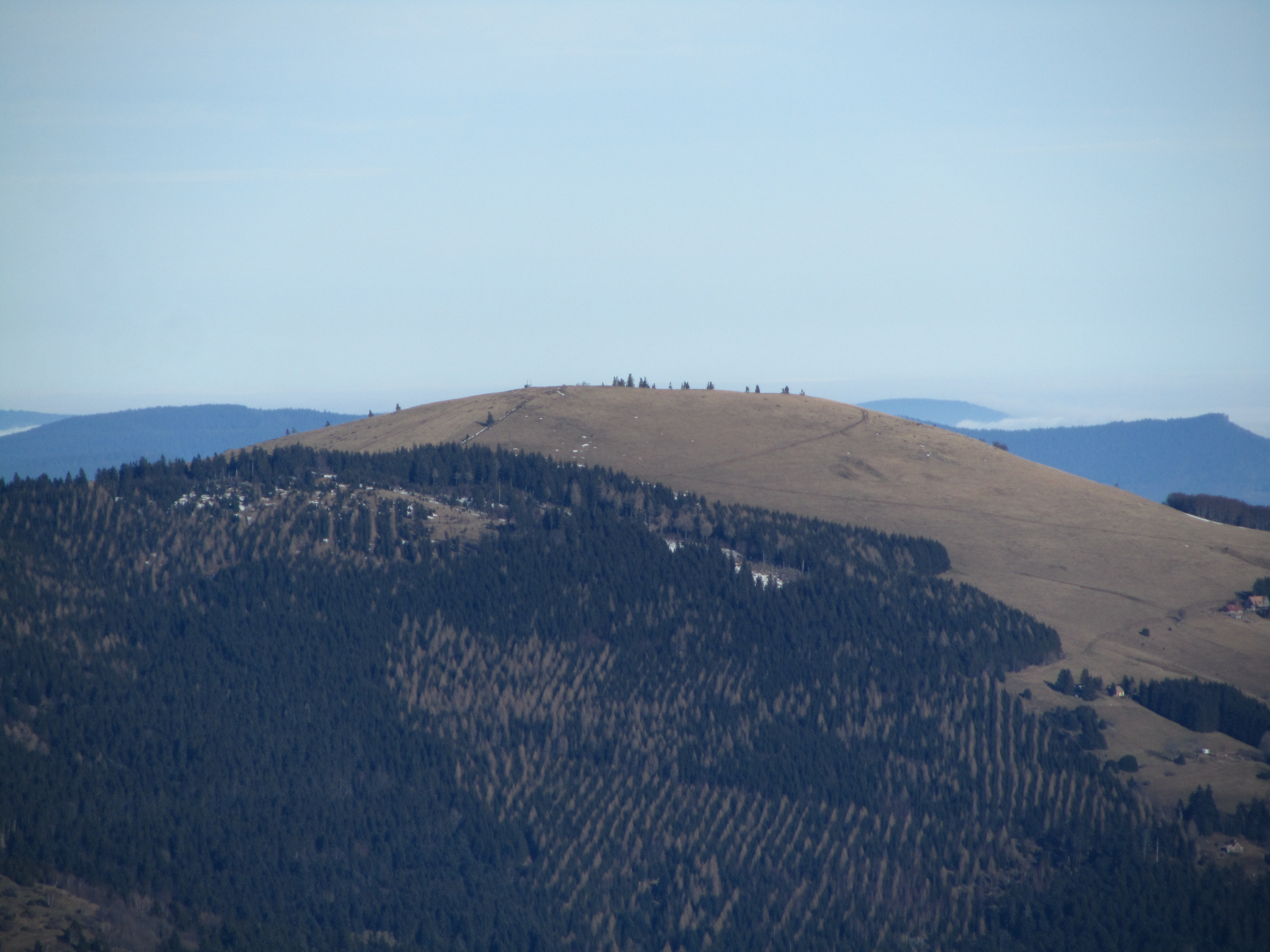
Little Belchen

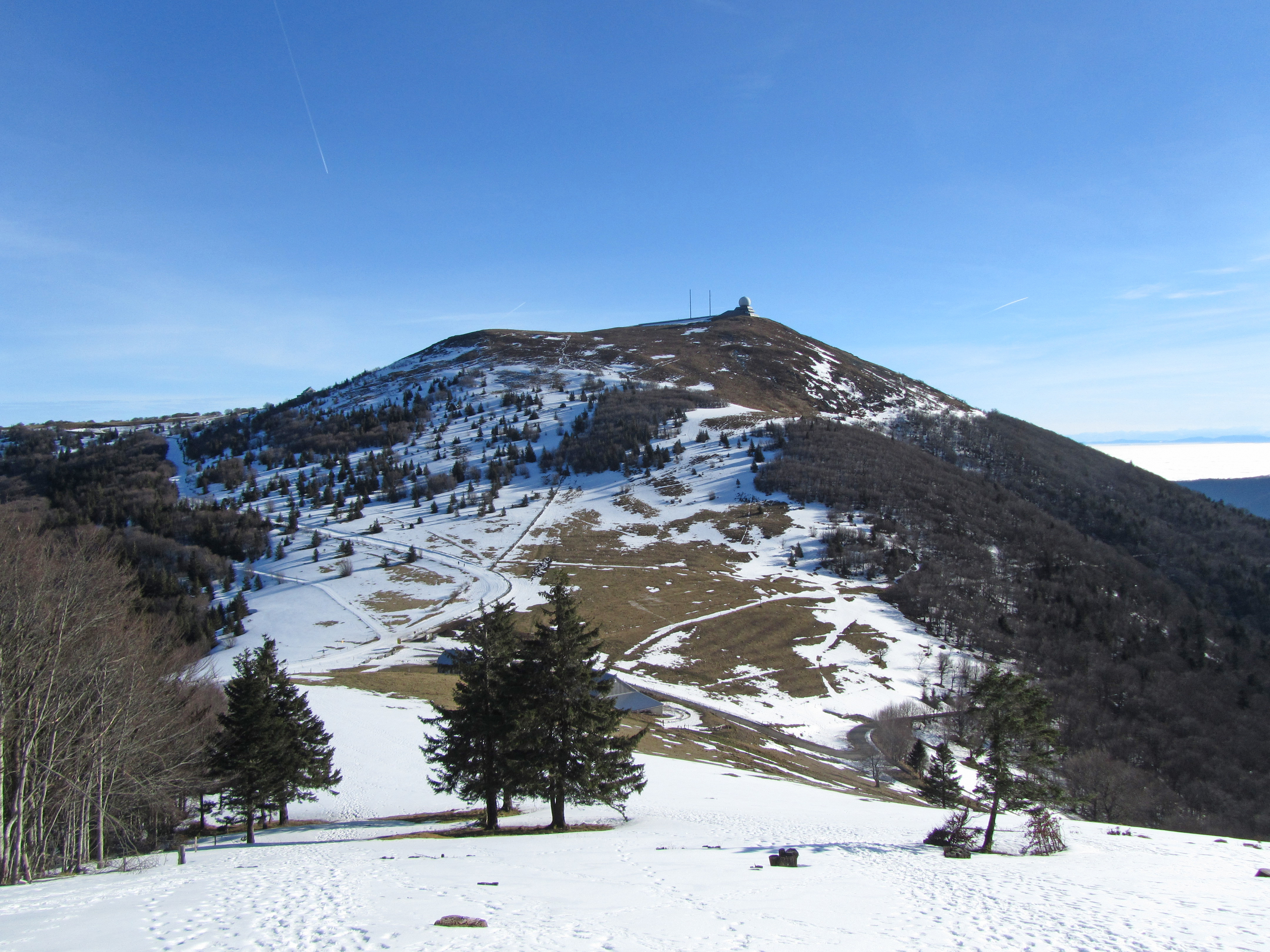
Great Belchen

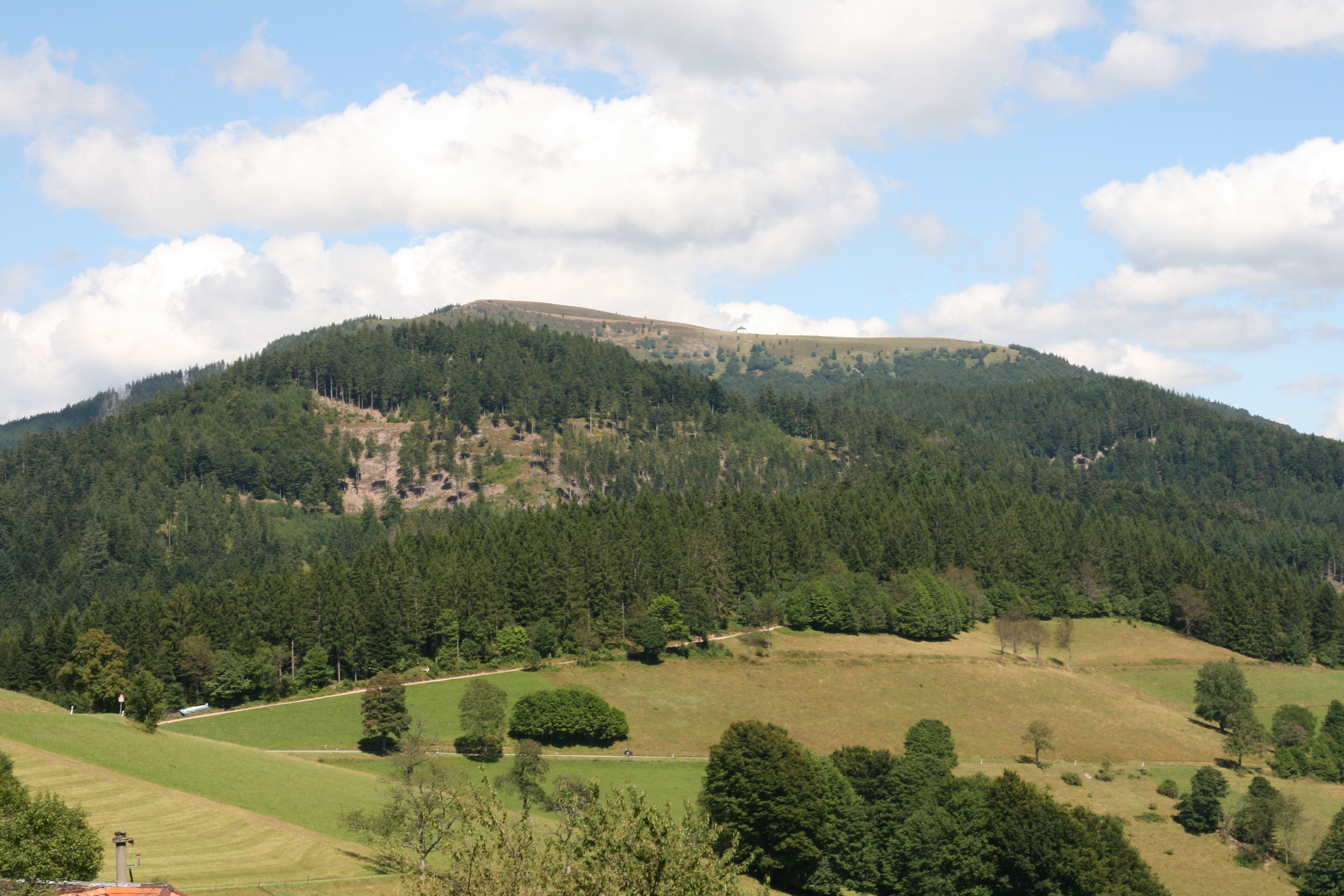
Black Forest Belchen

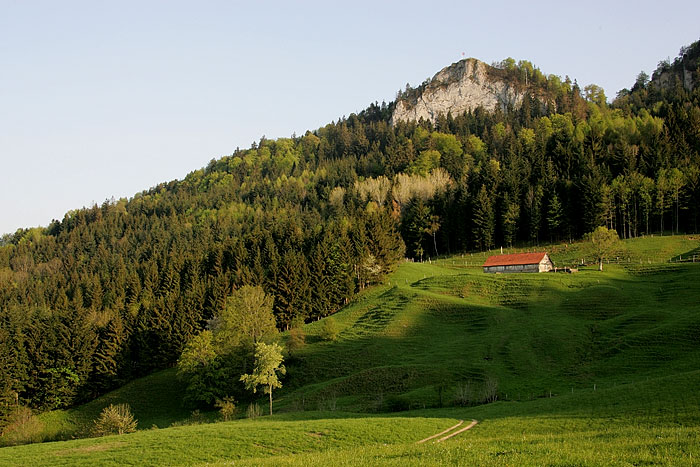
Swiss Belchen

== See also ==
- Belchen Tunnel under the Belchenflue
