= Belchenflue =

Mountain in Switzerland

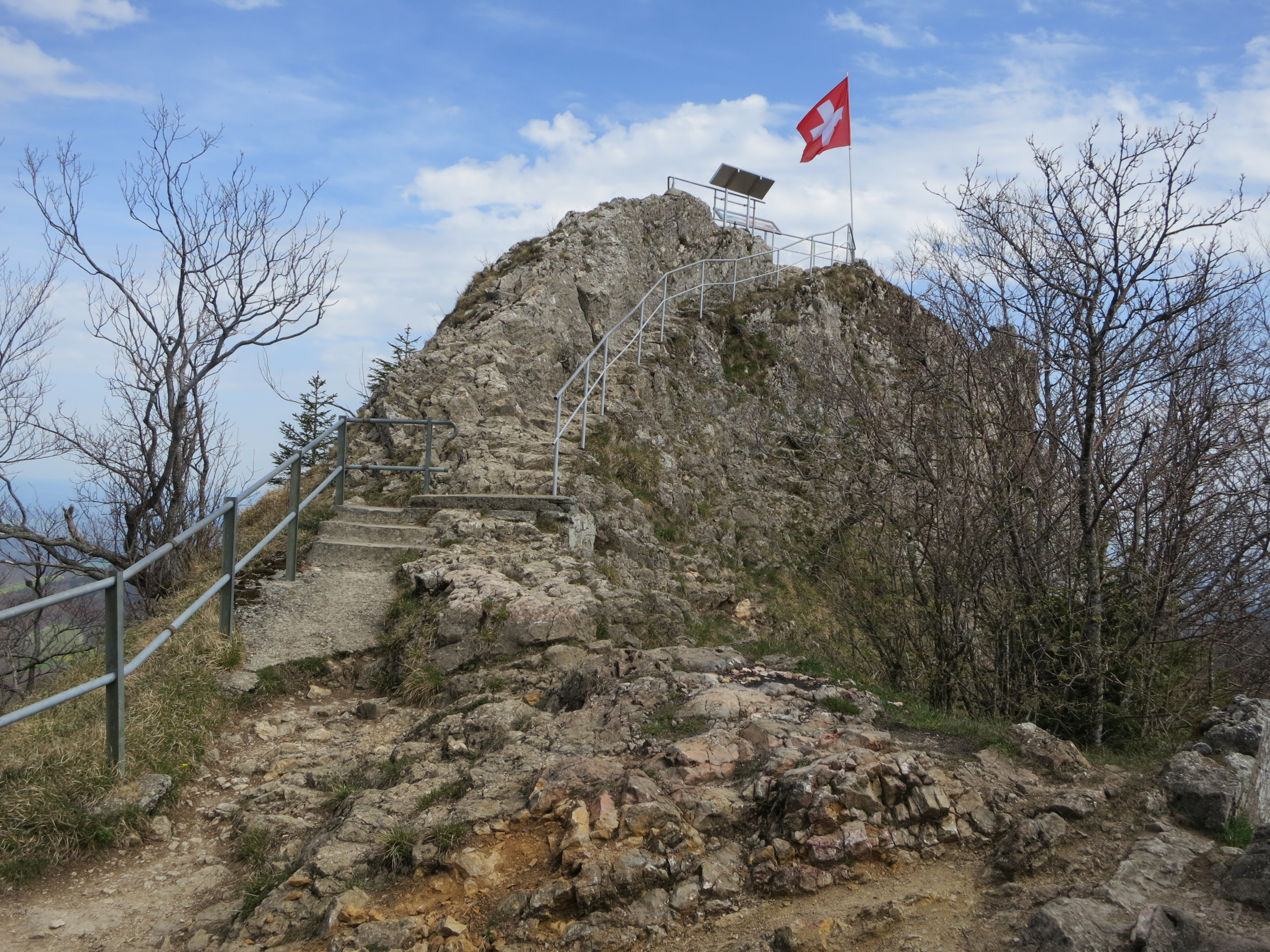
- The summit

Highest point
- Elevation: 1,099 m (3,606 ft)
- Prominence: 44 m (144 ft)
- Parent peak: Ruchen
- Coordinates: 47°21′46″N 7°48′38″E

Geography
- Location within Switzerland
- Location: Basel-Landschaft/Solothurn, Switzerland
- Parent range: Jura Mountains

The Belchenflue is a mountain of the Jura, located on the border between the Swiss cantons of Basel-Landschaft and Solothurn, south of Eptingen. The nearby Belchenflue Pass links the two cantons.

The mountain is also known as the Swiss Belchen (Schweizer Belchen) and is part of the so-called Belchen system, a group of mountains with the name "Belchen" that may have been part of a Celtic sun calendar.

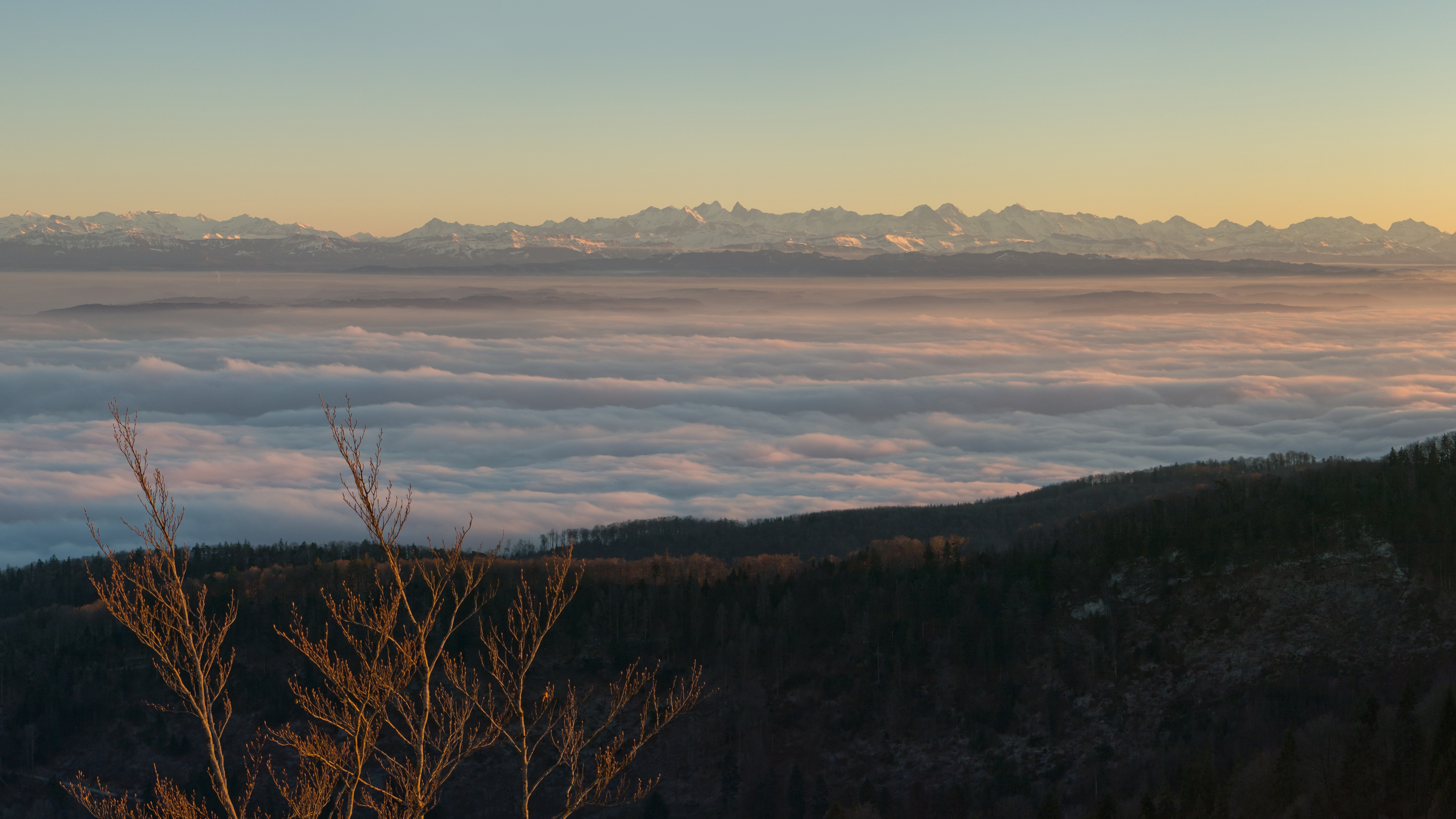
Distant view from the Belchenflue to the Bernese Alps in a distance of about 100 km

== See also ==
- Belchen Tunnel
