= Chli Windgällen =

Mountain in Switzerland

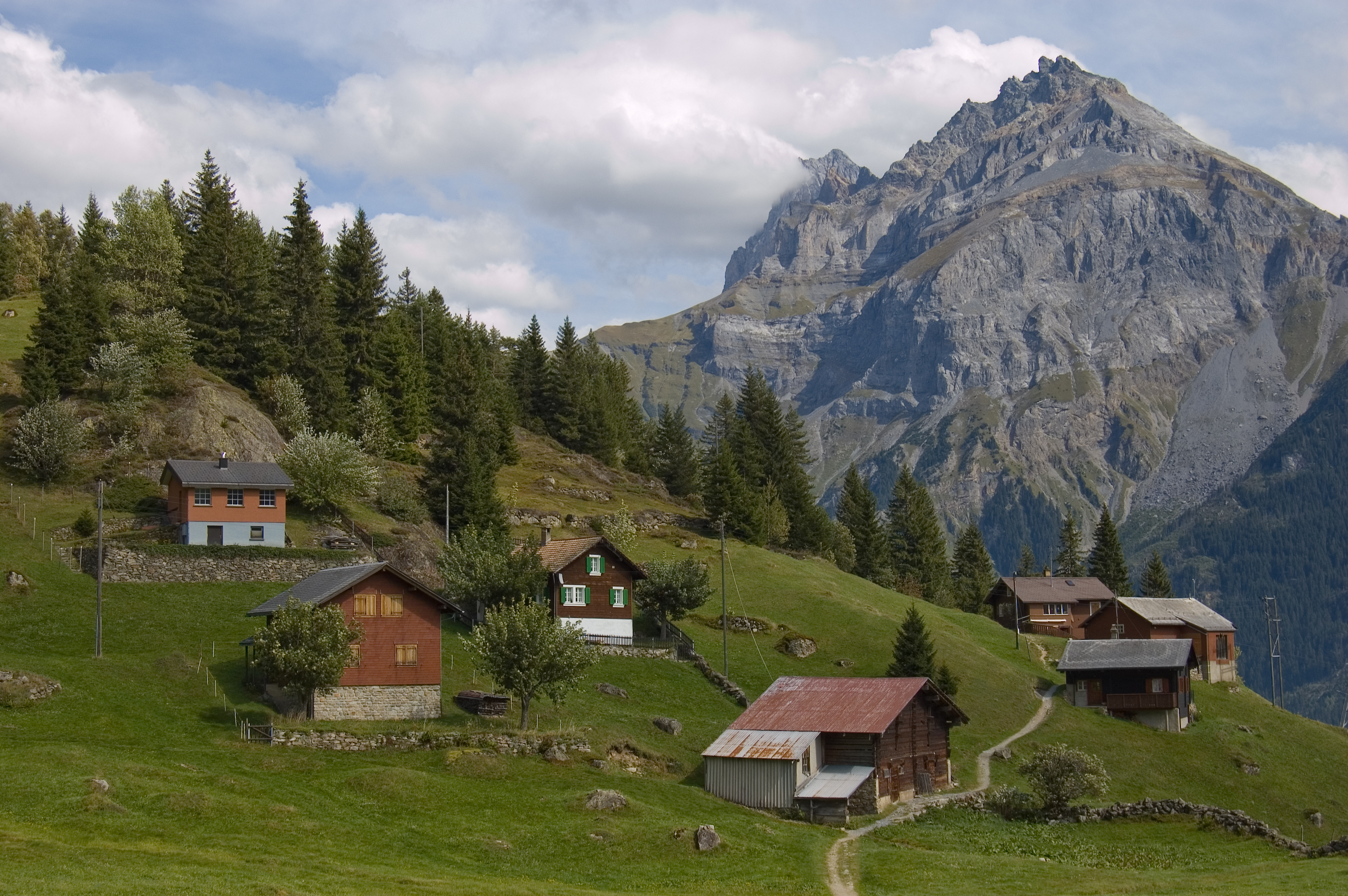
- Chli Windgällen from Arnisee (west side)

Highest point
- Elevation: 2,986 m (9,797 ft)
- Prominence: 265 m (869 ft)
- Parent peak: Gross Windgällen
- Coordinates: 46°47′42″N 8°42′58″E

Geography
- Location within Switzerland
- Location: Uri, Switzerland
- Parent range: Glarus Alps

The Chli Windgällen (2,986 m) is a mountain of the Glarus Alps, overlooking the valley of the Reuss in the canton of Uri. It lies west of the Gross Windgällen, on the range north of the Maderanertal.
