= Ruchen (Jura Mountains) =

Mountain in Switzerland

- Location within Switzerland

Highest point
- Elevation: 1,123 m (3,684 ft)
- Prominence: 392 m (1,286 ft)
- Coordinates: 47°21′44″N 7°48′23″E

Geography
- Location: Basel-Landschaft/Solothurn
- Country: Switzerland
- Parent range: Jura Mountains
- Topo map: Swiss Federal Office of Topography swisstopo

The Ruchen is a mountain of the Jura, located on the border between the Swiss cantons of Basel-Landschaft and Solothurn. It lies between Langenbruck and Eptingen. The Ruchen is the easternmost summit above 1,100 metres in the Jura Mountains. East of the Ruchen is the Belchenflue.
