= Chilchzimmersattel =

Mountain pass in Basel, Switzerland

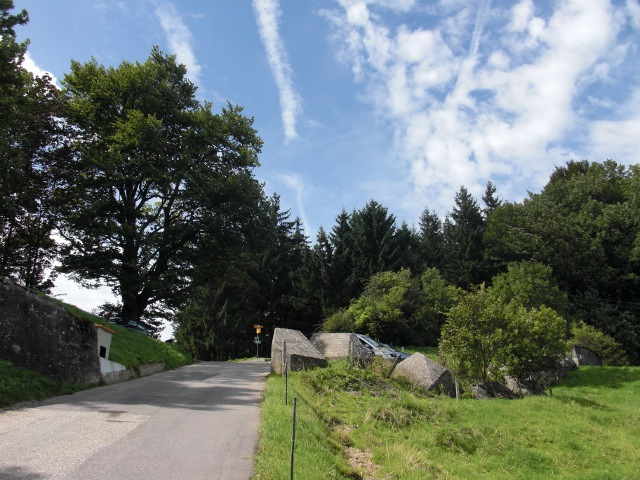
- Interactive map of Chilchzimmersattel
- Elevation: 991 m (3,251 ft)

Third Approach
- Location: Switzerland
- Range: Jura Mountains
- Coordinates: 47°22′1″N 7°48′10″E

Chilchzimmersattel (el. 991 m.) is a mountain pass in the Jura Mountains in the canton of Basel-Country in Switzerland.

It connects Eptingen and Langenbruck. The pass road has a maximum grade of 7,35 percent. The pass is open all year round, even though it is not cleared after snowstorms.

Numerous fortifications can be seen near the pass, dating from World War I and before.
