= Challhöchi Pass =

Mountain pass in Switzerland

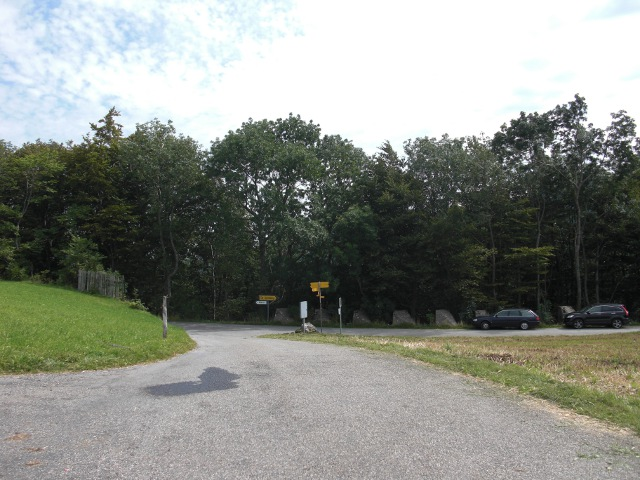
- Interactive map of Challhöchi Pass
- Elevation: 848 metres (2,782 ft)

Third Approach
- Location: Switzerland
- Range: Jura Mountains
- Coordinates: 47.36922°N 7.8342247°E

Challhöchi Pass (el. 848 m.) is a mountain pass in the Jura Mountains on the border of the cantons of Basel-Country and Solothurn in Switzerland. The pass road links Eptingen and Ifenthal or Hägendorf.
