= Seewlisee =

Lake in Uri, Switzerland

- Location within Canton of Uri Location within Switzerland Location within Alps
- Interactive map of Seewlisee
- Location: Uri
- Coordinates: 46°48′40″N 8°42′52″E
- Basin countries: Switzerland
- Surface area: 9 ha (22 acres)
- Surface elevation: 2,028 m (6,654 ft)

Seewlisee (or Seewli) is a lake in Uri, Switzerland at an elevation of 2028 m. Its surface area is 9 ha (22 acres). The lake lies at the foot of the Gross Windgällen.

The lake can be reached by foot in 2–3 hours from the cable car Silenen-Chilcherbergen.

== See also ==
- List of mountain lakes of Switzerland
