= Wasserbourg =

Commune in Grand Est, France

Wasserbourg Wàsserburig
- Commune
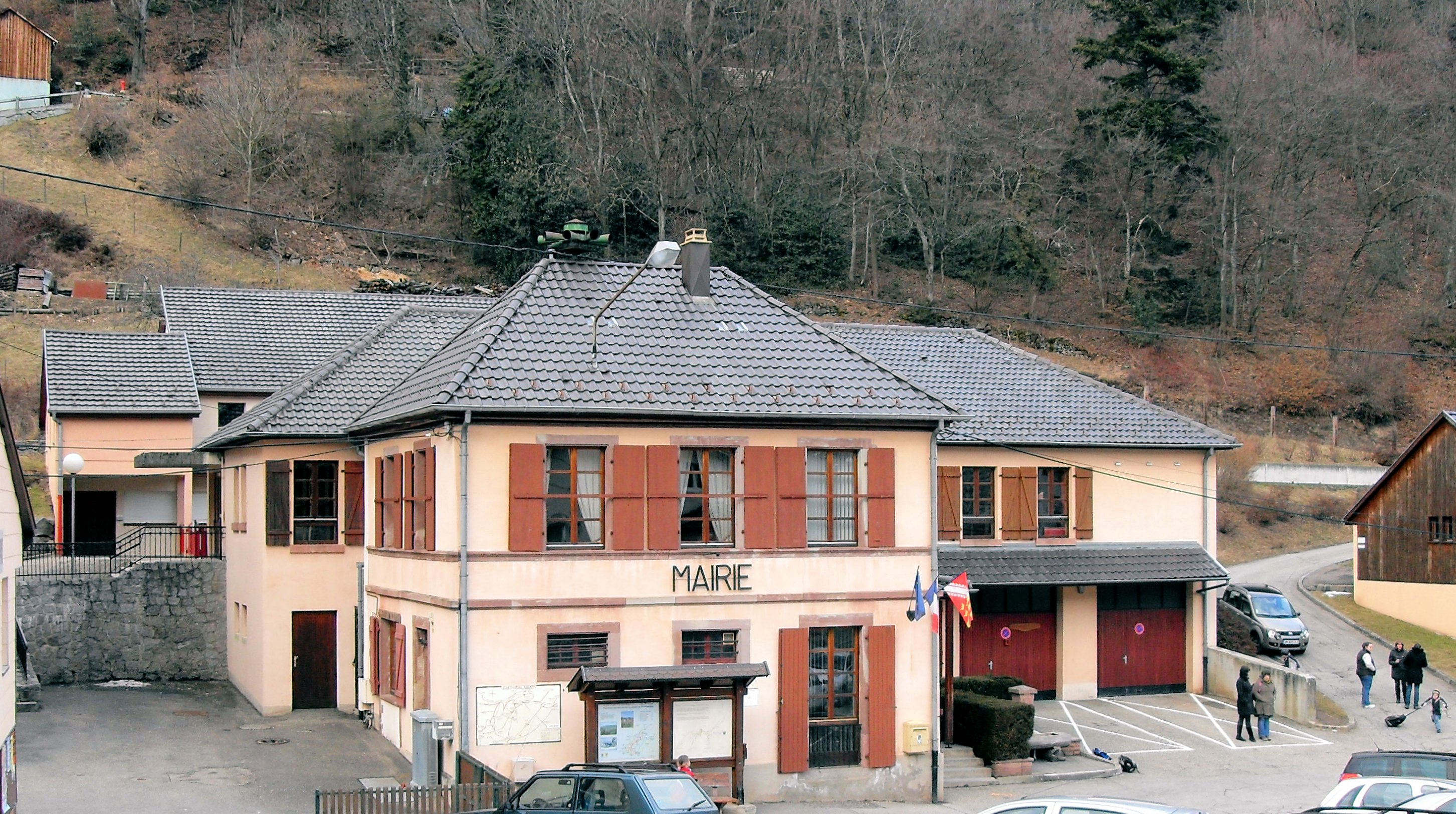
- The town hall in Wasserbourg

- Coat of arms
- Location of Wasserbourg
- Location within France Location within Grand Est
- Coordinates: 48°00′13″N 7°09′33″E
- Country: France
- Region: Grand Est
- Department: Haut-Rhin
- Arrondissement: Colmar-Ribeauvillé
- Canton: Wintzenheim
- Intercommunality: Vallée de Munster

Government
  - Mayor (2020–2026): Jean François Kabucz
- Area^{1}: 9.47 km^{2} (3.66 sq mi)
- Elevation: 530 m (1,740 ft)
- Highest elevation: 1,240 m (4,070 ft)
- Lowest elevation: 418 m (1,371 ft)
- Population (2023): 465
  - Density: 49.1/km^{2} (127/sq mi)
- Time zone: UTC+01:00 (CET)
  - Summer (DST): UTC+02:00 (CEST)
- INSEE/Postal code: 68358 /68230
- ^{1} French Land Register data, which excludes lakes, ponds, glaciers > 1 km^{2} (0.386 sq mi or 247 acres) and river estuaries.

Wasserbourg (Alemannic German: Wàsserburig; German: Wasserburg) is a commune in the Haut-Rhin department in Grand Est in north-eastern France.

== Geography ==
Wasserbourg is situated in the Vosges Mountains, in the valley of the small river Krebsbach, and at the foot of the summit “Petit Ballon”. Surface area: 947 hectares.

== History ==
The village was first mentioned in the 9th century. The first village name was Wasenberg until the 17th century, because of the field. The ruins of the Castle Strohbourg built in 1222, by Andréas de Gisberg, still stand today. It was probably inhabited until the 17th century. But the access is forbidden to the public. This castle, situated on the top of a hill, allowed villagers to be informed when an attack was imminent.

This castle appears on the coat of arms of the village.

During the Protestant Reform, only Wasserbourg and Soultzbach stayed Catholic: almost the whole Munster Valley is Protestant. The fact that these villages possess only one Church dates from this period (around 1550) During the First World War, a funicular, which began in Soultzbach-Les-Bains, was suspended above the village. We can observe the relics of its terminus on the “Petit Ballon”.

== Administration ==
Mayors of Wasserbourg
Term		Name
2020	-	Jean François Kabucz
2008	2020	Gilbert Ruhlmann
1989	2008	Jean-Paul Iltis
1977	1989	Raymond Resch
1959	1977	Camille Barb
1945	1959	Albert Kech

== Population ==
Historical population
Year	Pop.	±% p.a.
1968	308	—
1975	265	−2.13%
1982	271	+0.32%
1990	425	+5.79%
1999	473	+1.20%
2007	490	+0.44%
2012	454	−1.51%
2017	463	+0.39%
2023	465	+0.07%
Source: INSEE

== Monument ==
=== Church ===
The church is just after the city hall and is consecrated to St Michel. It was first built in the 13th century and was extended between 1830 and 1835. The Bell Tower was raised in 1870. Because of the First World War, the Church was damaged and was not renovated until 1923.

The organ in the Church was built in 1834 by Valentin Rinkenbach

=== Chapels ===
In the village, there are 5 little Chapels dedicated to the 4 Evangelists (St Marc, St Matthieu, St Luc, St Jean) and St Anne

=== Others ===
The Strohbourg ruins

== Activity and commerce ==
Two farmers work in the village. On the spring the transhumance is an important event in which cows go to the pastures. These farmers sell milk and Munster cheese. In summer, these farmers have inns (Wassmatt and Strohberg) which offer local specialities. People can discover these traditional moments into the “Maison du fromage” in Gunsbach.

== Demography and people ==
Some people still speak Alsatian. In 1999, most of the population was between 20 and 59 years old.

== See also ==
- Communes of the Haut-Rhin department
