= Gross Windgällen =

Mountain in Switzerland

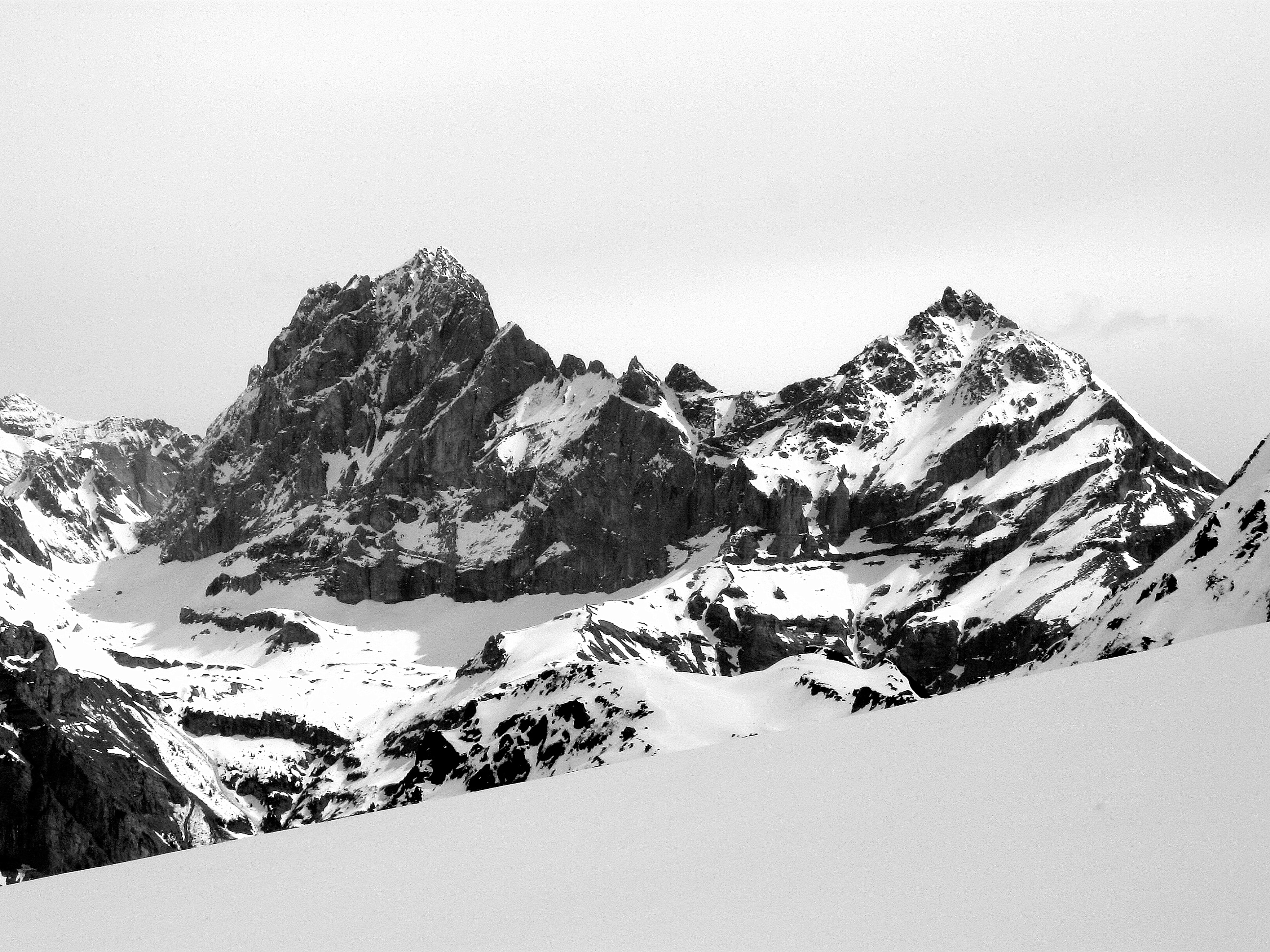
- Gross Windgällen (left) and Chli Windgällen (right) from the west side

Highest point
- Elevation: 3,187 m (10,456 ft)
- Prominence: 552 m (1,811 ft)
- Parent peak: Tödi
- Listing: Alpine mountains above 3000 m
- Coordinates: 46°48′26″N 8°43′56″E

Geography
- Location within Switzerland
- Location: Uri, Switzerland
- Parent range: Glarus Alps

The Gross Windgällen is a 3,187 m high mountain in the Glarus Alps, overlooking the valley of the Reuss in the canton of Uri. The name Gross Windgällen derives from Gälle or gellen, meaning as much as wailing, shrilling or whistling.

== Geography ==
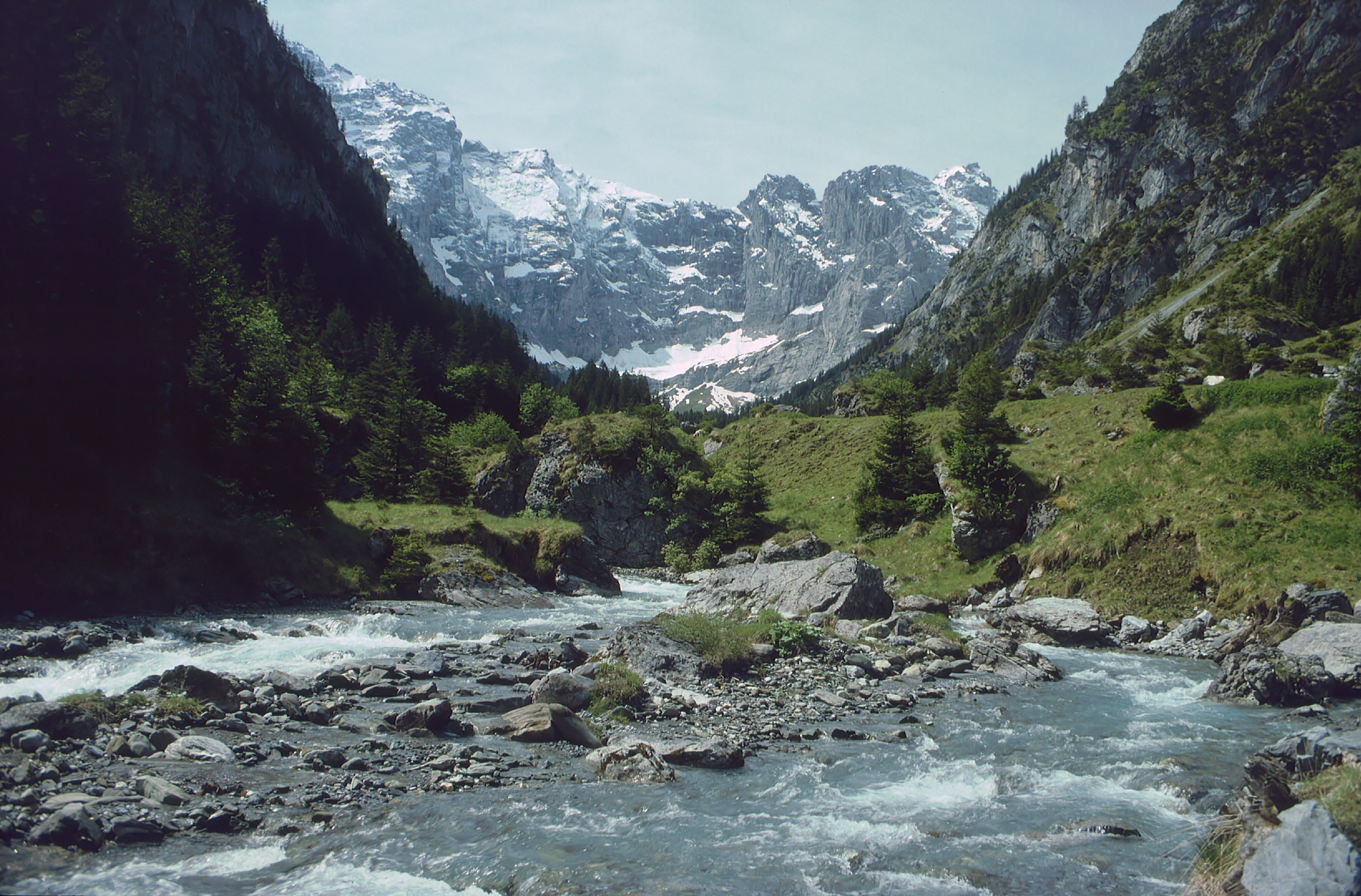
View of the Gross Wingällen (right summit) from the Brunnital.

The massif of the Gross Wingällen lies between two parallel valleys, the Schächental on the north side and the Maderanertal on the south side, both converging to the Reuss on the west at approximately 500 metres above sea level or 2,700 m below the summit. On the north side, the massif encloses a small valley, the Brunnital, which belong to the Schächental, thus forming an amphitheatre of several summits above 3,000 m, including the Gross Ruchen on the east; the north wall of the Gross Ruchen being connected with that of the Gross Windgällen.

Several glaciers can be found on the southern side of the mountain, among which the Stäfelfirn, located east of the summit. The north-west face is very steep and has no glaciers, it overlooks the small lake of Seewli (2,028 m). Two kilometres south-west of the Gross Windgällen lies the Chli Windgällen (2,986 m).

The closest locality is Golzern on its southern flanks at 1,400 m, from where the Gross Windgällen is usually climbed. The Windgällen hut, owned by the Academic Alpine Club of Zurich is located higher at 2,032 m. From there starts the normal route to the top, via the Stäfelfirn.

== Climbing ==
The first climbing was made in 1848 by a mountain guide from Uri, Josef Maria Tresch-Exer together with Melchior Tresch. This enabled Tresch-Exer for a subsequent climb to the summit together with Georg Hoffmann which took place ten days later.
