= Gross Ruchen =

Mountain in Switzerland

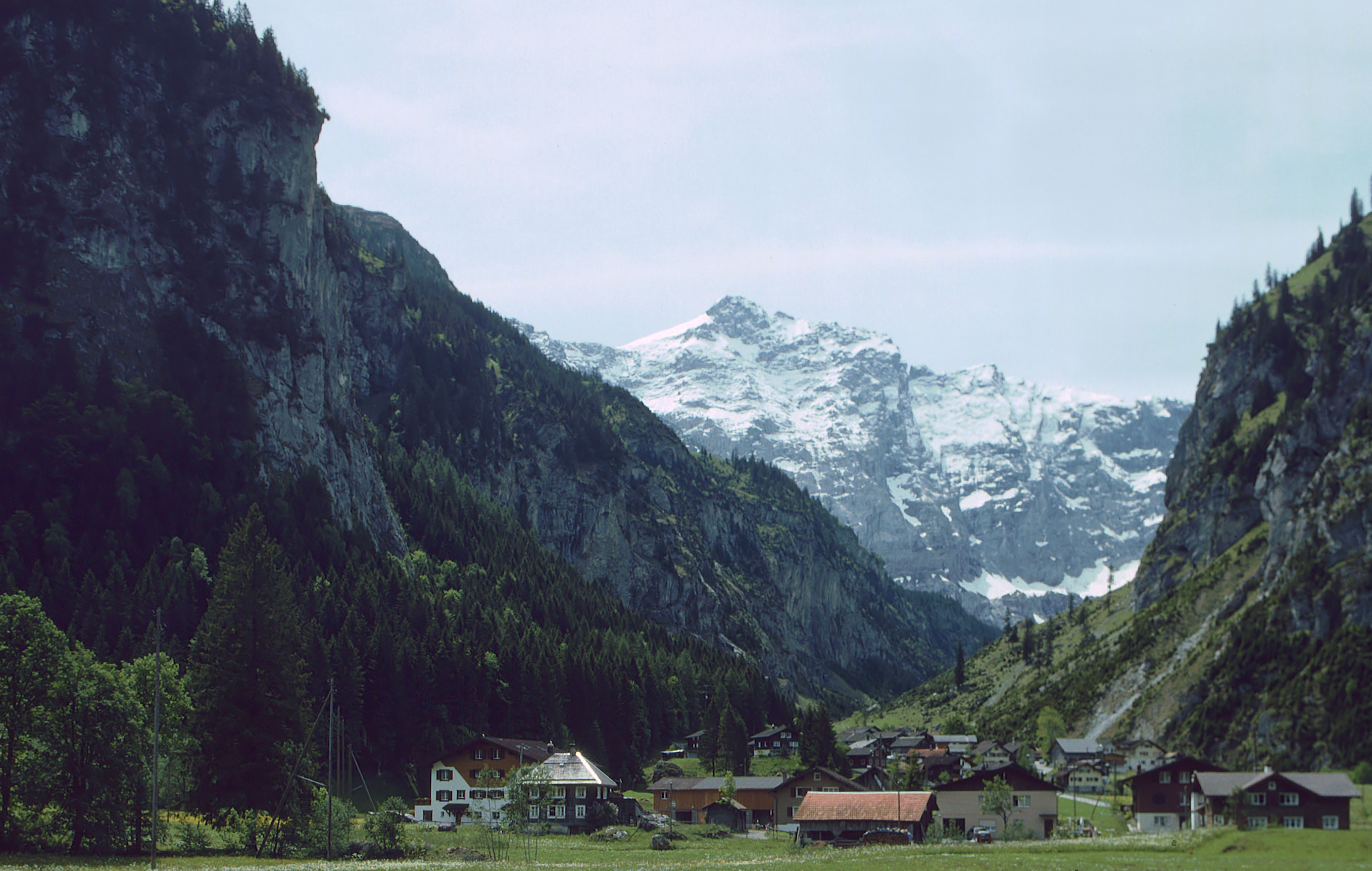
- The Gross Ruchen seen from the Brunnital

Highest point
- Elevation: 3,138 m (10,295 ft)
- Prominence: 397 m (1,302 ft)
- Parent peak: Gross Windgällen
- Listing: Alpine mountains above 3000 m
- Coordinates: 46°48′37″N 8°46′29″E

Naming
- English translation: Large Ruchen
- Language of name: German

Geography
- Location within Switzerland
- Location: Uri
- Country: Switzerland
- Parent range: Glarus Alps
- Topo map: Swiss Federal Office of Topography swisstopo

The Gross Ruchen is a mountain in the Glarus Alps, overlooking the Brunnital south of Unterschächen in the canton of Uri. It is located between the higher Gross Windgallen on the west and the Chli Ruchen on the east.

The north face is very steep and is linked with that of the Gross Windgällen. On the east flanks is the Ruchenfirn, a glacier lying between 2,600 and 3,100 metres.
