= Petit Ballon =

Mountain in France

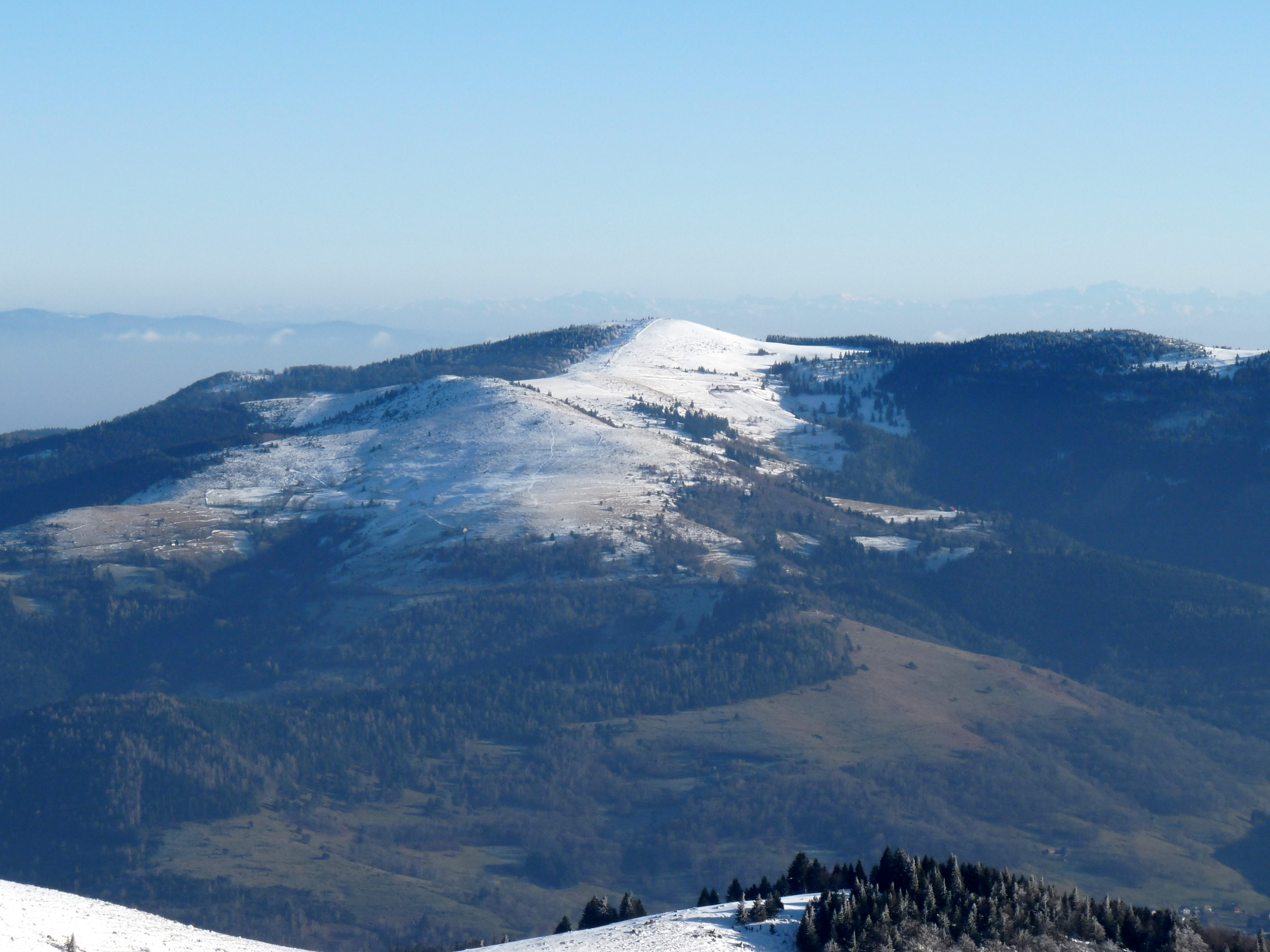
- The view of the Petit Ballon from Hohneck

Highest point
- Elevation: 1,272 m (4,173 ft)
- Prominence: 147 m (482 ft)
- Coordinates: 47°58′50″N 7°07′34″E

Naming
- English translation: The Little Balloon

Geography
- Location within France
- Location: Haut-Rhin, Alsace, France
- Parent range: Vosges Mountains

The Petit Ballon (German: Kleiner Belchen) or Little Belchen, is, at 1272 m, one of the highest peaks of the Vosges Mountains in the department of Haut-Rhin, Alsace, in France, about 5 km away from the village of Wasserbourg. The Rothenbrunnen mountain hut is 500m below. A car park is a further 500m away.

The Col du Petit Ballon pass (elevation 1,163 m (3,816 ft)) is close to the summit.

The mountain is part of the Belchen system, a group of mountains with the name "Belchen" (in German) that may have been part of a Celtic sun calendar.

== Bibliography ==
- Alsace and Lorraine Rough Guides Snapshot France Penguin, May 23, 2013
- A wayfarer in Alsace Bernard Stephen Townroe Houghton Mifflin, 1926
- Petit Futé Alsace Dominique Auzias, Jean-Paul Labourdette Petit Futé, Mar 3, 2010
- Trekking in the Vosges and Jura: the GR5, GR53 and other treks and walks. Les Smith, Elizabeth Smith Cicerone Press Limited, 2006
- Les plus beaux circuits en camping car 2014 Petit Futé (avec cartes, photos + avis des lecteurs) Collectif, Petit Futé, Dominique Auzias, Jean-Paul Labourdette Petit Futé, Feb 7, 2014
- Alsace. Hervé Lévy Petit Futé, 2009
- Alsace, Lorraine, Vosges. Manufacture française des pneumatiques Michelin, Pneu Michelin, 1989
