= Belchen Tunnel =

Tunnel in Switzerland

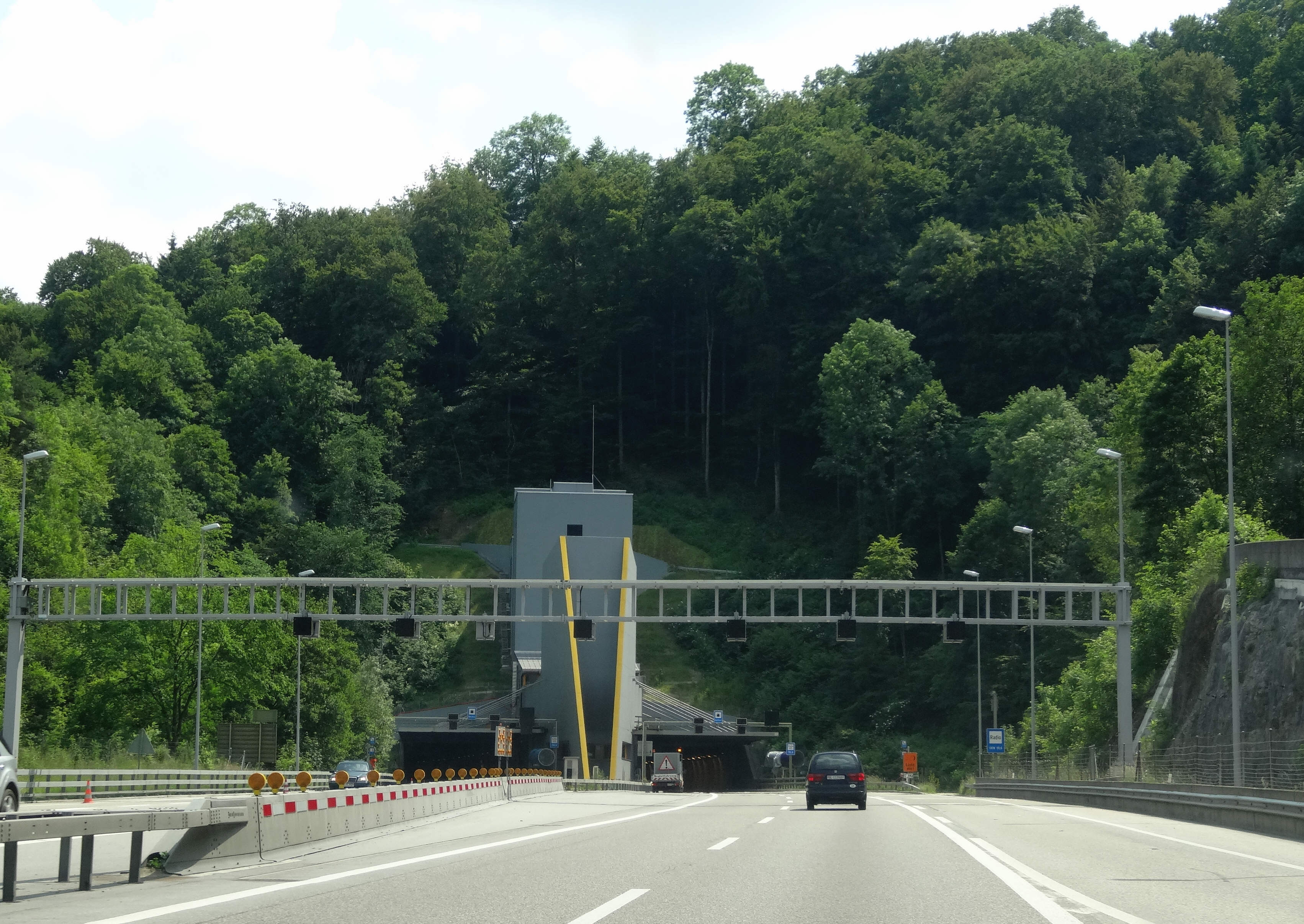
- North portal on A2 motorway heading south (2014)
- Interactive map of Belchen Tunnel

Overview
- Location: Basel-Country/Solothurn, Switzerland
- Coordinates: 47°22′2″N 7°49′28″E
- Status: Active
- Route: A2 motorway

Operation
- Work began: 1963
- Opened: 1970
- Character: road

Technical
- Length: 3,180 metres (10,430 ft)

The Belchen Tunnel is a motorway tunnel in Switzerland, and forms part of the A2 motorway from Basel to Chiasso. It links Eptingen in the canton of Basel-Country with Hägendorf in the Canton of Solothurn. The tunnel was opened in 1970, and is 3,180 metres (10,430 ft) long.
