= Chli Ruchen =

Mountain in Switzerland

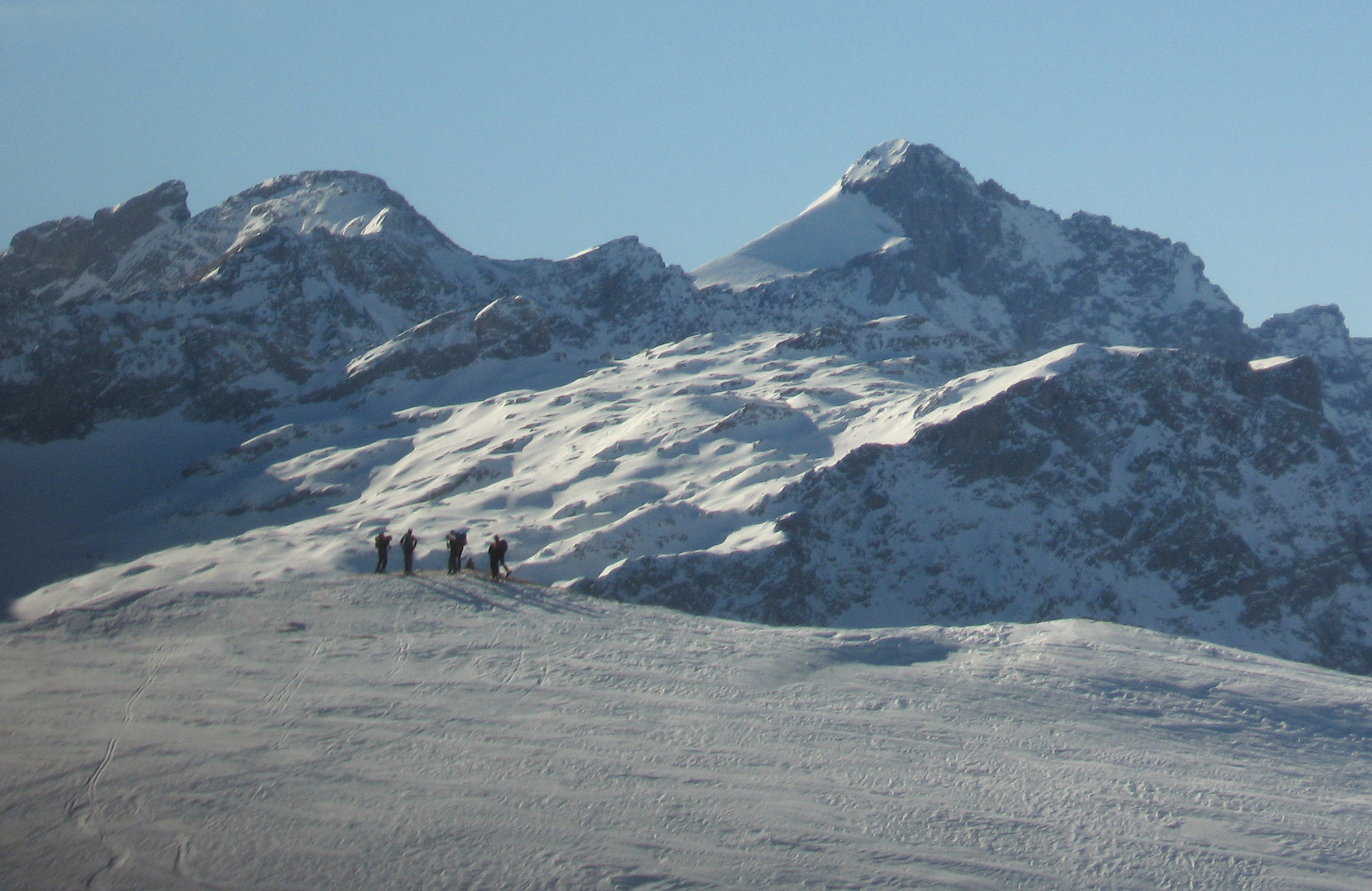
- Chli Ruchen (left) and Gross Ruchen (right)

Highest point
- Elevation: 2,944 m (9,659 ft)
- Prominence: 175 m (574 ft)
- Parent peak: Schärhorn
- Coordinates: 46°49′17″N 8°47′51″E

Naming
- English translation: Small Ruchen
- Language of name: Swiss German

Geography
- Location within Switzerland
- Location: Uri
- Country: Switzerland
- Parent range: Glarus Alps
- Topo map: Swiss Federal Office of Topography swisstopo

The Chli Ruchen (2,944 m) is a mountain of the Glarus Alps, overlooking the Brunnital south of Unterschächen in the canton of Uri. It is located between the higher Gross Ruchen on the west and the Schärhorn on the east.
