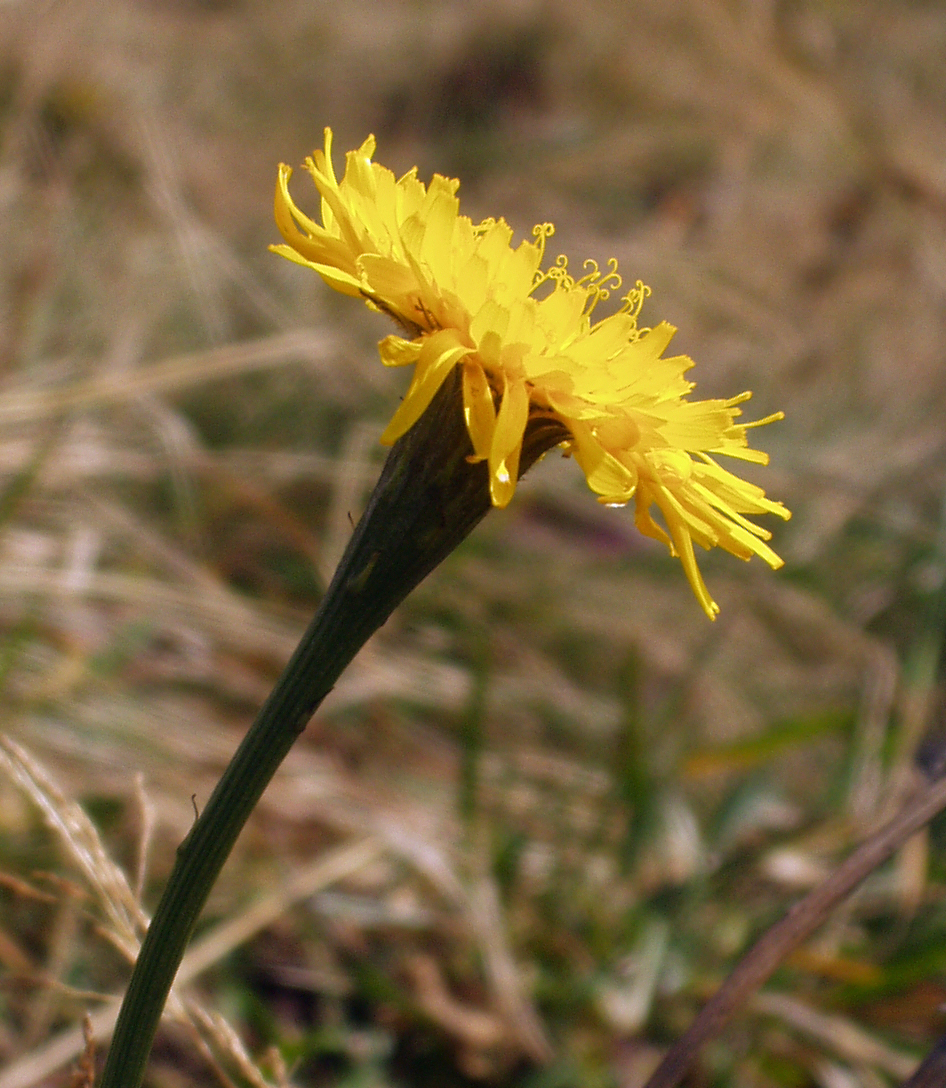
- Leontodon pyrenaicus subsp. helveticus

Scientific classification
- Kingdom: Plantae
- Clade: Tracheophytes
- Clade: Angiosperms
- Clade: Eudicots
- Clade: Asterids
- Order: Asterales
- Family: Asteraceae
- Genus: Leontodon
- Species: L. pyrenaicus

Binomial name
- Leontodon pyrenaicus Gouan

Subspecies
- L. pyrenaicus subsp. cantabricus L. pyrenaicus subsp. helveticus L. pyrenaicus subsp. pyrenaicus

Synonyms
- Scorzoneroides pyrenaica

= Leontodon pyrenaicus =

Species of flowering plant

Leontodon pyrenaicus is a species of hawkbit found in the Alps, Pyrenees, Cantabrian Mountains, northern Apennines and northern parts of the Balkan Peninsula. It grows in meadows and on stony slopes from the tree line to over 3000 m, usually on acidic soils. It is perennial, and flowers from June to August.

The stems of L. pyrenaicus are narrow, up to 30 cm long, with several scale-like leaves, and with a single flower head at the top. The leaves form a basal rosette, and are clearly stalked. The flower heads are 20–20 mm wide and bright yellow.

L. pyrenaicus is divided into three allopatric subspecies which differ in their size and in the nature of the hairs on the bracts:

- L. pyrenaicus subsp. cantabricus lives in the Cantabrian Mountains
- L. pyrenaicus subsp. helveticus lives in the Alps, Apennines and Balkans
- L. pyrenaicus subsp. pyrenaicus lives in the Pyrenees

A number of authors since 2006, based on molecular evidence, have divided the genus Leontodon into two, with the former subgenus Oporinia split out into the genus Scorzoneroides. If this is done, L. pyrenaicus is placed in Scorzoneroides as S. pyrenaica. It is also common for the subspecies to be considered separate species, in which case they are called Leontodon cantabricus (or Scorzoneroides cantabrica), L. helveticus (S. helvetica) and L. pyrenaicus (S. pyrenaica).
