= Ballon d'Alsace =

Mountain in France

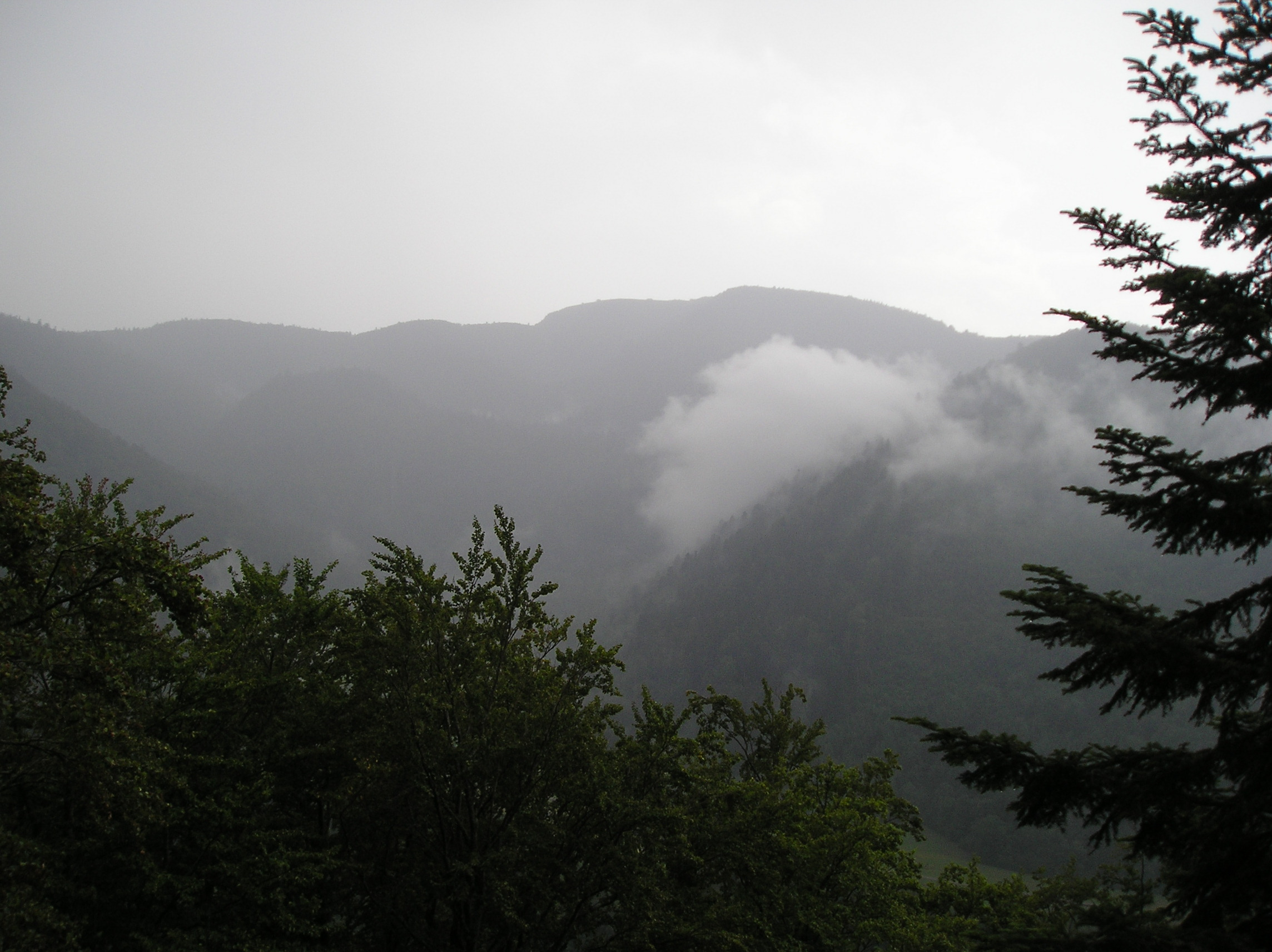

Highest point
- Elevation: 1,247 m (4,091 ft)
- Prominence: 217 m (712 ft)
- Isolation: 5.62 km (3.49 mi)
- Coordinates: 47°49′20″N 6°50′43″E

Geography
- Location within France
- Location: France
- Parent range: Vosges

The Ballon d'Alsace (French pronunciation: [balɔ̃ dalzas]; German: Elsässer Belchen, pronounced [ˈɛlzɛsɐ ˈbɛlçn̩]) (el. 1247 m.), sometimes also called the Alsatian Belchen to distinguish it from other mountains named "Belchen") is a mountain at the border of Alsace, Lorraine, and Franche-Comté. From its top, views include the Vosges, the Rhine valley, the Black Forest, and the Alps.

A road leads over a pass near the peak at the Col du Ballon d'Alsace, 1,171 m (3,842 ft). The pass is noted as the site of the first official mountain climb in the Tour de France on 11 July 1905, the first rider to the top of the climb being René Pottier and the stage being won by Hippolyte Aucouturier. Stage 9 of the 2005 Tour crossed this pass on the centenary of the original climb.

Ballon d'Alsace features Alpine and Cross Country skiing tracks.

The mountain is part of the so-called Belchen system, a group of mountains with the name "Belchen" (in German) that may have been part of a Celtic sun calendar.

== Geography ==
=== Climate ===
Ballon d'Alsace has a humid continental climate (Köppen climate classification Dfb). The average annual temperature in Ballon d'Alsace is 6.6 °C (43.9 °F). The average annual rainfall is 2,263.6 mm (89.12 in) with December as the wettest month. The temperatures are highest on average in July, at around 14.9 °C (58.8 °F), and lowest in January, at around −1.2 °C (29.8 °F). The highest temperature ever recorded in Ballon d'Alsace was 32.3 °C (90.1 °F) on 24 July 2019; the coldest temperature ever recorded was −19.1 °C (−2.4 °F) on 20 December 2009.

Climate data for Ballon d'Alsace (1991–2020 averages, extremes 1987−present); elevation 1153m
Month	Jan	Feb	Mar	Apr	May	Jun	Jul	Aug	Sep	Oct	Nov	Dec	Year
Record high °C (°F)	14.3 (57.7)	17.0 (62.6)	18.4 (65.1)	22.5 (72.5)	26.4 (79.5)	29.7 (85.5)	32.3 (90.1)	31.3 (88.3)	26.3 (79.3)	22.4 (72.3)	18.5 (65.3)	13.8 (56.8)	32.3 (90.1)
Mean daily maximum °C (°F)	1.1 (34.0)	1.4 (34.5)	4.7 (40.5)	9.3 (48.7)	13.4 (56.1)	17.0 (62.6)	18.6 (65.5)	18.4 (65.1)	14.3 (57.7)	10.3 (50.5)	5.1 (41.2)	2.0 (35.6)	9.6 (49.3)
Daily mean °C (°F)	−1.2 (29.8)	−1.0 (30.2)	1.9 (35.4)	5.8 (42.4)	9.6 (49.3)	13.2 (55.8)	14.9 (58.8)	14.9 (58.8)	11.1 (52.0)	7.6 (45.7)	2.8 (37.0)	−0.2 (31.6)	6.6 (43.9)
Mean daily minimum °C (°F)	−3.4 (25.9)	−3.5 (25.7)	−1.0 (30.2)	2.4 (36.3)	5.9 (42.6)	9.4 (48.9)	11.2 (52.2)	11.3 (52.3)	7.9 (46.2)	4.9 (40.8)	0.5 (32.9)	−2.4 (27.7)	3.6 (38.5)
Record low °C (°F)	−15.9 (3.4)	−18.8 (−1.8)	−15.7 (3.7)	−9.3 (15.3)	−3.6 (25.5)	−0.9 (30.4)	3.9 (39.0)	2.5 (36.5)	−0.2 (31.6)	−7.7 (18.1)	−13.8 (7.2)	−19.1 (−2.4)	−19.1 (−2.4)
Average precipitation mm (inches)	251.9 (9.92)	203.9 (8.03)	196.5 (7.74)	123.7 (4.87)	178.8 (7.04)	134.6 (5.30)	148.8 (5.86)	157.1 (6.19)	154.0 (6.06)	210.5 (8.29)	215.2 (8.47)	288.6 (11.36)	2,263.6 (89.12)
Average precipitation days (≥ 1.0 mm)	15.3	14.8	14.0	12.4	14.7	12.4	12.5	13.1	10.9	13.7	14.7	16.3	164.9
Source: Météo-France

Climate data for Ballon De Servance, 1213m (1991–2020 normals)
Month	Jan	Feb	Mar	Apr	May	Jun	Jul	Aug	Sep	Oct	Nov	Dec	Year
Record high °C (°F)	13.4 (56.1)	16.2 (61.2)	18.0 (64.4)	22.0 (71.6)	25.4 (77.7)	30.6 (87.1)	31.2 (88.2)	30.8 (87.4)	25.8 (78.4)	22.2 (72.0)	18.1 (64.6)	14.6 (58.3)	31.2 (88.2)
Mean daily maximum °C (°F)	0.7 (33.3)	0.9 (33.6)	4.3 (39.7)	9.5 (49.1)	12.4 (54.3)	16.3 (61.3)	18.5 (65.3)	17.5 (63.5)	14.4 (57.9)	10.3 (50.5)	5.2 (41.4)	1.9 (35.4)	9.3 (48.8)
Daily mean °C (°F)	−1.4 (29.5)	−1.3 (29.7)	1.6 (34.9)	6.2 (43.2)	9.0 (48.2)	12.8 (55.0)	14.9 (58.8)	14.1 (57.4)	11.2 (52.2)	7.6 (45.7)	3.0 (37.4)	−0.2 (31.6)	6.5 (43.6)
Mean daily minimum °C (°F)	−3.5 (25.7)	−3.5 (25.7)	−1.1 (30.0)	2.9 (37.2)	5.6 (42.1)	9.4 (48.9)	11.4 (52.5)	10.7 (51.3)	8.1 (46.6)	5.0 (41.0)	0.8 (33.4)	−2.4 (27.7)	3.6 (38.5)
Record low °C (°F)	−12.6 (9.3)	−18.3 (−0.9)	−12.8 (9.0)	−9.2 (15.4)	−4.1 (24.6)	−0.9 (30.4)	3.0 (37.4)	2.2 (36.0)	0.3 (32.5)	−7.2 (19.0)	−11.3 (11.7)	−20.1 (−4.2)	−20.1 (−4.2)
Average precipitation mm (inches)	190.7 (7.51)	141.0 (5.55)	160.4 (6.31)	94.1 (3.70)	171.1 (6.74)	137.1 (5.40)	146.4 (5.76)	148.7 (5.85)	138.5 (5.45)	161.6 (6.36)	171.8 (6.76)	221.5 (8.72)	1,882.9 (74.11)
Source: Météo-France

== Gallery ==
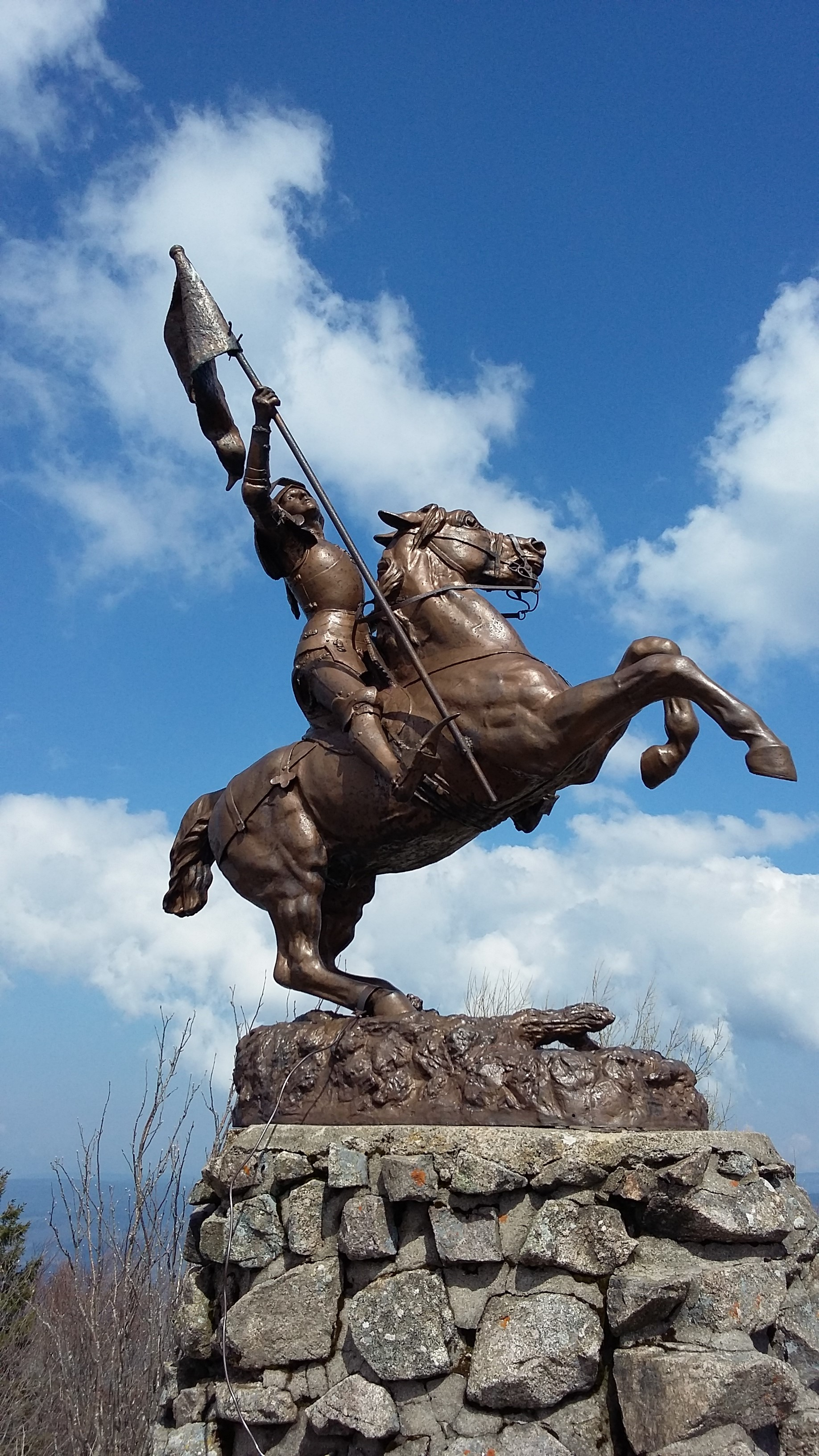
Statue of Jeanne d'Arc at Ballon d'Alsace

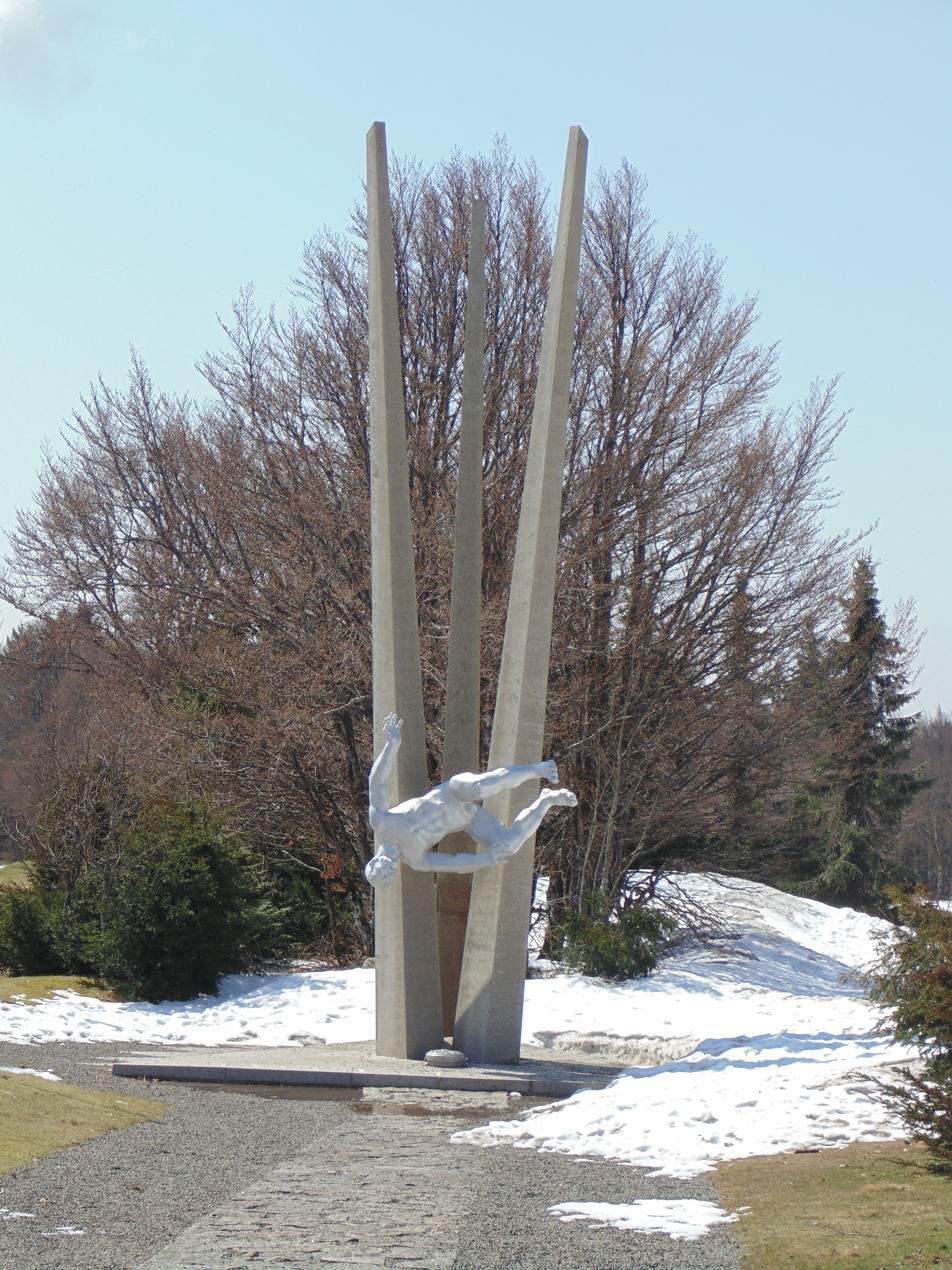
Deminers monument at Ballon d'Alsace

== See also ==
- Col du Ballon d'Alsace
- Souvenir Henri Desgrange
