= Eptingen =

- Municipality
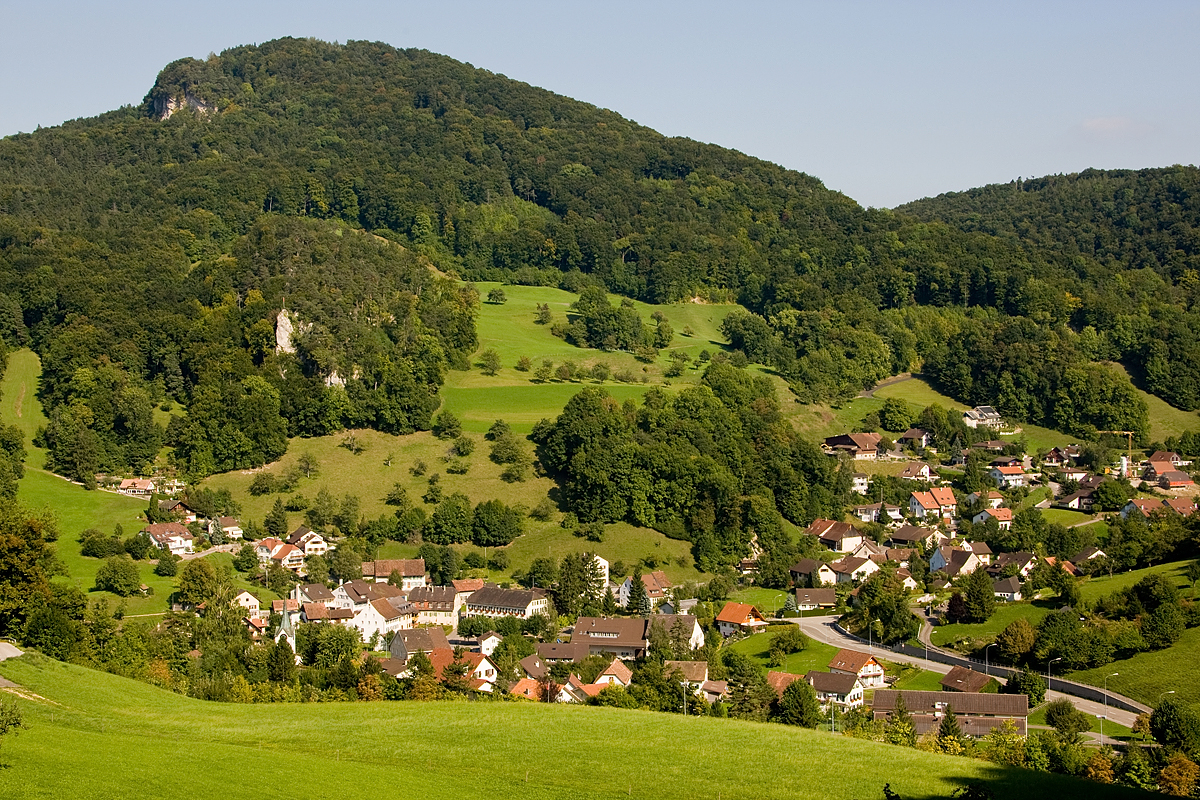

- Coat of arms
- Location of Eptingen
- Location within Switzerland Location within Canton of Basel-Landschaft
- Coordinates: 47°23′N 7°49′E
- Country: Switzerland
- Canton: Basel-Landschaft
- District: Waldenburg

Area
  - Total: 11.19 km^{2} (4.32 sq mi)
- Elevation: 568 m (1,864 ft)

Population (June 2021)
  - Total: 544
  - Density: 48.6/km^{2} (126/sq mi)
- Time zone: UTC+01:00 (CET)
  - Summer (DST): UTC+02:00 (CEST)
- Postal code: 4458
- SFOS number: 2885
- ISO 3166 code: CH-BL
- Surrounded by: Bennwil, Diegten, Hägendorf (SO), Hauenstein-Ifenthal (SO), Langenbruck, Läufelfingen
- Website: www.eptingen.ch

Eptingen is a municipality in the district of Waldenburg in the canton of Basel-Country in Switzerland.

== History ==
Eptingen is first mentioned in 1145 as Ebittingen.

== Castle Ruins Around Eptingen ==
The Burgruine Witwald, also called Wild-Eptingen or younger castle, are the ruins of a hilltop castle above the settlement of Eptingen in the Swiss canton of Basel-Landschaft . You can see remains of the walls of the Palas as well as an entrance gate, a staircase and a cistern . About 300 meters southeast are the older ruins of Wild-Eptingen, probably a predecessor of Witwald Castle.

== Coat of arms ==
The blazon of the municipal coat of arms is Or, an Eagle displayed fesswise Sable beaked and membered Gules.

== Geography ==
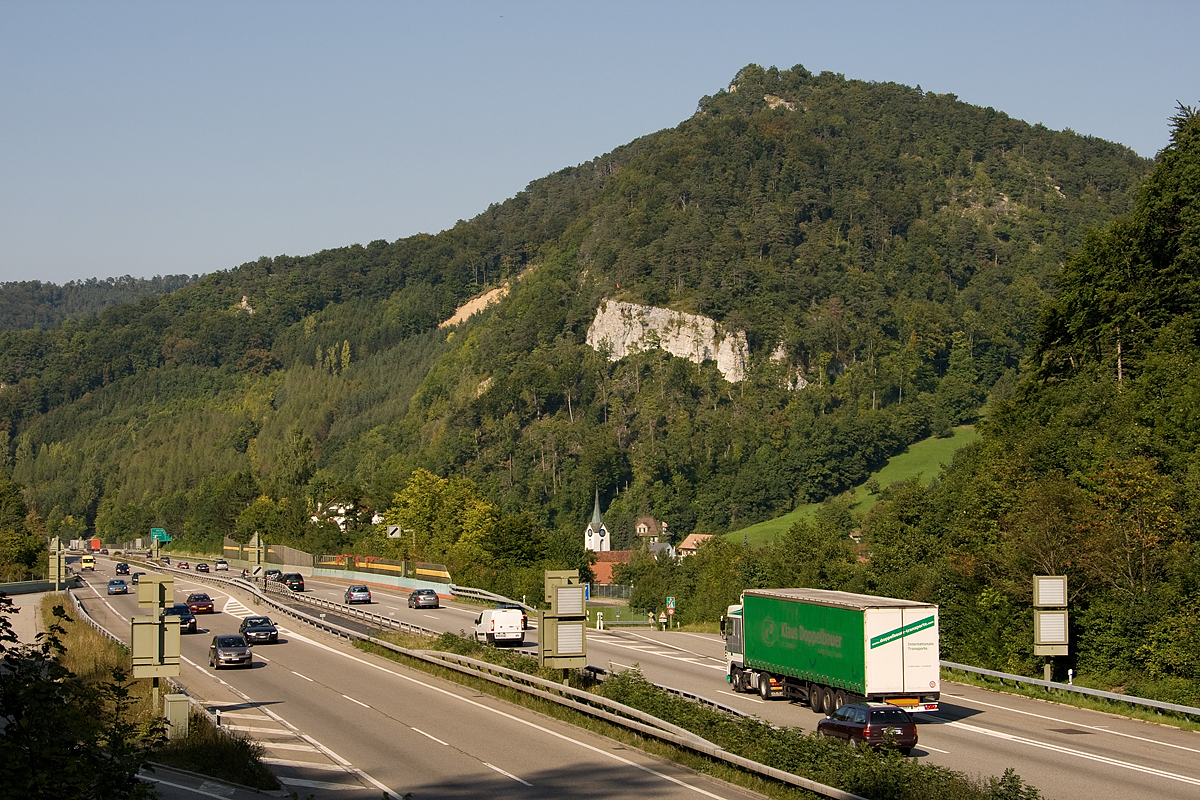
Highway at Eptingen

Aerial view from 3000 m by Walter Mittelholzer (1923)

Eptingen has an area, as of 2009, of 11.19 square kilometers (4.32 sq mi). Of this area, 5.29 km^{2} (2.04 sq mi) or 47.3% is used for agricultural purposes, while 5.33 km^{2} (2.06 sq mi) or 47.6% is forested. Of the rest of the land, 0.58 km^{2} (0.22 sq mi) or 5.2% is settled (buildings or roads), 0.01 km^{2} (2.5 acres) or 0.1% is either rivers or lakes and 0.03 km^{2} (7.4 acres) or 0.3% is unproductive land.

Of the built up area, housing and buildings made up 2.0% and transportation infrastructure made up 2.2%. Out of the forested land, 46.0% of the total land area is heavily forested and 1.6% is covered with orchards or small clusters of trees. Of the agricultural land, 7.9% is used for growing crops and 34.5% is pastures, while 2.1% is used for orchards or vine crops and 2.9% is used for alpine pastures. All the water in the municipality is flowing water.

The municipality is located in the Waldenburg district, at the foot of Belchen mountain in the Diegter valley.

== Demographics ==
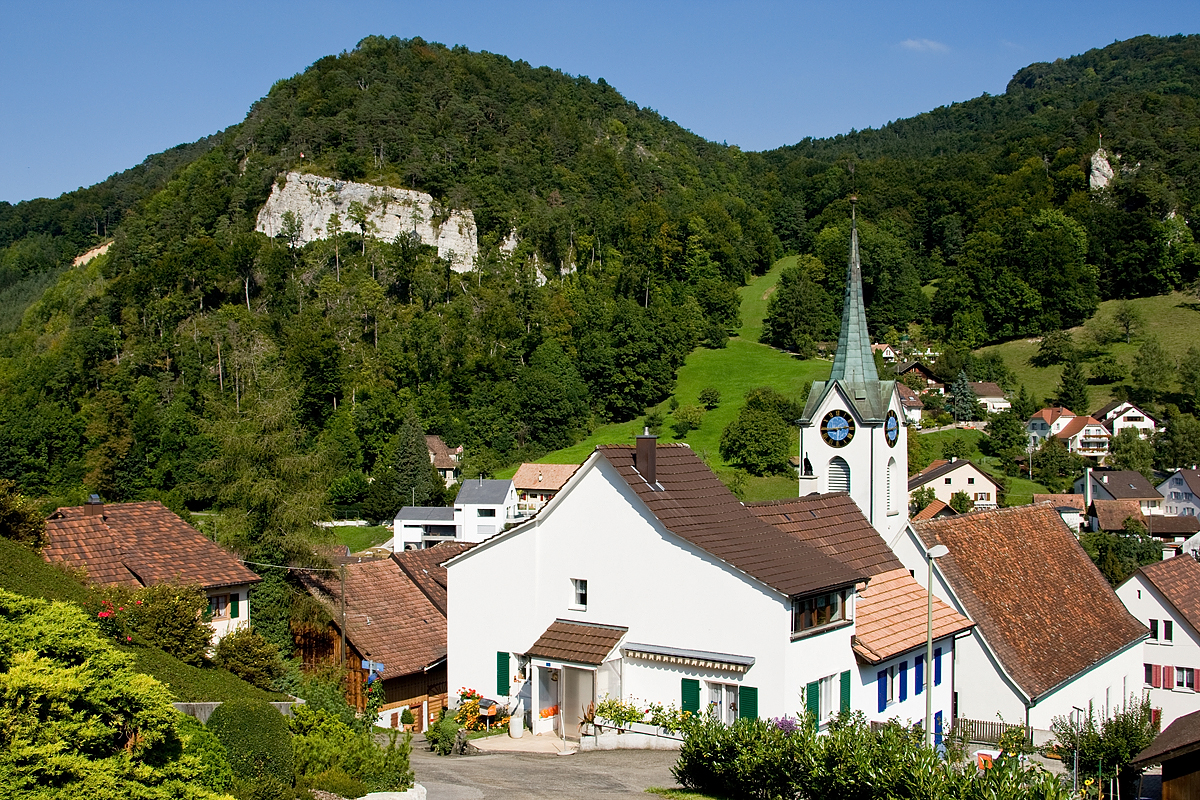
Village and Church of Eptingen

Eptingen has a population (as of June 2021) of 544. As of 2008, 4.5% of the population are resident foreign nationals. Over the last 10 years (1997–2007) the population has changed at a rate of -4.9%.

Most of the population (as of 2000) speaks German (551 or 97.3%), with Serbo-Croatian being second most common (6 or 1.1%) and Albanian being third (4 or 0.7%). There is 1 person who speaks French.

As of 2008, the gender distribution of the population was 53.7% male and 46.3% female. The population was made up of 491 Swiss citizens (93.2% of the population), and 36 non-Swiss residents (6.8%) Of the population in the municipality 234 or about 41.3% were born in Eptingen and lived there in 2000. There were 139 or 24.6% who were born in the same canton, while 134 or 23.7% were born somewhere else in Switzerland, and 56 or 9.9% were born outside of Switzerland.

In 2008 there were 3 live births to Swiss citizens and were 5 deaths of Swiss citizens. Ignoring immigration and emigration, the population of Swiss citizens decreased by 2 while the foreign population remained the same. There was 1 Swiss man who immigrated back to Switzerland. The total Swiss population change in 2008 (from all sources, including moves across municipal borders) was a decrease of 16 and the non-Swiss population decreased by 4 people. This represents a population growth rate of -3.7%.

The age distribution, as of 2010, in Eptingen is; 31 children or 5.9% of the population are between 0 and 6 years old and 66 teenagers or 12.5% are between 7 and 19. Of the adult population, 66 people or 12.5% of the population are between 20 and 29 years old. 73 people or 13.9% are between 30 and 39, 82 people or 15.6% are between 40 and 49, and 114 people or 21.6% are between 50 and 64. The senior population distribution is 73 people or 13.9% of the population are between 65 and 79 years old and there are 22 people or 4.2% who are over 80.

As of 2000, there were 236 people who were single and never married in the municipality. There were 260 married individuals, 41 widows or widowers and 29 individuals who are divorced.

As of 2000, there were 225 private households in the municipality, and an average of 2.5 persons per household. There were 70 households that consist of only one person and 21 households with five or more people. Out of a total of 231 households that answered this question, 30.3% were households made up of just one person and 1 were adults who lived with their parents. Of the rest of the households, there are 59 married couples without children, 82 married couples with children There were 11 single parents with a child or children. There were 2 households that were made up unrelated people and 6 households that were made some sort of institution or another collective housing.

In 2000 there were 82 single family homes (or 51.3% of the total) out of a total of 160 inhabited buildings. There were 21 multi-family buildings (13.1%), along with 47 multi-purpose buildings that were mostly used for housing (29.4%) and 10 other use buildings (commercial or industrial) that also had some housing (6.3%). Of the single family homes 27 were built before 1919, while 8 were built between 1990 and 2000.

In 2000 there were 233 apartments in the municipality. The most common apartment size was 4 rooms of which there were 76. There were 1 single room apartments and 97 apartments with five or more rooms. Of these apartments, a total of 217 apartments (93.1% of the total) were permanently occupied, while 13 apartments (5.6%) were seasonally occupied and 3 apartments (1.3%) were empty. As of 2009, the construction rate of new housing units was 1.9 new units per 1000 residents. As of 2000 the average price to rent a three-room apartment was about 933.00 CHF (US$750, £420, €600) and a four-room apartment cost an average of 1185.00 CHF (US$950, £530, €760). The vacancy rate for the municipality, in 2010, was 0.4%.

The historical population is given in the following chart:

== Politics ==
In the 2007 federal election the most popular party was the SVP which received 50% of the vote. The next three most popular parties were the SP (17.19%), the Green Party (13.69%) and the FDP (10.34%). In the federal election, a total of 201 votes were cast, and the voter turnout was 48.3%.

== Economy ==
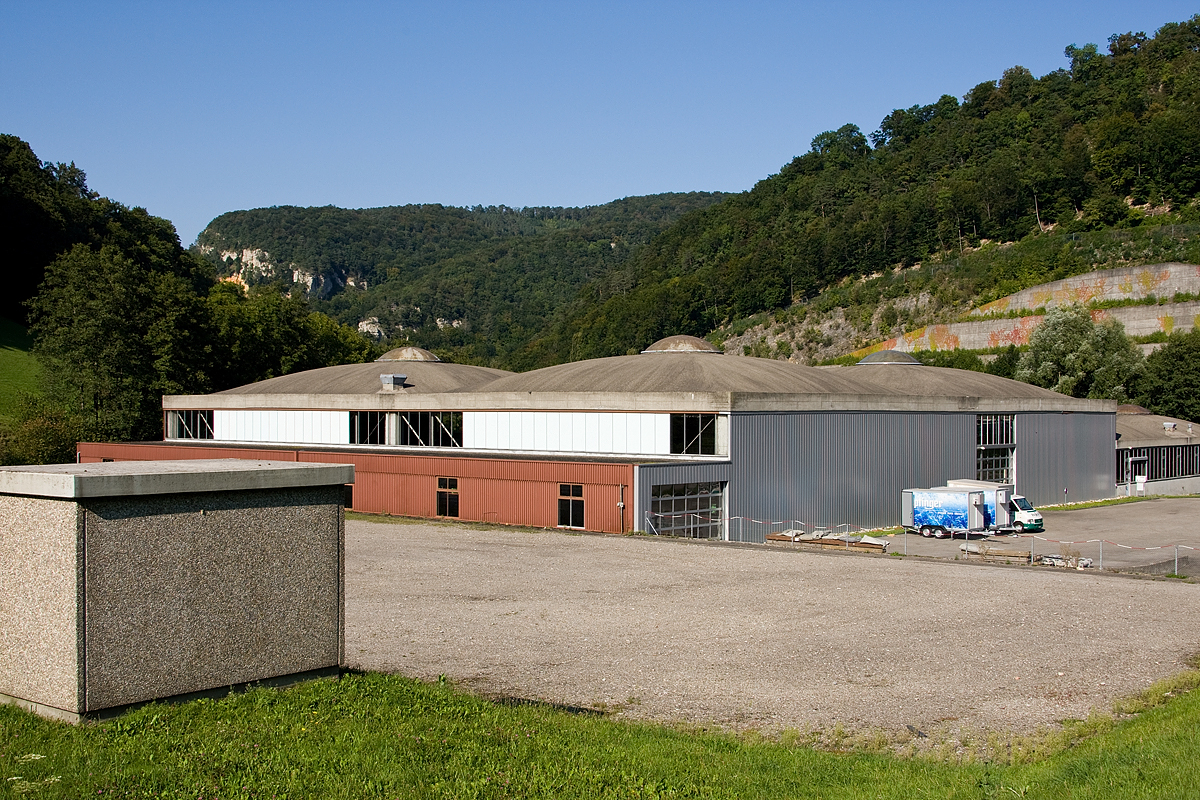
Eptinger mineral water plant

As of 2010, Eptingen had an unemployment rate of 2.2%. As of 2008, there were 76 people employed in the primary economic sector and about 28 businesses involved in this sector. 40 people were employed in the secondary sector and there were 10 businesses in this sector. 174 people were employed in the tertiary sector, with 16 businesses in this sector. There were 292 residents of the municipality who were employed in some capacity, of which females made up 37.7% of the workforce.

In 2008 the total number of full-time equivalent jobs was 230. The number of jobs in the primary sector was 47, of which 46 were in agriculture and 1 was in forestry or lumber production. The number of jobs in the secondary sector was 38 of which 31 or (81.6%) were in manufacturing and 6 (15.8%) were in construction. The number of jobs in the tertiary sector was 145. In the tertiary sector; 46 or 31.7% were in wholesale or retail sales or the repair of motor vehicles, 63 or 43.4% were in the movement and storage of goods, 24 or 16.6% were in a hotel or restaurant, 4 or 2.8% were technical professionals or scientists, 2 or 1.4% were in education.

In 2000, there were 190 workers who commuted into the municipality and 175 workers who commuted away. The municipality is a net importer of workers, with about 1.1 workers entering the municipality for every one leaving. About 8.9% of the workforce coming into Eptingen are coming from outside Switzerland. Of the working population, 13.4% used public transportation to get to work, and 51.7% used a private car.

It is known for its mineral water brand Eptinger.

== Religion ==
From the 2000 census, 89 or 15.7% were Roman Catholic, while 376 or 66.4% belonged to the Swiss Reformed Church. Of the rest of the population, there were 4 members of an Orthodox church (or about 0.71% of the population), and there were 3 individuals (or about 0.53% of the population) who belonged to another Christian church. There were 36 (or about 6.36% of the population) who were Islamic. 52 (or about 9.19% of the population) belonged to no church, are agnostic or atheist, and 6 individuals (or about 1.06% of the population) did not answer the question.

== Weather ==
Eptingen has an average of 147.1 days of rain or snow per year and on average receives 1,148 mm (45.2 in) of precipitation. The wettest month is June during which time Eptingen receives an average of 120 mm (4.7 in) of rain or snow. During this month there is precipitation for an average of 13.2 days. The month with the most days of precipitation is May, with an average of 14.5, but with only 109 mm (4.3 in) of rain or snow. The driest month of the year is October with an average of 76 mm (3.0 in) of precipitation over 9.5 days.

== Education ==
In Eptingen about 214 or (37.8%) of the population have completed non-mandatory upper secondary education, and 57 or (10.1%) have completed additional higher education (either university or a Fachhochschule). Of the 57 who completed tertiary schooling, 64.9% were Swiss men, 29.8% were Swiss women.

As of 2000, there were 2 students in Eptingen who came from another municipality, while 57 residents attended schools outside the municipality.
