= Trin railway station =

Railway station in Switzerland

Trin
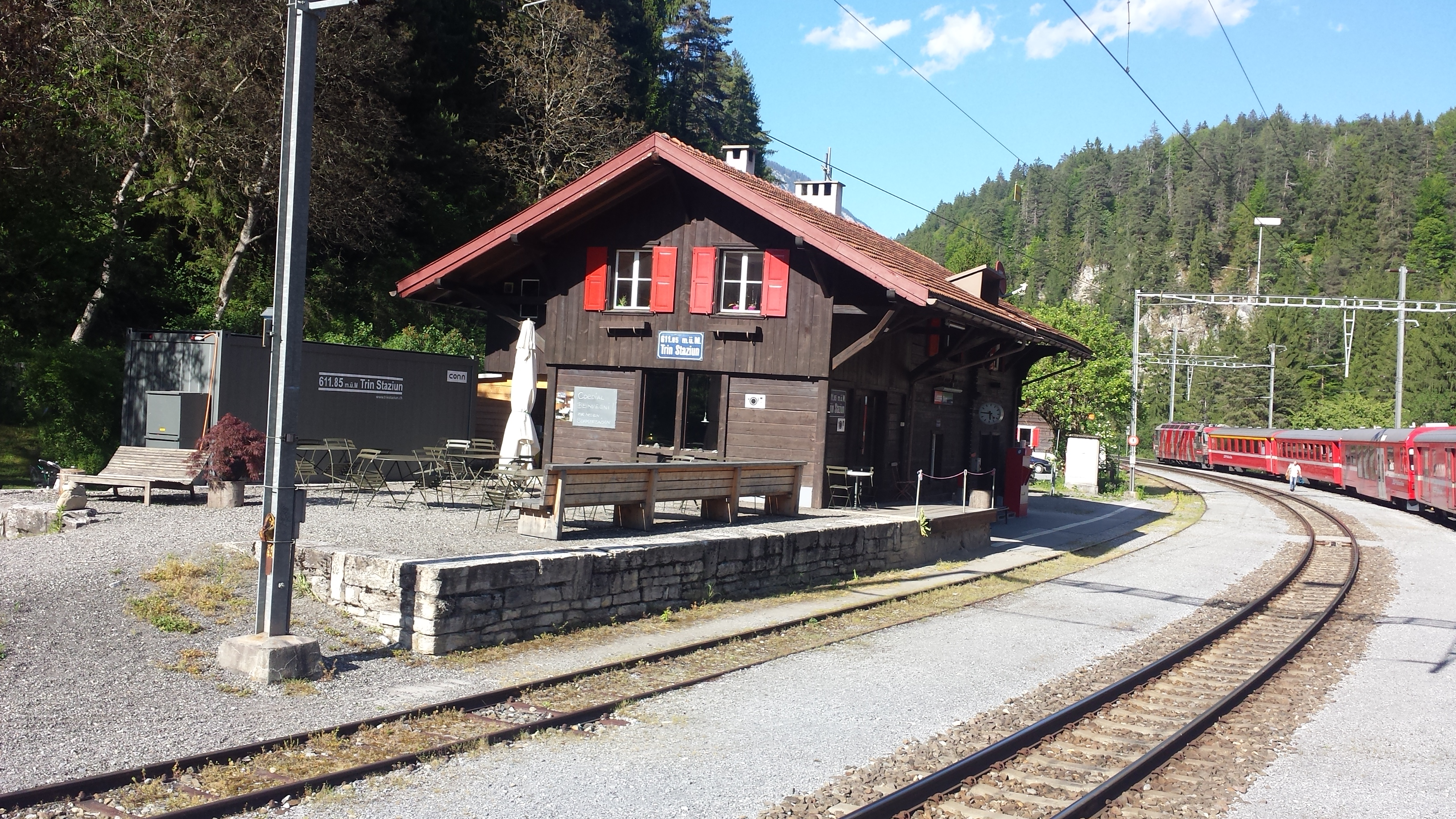
- The station in 2017

General information
- Location: Staziun 950; Trin; Switzerland
- Coordinates: 46°49′00″N 9°21′34″E
- Elevation: 608 m (1,995 ft)
- Owner: Rhaetian Railway
- Line: Reichenau-Tamins–Disentis/Mustér line
- Distance: 26.3 km (16.3 mi) from Landquart
- Train operators: Rhaetian Railway

History
- Opened: 1 June 1903
- Electrified: 22 May 1922

Passengers
- 2018: 70 per weekday

Services
Preceding station	Rhaetian Railway	Following station
Valendas-Sagogn towards Ilanz	RE 5	Chur Terminus
Versam-Safien towards Disentis/Mustér	RE 7 Limited service	Reichenau-Tamins towards Chur
Location

Trin railway station is a station on the Reichenau-Tamins–Disentis/Mustér of the Rhaetian Railway in the Swiss canton of Graubünden. It is situated alongside the Anterior Rhine, in the railway's scenic passage through the Ruinaulta or Rhine Gorge. The station is located on the north bank of the river in the municipality of Trin, although the village of Trin lies about 3 kilometres (1.9 mi) to the north and some 250 metres (820 ft) higher than the station.

== Services ==
As of the December 2025 timetable change, the following services stop at Trin:

- RegioExpress: hourly service between Ilanz and Chur and limited direct service to Disentis/Mustér.

== Gallery ==
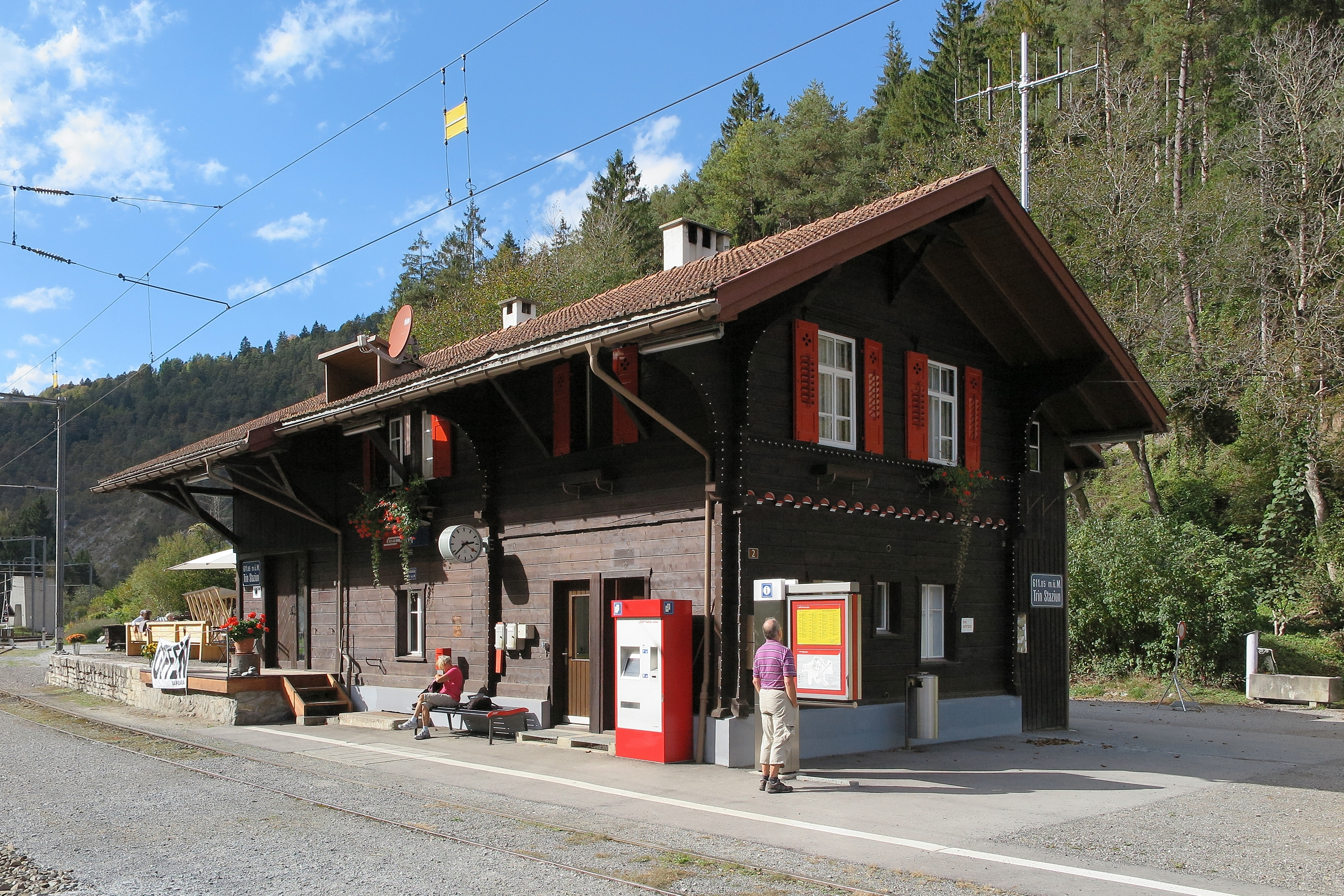
The station building

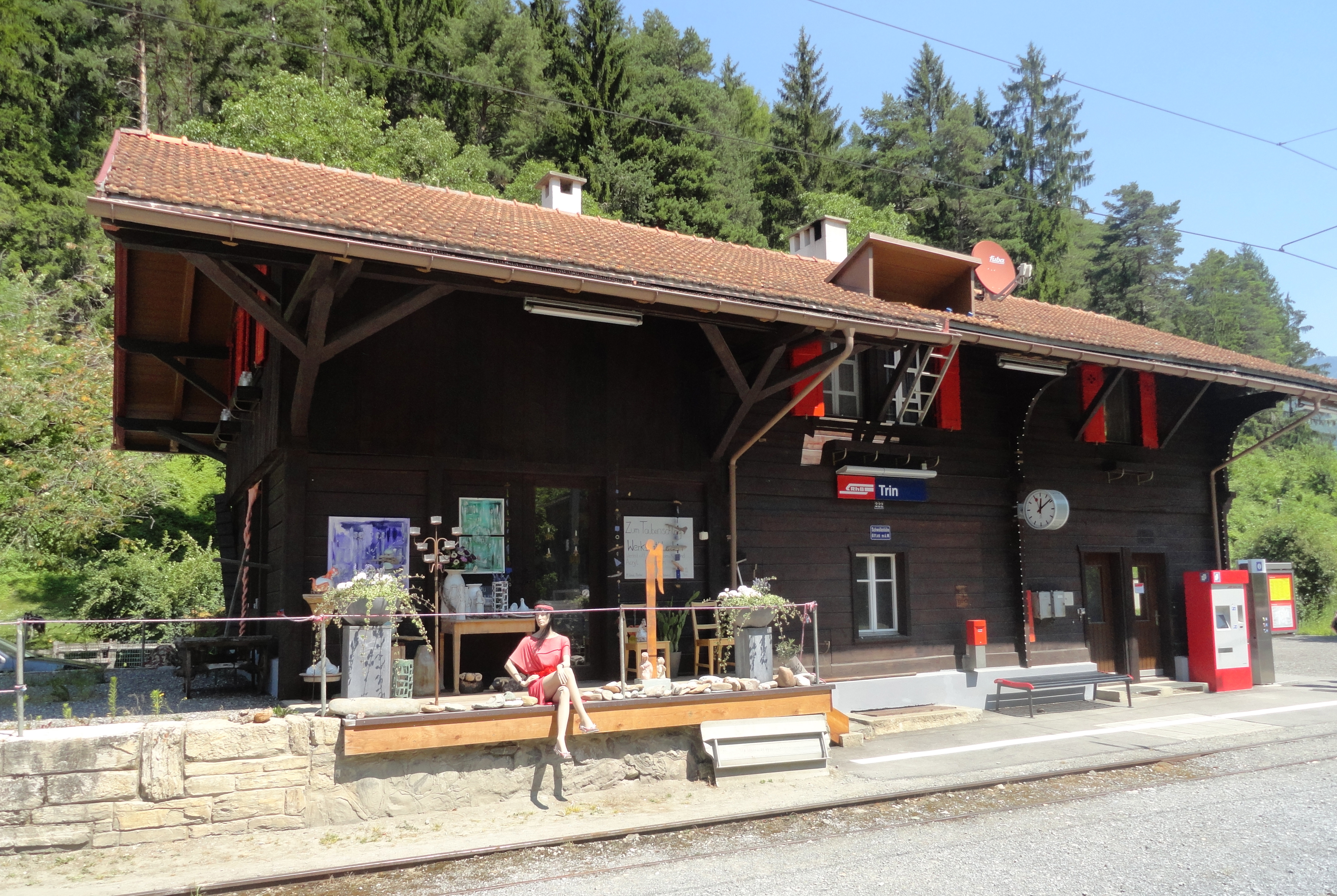
Activity at the station

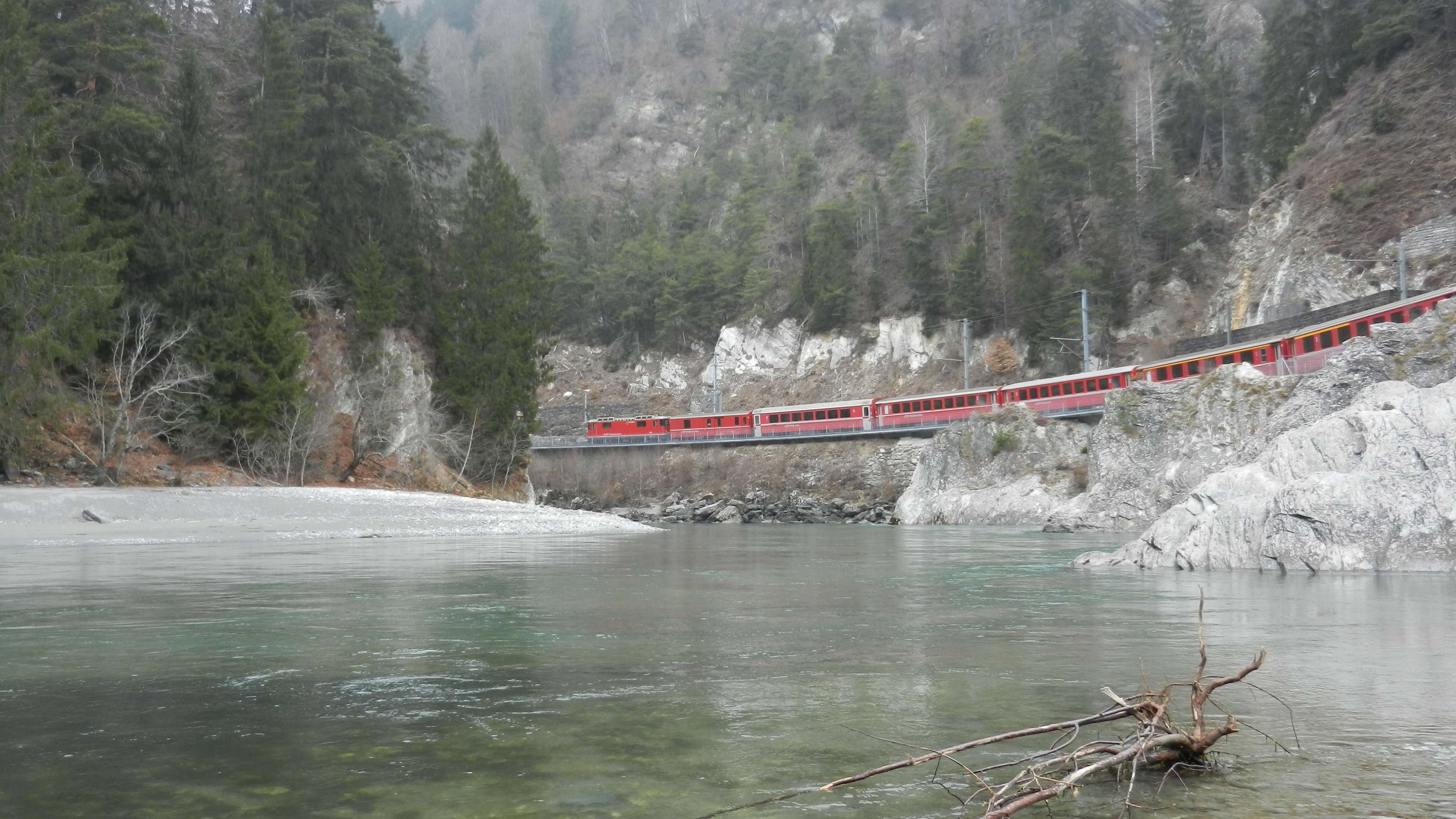
Train passing through the Ruinaulta
