= Trun railway station =

Railway station in Switzerland

Trun
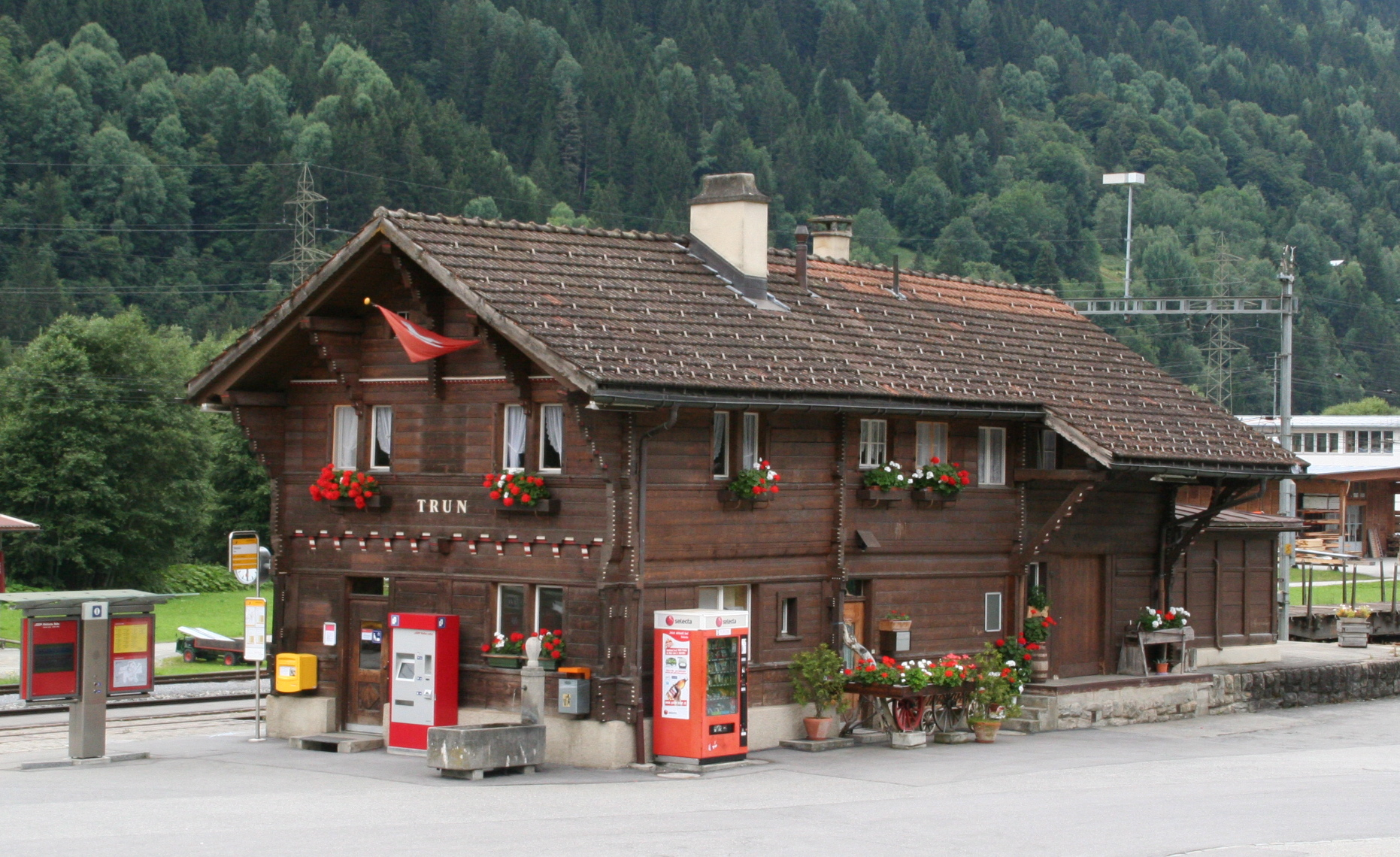
- The station building in 2011

General information
- Location: Via Principala; Trun; Switzerland
- Coordinates: 46°44′33″N 8°59′26″E
- Elevation: 852 m (2,795 ft)
- Owner: Rhaetian Railway
- Line: Reichenau-Tamins–Disentis/Mustér line
- Distance: 60.8 km (37.8 mi) from Landquart
- Train operators: Rhaetian Railway
- Connections: PostAuto Schweiz buses

Construction
- Architect: Meinrad Lorenz (1912)

History
- Opened: 1 August 1912
- Electrified: 22 May 1922

Passengers
- 2018: 350 per weekday

Services
Preceding station	Rhaetian Railway	Following station
Rabius-Surrein towards Disentis/Mustér	RE 7	Tavanasa-Breil/Brigels towards Chur
Location

Trun railway station (German: Bahnhof Trun) is a railway station in the municipality of Trun, in the Swiss canton of Graubünden. It is an intermediate stop on the 1,000 mm (3 ft 3 3/8 in) gauge Reichenau-Tamins–Disentis/Mustér line of the Rhaetian Railway.

== Services ==
As of the December 2023 timetable change, the following services stop at Trun:

- RegioExpress: hourly service between Disentis/Mustér and Chur.
