= Waltensburg/Vuorz railway station =

Railway station in Switzerland

Waltensburg/Vuorz
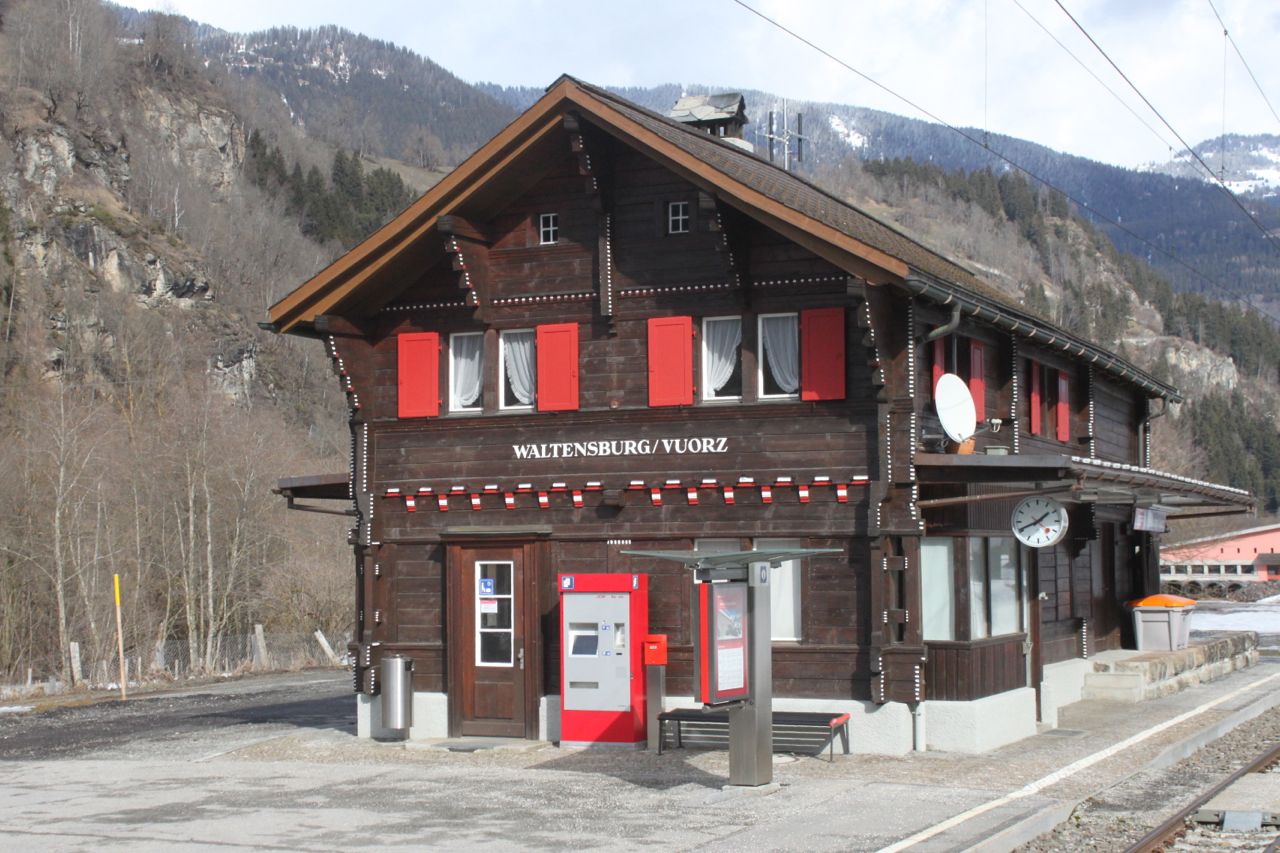
- The station building in 2014

General information
- Location: Breil/Brigels; Switzerland
- Coordinates: 46°46′10″N 9°07′13″E
- Elevation: 744 m (2,441 ft)
- Owner: Rhaetian Railway
- Line: Reichenau-Tamins–Disentis/Mustér line
- Distance: 50.1 km (31.1 mi) from Landquart
- Train operators: Rhaetian Railway

History
- Opened: 1 August 1912
- Electrified: 22 May 1922

Passengers
- 2018: 50 per weekday

Services
Preceding station	Rhaetian Railway	Following station
Tavanasa-Breil/Brigels towards Disentis/Mustér	RE 7	Rueun towards Chur
Location

Waltensburg/Vuorz railway station is a station on the Reichenau-Tamins–Disentis/Mustér railway of the Rhaetian Railway in the Swiss canton of Graubünden. It serves the village of Waltensburg/Vuorz in the municipality of Breil/Brigels.

== Services ==
As of the December 2023 timetable change, the following services stop at Waltensburg/Vuorz:

- RegioExpress: hourly service between Disentis/Mustér and Chur.
