= Rueun railway station =

Railway station in Switzerland

Rueun
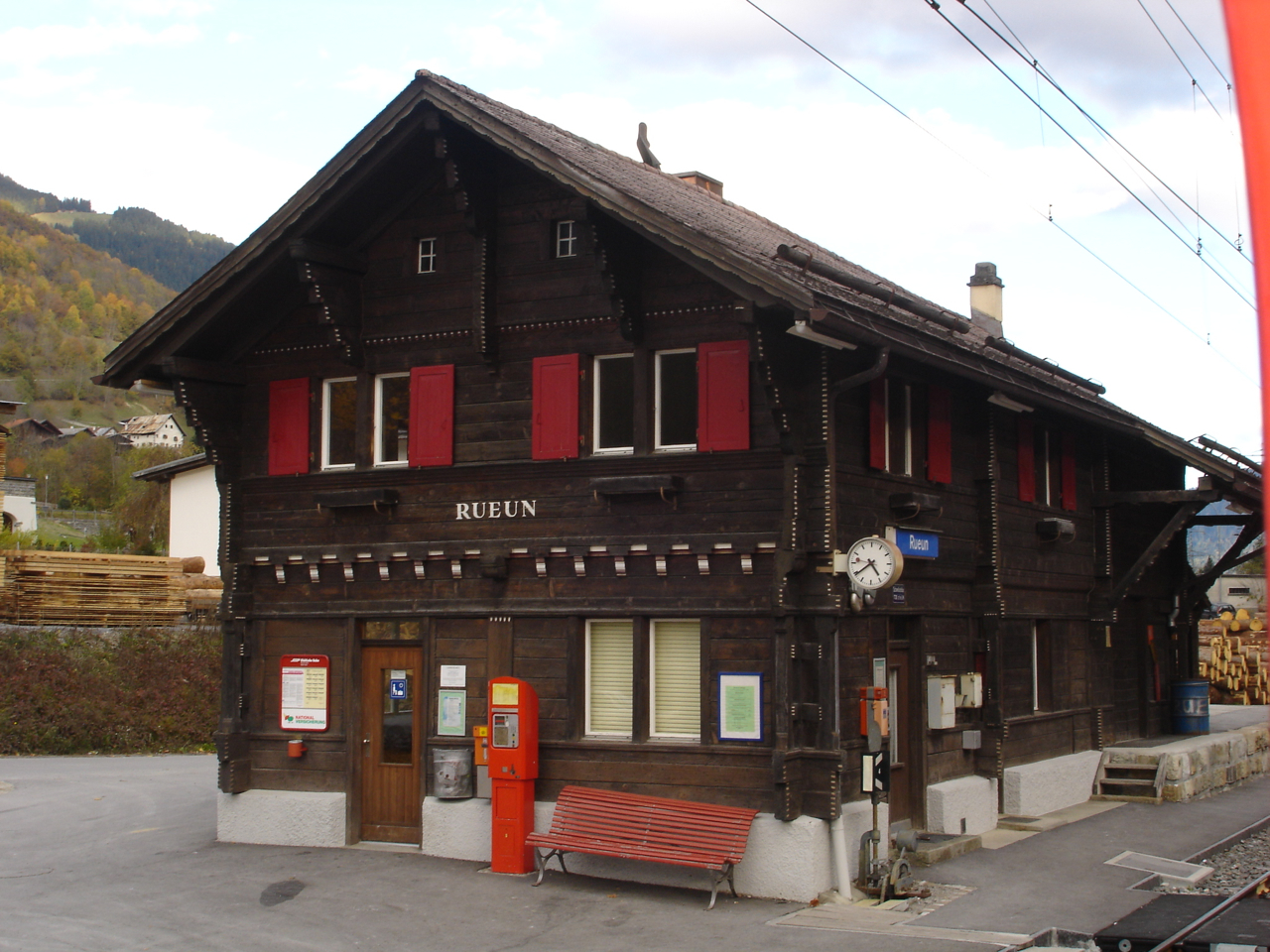
- The station building in 2005

General information
- Location: San Clau; Ilanz/Glion; Switzerland
- Coordinates: 46°46′29″N 9°08′44″E
- Elevation: 732 m (2,402 ft)
- Owner: Rhaetian Railway
- Line: Reichenau-Tamins–Disentis/Mustér line
- Distance: 48.0 km (29.8 mi) from Landquart
- Train operators: Rhaetian Railway

History
- Opened: 1 August 1912
- Electrified: 22 May 1922

Passengers
- 2018: 70 per weekday

Services
| Preceding station | Rhaetian Railway | Following station |
|---|---|---|
| Waltensburg/Vuorz towards Disentis/Mustér | RE 7 | Ilanz towards Chur |
Location

Rueun railway station is a station on the Reichenau-Tamins–Disentis/Mustér railway of the Rhaetian Railway in the Swiss canton of Graubünden. It serves the village of Rueun, in the municipality of Ilanz/Glion.

== Services ==
As of the December 2023 timetable change, the following services stop at Rueun:

- RegioExpress: hourly service between Disentis/Mustér and Chur.
