= Versam-Safien railway station =

Railway station in Switzerland

Versam-Safien
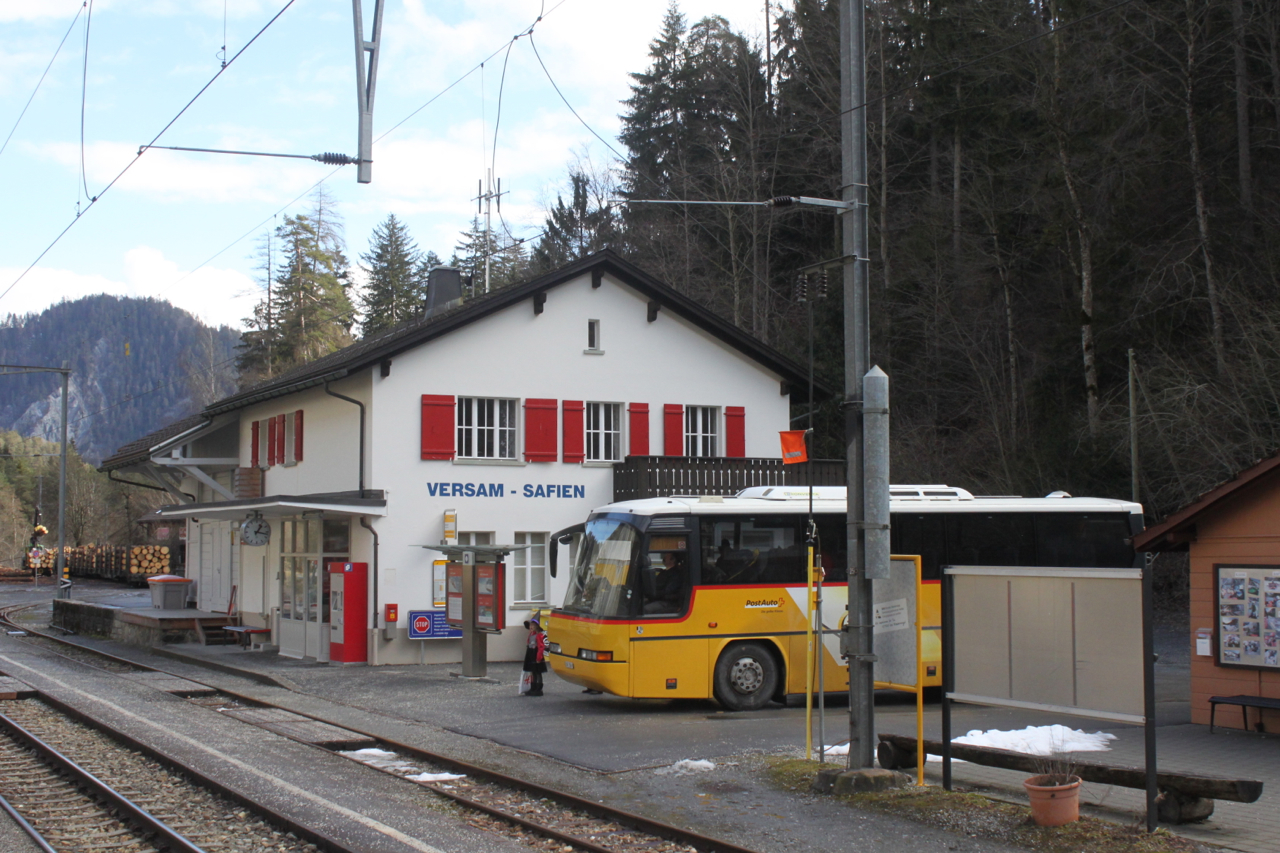
- The station building and connecting bus in 2014

General information
- Location: Station 263; Versam; Switzerland
- Coordinates: 46°48′27″N 9°18′37″E
- Elevation: 635 m (2,083 ft)
- Owner: Rhaetian Railway
- Line: Reichenau-Tamins–Disentis/Mustér line
- Distance: 32.7 km (20.3 mi) from Landquart
- Train operators: Rhaetian Railway
- Connections: PostAuto Schweiz buses

History
- Opened: 1 June 1903
- Electrified: 22 May 1922

Passengers
- 2018: 190 per weekday

Services
Preceding station	Rhaetian Railway	Following station
Valendas-Sagogn towards Disentis/Mustér	RE 7	Trin towards Chur
Location

Versam-Safien railway station is a station on the Reichenau-Tamins–Disentis/Mustér railway of the Rhaetian Railway in the Swiss canton of Graubünden. It is situated alongside the Anterior Rhine, in the railway's scenic passage through the Ruinaulta or Rhine Gorge. The station is located on the south bank of the river in the municipality of Safiental, and serves the village of Versam that lies some 3.6 km (2.2 mi) to the south and some 250 metres (820 ft) higher than the station.

== Services ==
As of the December 2023 timetable change, the following services stop at Versam-Safien:

- RegioExpress: hourly service between Disentis/Mustér and Chur.
- PostAuto: bus service to Ilanz and Tenna-Thalkirch-Turahus.

== Water sports ==
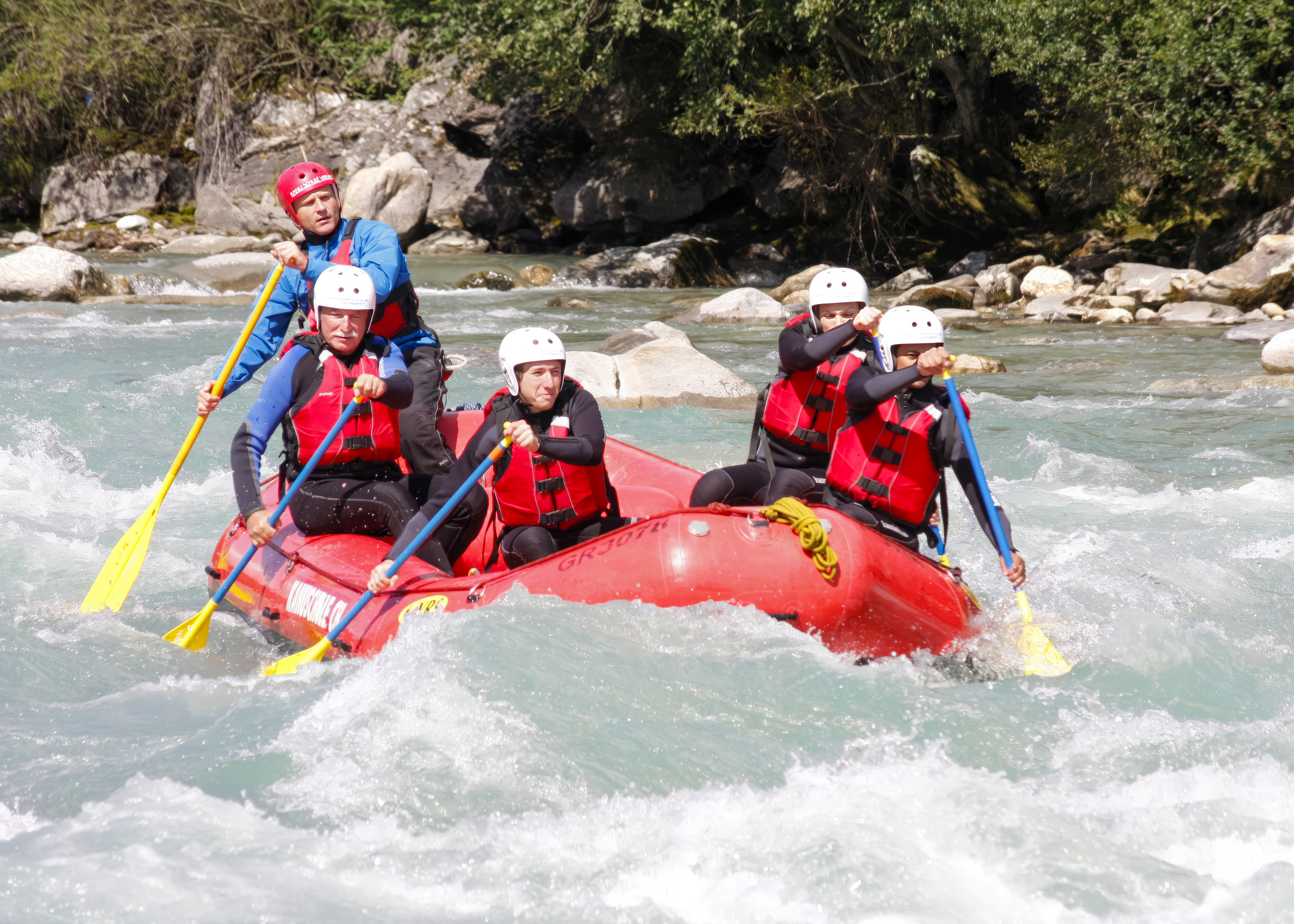
Rafting from Ilanz to Versam-Safien

At Versam-Safien there is a rafting and kayaking tour operator. Since the railway travels along the Vorderrhein river, it can be used to easily take rafters and kayakers back to the starting point.

== Gallery ==
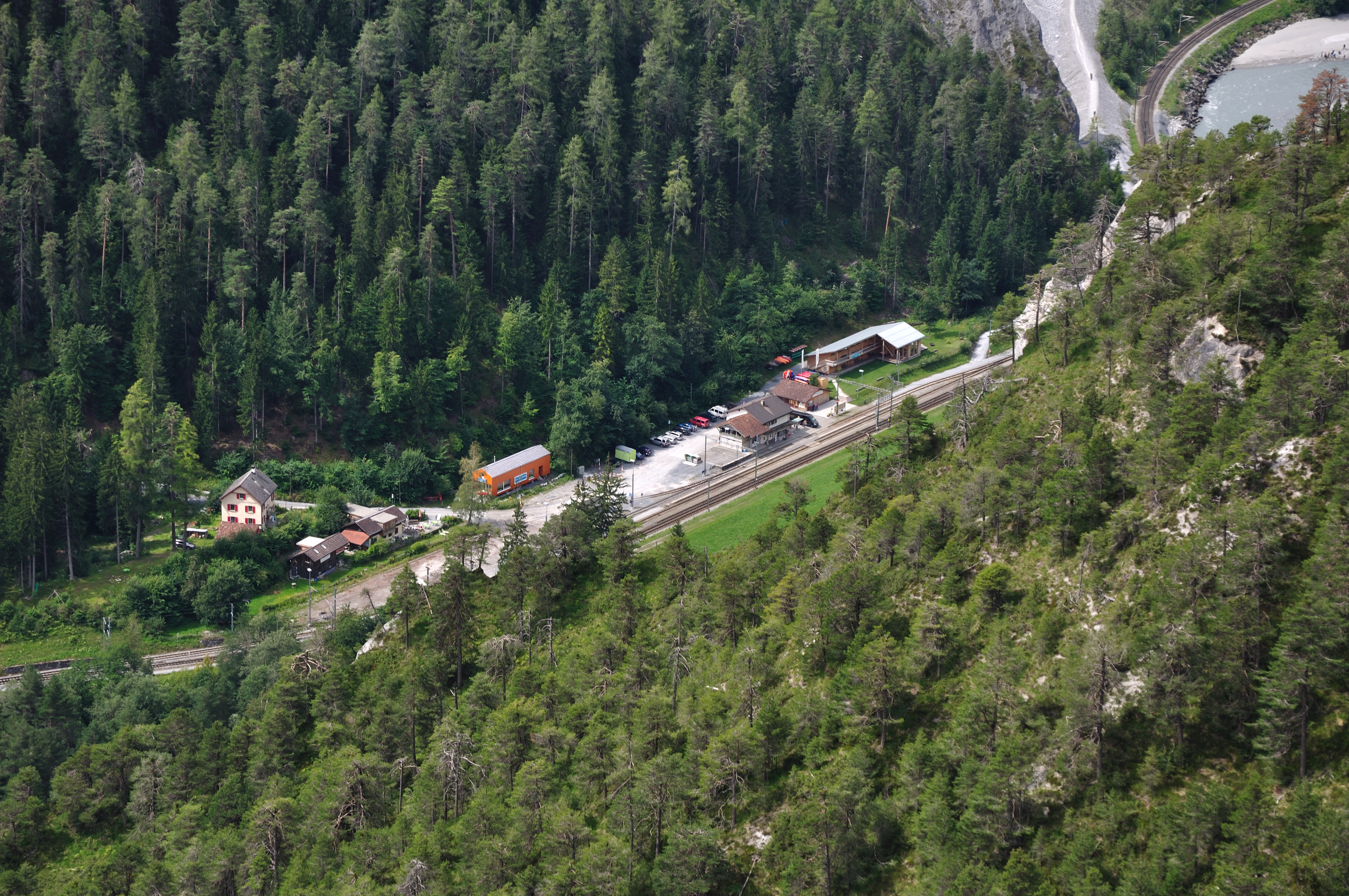
Station from above

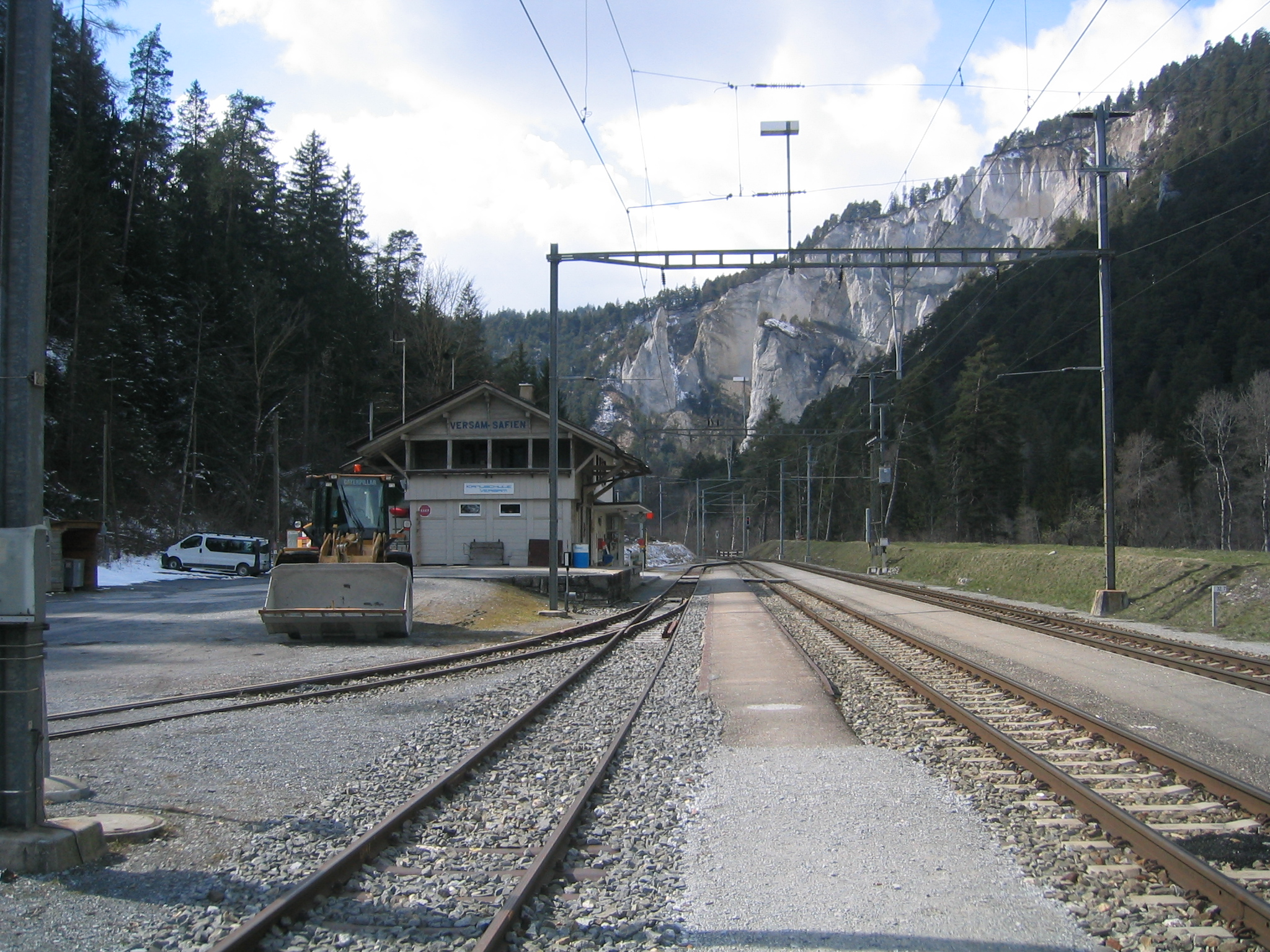
Station platforms

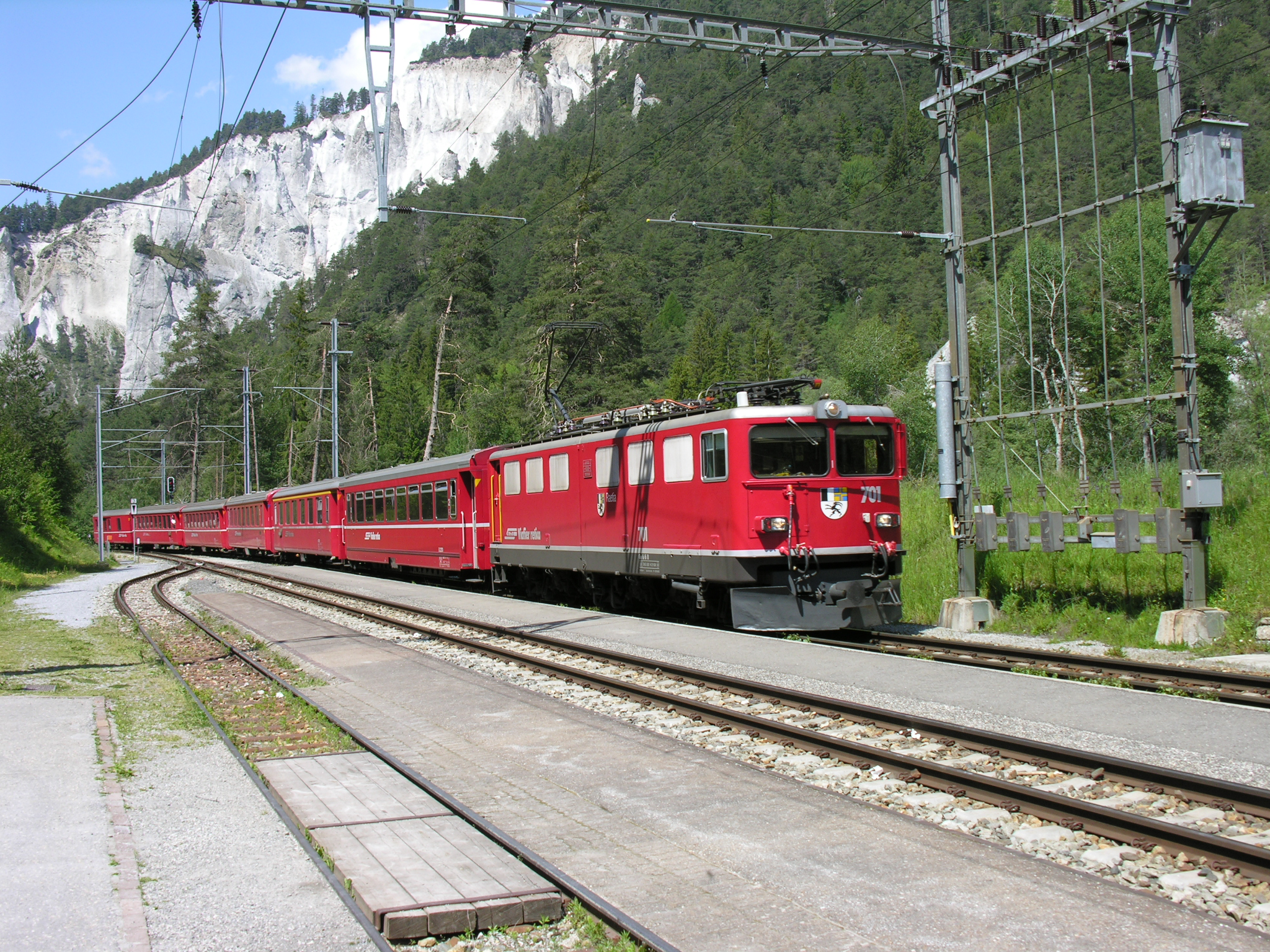
Train passing through

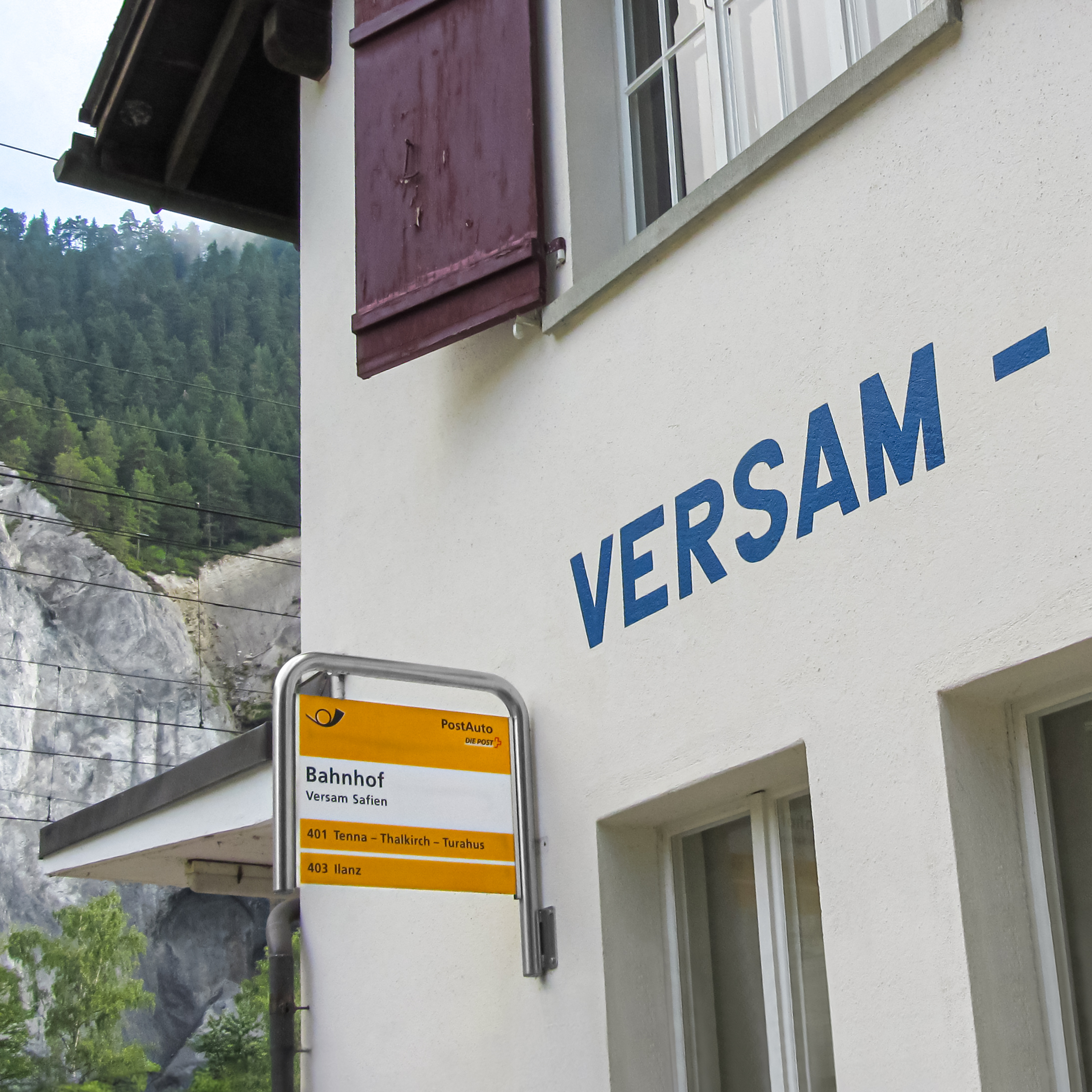
PostAuto routes

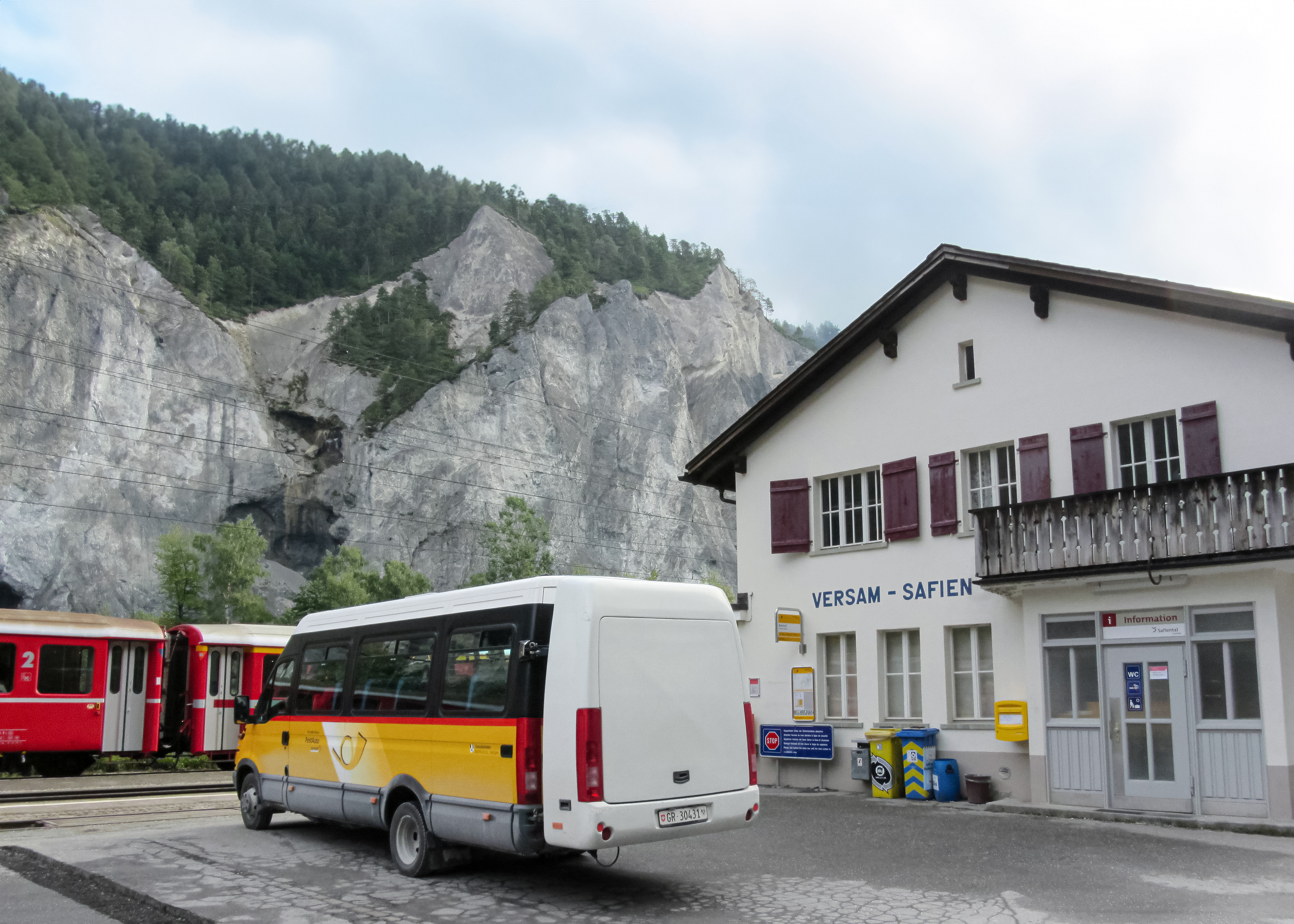
PostAuto waiting for passengers

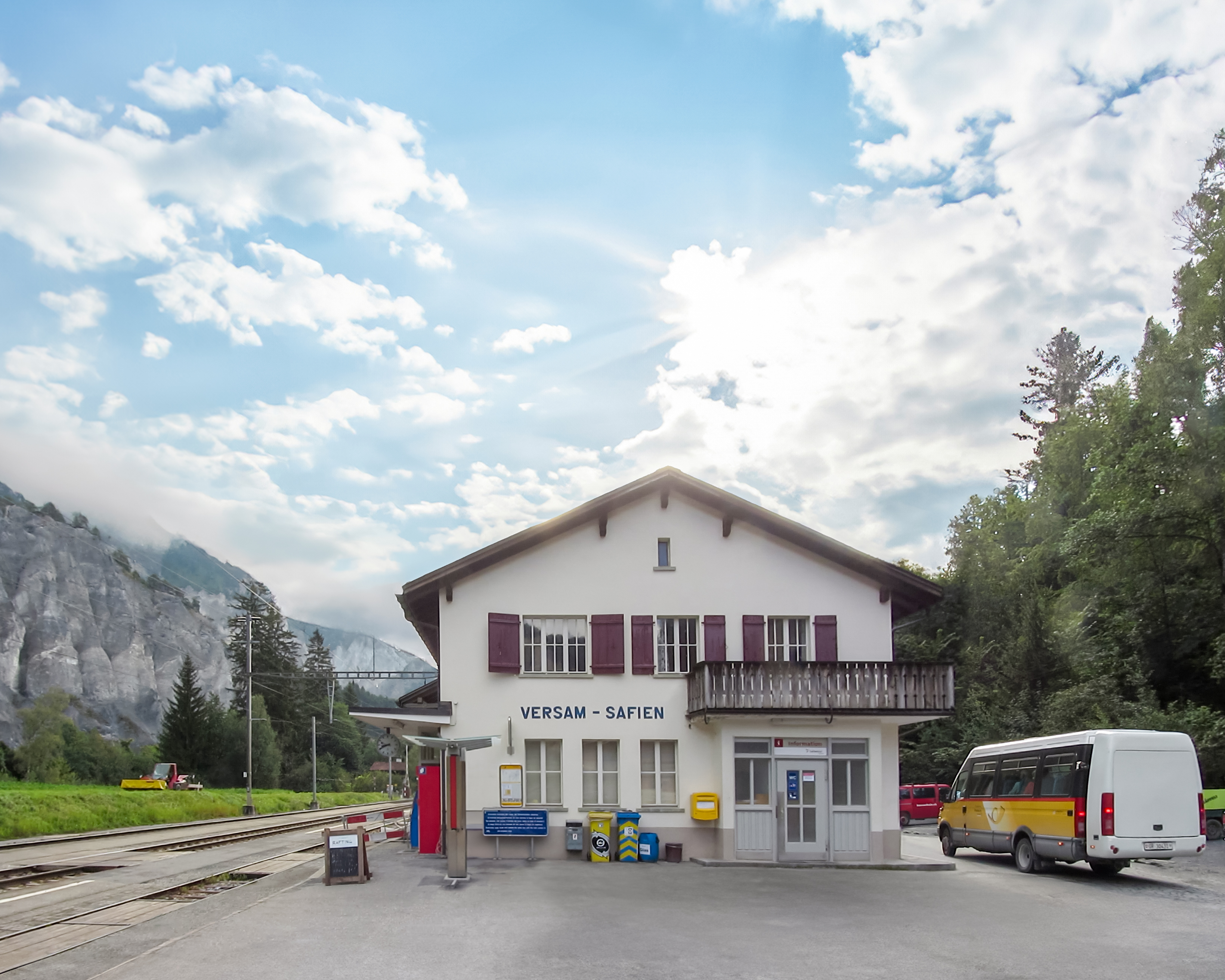
PostAuto departing from the station
