= Valendas-Sagogn railway station =

Railway station in Switzerland

Valendas-Sagogn
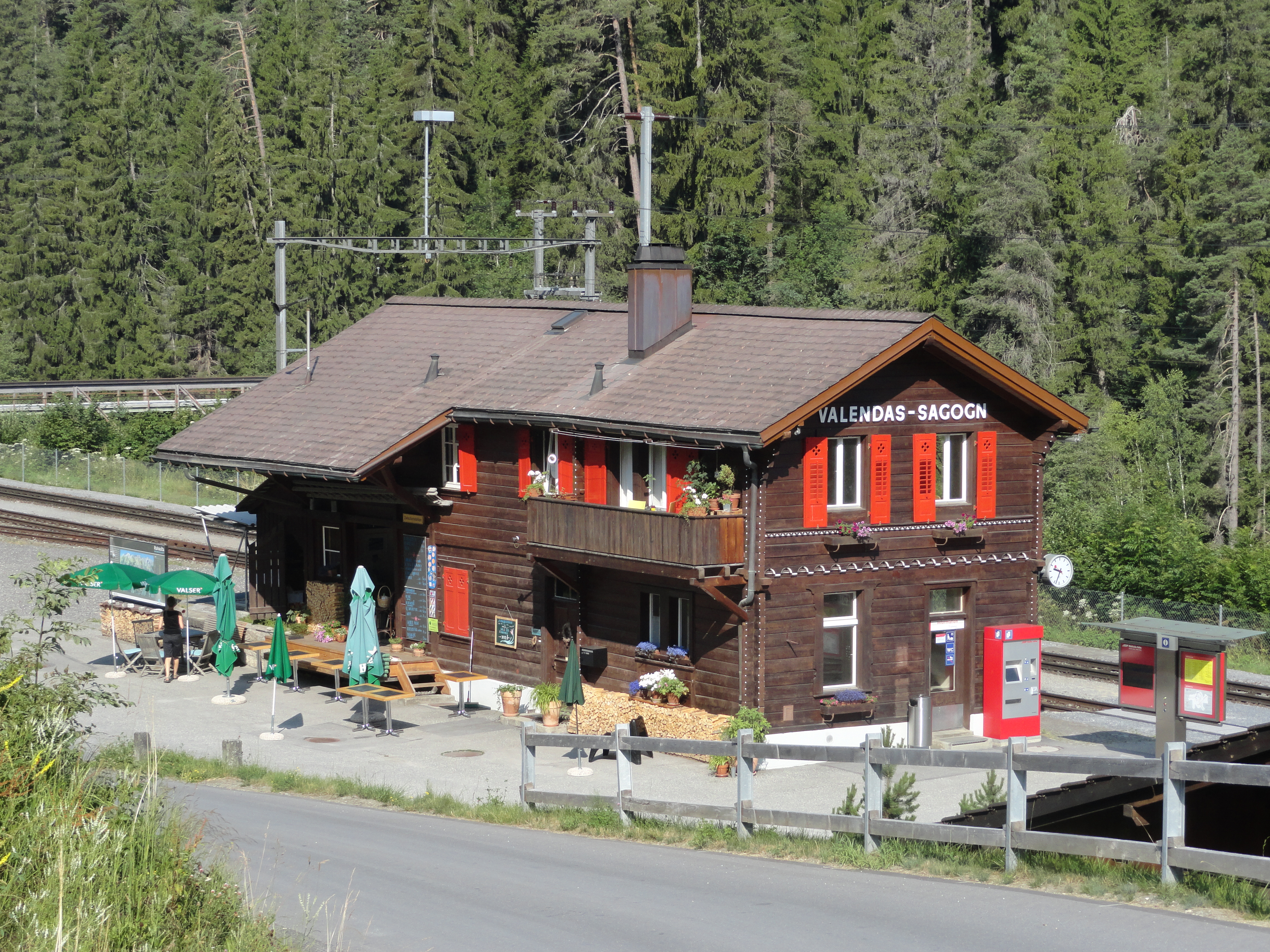
- The station in 2013

General information
- Location: Station 220; Safiental; Switzerland
- Coordinates: 46°47′30″N 9°16′32″E
- Elevation: 668 m (2,192 ft)
- Owner: Rhaetian Railway
- Line: Reichenau-Tamins–Disentis/Mustér line
- Distance: 36.9 km (22.9 mi) from Landquart
- Train operators: Rhaetian Railway
- Connections: PostAuto Schweiz buses

History
- Opened: 1 June 1903
- Electrified: 22 May 1922

Passengers
- 2018: 100 per weekday

Services
Preceding station	Rhaetian Railway	Following station
Ilanz Terminus	RE 5	Trin towards Chur
Castrisch towards Disentis/Mustér	RE 7 Limited service	Versam-Safien towards Chur
Location

Valendas-Sagogn railway station is a station on the Reichenau-Tamins–Disentis/Mustér railway of the Rhaetian Railway in the Swiss canton of Graubünden. It is situated alongside the Anterior Rhine, and marks the upstream end of the railway's scenic passage through the Ruinaulta or Rhine Gorge. The station is located on the south bank of the river in the municipality of Safiental, and serves the villages of Valendas and Sagogn, which lie at higher elevations on either side of the gorge.

== Services ==
As of the December 2025 timetable change, the following services stop at Valendas-Sagogn:

- RegioExpress: hourly service between Ilanz and Chur and limited direct service to Disentis/Mustér.

== Gallery ==
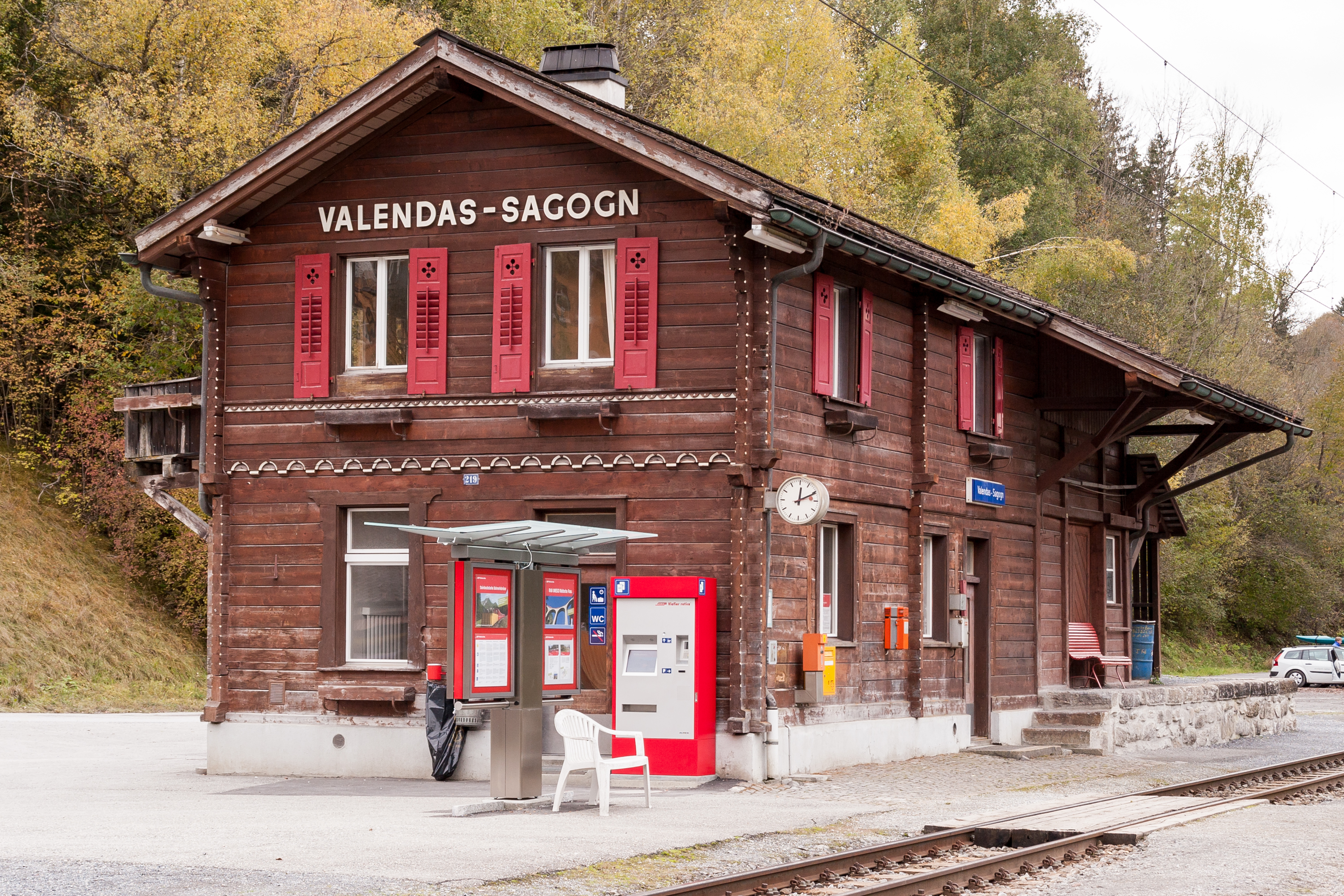
The station building from the east

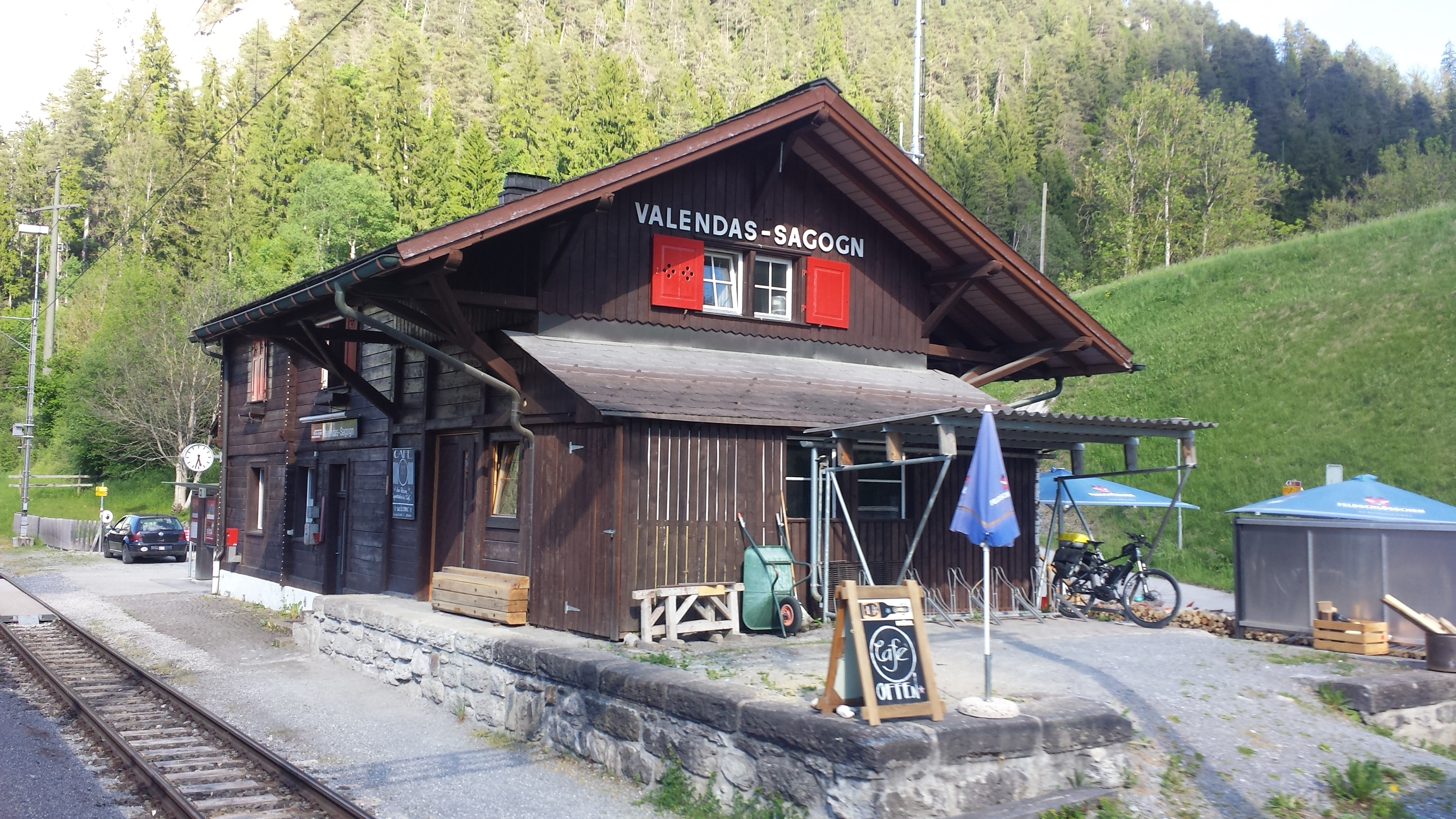
The station building from the west
