= Ilanz railway station =

Railway station in Switzerland

Ilanz
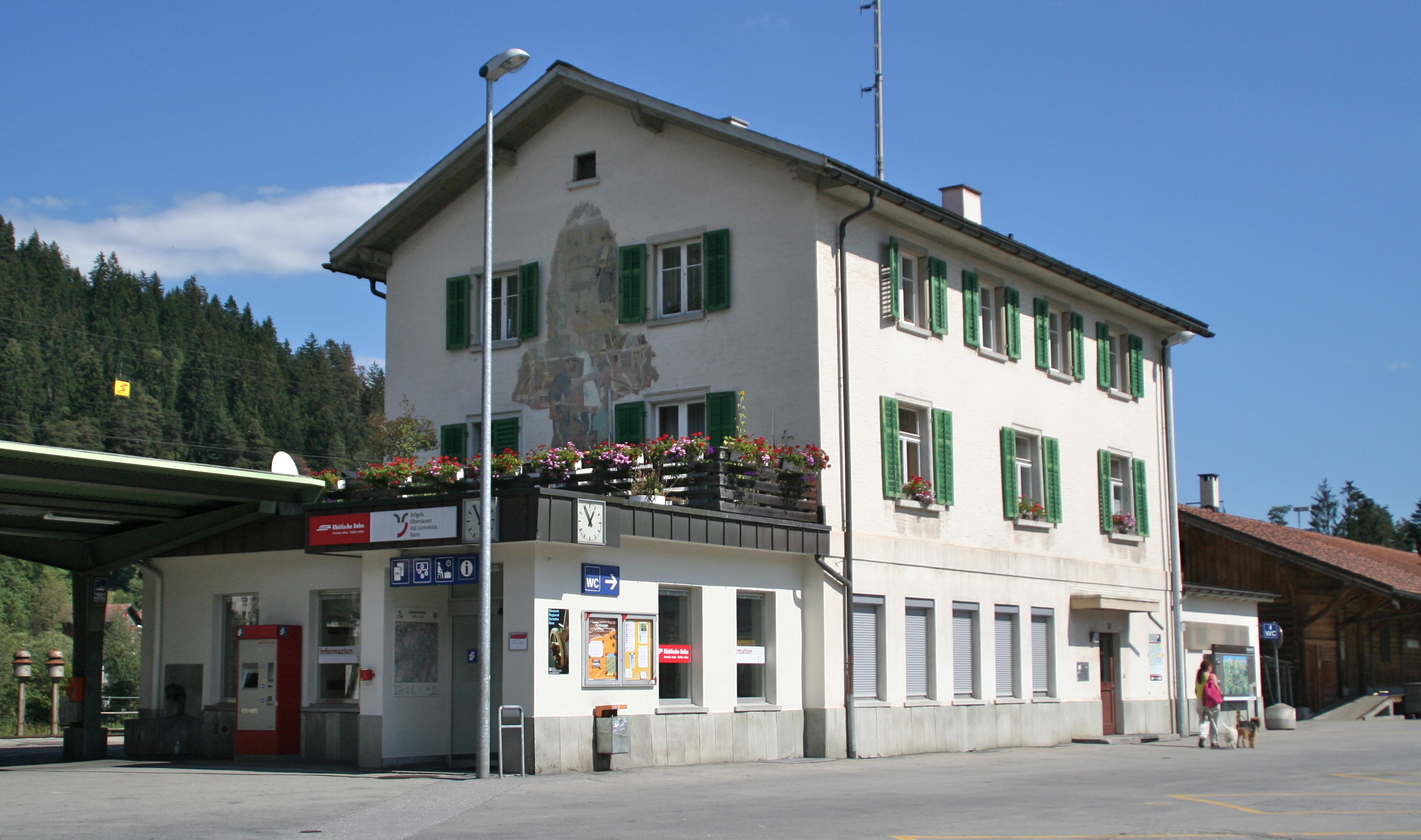
- The station building in 2011

General information
- Location: Bahnhofstrasse; Ilanz/Glion; Switzerland
- Coordinates: 46°46′31″N 9°12′27″E
- Elevation: 698 m (2,290 ft)
- Owner: Rhaetian Railway
- Line: Reichenau-Tamins–Disentis/Mustér line
- Distance: 42.9 km (26.7 mi) from Landquart
- Train operators: Rhaetian Railway
- Connections: PostAuto Schweiz buses

History
- Opened: 1 June 1903
- Electrified: 22 May 1922

Passengers
- 2018: 2,000 per weekday

Services
Preceding station	Rhaetian Railway	Following station
Terminus	RE 5	Valendas-Sagogn towards Chur
Rueun towards Disentis/Mustér	RE 7	Castrisch towards Chur
Location

Ilanz railway station (German: Bahnhof Ilanz) is a railway station in the municipality of Ilanz/Glion, in the Swiss canton of Graubünden. It is an intermediate stop on the 1,000 mm (3 ft 3 3/8 in) gauge Reichenau-Tamins–Disentis/Mustér line of the Rhaetian Railway.

== Services ==
As of the December 2025 timetable change, the following services stop at Ilanz:

- RegioExpress: hourly service to Disentis/Mustér and half-hourly service to Chur.

== Facilities ==
The station has a toilet at the back of the building. There is also a staffed ticket desk as well as a kiosk and various vending machines.

== Location ==
The station is in the heart of the town, 5 mins from the migros shopping centre and only 2 or 3 minutes from the town centre. It is directly outside the post office where the postautos (buses) can be taken.

== Postauto Connections ==
The buses all collect outside the station and depart and arrive to supplement the railway timetables. Routes include:

- Ilanz-Vals Zerfreila
- Ilanz-Reien
- Ilanz-Falera
