= Tavanasa-Breil/Brigels railway station =

Railway station in Switzerland

Tavanasa-Breil/Brigels
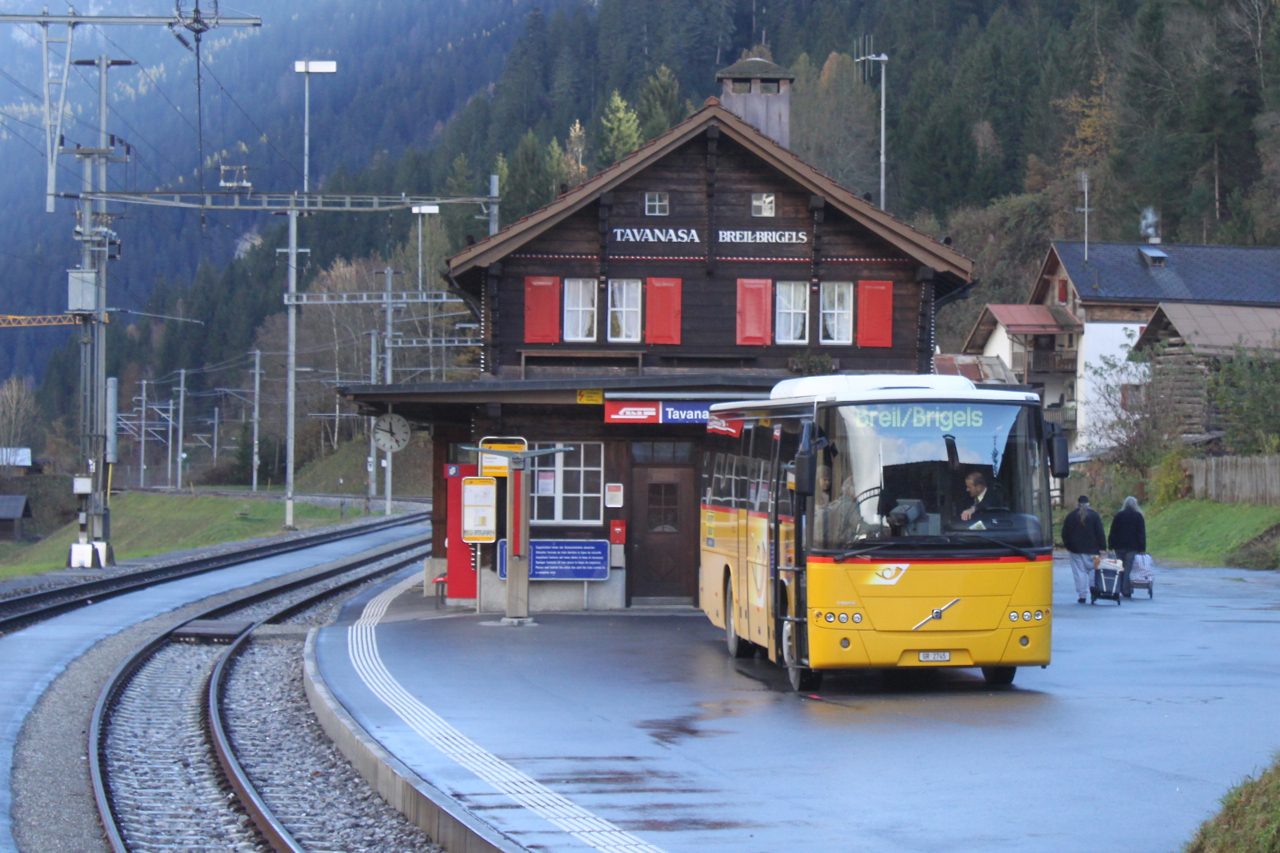
- The station building in 2013

General information
- Location: Via dalla Staziun 248; Breil/Brigels; Switzerland
- Coordinates: 46°45′17″N 9°03′45″E
- Elevation: 787 m (2,582 ft)
- Owner: Rhaetian Railway
- Line: Reichenau-Tamins–Disentis/Mustér line
- Distance: 54.9 km (34.1 mi) from Landquart
- Train operators: Rhaetian Railway
- Connections: PostAuto Schweiz buses

History
- Opened: 1 August 1912
- Electrified: 22 May 1922

Passengers
- 2018: 260 per weekday

Services
Preceding station	Rhaetian Railway	Following station
Trun towards Disentis/Mustér	RE 7	Waltensburg/Vuorz towards Chur
Location

Tavanasa-Breil/Brigels railway station (German: Bahnhof Tavanasa-Breil/Brigels) is a railway station in the municipality of Breil/Brigels, in the Swiss canton of Graubünden. It is an intermediate stop on the 1,000 mm (3 ft 3 3/8 in) gauge Reichenau-Tamins–Disentis/Mustér line of the Rhaetian Railway.

== Services ==
As of the December 2023 timetable change, the following services stop at Tavanasa-Breil/Brigels:

- RegioExpress: hourly service between Disentis/Mustér and Chur.
