= Castrisch railway station =

Railway station in Switzerland

Castrisch
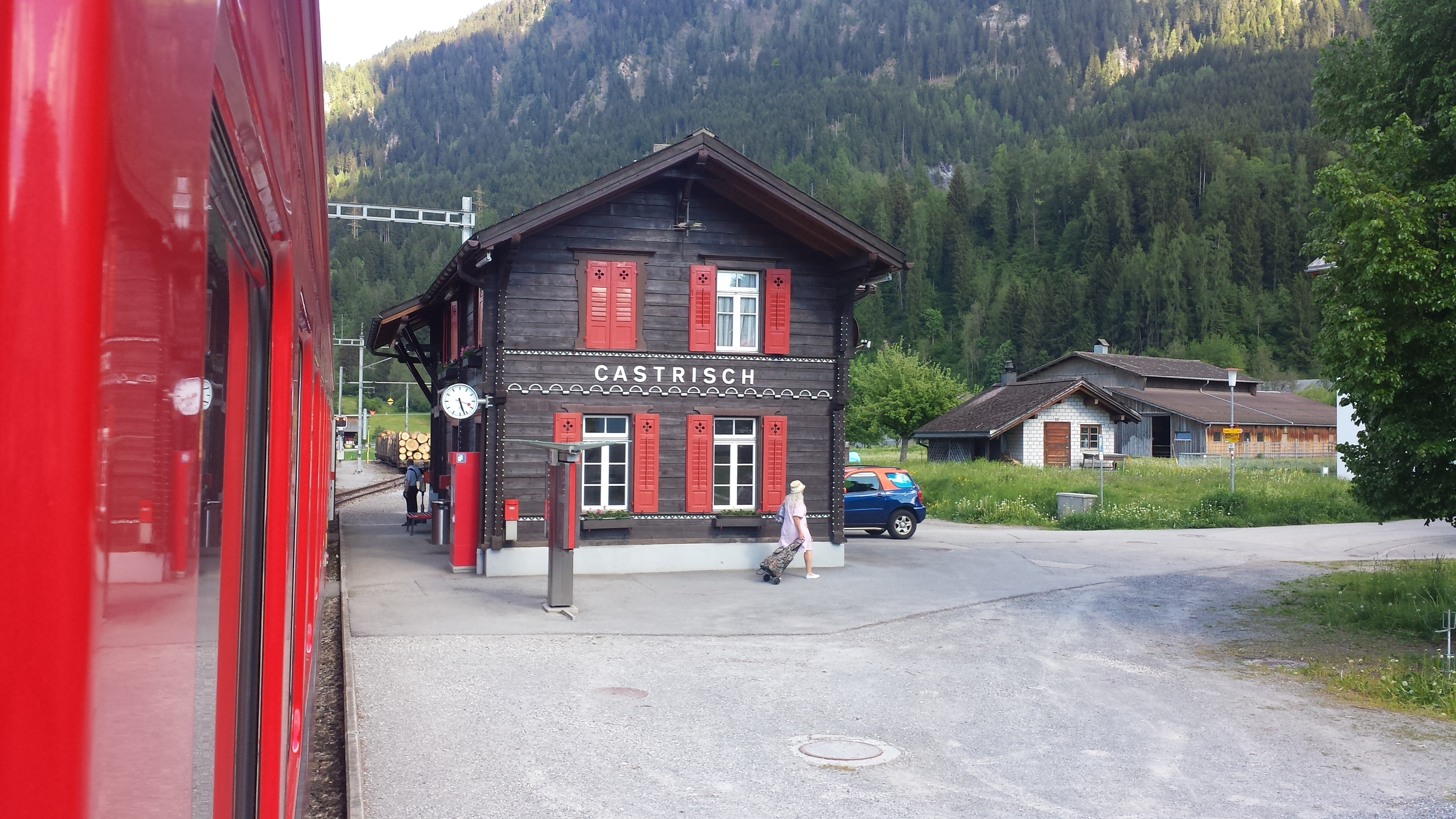
- The station building in 2017

General information
- Location: Via dalla Staziun 98; Castrisch; Switzerland
- Coordinates: 46°46′43″N 9°13′59″E
- Elevation: 705 m (2,313 ft)
- Owner: Rhaetian Railway
- Line: Reichenau-Tamins–Disentis/Mustér line
- Distance: 40.7 km (25.3 mi) from Landquart
- Train operators: Rhaetian Railway

History
- Opened: 1 June 1903
- Electrified: 22 May 1922

Passengers
- 2018: 120 per weekday

Services
Preceding station	Rhaetian Railway	Following station
Ilanz towards Disentis/Mustér	RE 7	Valendas-Sagogn towards Chur
Location

Castrisch railway station is a railway station on the Reichenau-Tamins–Disentis/Mustér railway of the Rhaetian Railway in the Swiss canton of Graubünden. It serves the village of Castrisch in the municipality of Ilanz/Glion.

== Services ==
As of the December 2023 timetable change, the following services stop at Castrisch:

- RegioExpress: hourly service between Disentis/Mustér and Chur.

== Gallery ==
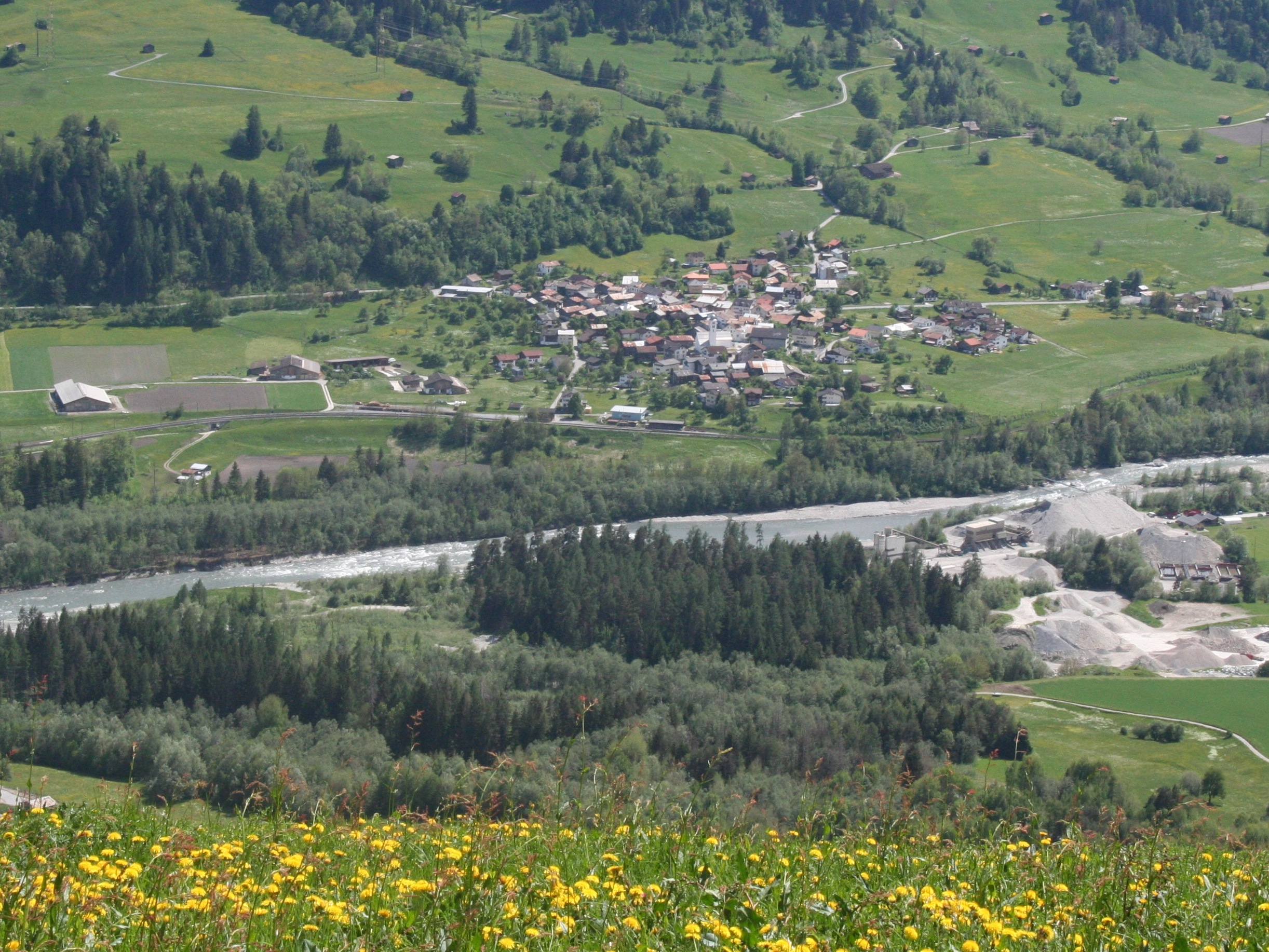
The station can be seen in the centre of the image

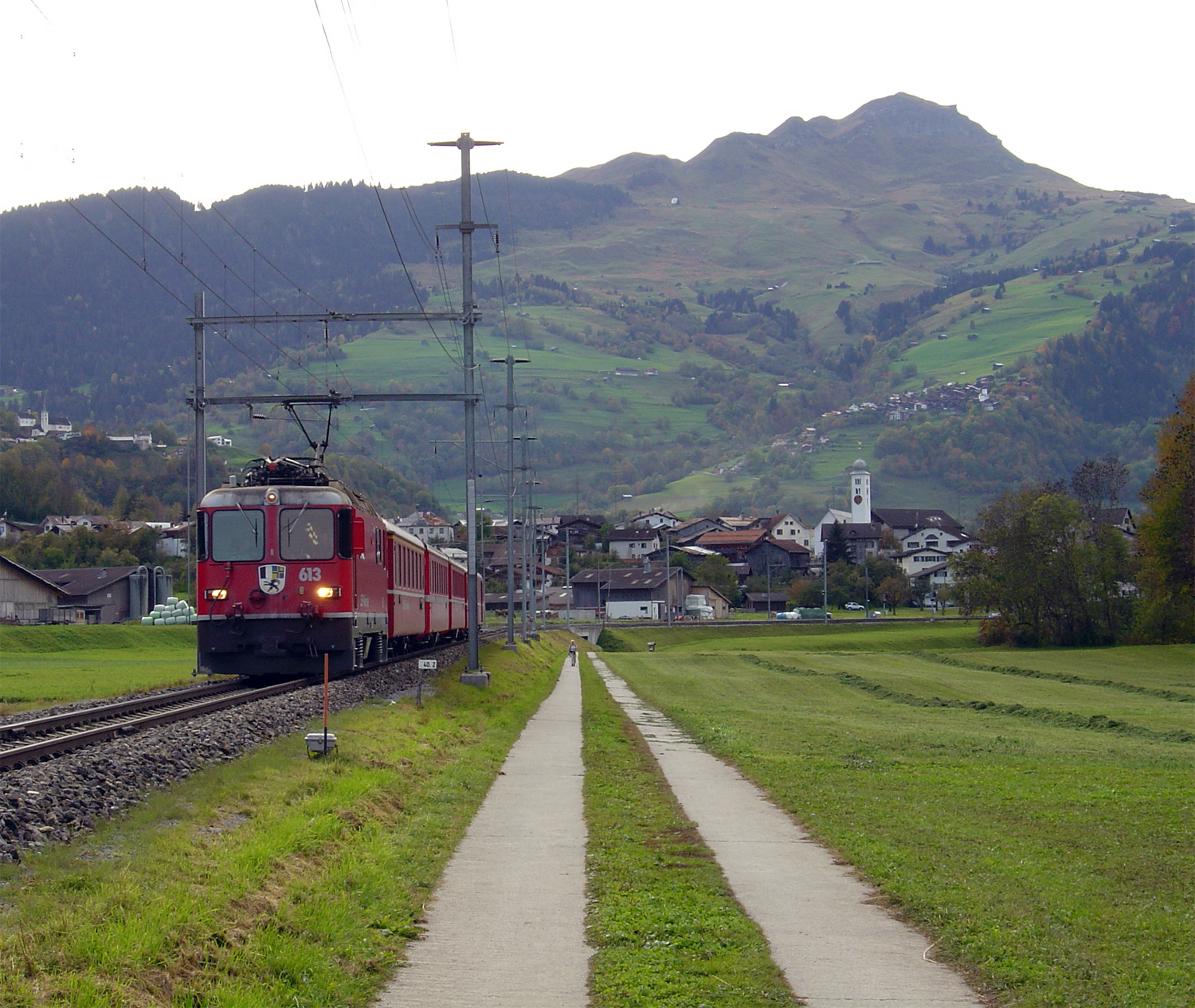
Rail line through Castrisch
