= Reichenau-Tamins–Disentis/Mustér railway =

Railway line in Switzerland

Reichenau-Tamins–Disentis/Mustér
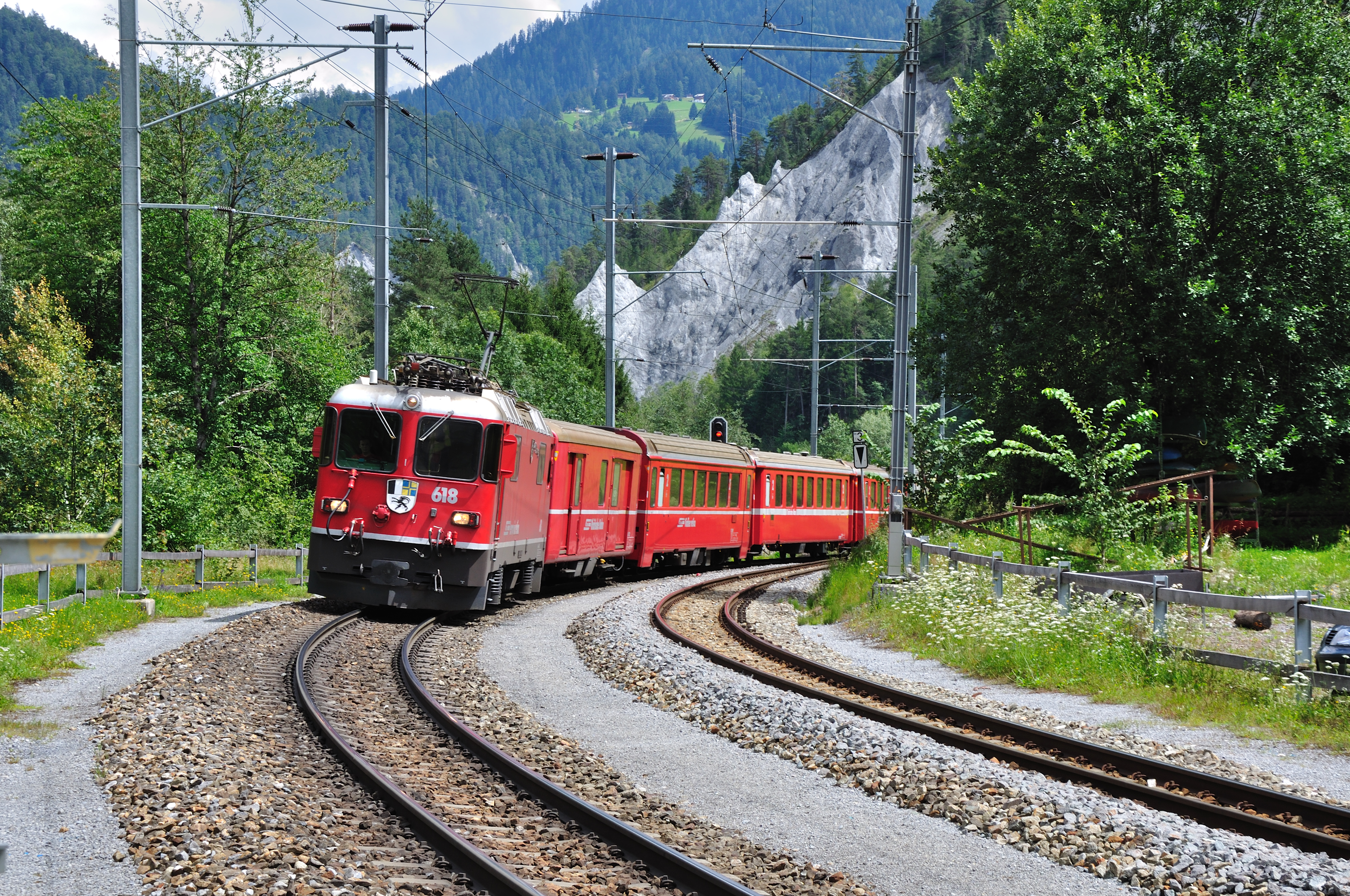
- Reichenau-Tamins–Disentis/Mustér Railway at Carrera

Overview
- Owner: Rhaetian Railway
- Line number: 920
- Termini: Reichenau-Tamins; Disentis/Mustér

Technical
- Line length: 49.31 km (30.64 mi)
- Number of tracks: Single track with Passing loops
- Track gauge: 1,000 mm (3 ft 3 3/8 in) metre gauge
- Electrification: 11 kV 16.7 Hz AC overhead catenary
- Maximum incline: 1.6%

The Reichenau-Tamins–Disentis/Mustér railway (also called the Oberländerlinie—highland line) is a Swiss metre-gauge railway, which is operated by the Rhaetian Railway (Rhätischen Bahn; RhB). It connects the stations of Reichenau-Tamins and Disentis/Mustér.

== History ==
=== Reichenau-Tamins – Ilanz highland line ===
The first proposals for a highland line or Vorderrhein (Anterior Rhine) line go back to 1890. At that time an engineer, Marchion, applied for a concession for the construction and operation of a railway line from Reichenau to Disentis. Marchion then tested a total of four options for the route from Reichenau to Ilanz. The options started either in Reichenau or in Bonaduz:

- Bonaduz–Versam–Valendas: 14.7 km (9.1 mi), large viaducts, estimated construction cost: CHF 6.2 m
- Reichenau–Trin–Flims–Laax–Ilanz: 25.5 km (15.8 mi), crest tunnel near Flims, estimated construction cost: CHF 5.5 m
- Reichenau–Trin–Conn–Laax–Ilanz: 23.7 km (14.7 mi), several viaducts, and two tunnels estimated construction cost: CHF 6.2 m
- a line through the Rhine Gorge: 19.3 km (12.0 mi), good location, estimated construction cost: CHF 4.3 m.

Marchion finally received a concession in 1894 for the Reichenau–Ilanz route, but he sold it to the Rhaetian Railway on 27 November 1897. This company in turn commissioned engineer R. Moser to review all four options. Finally, a commission headed by Professor Albert Heim from Zurich recommended that the latter option be built through the Anterior Rhine Gorge. The Board of the Rhaetian Railway decided to build a line on this route on 11 July 1898. The RhB also considered an option to extend the line from Ilanz further along the Anterior Rhine to Disentis.

==== Construction ====
Construction began in the autumn of 1900 under the direction of senior engineer R. Hennings, who also led the construction work on the Albula Railway at the same time. The 19.3 km-long route was divided into three lots: Reichenau–Versam, Versam–Valendas-Sagogn, and Valendas-Sagogn–Ilanz.

The Rhine gorge presented construction workers and engineers with problems, as the rock there is very brittle and the Anterior Rhine in this area rises very high in heavy rain or during snowmelt. In addition, because of its instability, the rock from the Rhine Gorge could not be used for the construction of walls and track, so all the necessary stones had to be brought from more distant quarries. To facilitate this, section engineer Peter Saluz built a 750 mm gauge steam-hauled construction line, which was not opened until 1901.

Despite many interruptions due to landslides and floods, the construction work kept to schedule and the Reichenau-Tamins–Ilanz line was formally opened on 1 June 1903.

=== The Ilanz–Disentis extension ===
It took a total of nine years until the extension of the highland line from Ilanz to Disentis could be opened. This was due to the fact that two other complementary lines, Davos Platz–Filisur and Samedan–Pontresina, had a higher priority and thus were built first. Engineer R. Moser, who had been commissioned to prepare the plans for this line, relied on the plans of Engineer Marchion, who intended to build the line on the right bank of the Rhine to Trun and then on the northern slope of the Surselva to Disentis. The final project was developed by the Batignolles company in Paris; its projected lines crossed the Rhine three times, but otherwise, it followed the original plan.

==== The construction works ====
Construction began on 10 April 1910 under the direction of Chief Engineer Peter Saluz. The line was divided into four lots: Ilanz–Petersbach, Petersbach–Trun, Trun–Sumvitg-Cumpadials, and Sumvitg-Cumpadials–Disentis. The first two lots did not cause any problems as they ran along the bottom of the valley and required landfills and embankments only when the line approached the river. The other two lots required the construction of engineering structures and tunnels. Disentis station was designed to be larger than all the other stations, as it had already been planned for the opening of the Furka Oberalp Railway. As construction progressed rapidly along the entire line, it was possible to open the line officially on 1 August 1912 after only two years of construction.

==== New Carrerabach bridge ====
After a construction period of around one year, the new Carrerabach bridge was put into operation on 17 November 2011. Thus, the bridge over the Carrerabach was renewed for the second time since the commissioning of the line. As early as 1981, the original stone arch bridge had been replaced by a new structure. This time, not only was the bridge renewed, but the whole trackbed was rebuilt on a roughly one-kilometre section in order to increase the level in the area of the bridge by around three metres and to move the line laterally in the area of the bridge. The new higher position of the bridge and its displacement was intended to prevent problems with erosion and rockfall and to improve flood protection permanently. Accidents such as the derailment of a regional train on the Carrerabach bridge on 11 September 2011 due to a mudslide following a storm should be avoided in the future.

== Route ==
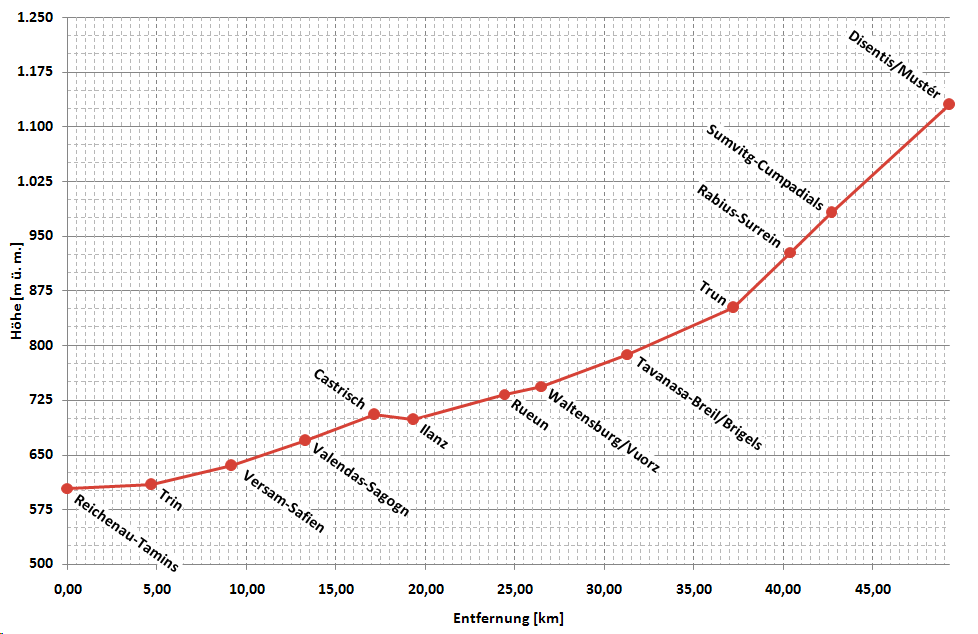
Altitude profile of the line

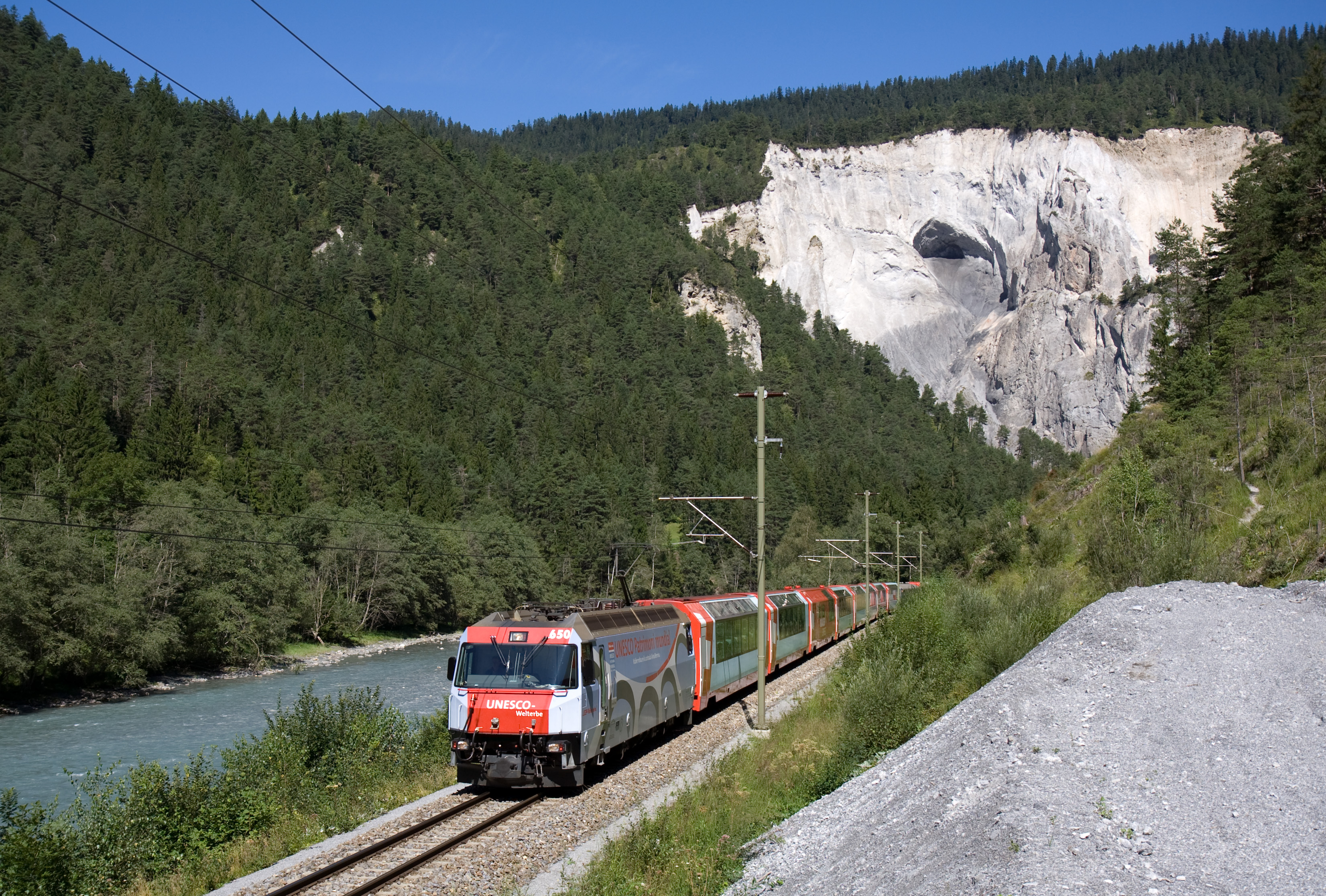
Two coupled Glacier Express trains in the Anterior Rhine gorge

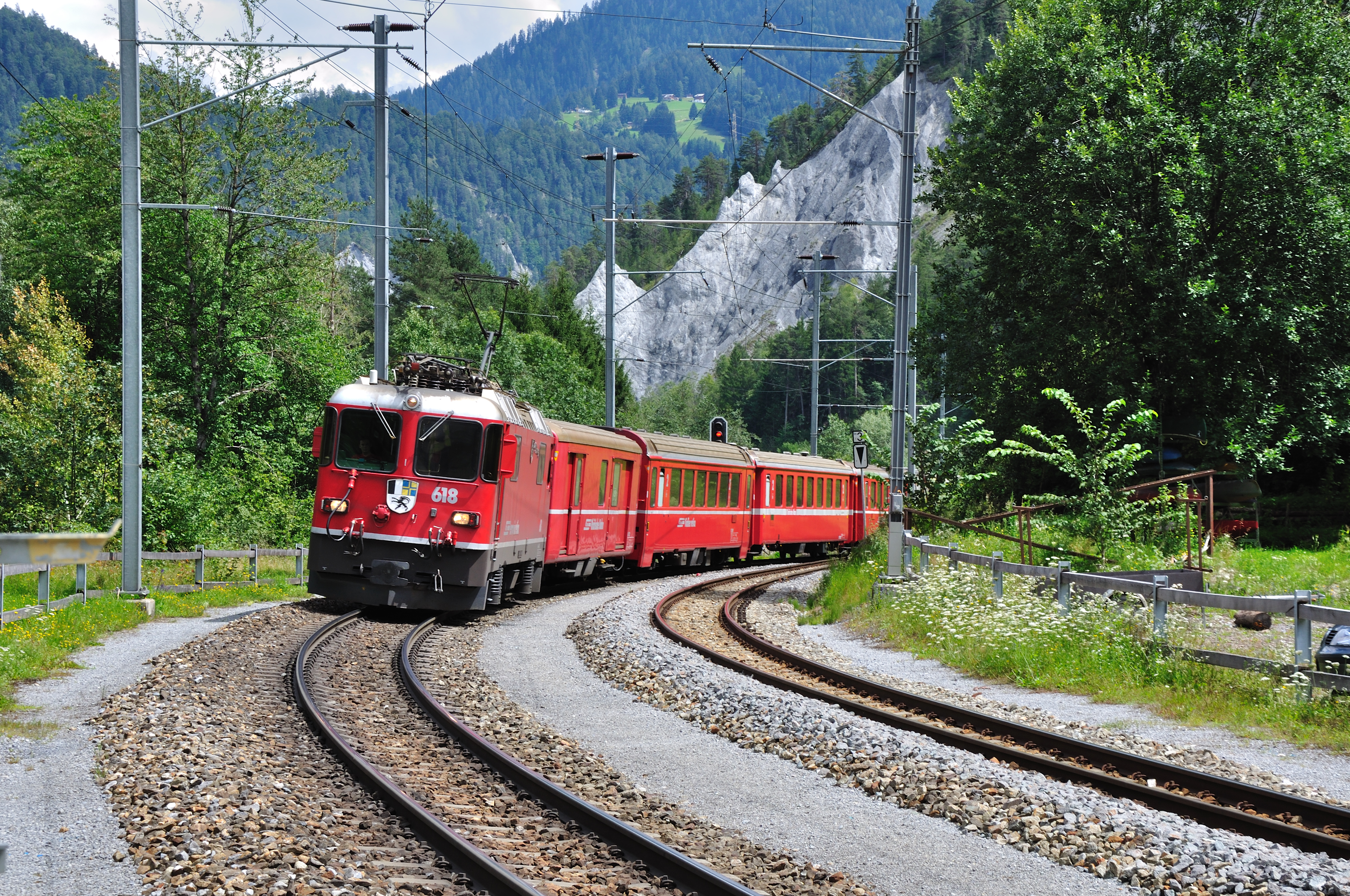
Mustér railway through Rhine gorge

The line begins at the junction station of the highland line and the Albula Railway at Reichenau-Tamins. It branches off the Landquart–Thusis railway after the steel bridge over the Posterior Rhine. The line then crosses the Anterior Rhine and runs to the entrance of the Rhine gorge at Trin station. In contrast to the parallel road, which rises over 500 m (1,600 ft) to Flims and Laax, the railway runs at the bottom of the narrow Ruinaulta gorge. Artificial structures predominate on this part of the line in an otherwise largely untouched landscape. It crosses the gorge with the help of two tunnels and several loops and passes through the stations of Versam-Safien, Valendas-Sagogn and Castrisch. Subsequently, the line runs through the now shallower and wider Anterior Rhine valley to Ilanz where it returns to the side of the road and then climbs at a gradient of 1.6% to Trun. Between Trun and Ilanz, the line crosses the Anterior Rhine three times and passes through two tunnels and the stations of Rueun, Waltensburg/Vuorz and Tavanasa-Breil/Brigels. From Trun, the line runs on the northern valley slope with a gradient of 2.7% through the stations of Rabius-Surrein and Sumvitg-Cumpadials to Disentis/Mustér. Between Sumvitg-Cumpadials and Disentis, the valley becomes narrower and steeper, so there are many engineering structures and bridges, such as the 106 m (348 ft) Val Russein viaduct between Sumvitg-Cumpadials and Disentis.

== Structures ==
=== Stations ===
==== Versam-Safien ====
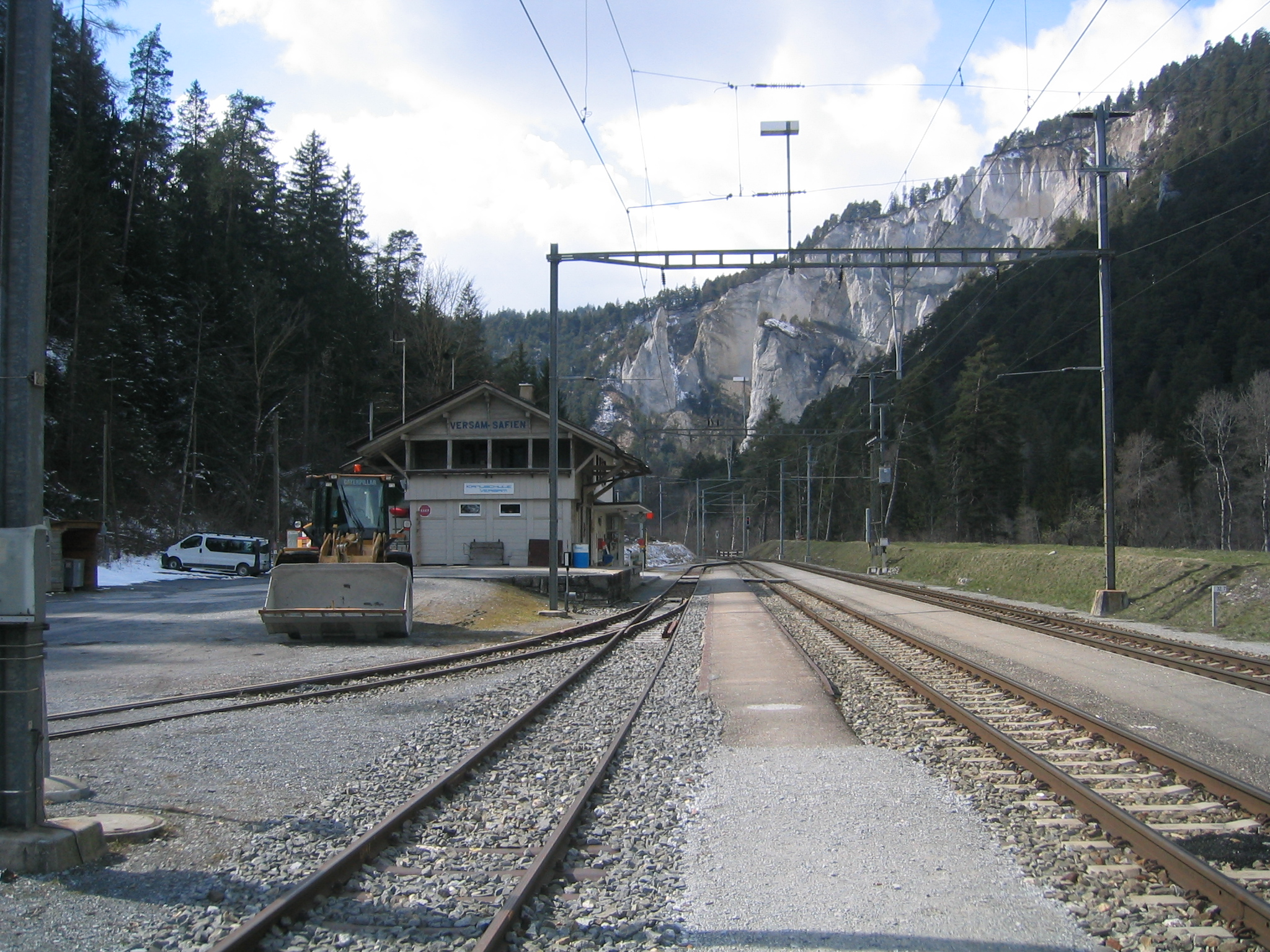
Versam-Safien station with Ruinaulta gorge

Versam-Safien station is at the 32.73 km (20.34 mi) mark of the line. Since the line runs in the very narrow Ruinaulta gorge along the Anterior Rhine, the communities that the stations are named after lie up to 3 km (2 mi) away and up to 300 m (980 ft) higher. The through station of Versam has two through tracks and two dead-end tracks. The station has a main platform and two island platforms, which are reached by a crossing.

The station was built for the opening of the line from Reichenau and Ilanz in 1903. In the past, the importance of the station was higher than it is today. Although a road was completed from Versam to Reichenau and Ilanz in 1881, due to the low motorisation until the 1950s, it must be assumed that the majority of the inhabitants used the railway and thus the station until well into the 20th century. From there they used a stagecoach or in the winter horse sleighs on the unfenced road to Safiental until 1950.

The RegioExpress trains of the Rhaetian Railway stop every hour at the station. Freight trains run irregularly and the Glacier Express daily. The Postauto serves the station hourly to spare the passengers the climb to the actual village and to open up the whole Safien valley.

The station building is no longer used for rail purposes. Next to the station, there is a wood loading yard, which can be approached via the dead-end tracks.

==== Valendas-Sagogn ====
Also, the Valendas-Sagogn station carries a double name but here for another reason: a bridge over the Rhine, which was built during the construction of the line, allowed access to the station from both sides of the Rhine. The station is located on the southern (right) bank of the Rhine and was opened in 1903 and connected on both sides by a dirt road, which was replaced by a paved road on the Valendas side during improvement works in 2010. Services run every hour towards Ilanz and Disentis as well as towards Reichenau-Tamins, Chur and Scuol-Tarasp. The road to Sagogn remains unpaved.

=== Bridges ===
One of the most important bridges is the Russein bridge between Sumvitg and Disentis. The arch bridge, built in 1912 from natural stone, is located parallel to the old Russein bridge (a covered wooden road bridge built in 1857). The bridge is almost 100 m (330 ft) long and crosses the stream at a height of 56 m (184 ft) on four arches.

The bridge over the Val Sogn Placi at Disentis was destroyed by an avalanche on 9 February 1984. The 54 m (177 ft) stone arch bridge was replaced by a 54 m (177 ft) (Note: Length according to H.G. Wägli) composite reinforced concrete structure. This bridge was put into operation on 16 November 1985. A temporary emergency bridge had been installed in the meantime.

== Operations ==
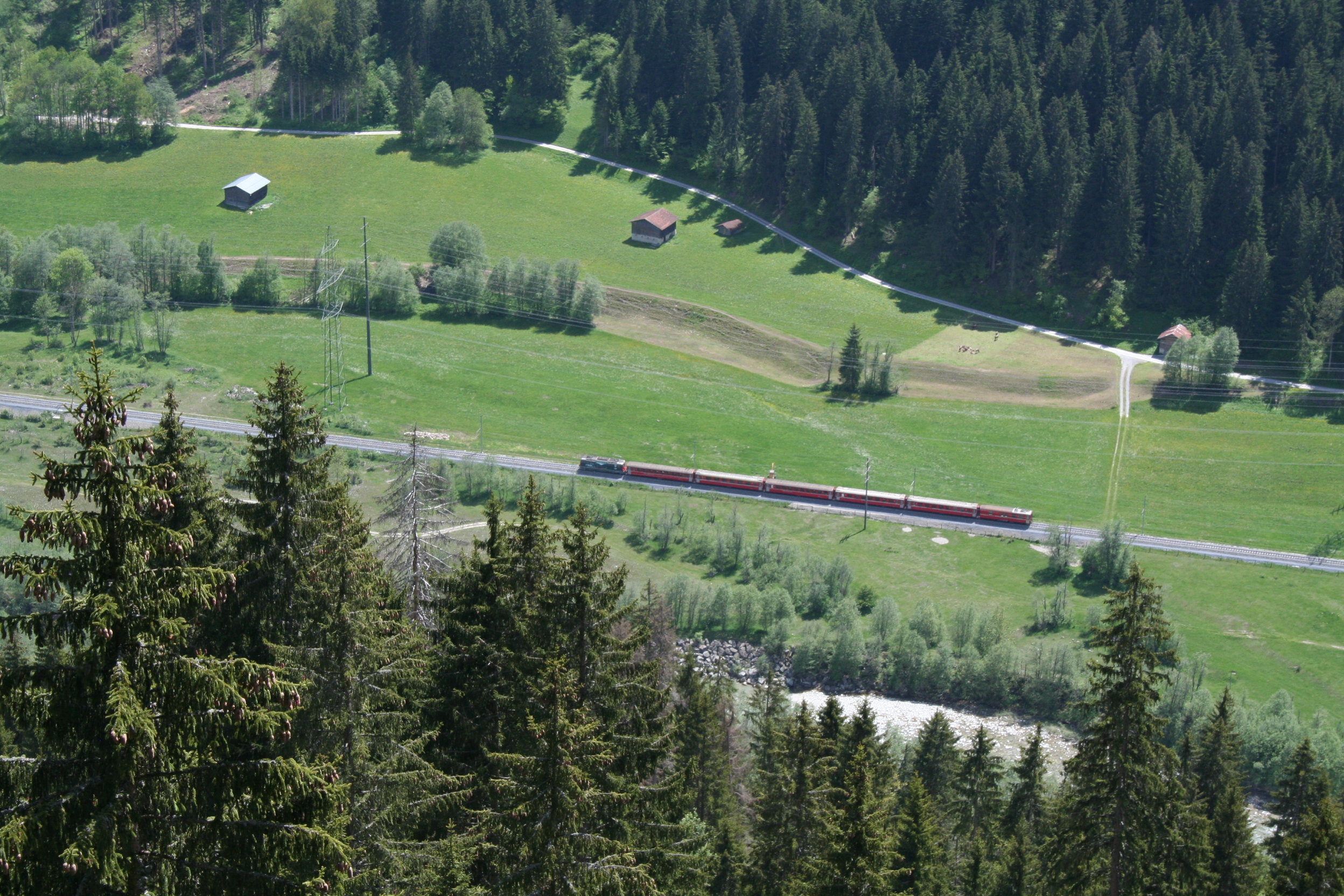
A train below Waltensburg

The line is mainly served by the RegioExpress trains RE 5 (Chur– Ilanz) and RE 7 (Chur– Disentis/Mustér running at half-hourly intervals between Chur and Ilanz and hourly intervals between Ilanz and Disentis/Mustér with extra services during peak hours. Trains from Chur to Disentis/Mustér take an hour and five minutes over the whole line and reach an average speed of 45.5 km/h (28.3 mph). There are also four Glacier Express train pairs each day. Freight trains running irregularly on the line serve the industrial and commercial enterprises in the Anterior Rhine region.
