= Ruinaulta =

Canyon in Switzerland

Coordinates: 46°48′29″N 9°18′54″E

Ruinaulta from the Il Spir viewpoint

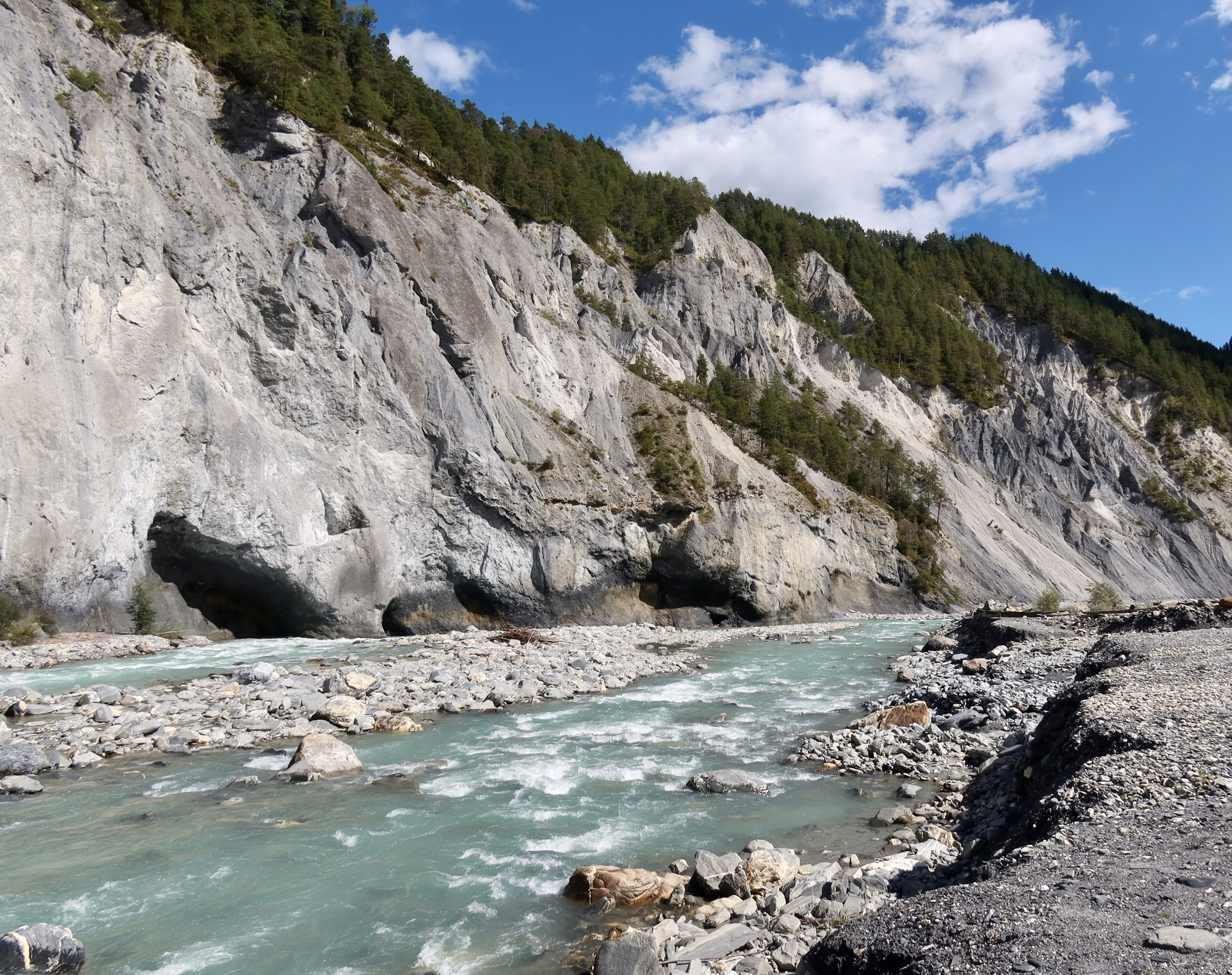
Gravel banks and limestone cliffs on the floor of the Ruinaulta

Ruinaulta, also known as the Rhine Gorge, is a canyon in the canton of Graubünden (Grisons), Switzerland, carved by the Anterior Rhine between the villages of Ilanz/Glion and Reichenau. It was formed by the prehistoric Flims rockslide, which blocked the river and eventually gave rise to the present-day gorge.

The Ruinaulta extends for about 14 kilometres and is characterised by white cliffs, forested slopes, quiet lakes, and varied habitats supporting a diversity of plant and bird life. It can be explored on foot, over water, or by bicycle, and the Rhaetian Railway passes through the gorge, with stations at Valendas-Sagogn and Versam-Safien.

Ruinaulta lies within the Swiss Tectonic Arena Sardona, which was inscribed as a UNESCO World Heritage Site in 2008.

== Formation ==
The Ruinaulta lies between the Surselva and Imboden regions in the canton of Graubünden, extending from Castrisch to Trin along the upper valley of the Anterior Rhine (Vorderrhein). The gorge cuts through deposits of the prehistoric Flims rockslide, in which an estimated 8–9 cubic kilometres (1.9–2.2 cu mi) of rock collapsed from the Flimserstein and neighbouring peaks around 9,500 years ago, in what is considered the largest known landslide in the Alpine region.

The rockslide debris blocked the river, creating Lake Ilanz, which lasted for several centuries before gradually draining as the Anterior Rhine cut through the material. The present-day gorge features a meandering river with alternating gravel and sandbanks, rapids, and river terraces, bordered by cliffs rising to heights of up to 350 metres (1,150 ft).

The steep walls of the gorge are known locally as Ruinas, a term from the Romansh language meaning “pillar,” “gully,” or “scree slope”; aulta means “high.”

== Gallery ==
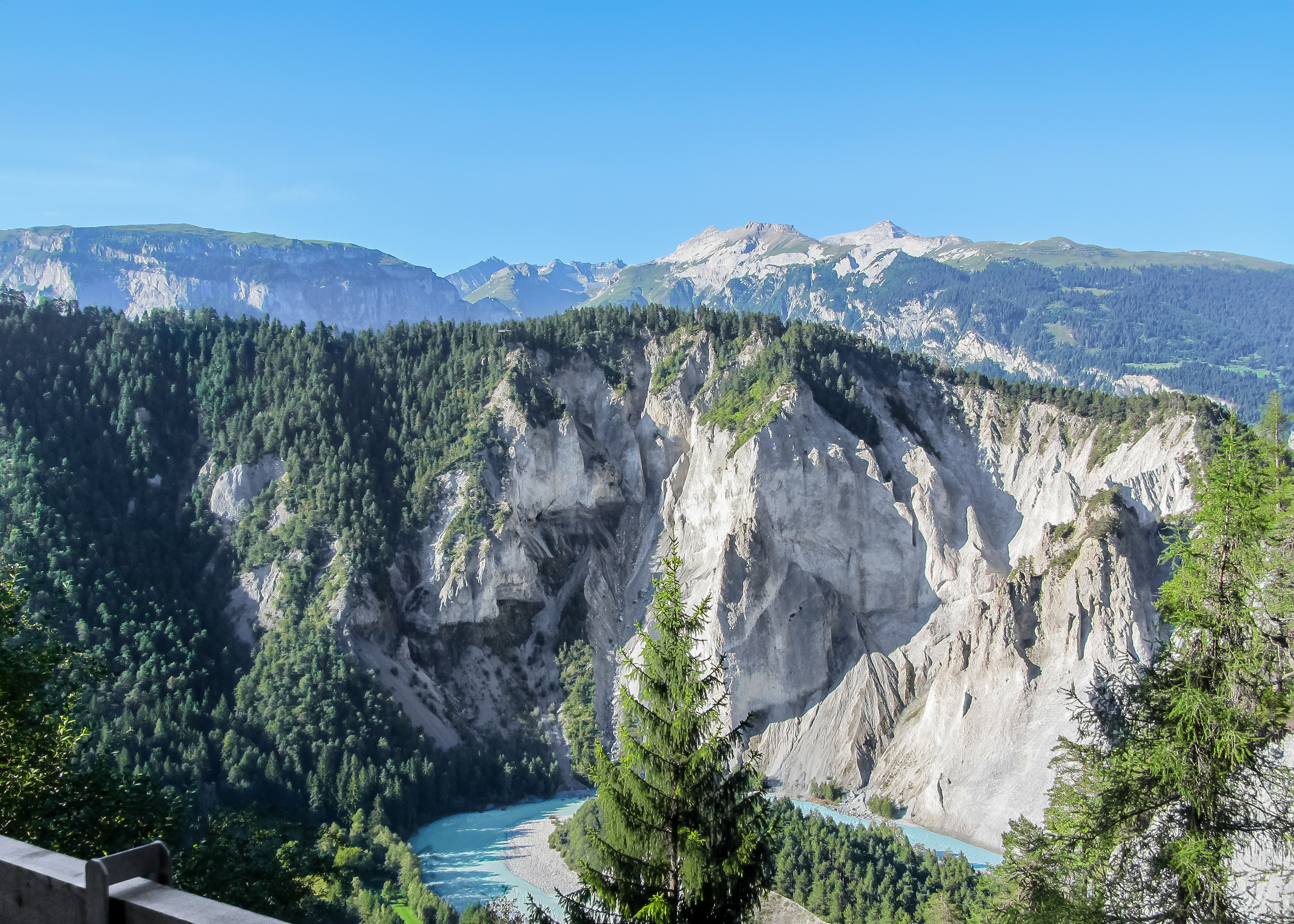
Ruinaulta from the Islabord bus stop in Versam

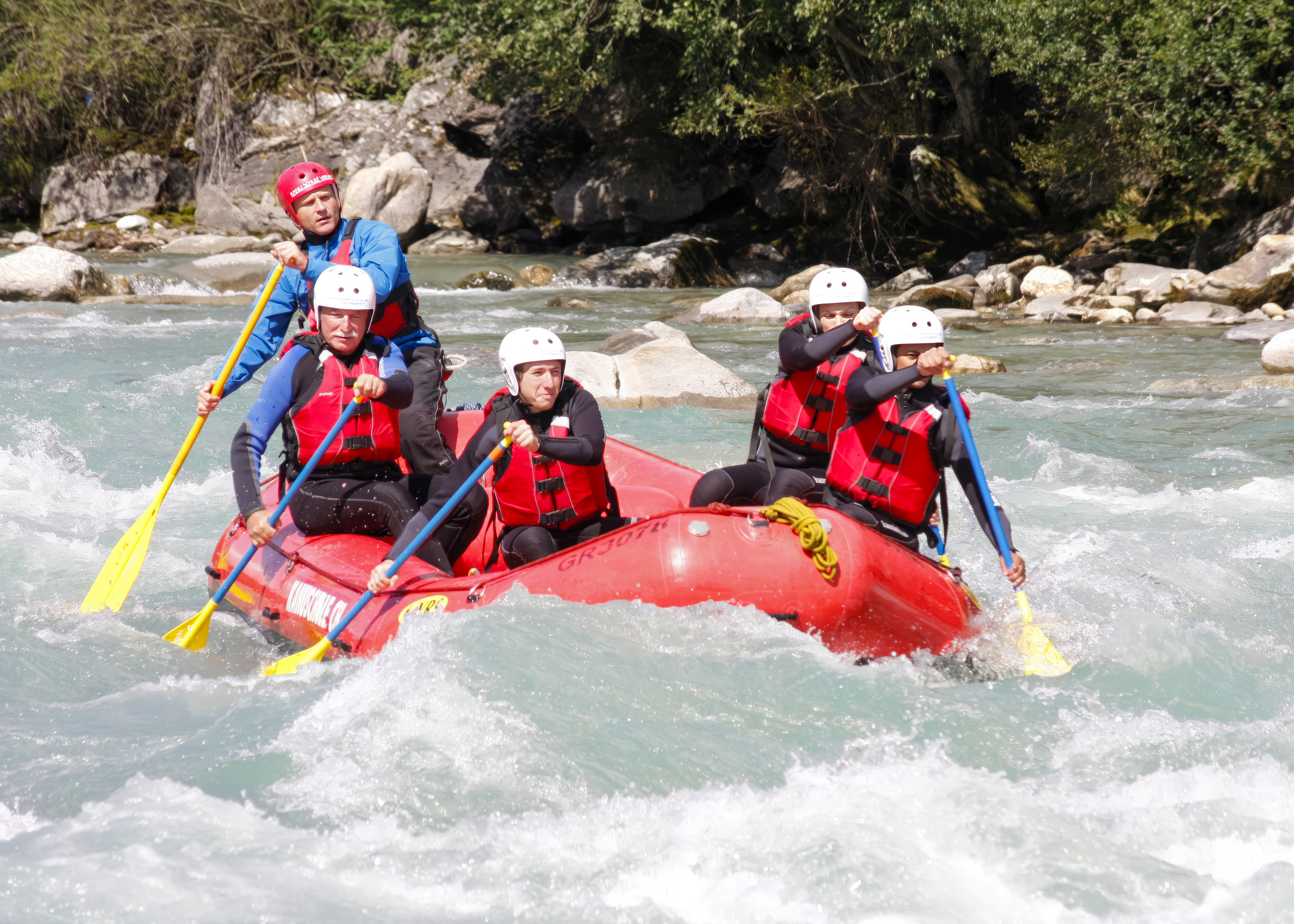
Rafting on the Anterior Rhine from Ilanz to Versam

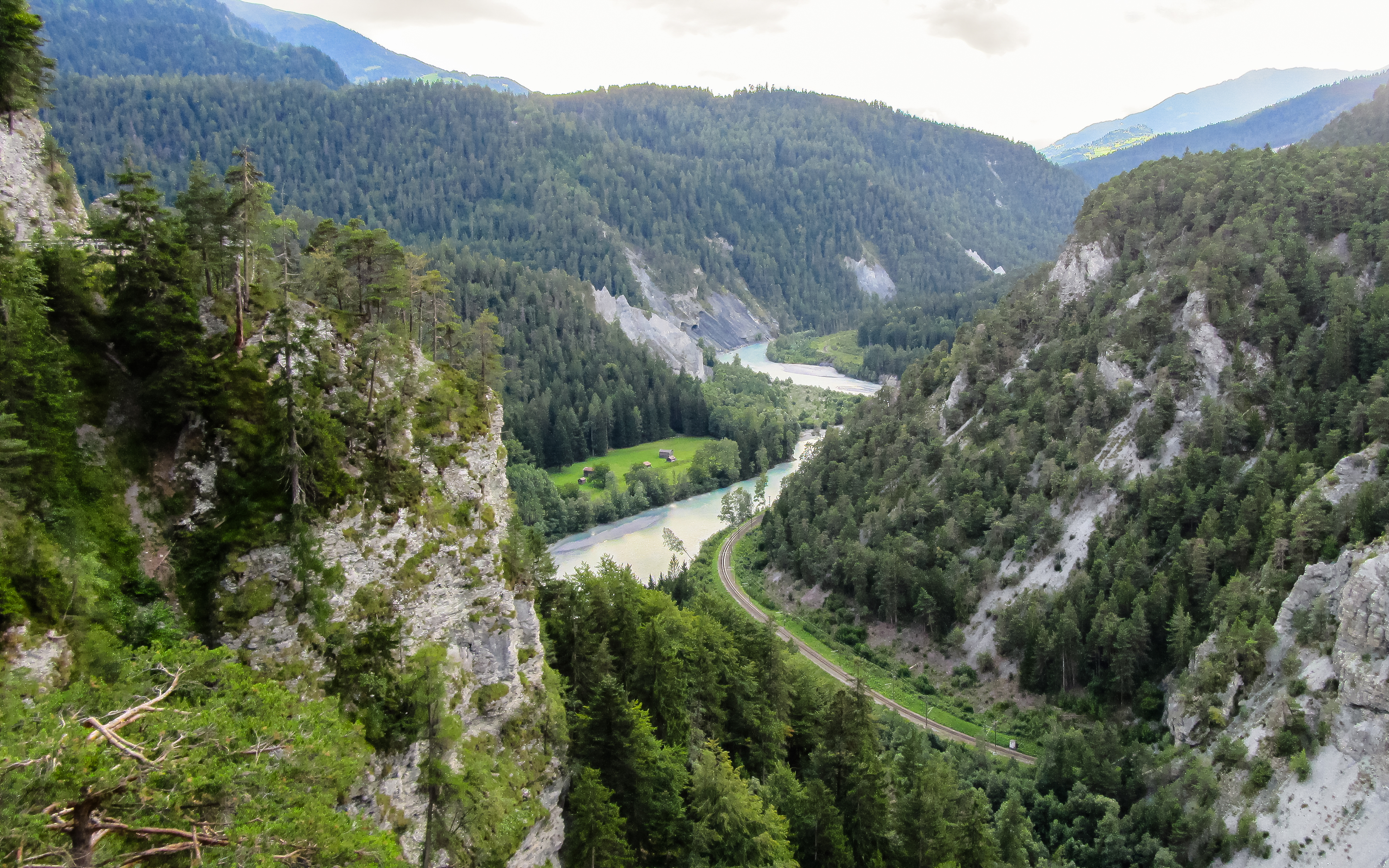
Ruinaulta from Zault Observation Deck in Bonaduz

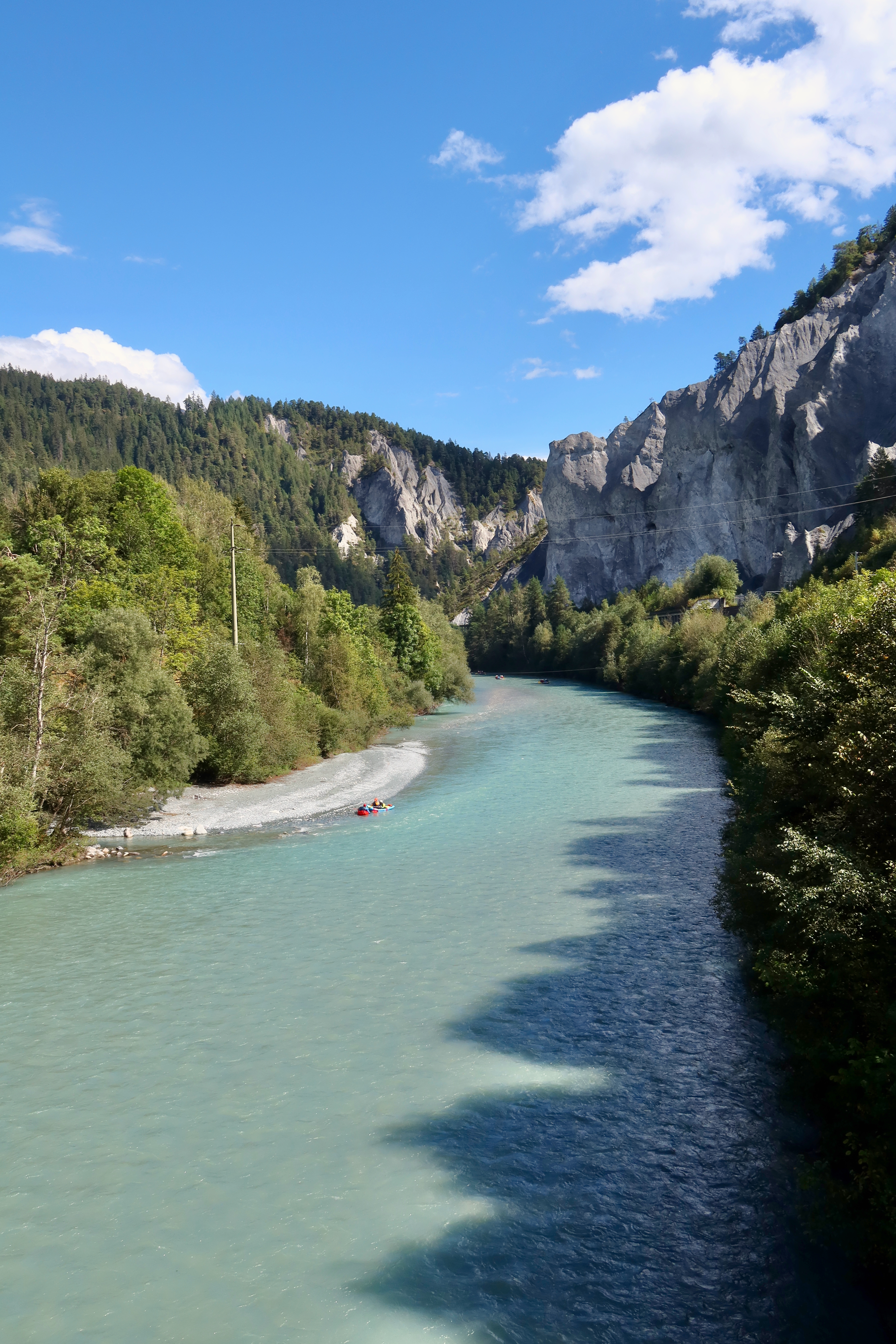
View from a bridge near Valendas-Sagogn railway station over the Ruinaulta

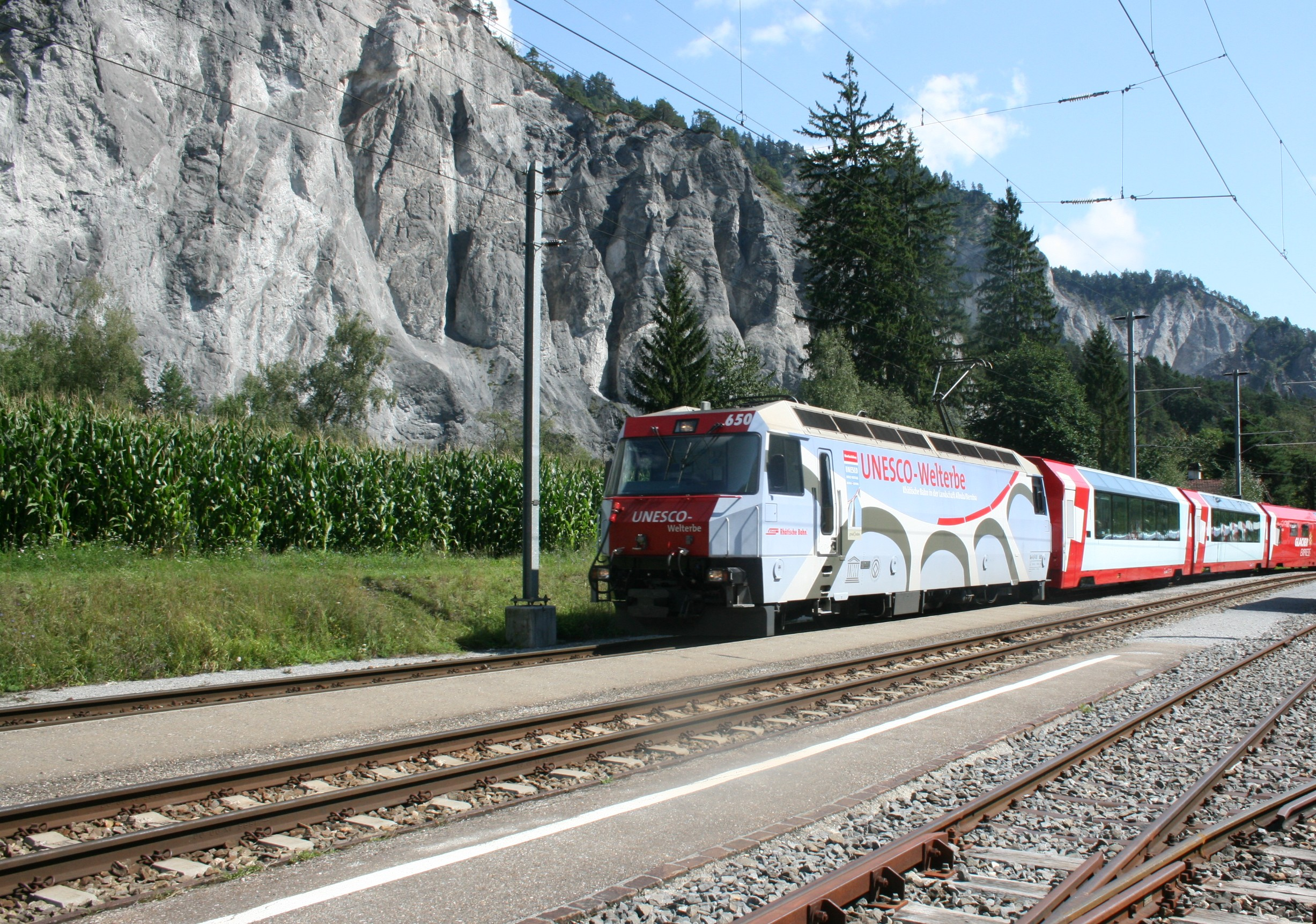
Glacier Express passing through the Ruinaulta

== See also ==
- Geology of the Alps
- List of canyons
- Rhaetian Railway
- Vorderrhein
