= Imboden District =

Imboden District Bezirk Imboden District Il Plaun
- District
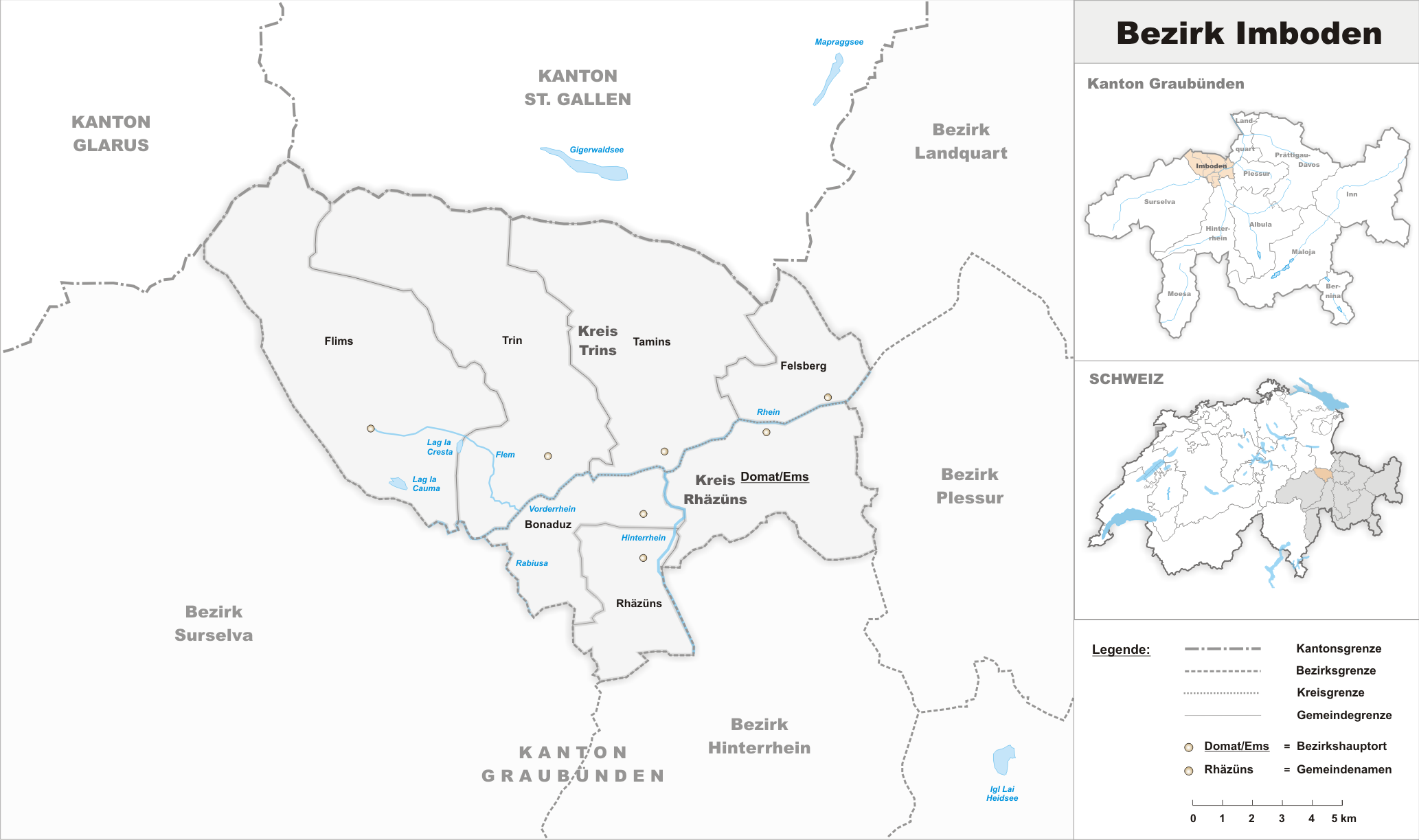
- Coordinates: 46.85°N 9.35°E
- Country: Switzerland
- Canton: Graubünden
- Capital: Domat/Ems

Area
  - Total: 203.81 km^{2} (78.69 sq mi)

Population (2020)
  - Total: 20,158
  - Density: 98.906/km^{2} (256.16/sq mi)
- Time zone: UTC+1 (CET)
  - Summer (DST): UTC+2 (CEST)
- Municipalities: 7

Imboden District (German: Bezirk Imboden, Romansh: District dal Plaun District dal Plaun) is a former administrative district in the canton of Graubünden, Switzerland. It had an area of 203.78 km^{2} (78.68 sq mi) and had a population of 20,158 in 2015. It was replaced with the Imboden Region on 1 January 2017 as part of a reorganization of the Canton.

It consisted of two Kreise (sub-districts) and seven municipalities:

Rhäzüns sub-district
Municipality	Population (31 December 2020)	Area (km^{2})
Bonaduz	3,468	14.45
Domat/Ems	8,161	24.24
Rhäzüns	1,611	13.28

Trins sub-district
Municipality	Population (31 December 2020)	Area (km^{2})
Felsberg	2,640	13.39
Flims	2,915	50.46
Tamins	1,226	40.71
Trin	1,479	47.25

== Languages ==
Languages of Imboden District, GR
Languages	Census 2000	
Languages	Number	Percent
German	13,498	80.1%
Romansh	1,447	8.6%
Italian	709	4.2%
TOTAL	16,859	100%
