= Bonaduz =

- Municipality
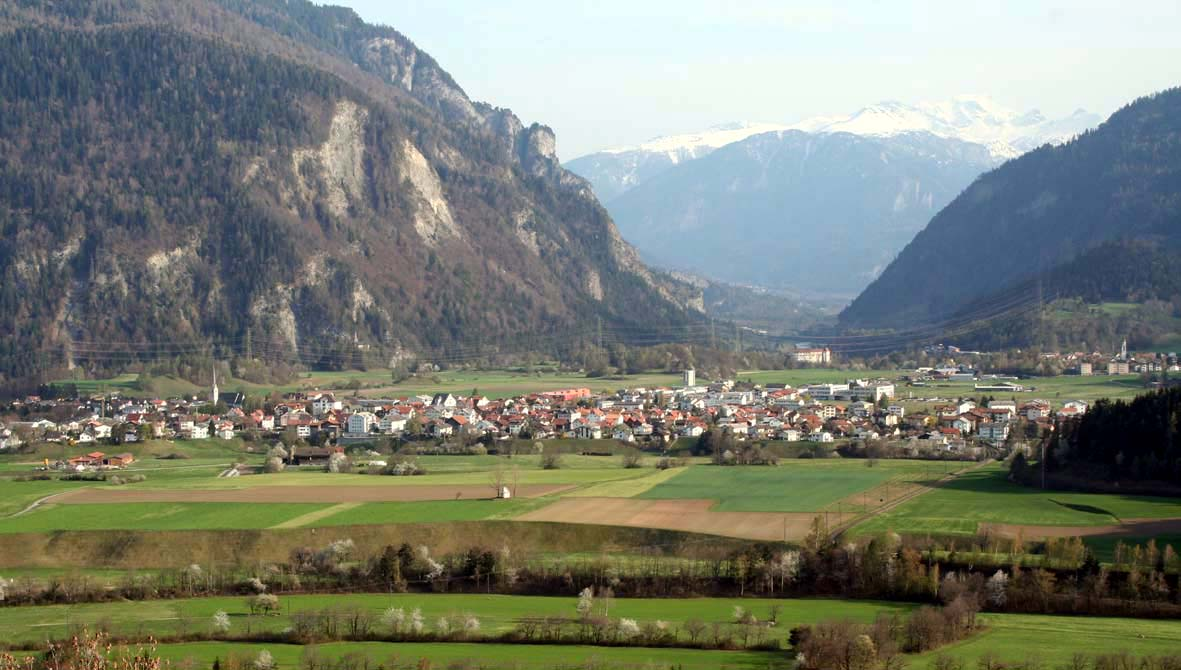
- Bonaduz village

- Flag Coat of arms
- Location of Bonaduz
- Location within Switzerland Location within Canton of Grisons
- Coordinates: 46°49′N 9°24′E
- Country: Switzerland
- Canton: Grisons
- District: Imboden

Area
  - Total: 14.45 km^{2} (5.58 sq mi)

Population (December 2015)
  - Total: 3,183
  - Density: 220.3/km^{2} (570.5/sq mi)
- Time zone: UTC+01:00 (CET)
  - Summer (DST): UTC+02:00 (CEST)
- Postal code: 7402
- SFOS number: 3721
- ISO 3166 code: CH-GR
- Surrounded by: Domat/Ems, Rhäzüns, Tamins, Trin, Versam
- Website: www.bonaduz.ch

Bonaduz (Romansh: Panaduz) is a municipality in the Imboden Region in the Swiss canton of the Grisons.

== History ==
Bonaduz is first mentioned in 960 as Beneduces. Until 1854, the German-speaking hamlet of Sculms belonged to Bonaduz. Following a vote in that year, Sculms joined Versam.

== Geography ==
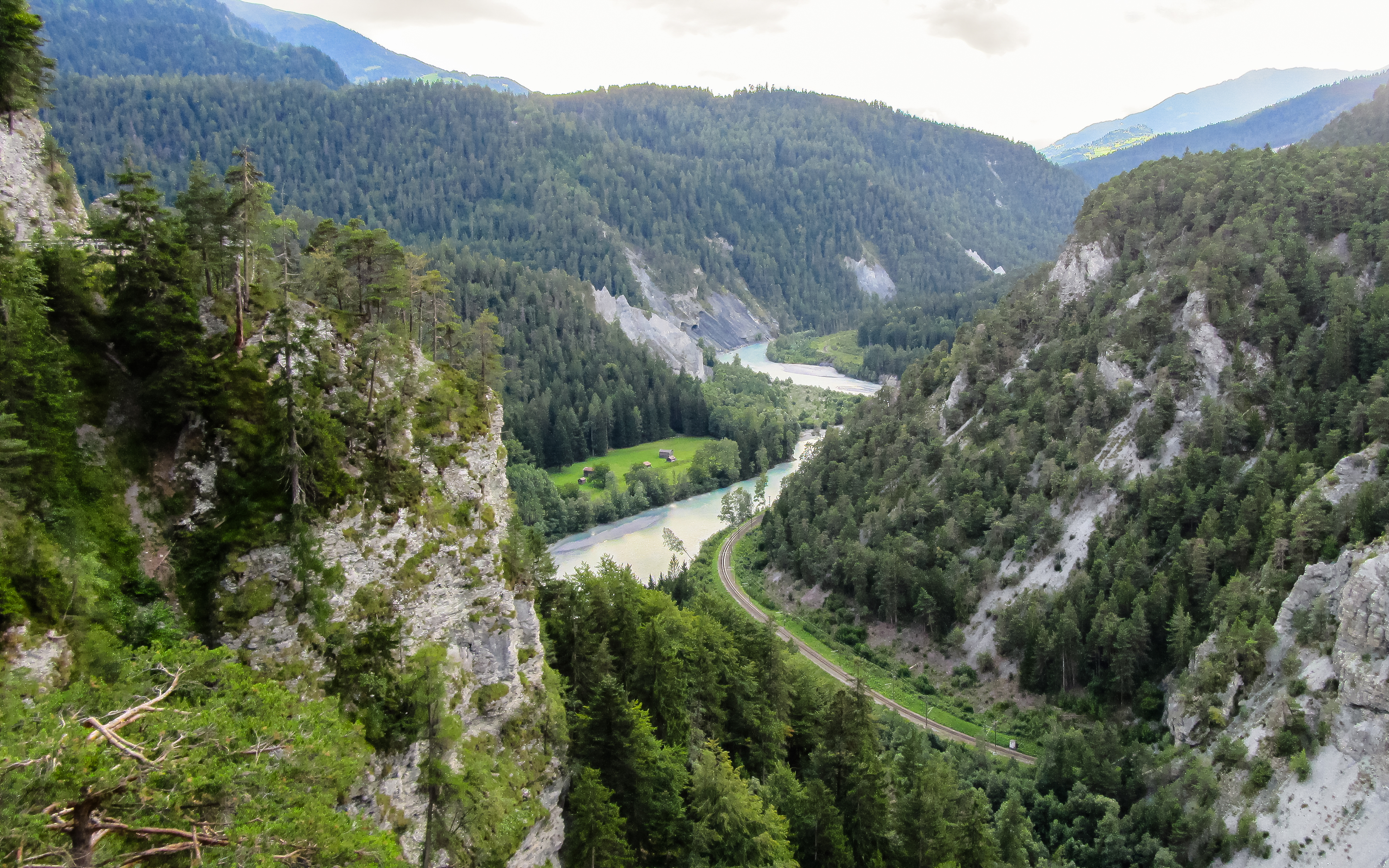
Vorderrhein and Ruinaulta as seen from Zault Observation Deck in Bonaduz

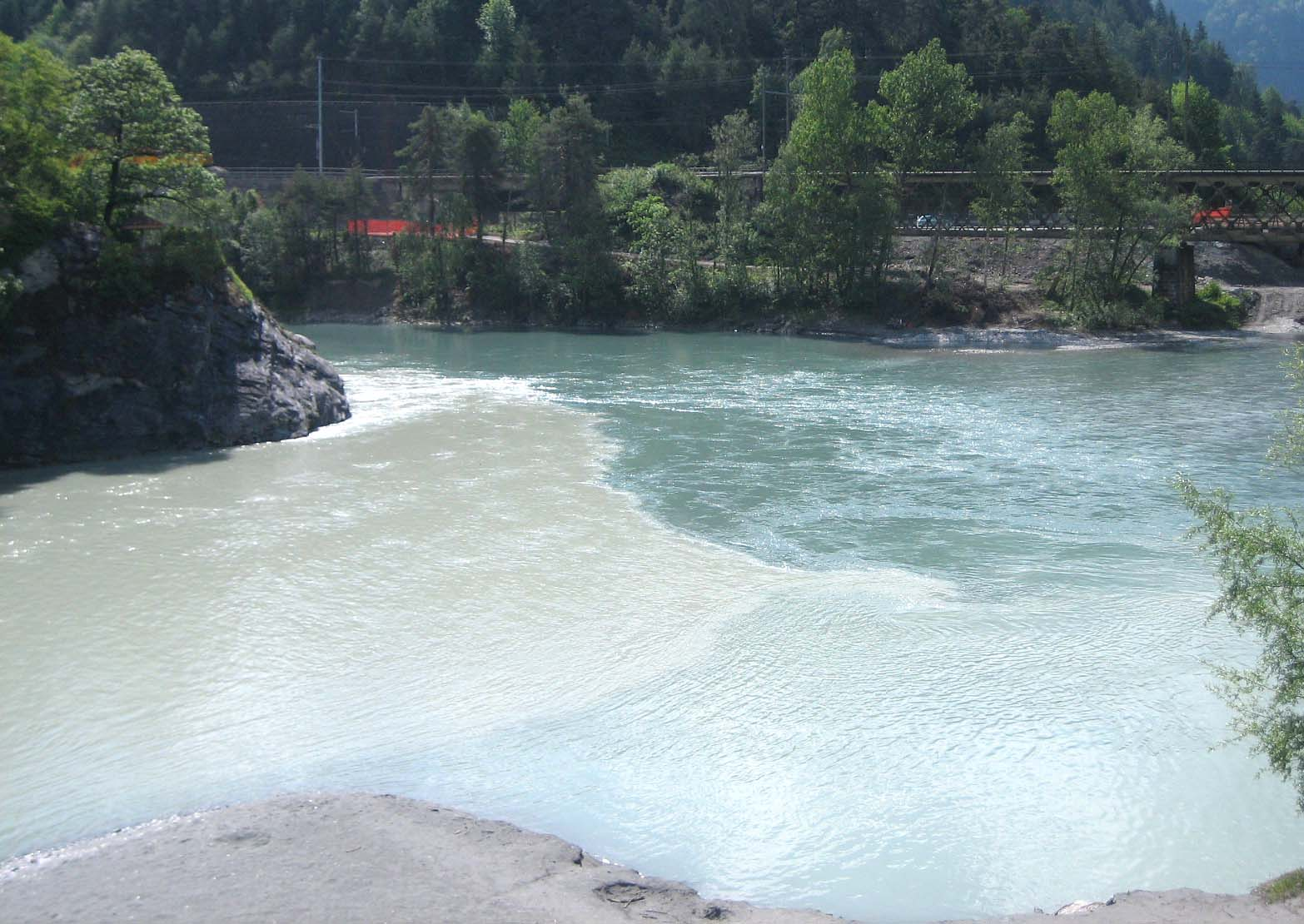
Confluence of the Rhein river near Reichenau.

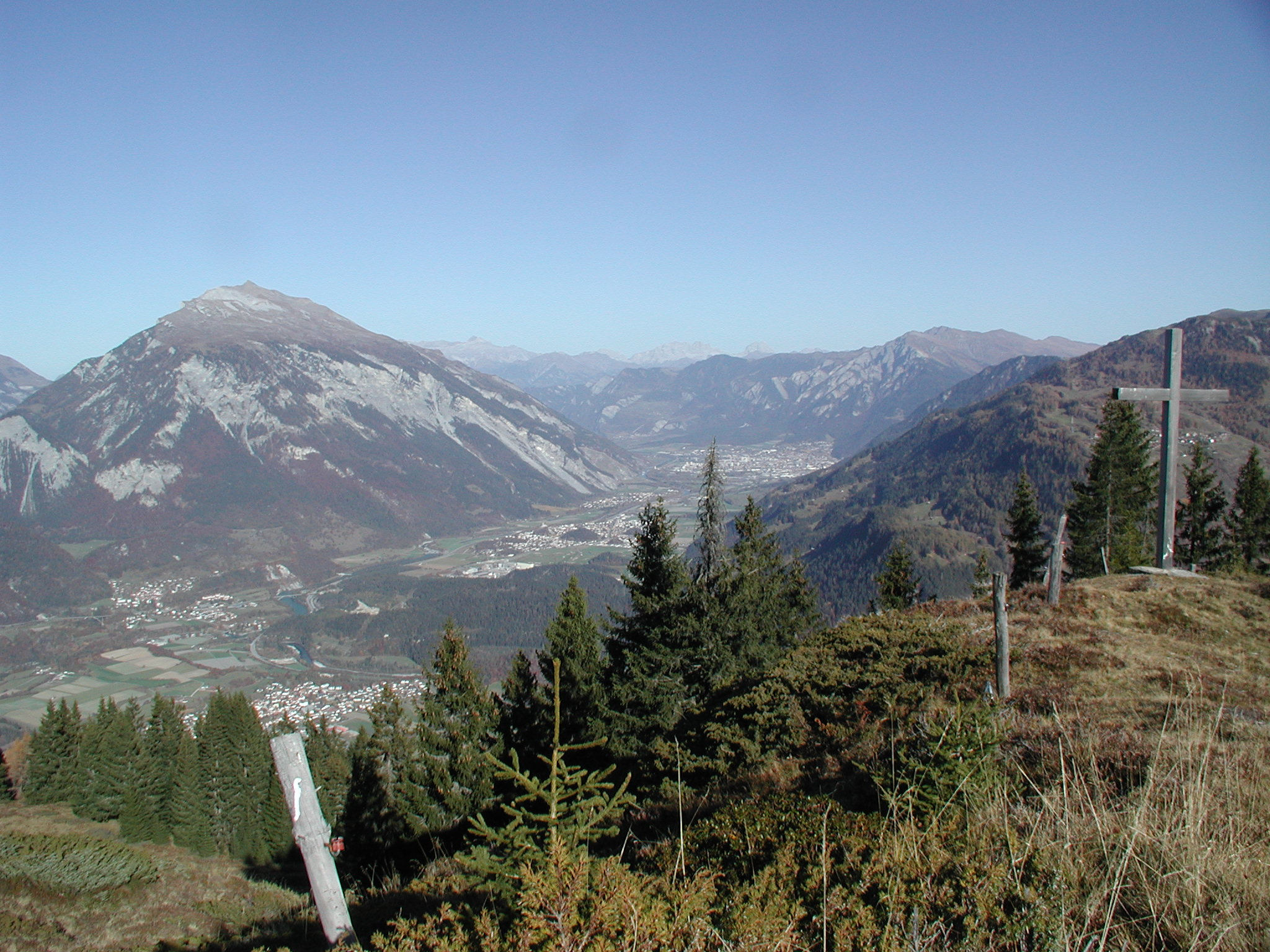
Upper Rhein valley, from Bonaduz to Chur.

Bonaduz has an area, as of 2006, of 14.5 km^{2} (5.6 sq mi). Of this area, 25.2% is used for agricultural purposes, while 61.3% is forested. Of the rest of the land, 7.3% is settled (buildings or roads) and the remainder (6.2%) is non-productive (rivers, glaciers or mountains).

Until 2017 the municipality was located in the Rhäzüns sub-district, of the Imboden district, after 2017 it became part of the Imboden Region. It consists of the haufendorf (an irregular, unplanned and quite closely packed village, built around a central square) of Bonaduz on a high plain south-west of the confluence of the Hinterrhein and Vorderrhein.

== Demographics ==
Aerial view from 300 m by Walter Mittelholzer (1923)

Bonaduz has a population (as of 31 December 2020) of 3,468. The historical population was as follows:

Year	Population
2020	3,468
2010	2,738
2000	2,433
1950	1,039
1900	886
1850	581

As of 2008, 10.8% of the population was made up of foreign nationals.

As of 2000, the gender distribution was 49.5% male and 50.5% female.

As of 2000, the age distribution was as follows:

Age group	Population	% of total
Children (0-9yrs)	373	15.3%
Pre-teen (10-14yrs)	162	6.7%
Teenagers (15-19yrs)	158	6.5%
Adults (20-29yrs)	219	9.0%
Adults (30-39yrs)	489	20.1%
Adults (40-49yrs)	394	16.2%
Adults (50-59yrs)	292	12.0%
Seniors (60-69yrs)	150	6.2%
Seniors (70-79yrs)	133	5.5%
Seniors (80-89yrs)	54	2.2%
Seniors (90-99yrs)	9	0.4%

=== Religions ===
As of 2000, most of the population is Roman Catholic (59.9%) or Swiss Reformed (26.9%). The other religious beliefs were as follows:

Religion	Population	% of Total
Roman Catholic	1,457	59.9%
Swiss Reformed	654	26.9%
Orthodox Christian	10	0.41%
Other Christian	47	1.93%
Islam	45	1.85%
Other religion	14	0.58%
No religion (agnostic or atheist)	120	4.93%
No answer	86	3.53%

=== Languages ===
As of 2000, most of the population speaks Swiss German (88.0%), with Romansh being second most common (5.4%), and Italian being third (2.1%).

Languages in Bonaduz
Languages	Census 1980		Census 1990		Census 2000	
Languages	Number	Percent	Number	Percent	Number	Percent
German	1186	79.12%	1620	85.81%	2140	87.96%
Romansh	166	11.07%	114	6.04%	131	5.38%
Italian	80	5.34%	39	2.07%	52	2.14%
Population	1499	100%	1888	100%	2433	100%

=== Education ===
In Bonaduz about 77.3% of the population (between age 25–64) have completed either non-mandatory upper secondary education or additional higher education (either university or a Fachhochschule).

=== Politics ===
In the 2007 federal election the most popular party was the CVP which received 32% of the vote. The next three most popular parties were the SVP (31.9%), the SPS (22.4%) and the FDP (12.3%).

== Economy ==
As of 2005, Bonaduz had an unemployment rate of 1.41%. Employment and businesses were organized as follows:

Sector	People Employed	Businesses Involved
Primary (raw materials)	32	11
Secondary (manufacturing)	555	26
Tertiary (service)	361	74

== Transportation ==
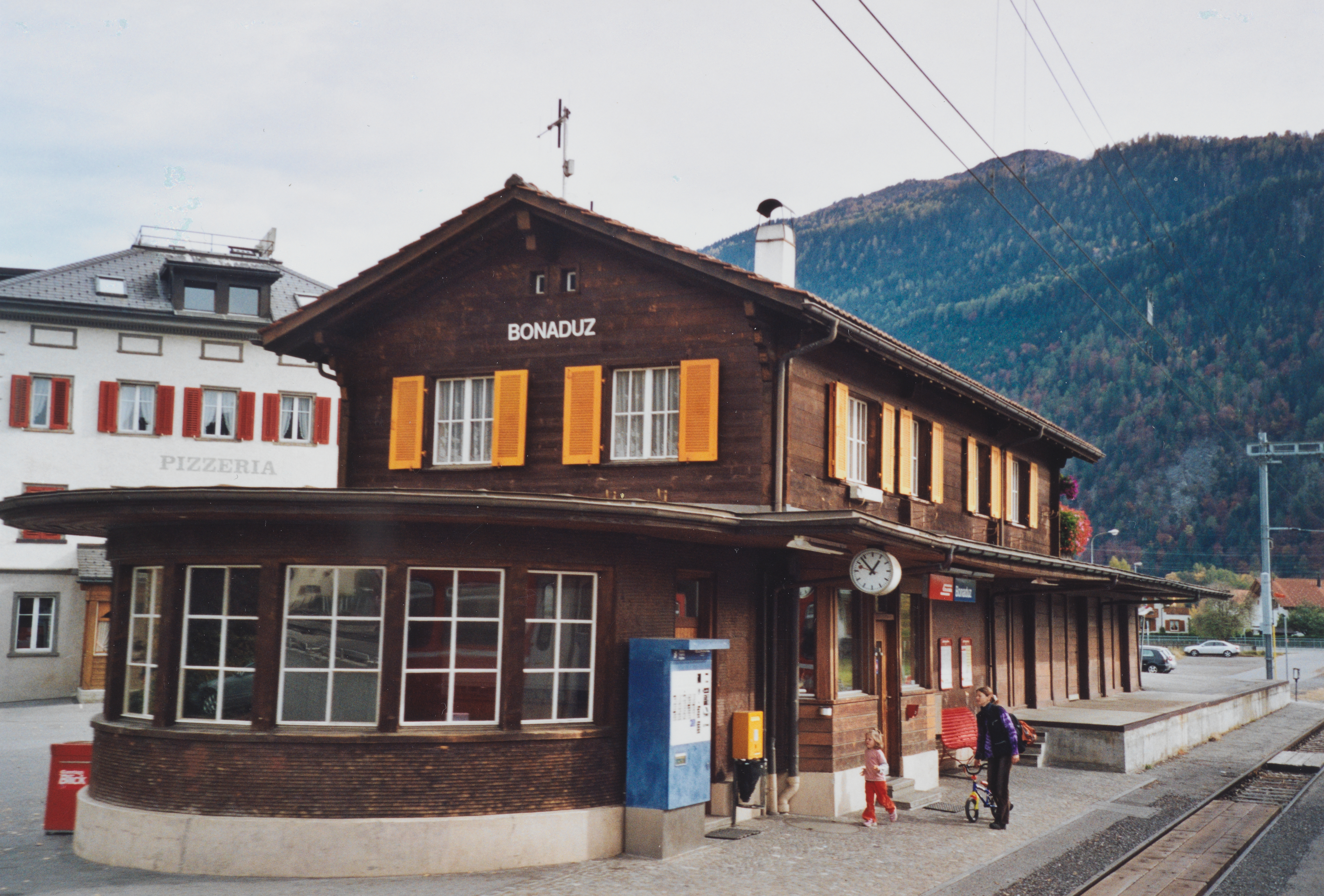
Bonaduz railway station

Rhaetian Railway operate services to Bonaduz (Rhaetian Railway station).
