= Reichenau, Switzerland =

Village in the Swiss Alps

Reichenau
- Village
- Location within Switzerland
- Coordinates: 46°49′29″N 9°24′32″E
- Country: Switzerland
- Canton: Graubünden
- municipality: Tamins
- Elevation: 604 m (1,982 ft)

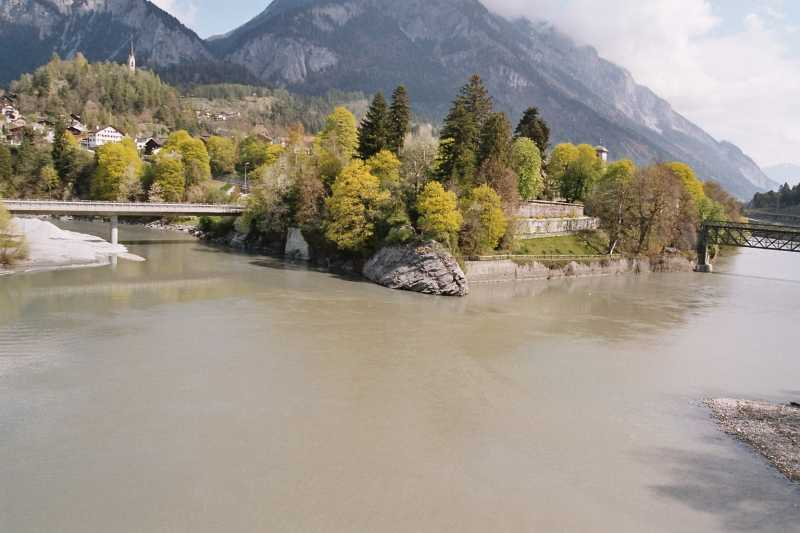
Confluence of Vorderrhein and Hinterrhein as seen from the train crossing Hinterrhein

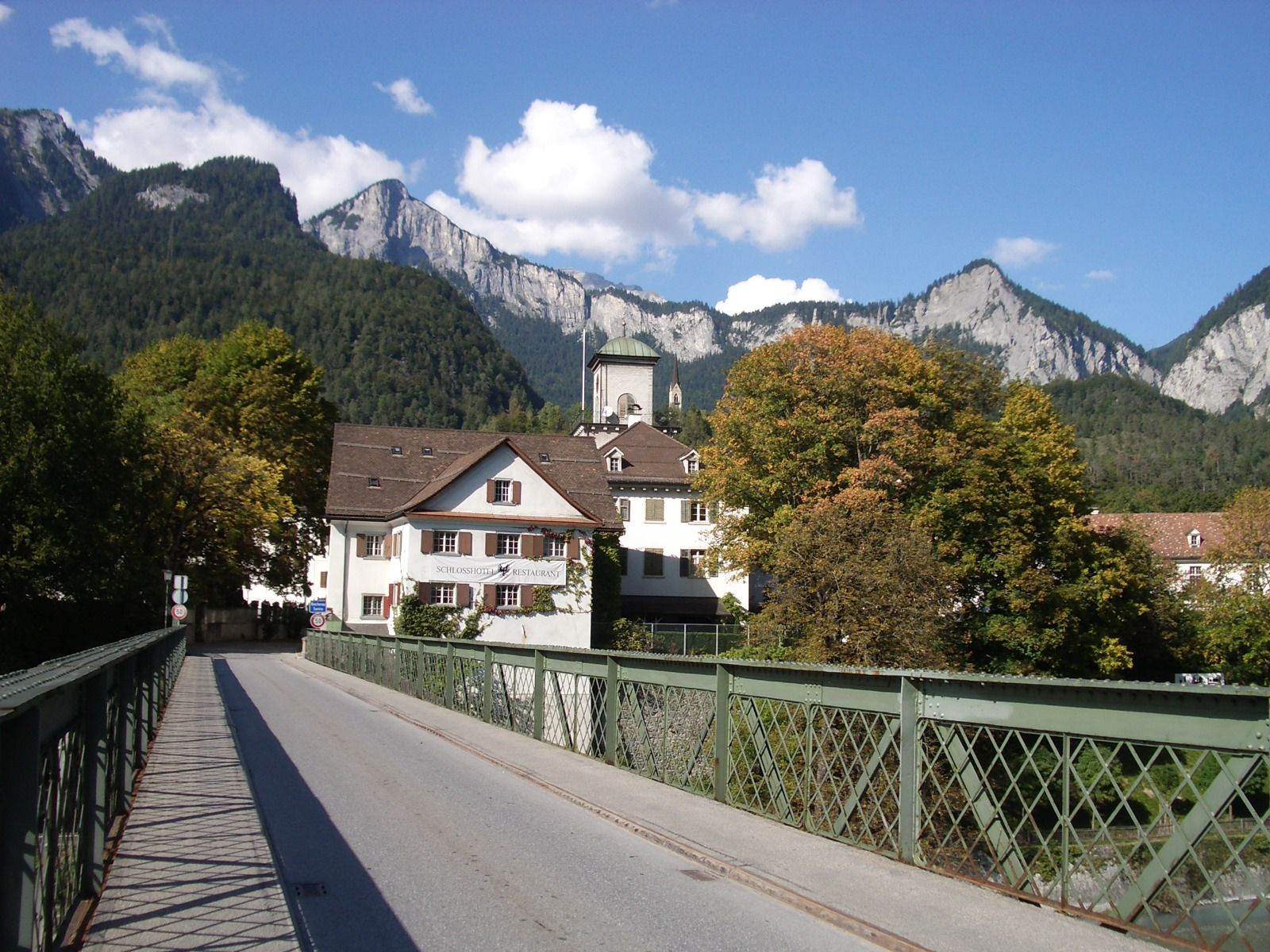
Reichenau castle

Aerial view (1947)

Reichenau (Swiss Standard German pronunciation: [ˈraɪçənaʊ]; Romansh: La Punt) is a village in the municipality of Tamins in the Canton of Graubünden, Switzerland, where the two Rhine tributaries Vorderrhein and Hinterrhein meet, forming the Alpine Rhine. It is a major traffic junction of the routes from Chur towards the Oberalp Pass and Lukmanier Pass and from Chur towards San Bernardino Pass and Julier Pass.

The civilisation of the place is traced back until the year 500. The name originates from the Benedictine Abbey of Reichenau on Reichenau Island in Lake Constance which owned properties in this area during the Middle Ages. The monastery was founded in 724 and drew to itself abbots with connections to the highest Carolingian and Ottonian society; it housed a school, and a famous scriptorium. See Abbey of Reichenau.

In the 14th century the first bridges were built over the Rhine tributaries.

A roadhouse was built in 1570 to collect the bridge toll. In the 17th century the first buildings for the sovereignty of Reichenau were built which became the castle of Reichenau. The Rhaetian Railway reached Reichenau in 1896.

== Transportation ==
Rhaetian Railway operate services to Reichenau-Tamins (Rhaetian Railway station) nearby.
