= Tamins =

- Municipality
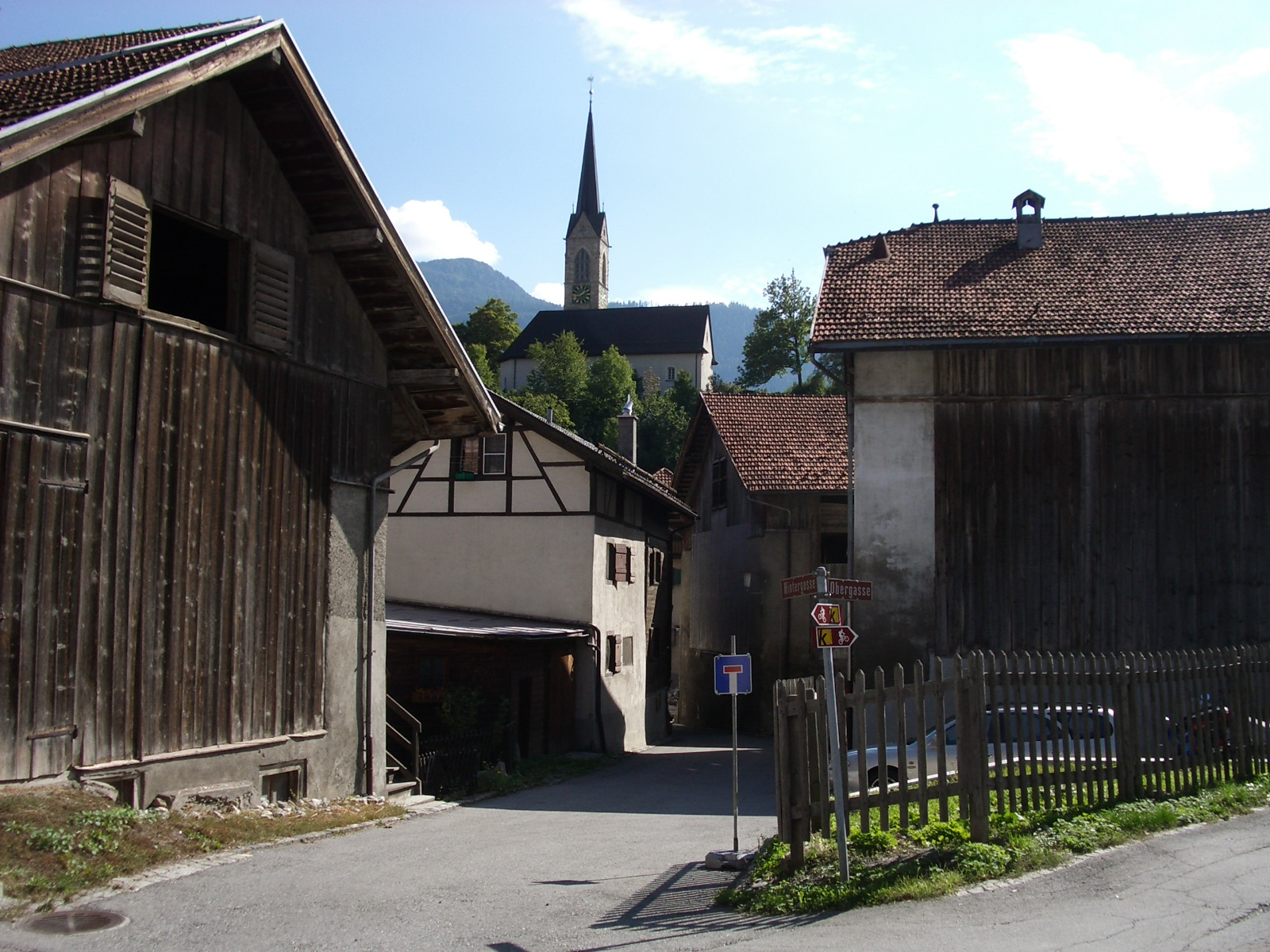

- Flag Coat of arms
- Location of Tamins
- Location within Switzerland Location within Canton of Grisons
- Coordinates: 46°49′48″N 9°24′25.5″E
- Country: Switzerland
- Canton: Grisons
- District: Imboden

Area
  - Total: 40.71 km^{2} (15.72 sq mi)
- Elevation (church): 693 m (2,274 ft)

Population (December 2020)
  - Total: 1,226
  - Density: 30.12/km^{2} (78.00/sq mi)
- Time zone: UTC+01:00 (CET)
  - Summer (DST): UTC+02:00 (CEST)
- Postal code: 7015
- SFOS number: 3733
- ISO 3166 code: CH-GR
- Localities: Tamins, Reichenau, Kunkels, Kunkelspass
- Surrounded by: Bonaduz, Domat/Ems, Felsberg, Pfäfers (SG), Trin
- Website: www.tamins.ch

Tamins (Romansh: Tumein) is a village and a municipality in the Imboden Region in the Swiss canton of Grisons.

== History ==
Tamins is first mentioned in 1224 as Tuminne. In 1225 it was mentioned as Tvminnis and in 1399 as Tumins.

== Geography ==
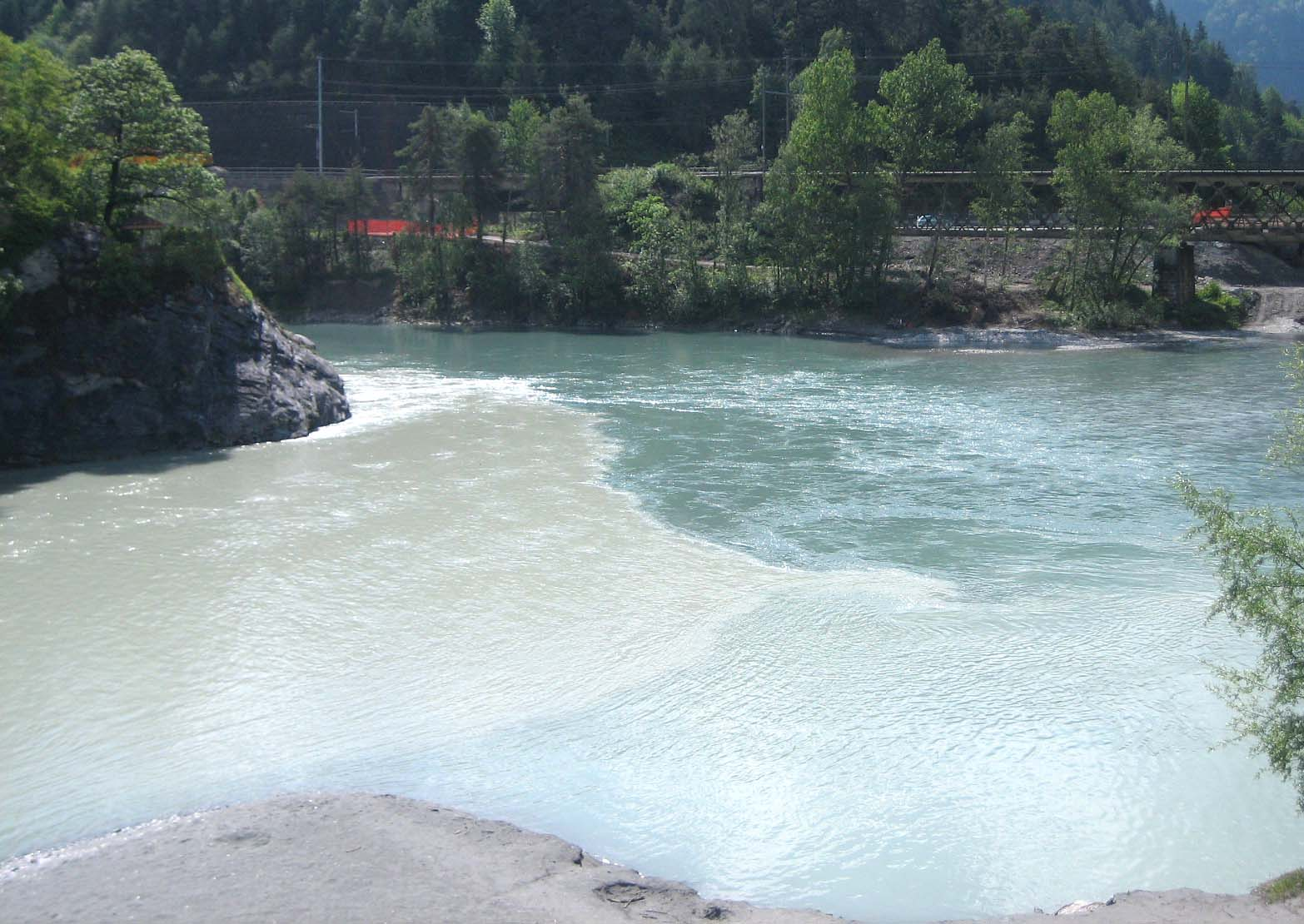
Confluence of Hinterrhein and Vorderrhein at Reichenau

Aerial view (1947)

Tamins has an area, as of 2006, of 40.7 km^{2} (15.7 sq mi). Of this area, 16.5% is used for agricultural purposes, while 50.1% is forested. Of the rest of the land, 1.4% is settled (buildings or roads) and the remainder (32%) is non-productive (rivers, glaciers or mountains).

Before 2017, the municipality was located in the Trins sub-district, of the Imboden district, after 2017 it was part of the Imboden Region. It is a small settlement north of the confluence of the Hinterrhein and Vorderrhein. It consists of the village of Tamins and since 1803 the village of Reichenau at the confluence of Hinterrhein and Vorderrhein and the Castle (Schloss) of Reichenau. is located in the municipality.

== Demographics ==
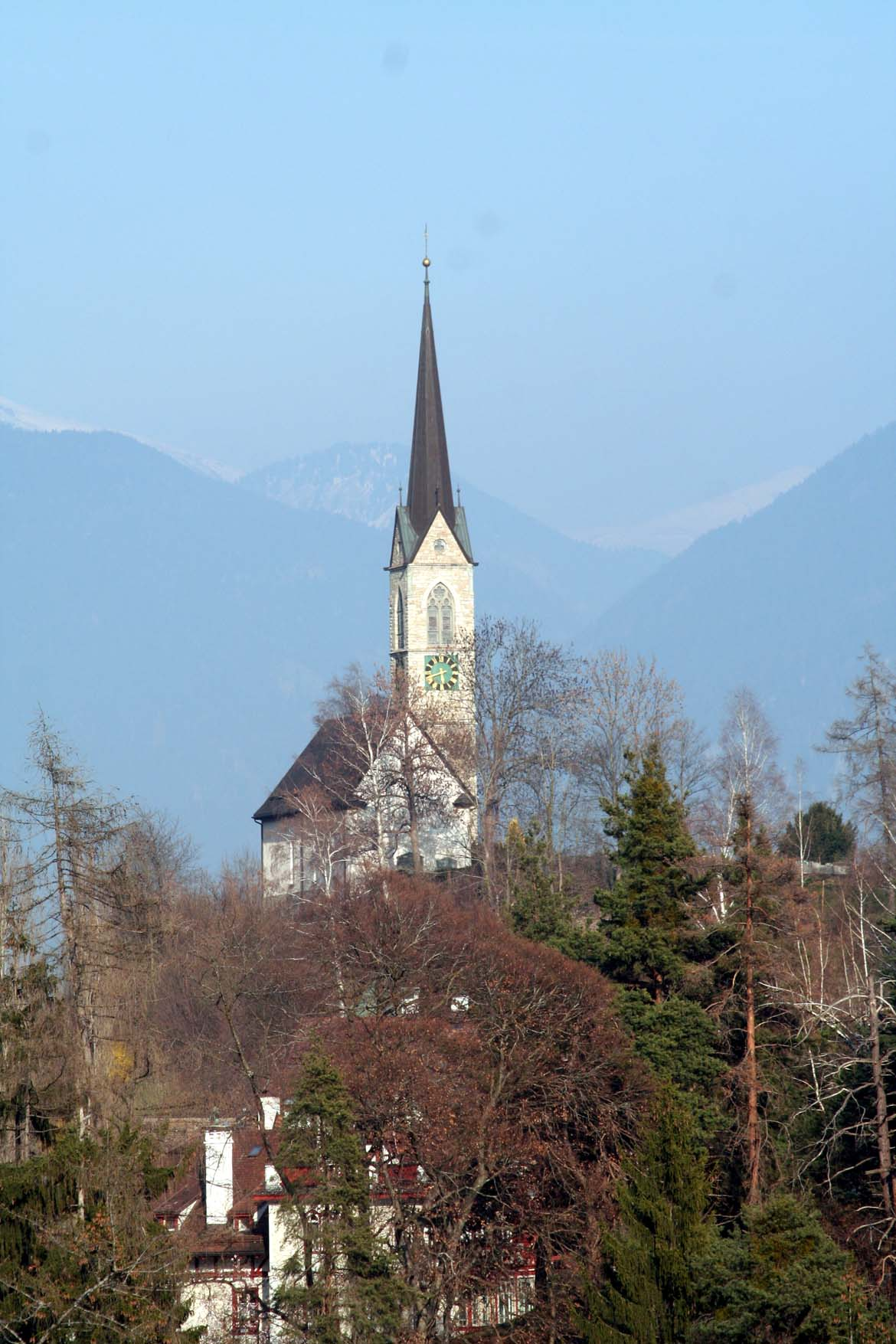
Church of Tamins

Tamins has a population (as of 31 December 2020) of 1,226. As of 2008, 13.0% of the population was made up of foreign nationals. Over the last 10 years the population has decreased at a rate of -5.5%.

As of 2000, the gender distribution of the population was 49.3% male and 50.7% female. The age distribution, as of 2000, in Tamins is; 129 people or 11.1% of the population are between 0 and 9 years old. 85 people or 7.3% are 10 to 14, and 67 people or 5.7% are 15 to 19. Of the adult population, 136 people or 11.7% of the population are between 20 and 29 years old. 179 people or 15.3% are 30 to 39, 217 people or 18.6% are 40 to 49, and 166 people or 14.2% are 50 to 59. The senior population distribution is 105 people or 9.0% of the population are between 60 and 69 years old, 55 people or 4.7% are 70 to 79, there are 27 people or 2.3% who are 80 to 89, and there is 1 person who is 90 to 99.

In the 2007 federal election the most popular party was the SVP which received 37.4% of the vote. The next three most popular parties were the SPS (31.1%), the FDP (21%) and the CVP (8.1%).

In Tamins about 78% of the population (between age 25-64) have completed either non-mandatory upper secondary education or additional higher education (either university or a Fachhochschule).

Tamins has an unemployment rate of 0.95%. As of 2005, there were 57 people employed in the primary economic sector and about 10 businesses involved in this sector. 61 people are employed in the secondary sector and there are 17 businesses in this sector. 93 people are employed in the tertiary sector, with 33 businesses in this sector.

From the 2000 census, 365 or 31.3% are Roman Catholic, while 633 or 54.2% belonged to the Swiss Reformed Church. Of the rest of the population, there are less than 5 individuals who belong to the Orthodox Church, and there are 18 individuals (or about 1.54% of the population) who belong to another Christian church. There are 30 (or about 2.57% of the population) who are Islamic. There are 10 individuals (or about 0.86% of the population) who belong to another church (not listed on the census), 84 (or about 7.20% of the population) belong to no church, are agnostic or atheist, and 27 individuals (or about 2.31% of the population) did not answer the question.

The historical population is given in the following table:

year	population
1850	770
1888	585
1900	863
1930	618
1950	781
2000	1,167

== Languages ==
Most of the population (as of 2000) speaks German (88.4%), with Romansh being second most common ( 3.5%) and Italian being third ( 2.8%).

Languages in Tamins
Languages	Census 1980		Census 1990		Census 2000	
Languages	Number	Percent	Number	Percent	Number	Percent
German	795	84.04%	962	86.51%	1032	88.43%
Romanish	67	7.08%	62	5.58%	41	3.51%
Italian	59	6.24%	42	3.78%	33	2.83%
Population	946	100%	1112	100%	1167	100%

== Weather ==
Tamins has an average of 122.6 days of rain per year and on average receives 1,115 mm (43.9 in) of precipitation. The wettest month is August during which time Tamins receives an average of 124 mm (4.9 in) of precipitation. During this month there is precipitation for an average of 12.6 days. The driest month of the year is October with an average of 70 mm (2.8 in) of precipitation over 12.6 days.

== Transportation ==
Rhaetian Railway operate services to Reichenau-Tamins (Rhaetian Railway station) nearby.
