= Trin =

- Municipality
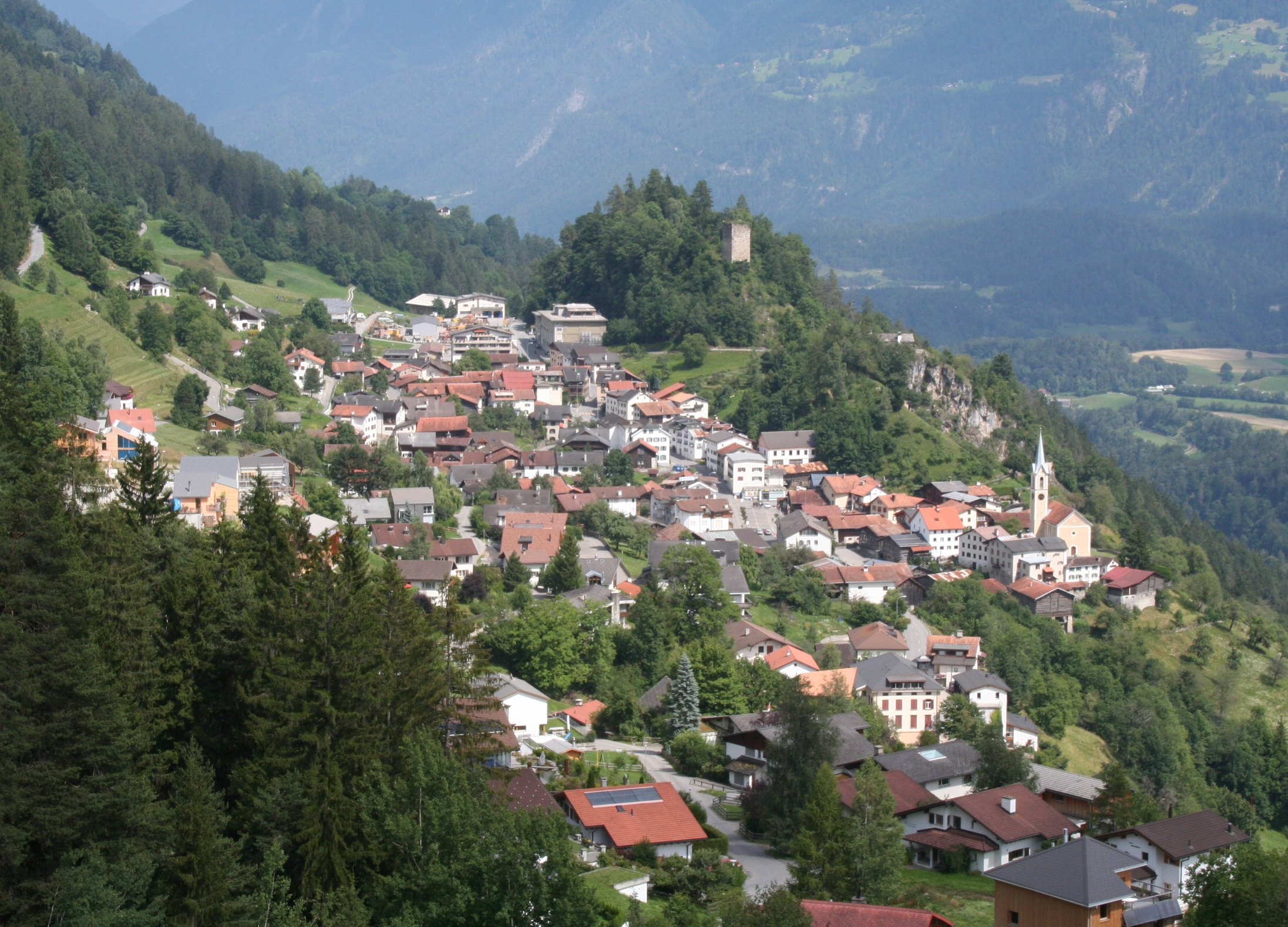

- Flag Coat of arms
- Location of Trin
- Location within Switzerland Location within Canton of Grisons
- Coordinates: 46°49′N 9°21′E
- Country: Switzerland
- Canton: Grisons
- District: Imboden

Area
  - Total: 47.25 km^{2} (18.24 sq mi)
- Elevation: 876 m (2,874 ft)

Population (December 2020)
  - Total: 1,479
  - Density: 31.30/km^{2} (81.07/sq mi)
- Time zone: UTC+01:00 (CET)
  - Summer (DST): UTC+02:00 (CEST)
- Postal code: 7014,7016
- SFOS number: 3734
- ISO 3166 code: CH-GR
- Surrounded by: Bonaduz, Flims, Pfäfers (SG), Tamins, Versam
- Website: www.trin.ch

Trin is a municipality in the Imboden Region in the Swiss canton of the Grisons. Crestasee is located in Trin.

== History ==
Trin is first mentioned in the 12th century as Turunnio.

== Geography ==
Aerial view from 800 m by Walter Mittelholzer (1923)

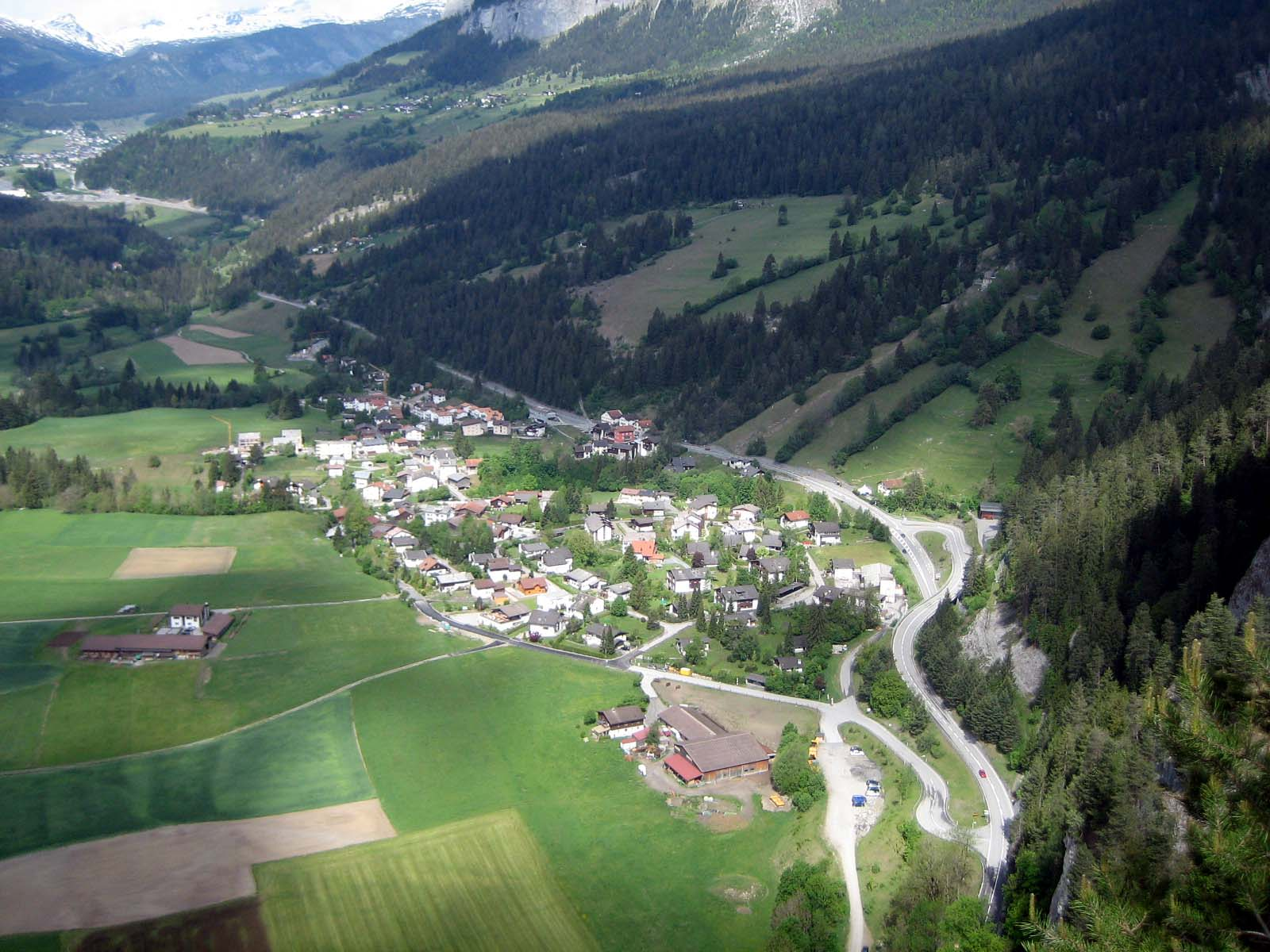
Village of Mulin in the Trin municipality

Trin is perched on the mountain-side above the Rhine valley on the road between Domat/Ems and Flims. The village of Mulin (also in the municipality) is at the foot of the slope on the edge of the valley.

Trin has an area, as of 2006, of 47.2 km^{2} (18.2 sq mi). Of this area, 33.2% is used for agricultural purposes, while 24.3% is forested. Of the rest of the land, 1.7% is settled (buildings or roads) and the remainder (40.8%) is non-productive (rivers, glaciers or mountains).

Before 2017, the municipality was located in the Trins sub-district of the Imboden district, after 2017 it was part of the Imboden Region. It consists of the villages of Trin, Digg and Mulin. Until 1943 Trin was known as Trins.

== Demographics ==
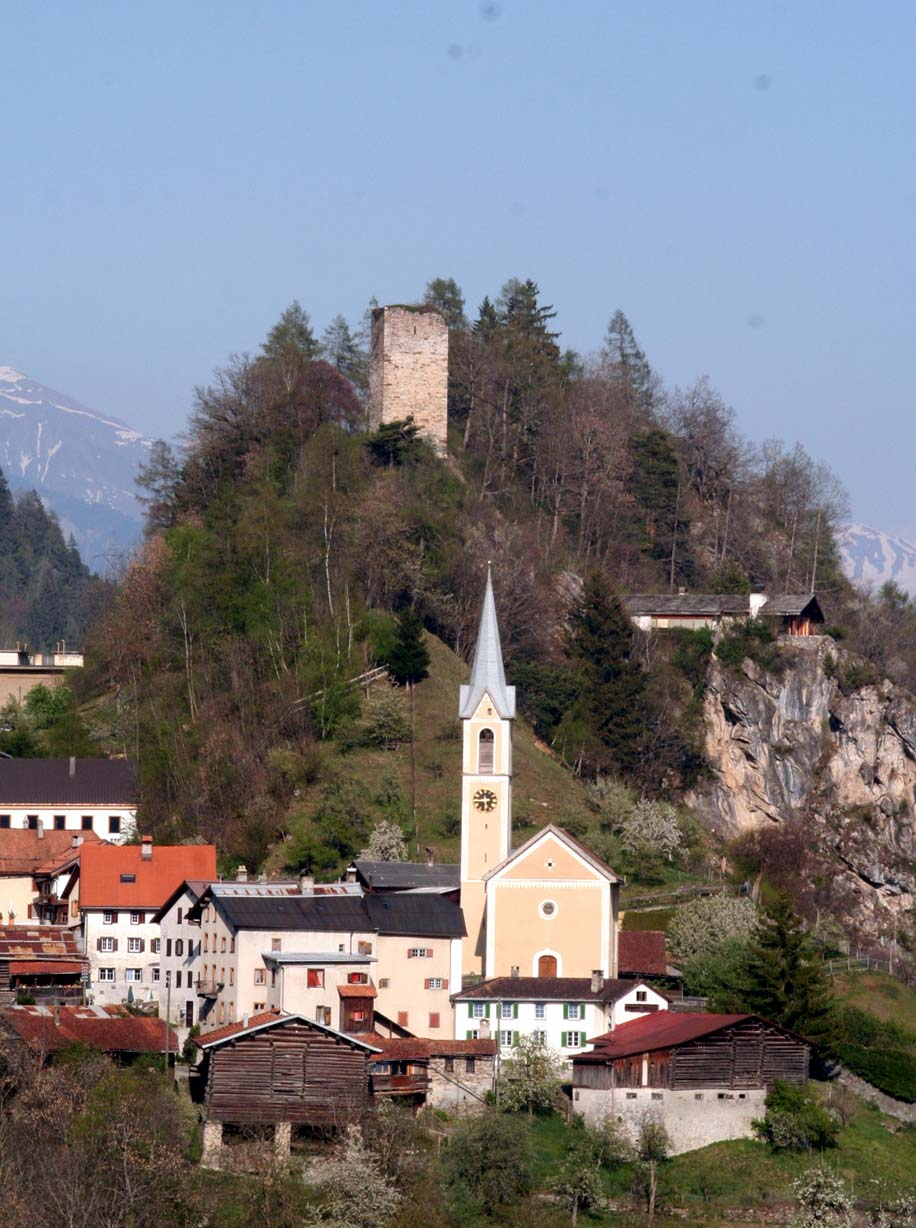
Trin village church and Castle Canaschal

Trin has a population (as of 31 December 2020) of 1,479. As of 2008, 11.6% of the population was made up of foreign nationals. Over the last 10 years the population has grown at a rate of 2.1%.

As of 2000, the gender distribution of the population was 50.4% male and 49.6% female. The age distribution, as of 2000, in Trin is; 134 people or 12.1% of the population are between 0 and 9 years old. 74 people or 6.7% are 10 to 14, and 71 people or 6.4% are 15 to 19. Of the adult population, 97 people or 8.8% of the population are between 20 and 29 years old. 179 people or 16.2% are 30 to 39, 187 people or 16.9% are 40 to 49, and 160 people or 14.4% are 50 to 59. The senior population distribution is 97 people or 8.8% of the population are between 60 and 69 years old, 63 people or 5.7% are 70 to 79, there are 38 people or 3.4% who are 80 to 89, and there are 8 people or 0.7% who are 90 to 99.

In the 2007 federal election the most popular party was the FDP which received 36.4% of the vote. The next three most popular parties were the SVP (27.8%), the SPS (27.2%) and the CVP (7.7%).

In Trin about 71.3% of the population (between age 25 and 64) have completed either non-mandatory upper secondary education or additional higher education (either university or a Fachhochschule).

Trin has an unemployment rate of 1.62%. As of 2005, there were 47 people employed in the primary economic sector and about 18 businesses involved in this sector. 120 people are employed in the secondary sector and there are 13 businesses in this sector. 87 people are employed in the tertiary sector, with 32 businesses in this sector.

From the 2000 census, 251 or 22.7% are Roman Catholic, while 624 or 56.3% belonged to the Swiss Reformed Church. Of the rest of the population, there are 12 individuals (or about 1.08% of the population) who belong to the Orthodox Church, and there are 23 individuals (or about 2.08% of the population) who belong to another Christian church. There are 9 (or about 0.81% of the population) who are Islamic. There are 6 individuals (or about 0.54% of the population) who belong to another church (not listed on the census), 84 (or about 7.58% of the population) belong to no church, are agnostic or atheist, and 99 individuals (or about 8.94% of the population) did not answer the question.

The historical population is given in the following table:

Year	Population
1803	686
1850	919
1900	755
1930	655
1950	695
1990	922
2000	1,108

== Languages ==
Most of the population (as of 2000) speaks German (72.7%), with Romansh being second most common (19.8%) and Italian being third ( 3.0%).

Languages in Trin
Languages	Census 1980		Census 1990		Census 2000	
Languages	Number	Percent	Number	Percent	Number	Percent
German	340	40.96%	566	61.39%	806	72.74%
Romansh	379	45.66%	270	29.28%	219	19.77%
Italian	59	7.11%	23	2.49%	33	2.98%
Population	830	100%	922	100%	1108	100%

== Heritage sites of national significance ==
The Crap Sogn Parcazi, a ruined castle and fortified church is listed as a Swiss heritage site of national significance.

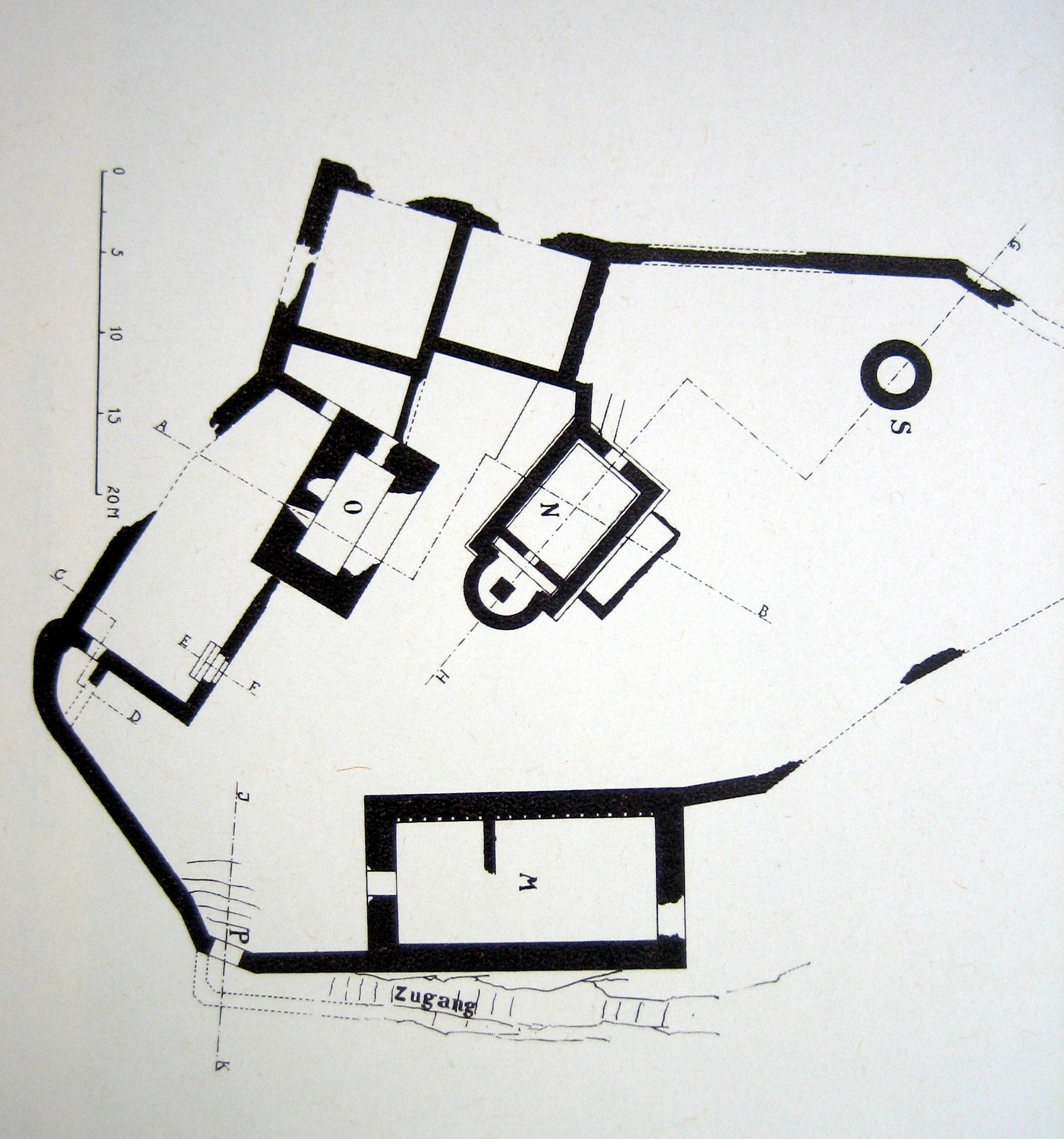
Floorplan of the castle

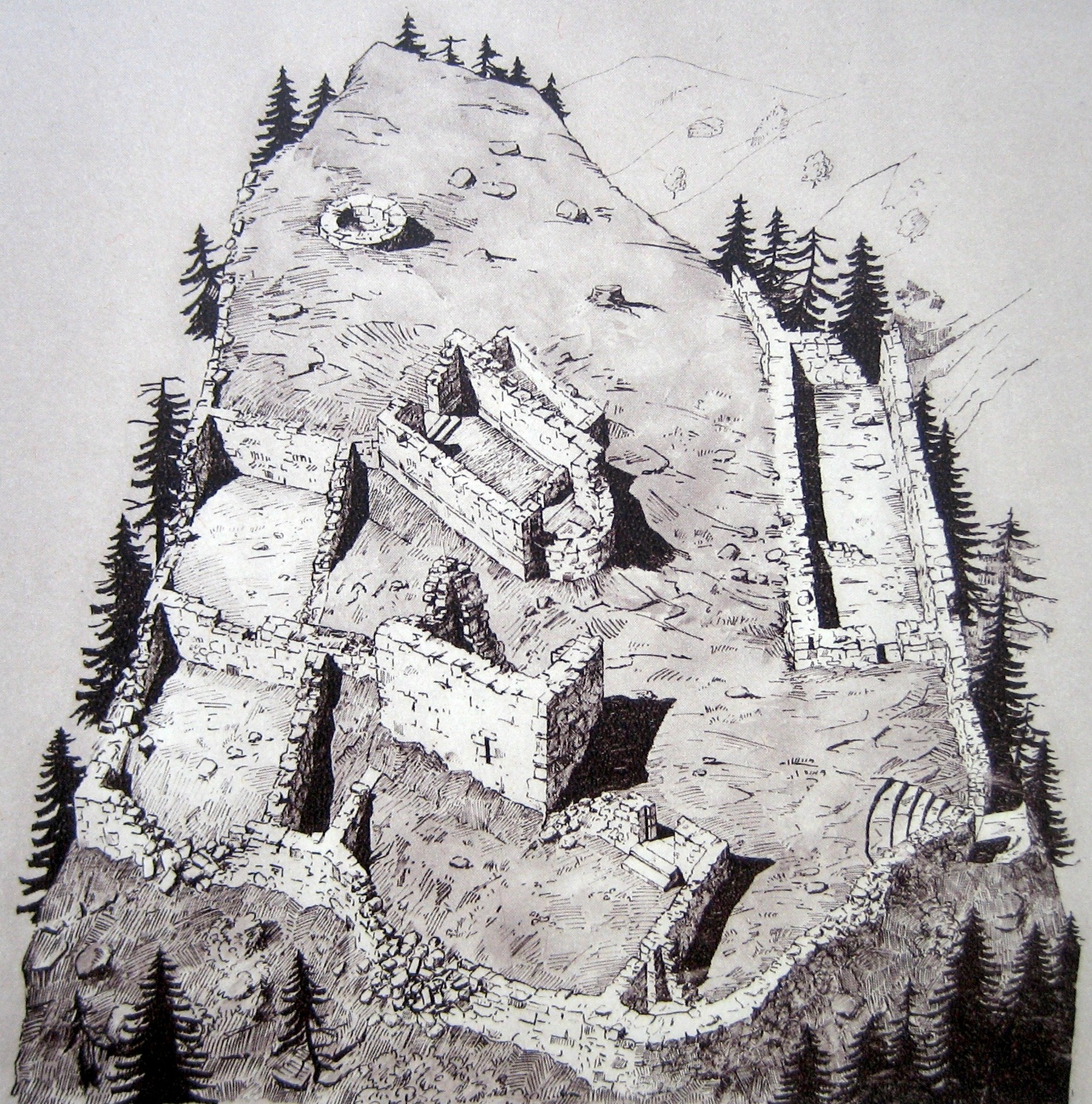
Sketch of the castle, with the church in the center

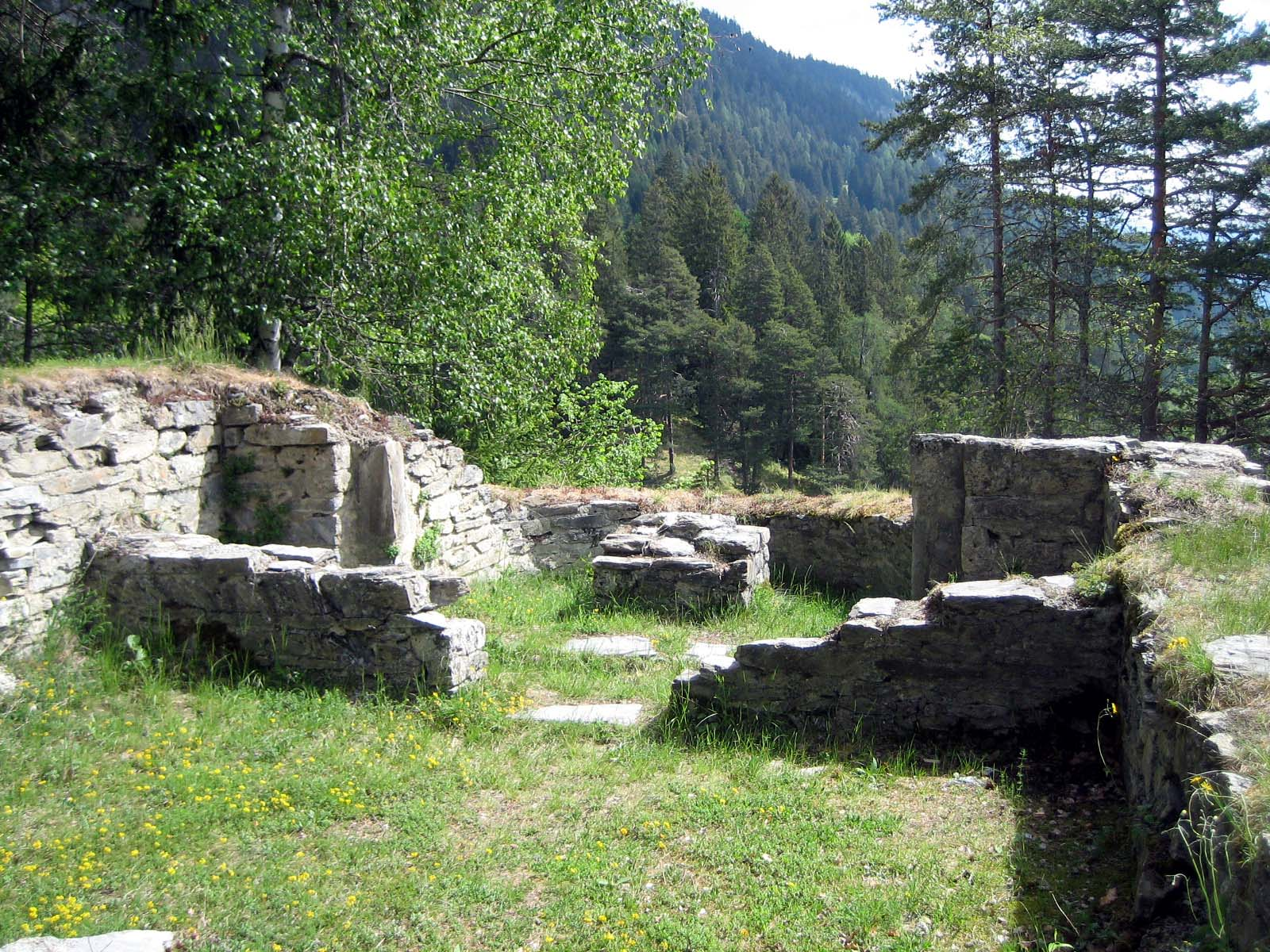
Ruins of the church

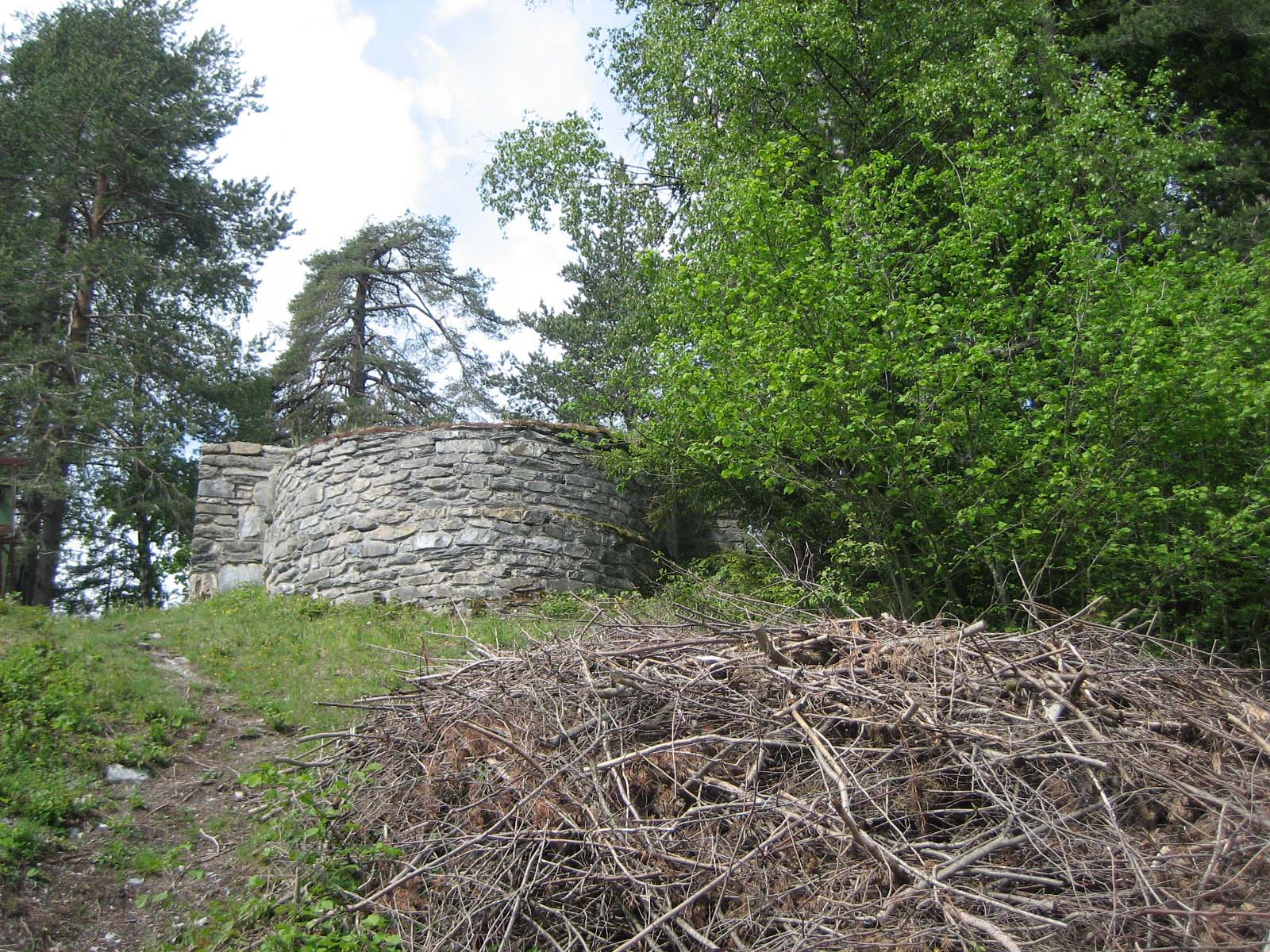
Apse of the church

== Transportation ==
The municipality has a railway station, Trin, on the Reichenau-Tamins–Disentis/Mustér line. It has regular service to Disentis/Mustér and Scuol-Tarasp.
