= Felsberg, Switzerland =

Felsberg
- Municipality
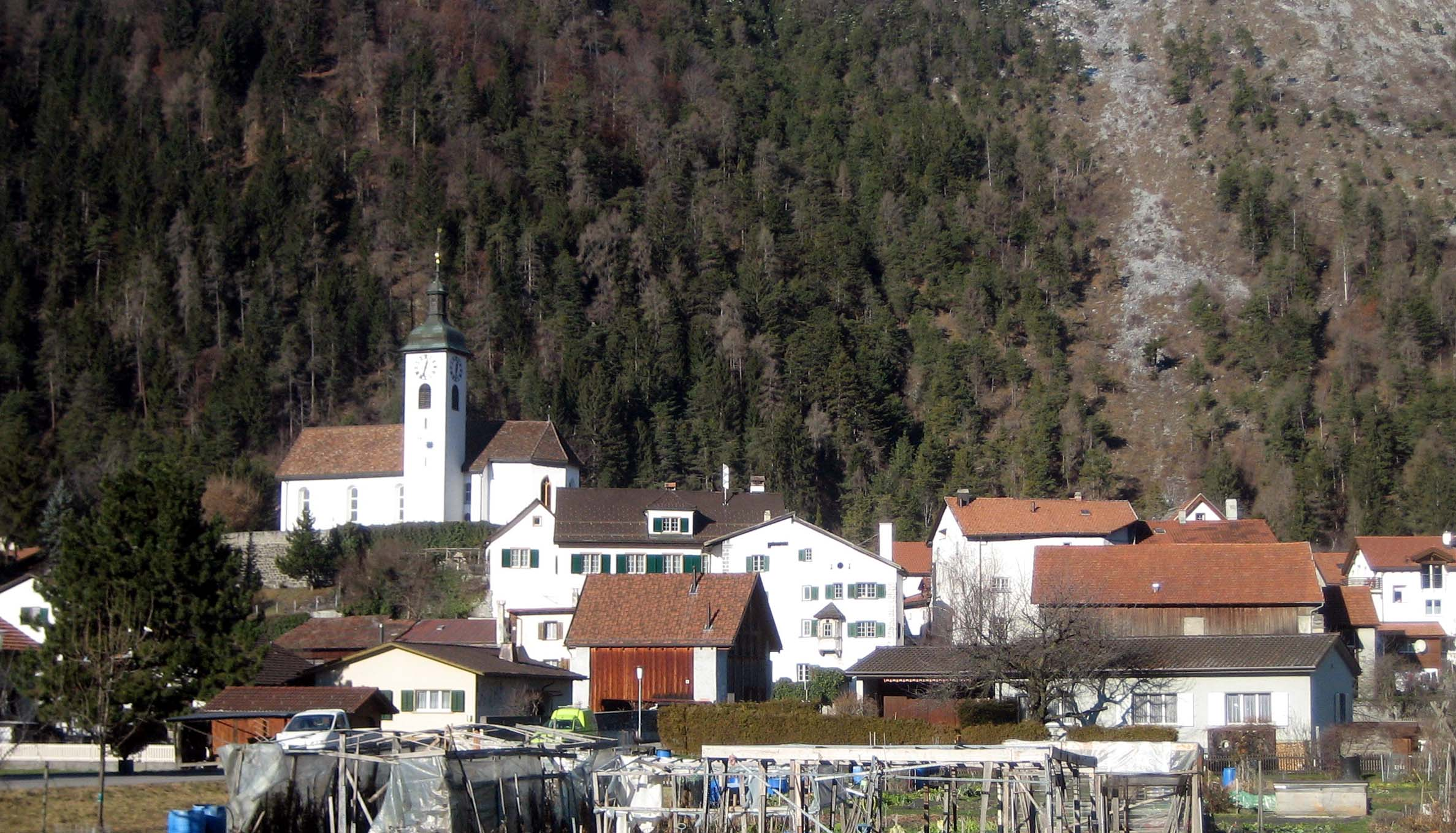

- Flag Coat of arms
- Location of Felsberg
- Location within Switzerland Location within Canton of Grisons
- Coordinates: 46°50′N 9°28′E
- Country: Switzerland
- Canton: Grisons
- District: Imboden

Area
  - Total: 13.4 km^{2} (5.2 sq mi)
- Elevation: 572 m (1,877 ft)

Population (December 2020)
  - Total: 2,640
  - Density: 197/km^{2} (510/sq mi)
- Time zone: UTC+01:00 (CET)
  - Summer (DST): UTC+02:00 (CEST)
- Postal code: 7012
- SFOS number: 3731
- ISO 3166 code: CH-GR
- Surrounded by: Chur, Domat/Ems, Haldenstein, Pfäfers (SG), Tamins
- Twin towns: Felsberg (Germany)
- Website: www.felsberg.ch

Felsberg (Swiss Standard German pronunciation: [ˈfɛlsˌbɛrɡ]; Romansh: Favugn) is a municipality in the Imboden Region in the Swiss canton of the Grisons.

== History ==
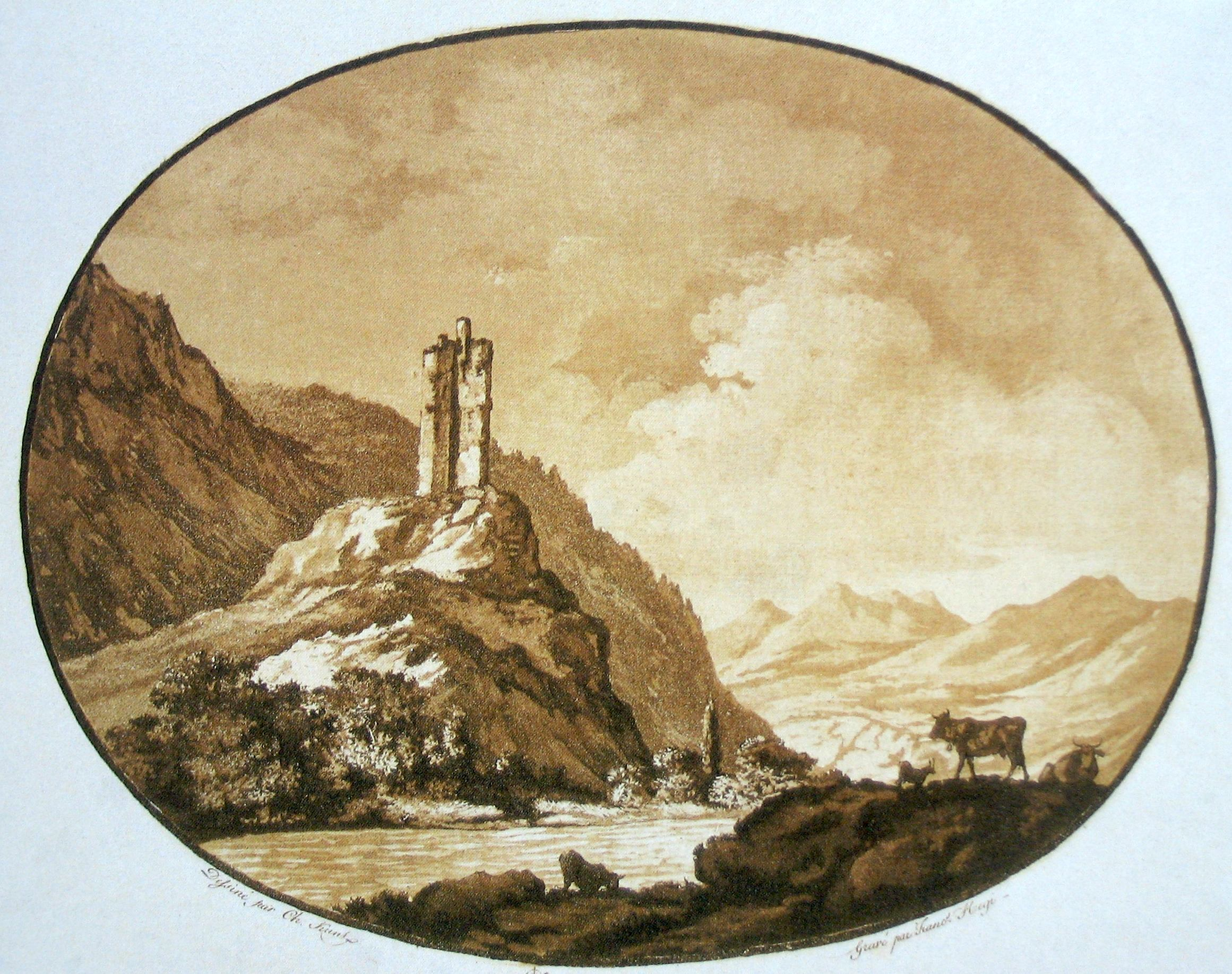
Ruins of Felsberg castle, today no longer visible

Aerial view from 400 m by Walter Mittelholzer (1923)

Felsberg is first mentioned about 840 as in villa Fagonio. In 1290 it was mentioned, in German, as veltsperch.

== Geography ==
Felsberg has an area, as of 2006, of 13.4 km^{2} (5.2 sq mi). Of this area, 20.2% is used for agricultural purposes, while 43.6% is forested. Of the rest of the land, 4.3% is settled (buildings or roads) and the remainder (31.9%) is non-productive (rivers, glaciers or mountains).

Before 2017, the municipality was located in the Trin sub-district of the Imboden district, it is in a small valley north of the Rhine and between Chur and Domat/Ems.

== Demographics ==
Felsberg has a population (as of 31 December 2020) of 2,640. As of 2007, 8.6% of the population was made up of foreign nationals. Over the last 10 years the population has grown at a rate of 3.2%.

As of 2000, the gender distribution of the population was 50.7% male and 49.3% female. The age distribution, as of 2000, in Felsberg is; 256 people or 12.6% of the population are between 0 and 9 years old. 176 people or 8.7% are 10 to 14, and 155 people or 7.6% are 15 to 19. Of the adult population, 253 people or 12.5% of the population are between 20 and 29 years old. 336 people or 16.6% are 30 to 39, 319 people or 15.7% are 40 to 49, and 240 people or 11.8% are 50 to 59. The senior population distribution is 129 people or 6.4% of the population are between 60 and 69 years old, 107 people or 5.3% are 70 to 79, there are 49 people or 2.4% who are 80 to 89, there are 8 people or 0.4% who are 90 to 99, and 1 person or 0.0% who is 100 or more.

In the 2007 federal election the most popular party was the SVP which received 42.9% of the vote. The next three most popular parties were the SPS (24.8%), the FDP (19.1%) and the CVP (10.9%).

The entire Swiss population is generally well educated. In Felsberg about 81.7% of the population (between age 25–64) have completed either non-mandatory upper secondary education or additional higher education (either university or a Fachhochschule).

Felsberg has an unemployment rate of 0.79%. As of 2005, there were 36 people employed in the primary economic sector and about 12 businesses involved in this sector. 143 people are employed in the secondary sector and there are 25 businesses in this sector. 147 people are employed in the tertiary sector, with 39 businesses in this sector.

From the 2000 census, 535 or 26.4% are Roman Catholic, while 1,304 or 64.3% belonged to the Swiss Reformed Church. Of the rest of the population, there are 11 individuals (or about 0.54% of the population) who belong to the Orthodox Church, and there are 11 individuals (or about 0.54% of the population) who belong to another Christian church. There are 57 (or about 2.81% of the population) who are Islamic. There are 11 individuals (or about 0.54% of the population) who belong to another church (not listed on the census), 78 (or about 3.84% of the population) belong to no church, are agnostic or atheist, and 22 individuals (or about 1.08% of the population) did not answer the question.

The historical population is given in the following table:

| year | population |
|---|---|
| 1850 | 482 |
| 1900 | 647 |
| 1950 | 939 |
| 1980 | 1,369 |
| 1990 | 1,772 |
| 2000 | 2,029 |

== Languages ==
Most of the population (as of 2000) speaks German (91.6%), with Romansh being second most common ( 3.0%) and Albanian being third ( 1.2%).

Sprachen in FelsbeLanguages
| Languages | Census 1980 | | Census 1990 | | Census 2000 | |
| Languages | Number | Percent | Number | Percent | Number | Percent |
|---|---|---|---|---|---|---|
| German | 1183 | 86.41% | 1599 | 90.23% | 1859 | 91.62% |
| Romansh | 86 | 6.28% | 71 | 4.01% | 60 | 2.96% |
| Italian | 59 | 4.31% | 22 | 1.24% | 20 | 0.99% |
| Population | 1369 | 100% | 1772 | 100% | 2029 | 100% |

== Transportation ==
Rhaetian Railway operates services to Felsberg (Rhaetian Railway station).
