= Rhäzüns =

- Municipality
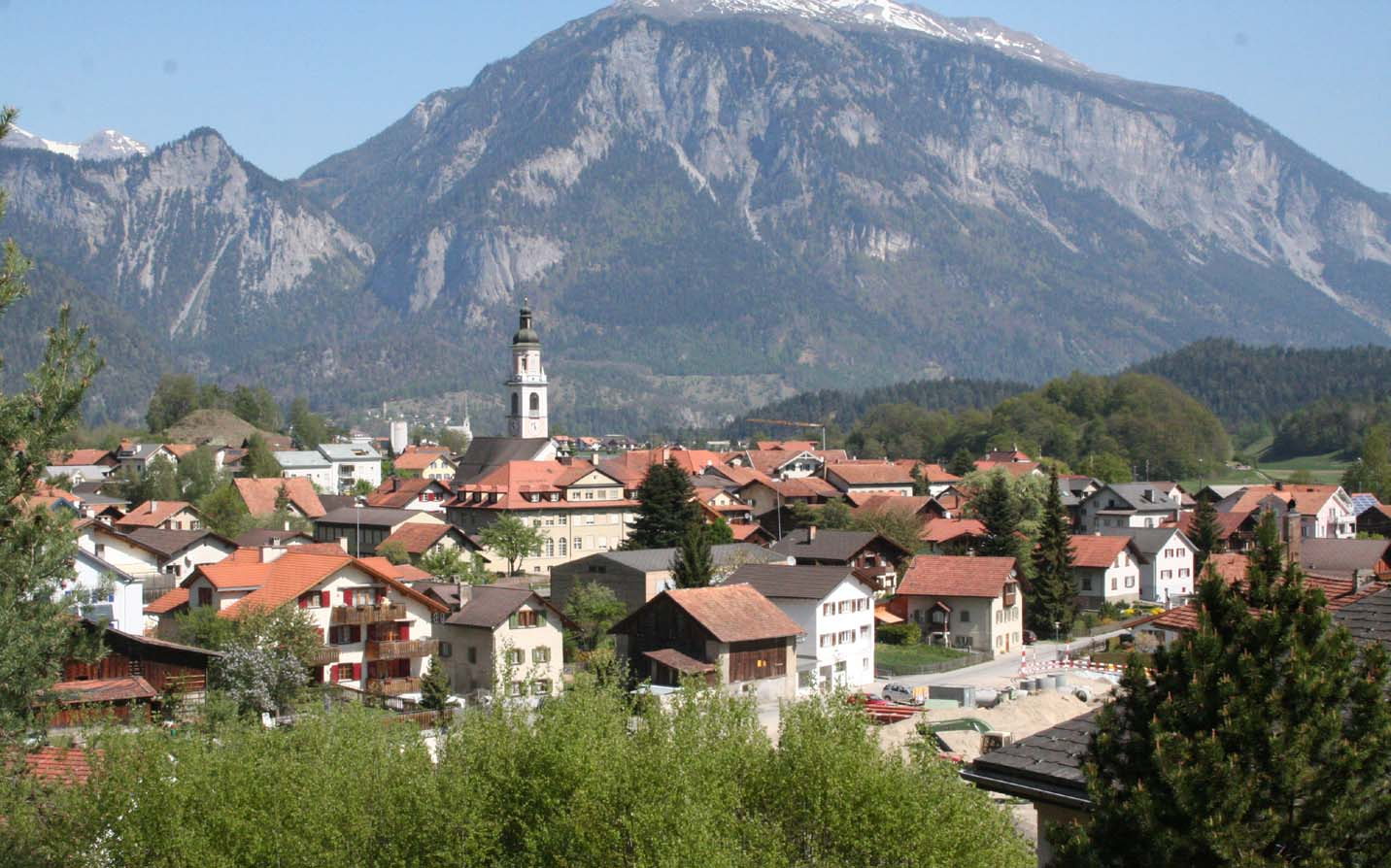
- Rhäzüns village

- Flag Coat of arms
- Location of Rhäzüns
- Location within Switzerland Location within Canton of Grisons
- Coordinates: 46°48′N 9°24′E
- Country: Switzerland
- Canton: Grisons
- District: Imboden

Area
  - Total: 13.28 km^{2} (5.13 sq mi)
- Elevation: 657 m (2,156 ft)

Population (December 2020)
  - Total: 1,611
  - Density: 121.3/km^{2} (314.2/sq mi)
- Time zone: UTC+01:00 (CET)
  - Summer (DST): UTC+02:00 (CEST)
- Postal code: 7403
- SFOS number: 3723
- ISO 3166 code: CH-GR
- Surrounded by: Bonaduz, Cazis, Domat/Ems, Präz, Rothenbrunnen, Versam
- Website: www.rhaezuens.ch

Rhäzüns (German pronunciation: [rɛˈtsyns]; Romansh: Razén, pronounced [ʁɐˈtsen]) is a municipality in the Imboden Region in the Swiss canton of Grisons.

== History ==
Aerial view from 500 m by Walter Mittelholzer (1925)

Rhäzüns is first mentioned about 840 AD as Raezunne. It formed a single parish with Bonaduz until the Reformation. It was part of the Grey League from 1424. It was acquired by the House of Habsburg in 1497 but remained part of the Three Leagues for the purposes of jurisdiction. In the Treaty of Schönbrunn (1809), the Habsburg Monarchy ceded the lordship of Rhäzüns to France. It reverted to Habsburg after the defeat of Napoleon in 1814, but was assigned to Grisons in the Vienna Congress of 1815 (article 78). The transition of administrative power to Grisons, as a canton of the restored Swiss Confederacy, became effective only on 19 January 1819.

== Geography ==
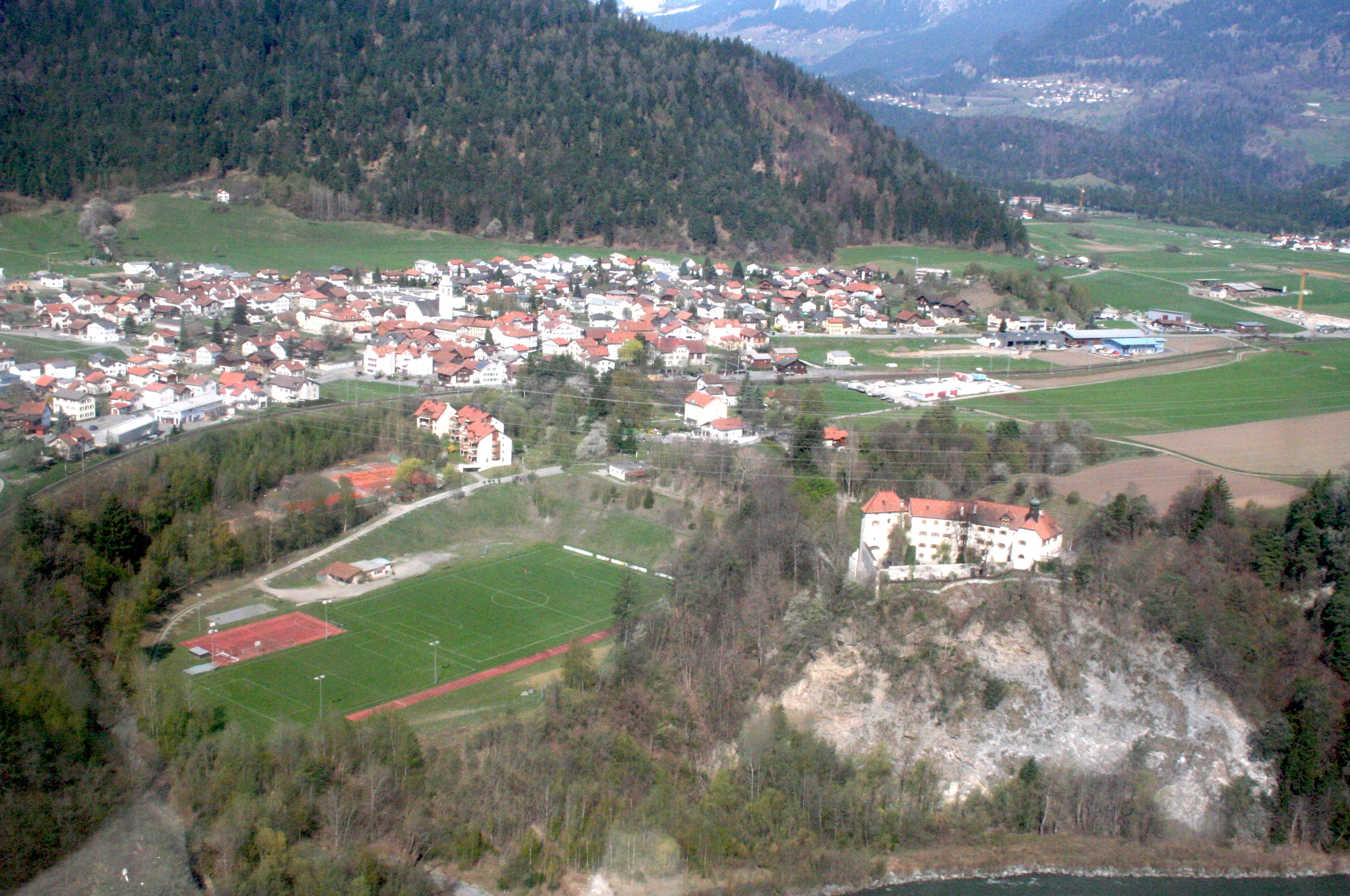
Rhäzüns Schloss and Rhäzüns village

Rhäzüns lies on the Hinterrhein, shortly before its confluence with the Vorderrhein.

Rhäzüns has an area, as of 2006, of 13.3 km^{2} (5.1 sq mi). Of this area, 23.3% is used for agricultural purposes, while 69.1% is forested. Of the rest of the land, 4.2% is settled (buildings or roads) and the remainder (3.4%) is non-productive (rivers, glaciers or mountains).

Before 2017, the municipality was located in the Rhäzüns sub-district, of the Imboden district, after 2017 it was part of the Imboden Region. It consists of the linear village of Rhäzüns in the valley between Bonaduz and the narrow entrance to the Domleschg valley.

== Demographics ==
Rhäzüns has a population (as of 31 December 2020) of 1,611. As of 2008, 15.4% of the population was made up of foreign nationals. Over the last 10 years the population has grown at a rate of 0.3%.

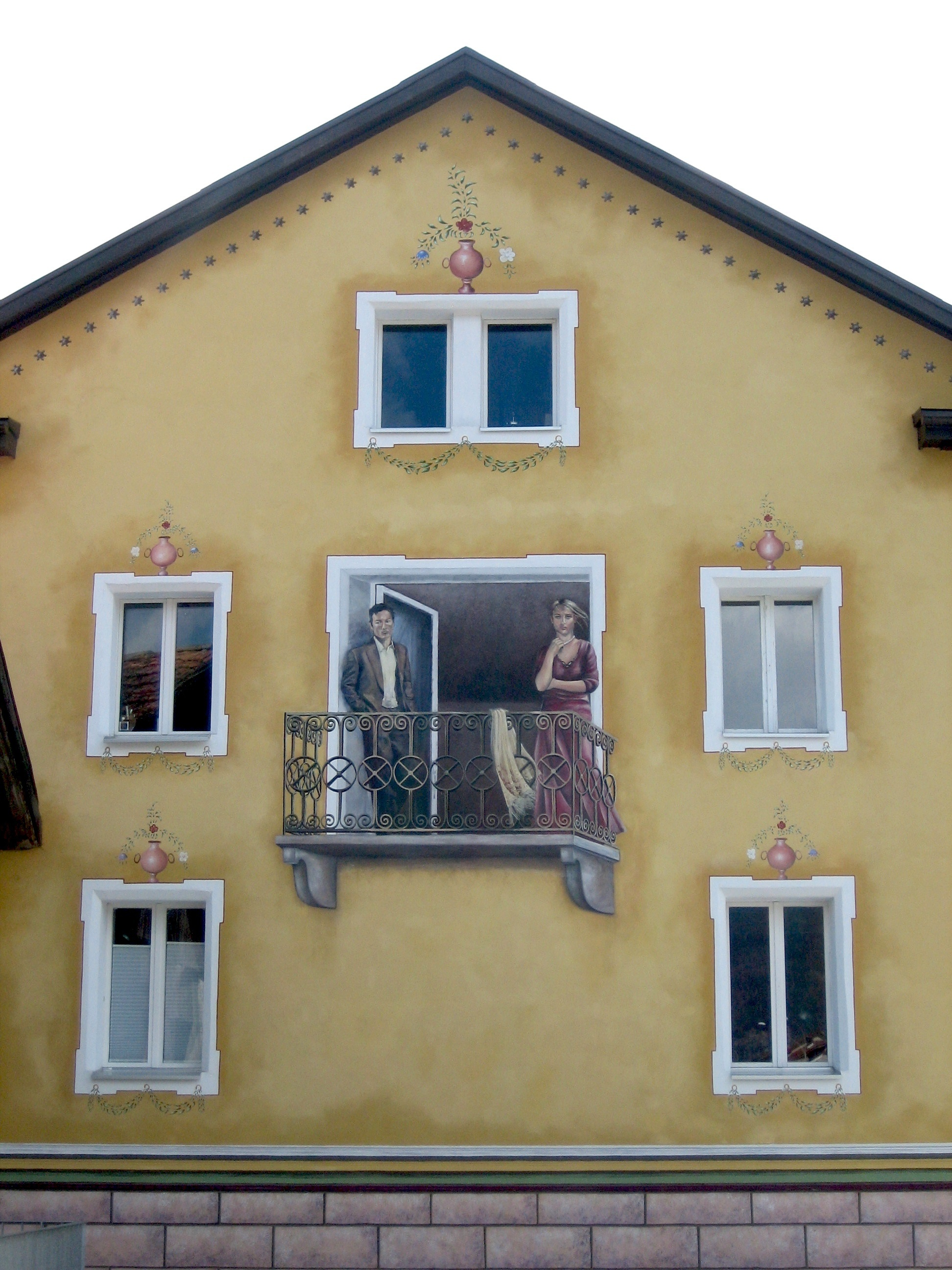
Illusion painted on a house in Rhäzüns

As of 2000, the gender distribution of the population was 49.2% male and 50.8% female. The age distribution, as of 2000, in Rhäzüns is; 191 people or 15.9% of the population are between 0 and 9 years old. 80 people or 6.7% are 10 to 14, and 69 people or 5.7% are 15 to 19. Of the adult population, 130 people or 10.8% of the population are between 20 and 29 years old. 192 people or 16.0% are 30 to 39, 203 people or 16.9% are 40 to 49, and 143 people or 11.9% are 50 to 59. The senior population distribution is 90 people or 7.5% of the population are between 60 and 69 years old, 81 people or 6.7% are 70 to 79, there are 22 people or 1.8% who are 80 to 89.

In the 2007 federal election the most popular party was the SVP which received 34.5% of the vote. The next three most popular parties were the CVP (23.2%), the SPS (21.9%) and the FDP (18.6%).

In Rhäzüns about 74.8% of the population (between age 25-64) have completed either non-mandatory upper secondary education or additional higher education (either university or a Fachhochschule).

Rhäzüns has an unemployment rate of 1.35%. As of 2005, there were 27 people employed in the primary economic sector and about 13 businesses involved in this sector. 178 people are employed in the secondary sector and there are 16 businesses in this sector. 112 people are employed in the tertiary sector, with 29 businesses in this sector.

From the 2000 census, 741 or 61.7% are Roman Catholic, while 280 or 23.3% belonged to the Swiss Reformed Church. Of the rest of the population, there are less than 5 individuals who belong to the Orthodox Church, and there are 11 individuals (or about 0.92% of the population) who belong to another Christian church. There are 63 (or about 5.25% of the population) who are Islamic. There are 9 individuals (or about 0.75% of the population) who belong to another church (not listed on the census), 55 (or about 4.58% of the population) belong to no church, are agnostic or atheist, and 42 individuals (or about 3.50% of the population) did not answer the question.

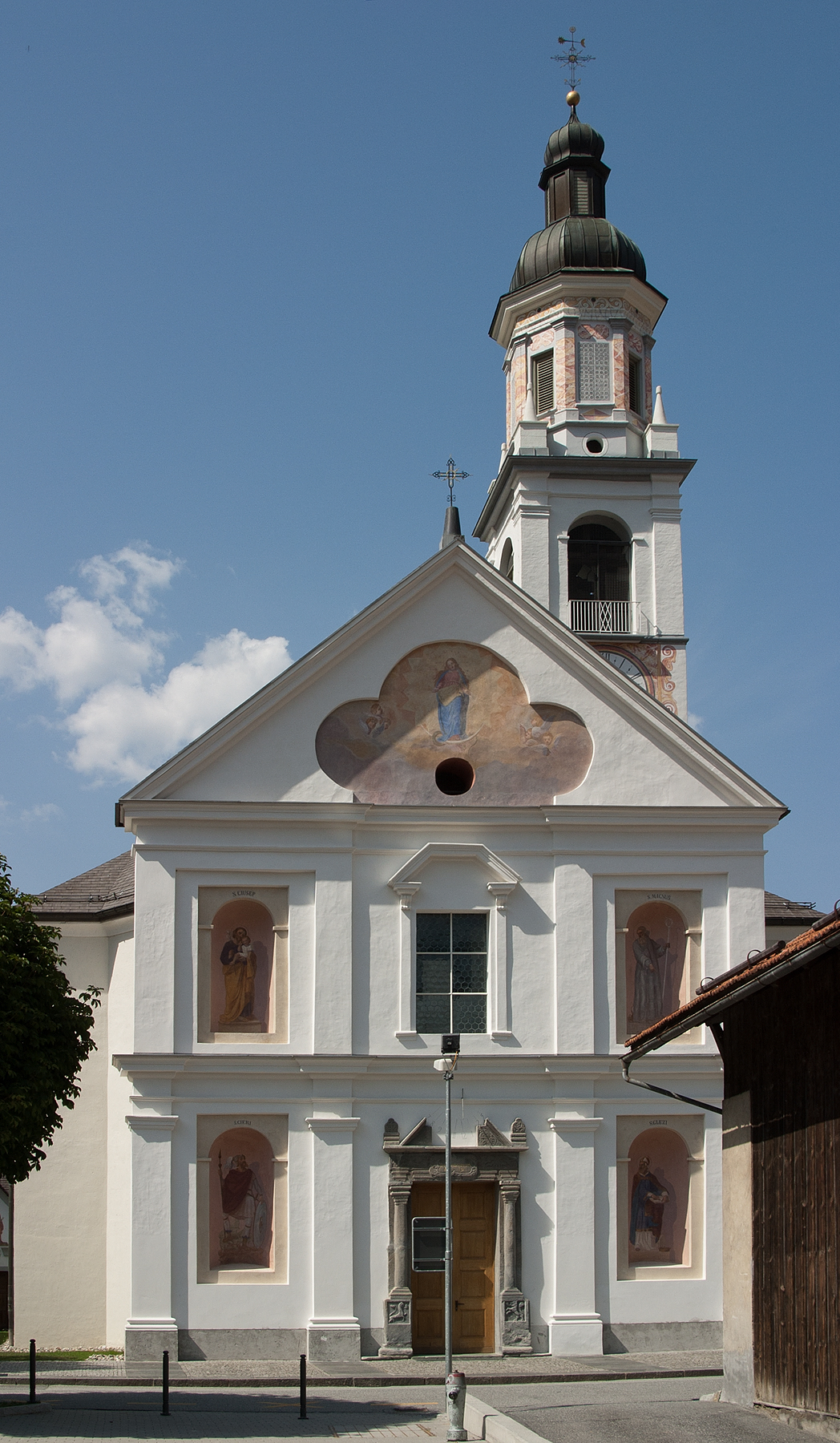
Parish church of the Immaculate Conception in Rhäzüns

The historical population is given in the following table:

year	population
1850	508
1900	495
1950	774
1960	776
1970	903
1980	958
1990	1,018
2000	1,201

== Languages ==
Most of the population (as of 2000) speaks German (79.4%), with Romansh being second most common (10.1%) and Italian being third ( 3.3%).

Languages in Rhäzüns
Languages	Census 1980		Census 1990		Census 2000	
Languages	Number	Percent	Number	Percent	Number	Percent
German	486	50.73%	736	72.30%	953	79.35%
Romansh	369	38.52%	374	36.74%	121	10.07%
Italian	82	8.56%	48	4.72%	40	3.33%
Population	958	100%	1018	100%	1201	100%

== Products ==
It is known for its mineral water brand Rhäzünser and the beer Rhäzünser Pils.

== Heritage sites of national significance ==
The Baselgia S. Gieri/St. George's Church frescos and the baselgia S. Paul\St. Paul's Church are listed as Swiss heritage sites of national significance.

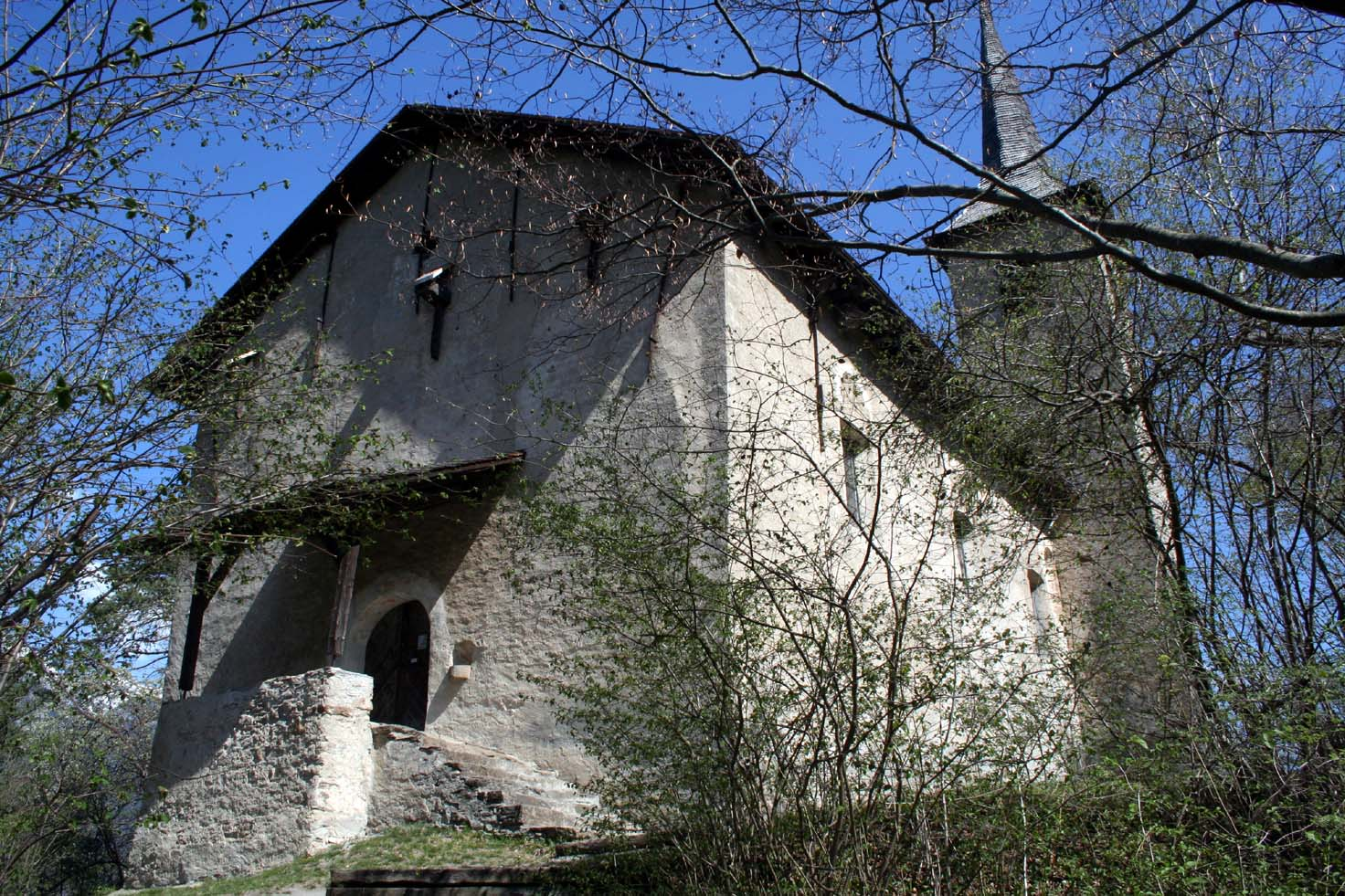
Baselgia S. Gieri/St. George's Church exterior

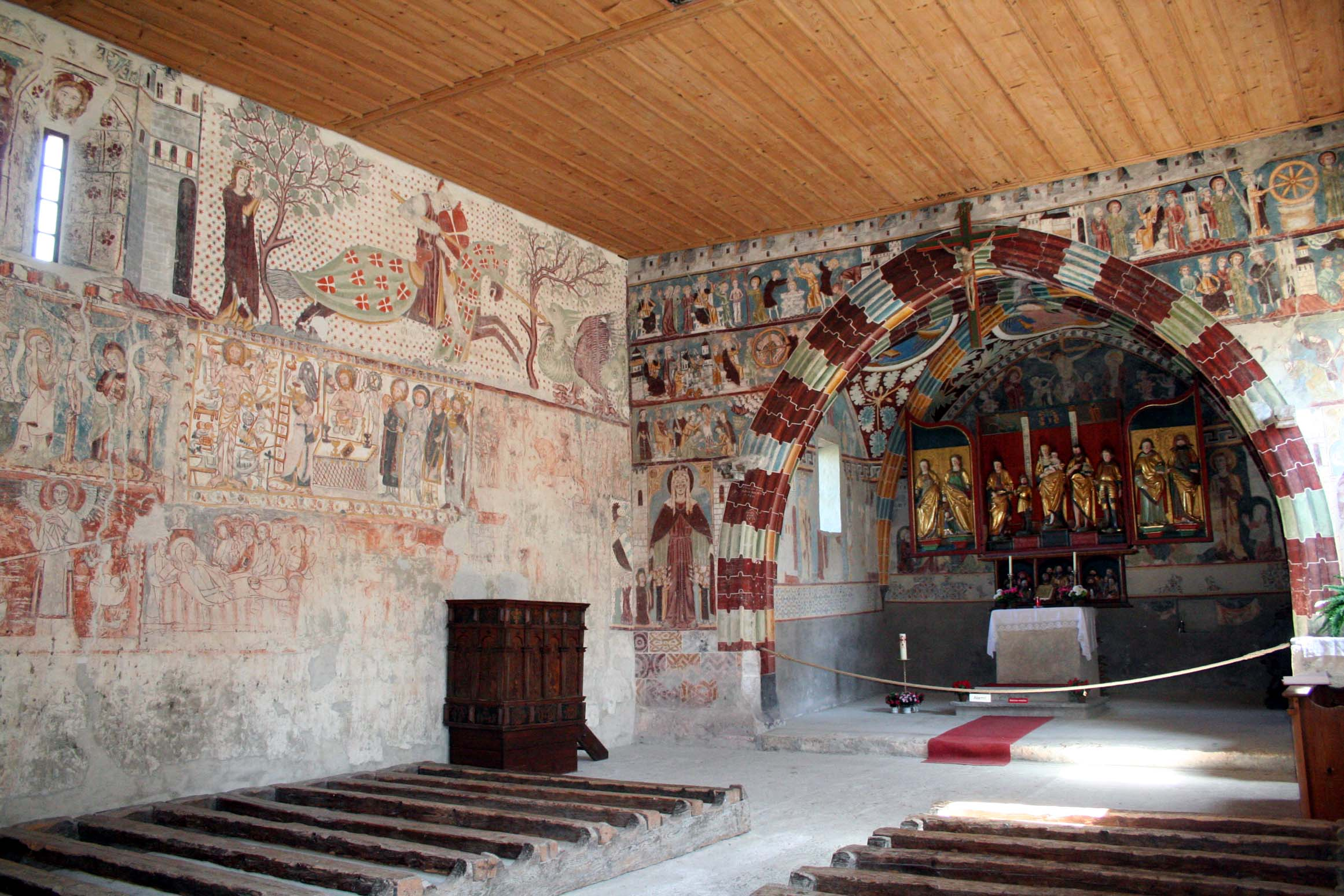
S. Gieri/St. George interior, looking to the south

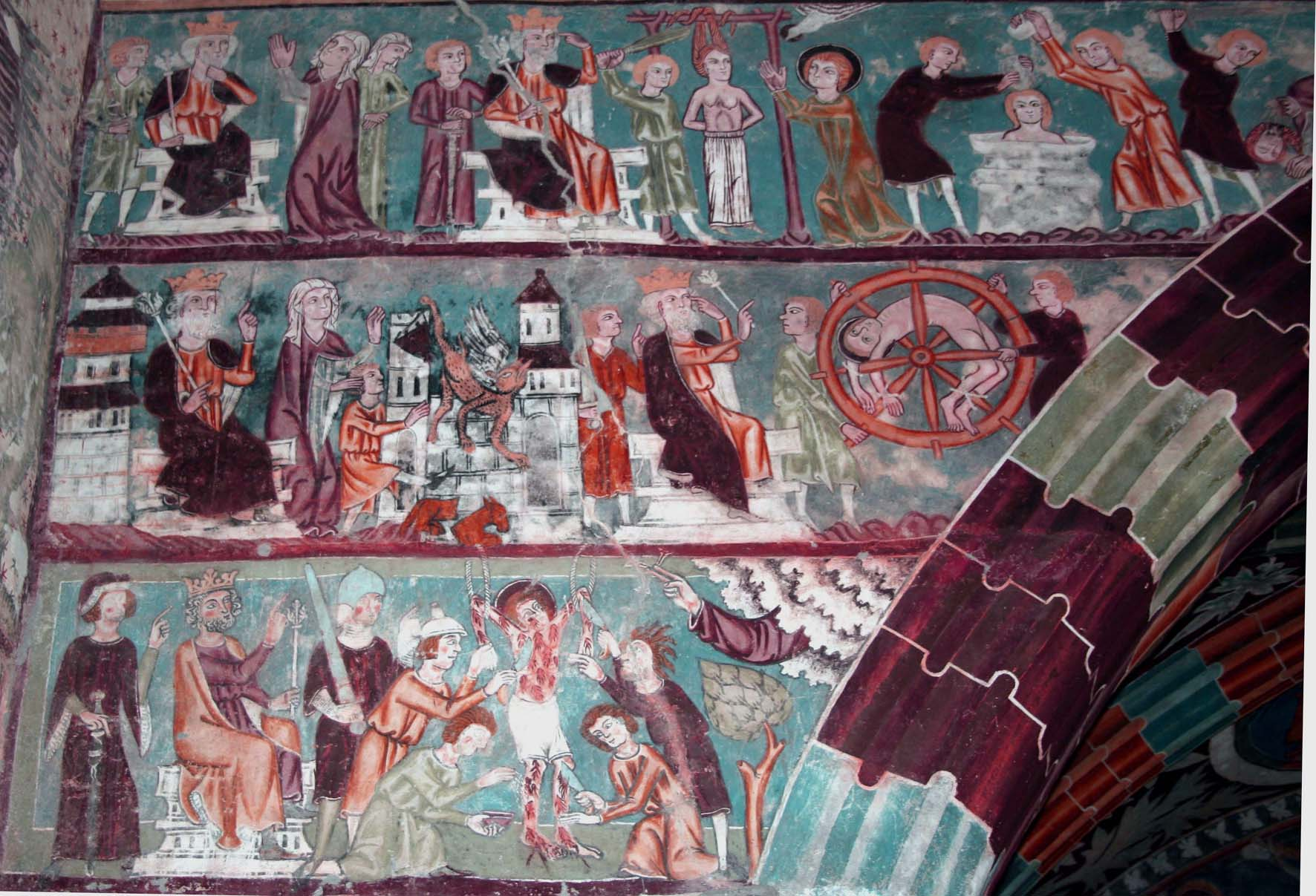
S. Gieri/St. George interior, left choir wall

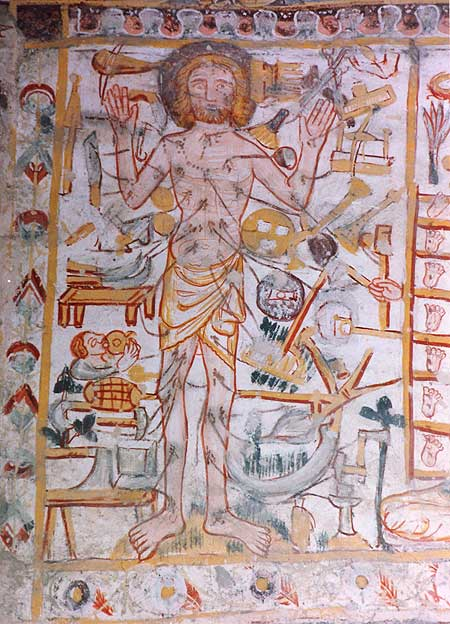
S. Gieri/St. George painting of a Holiday Christus

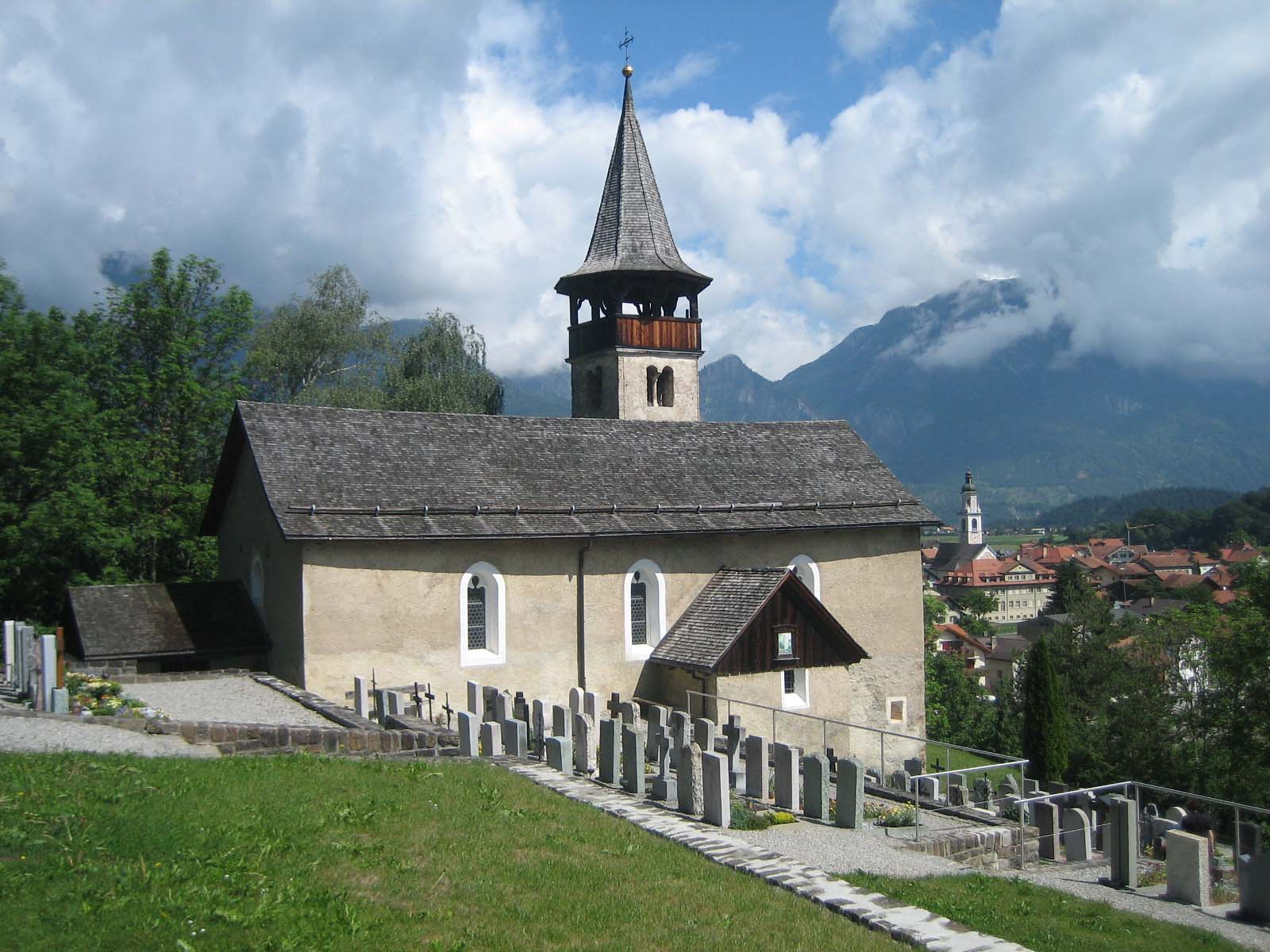
St. Paul's Church exterior

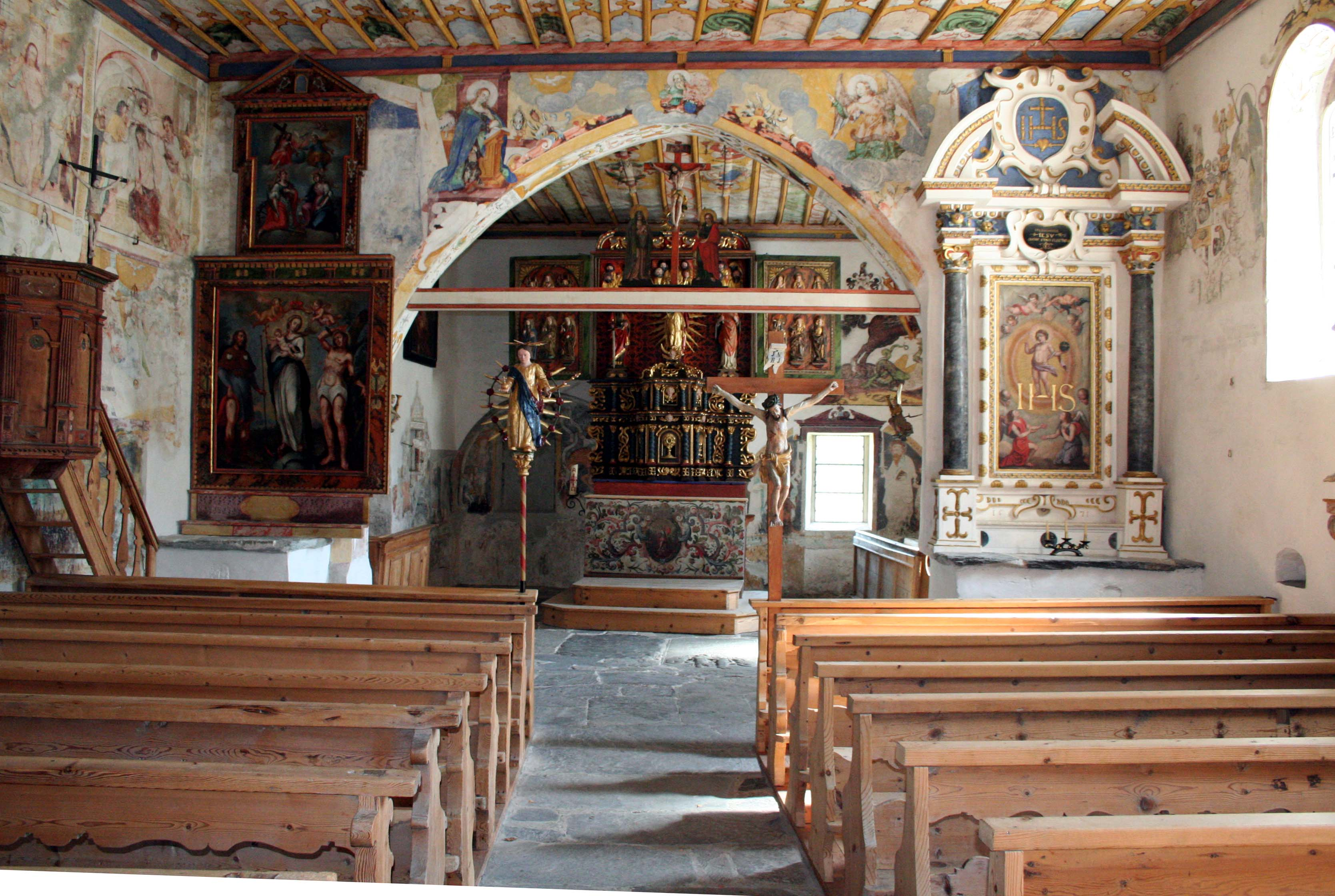
St. Paul's Interior

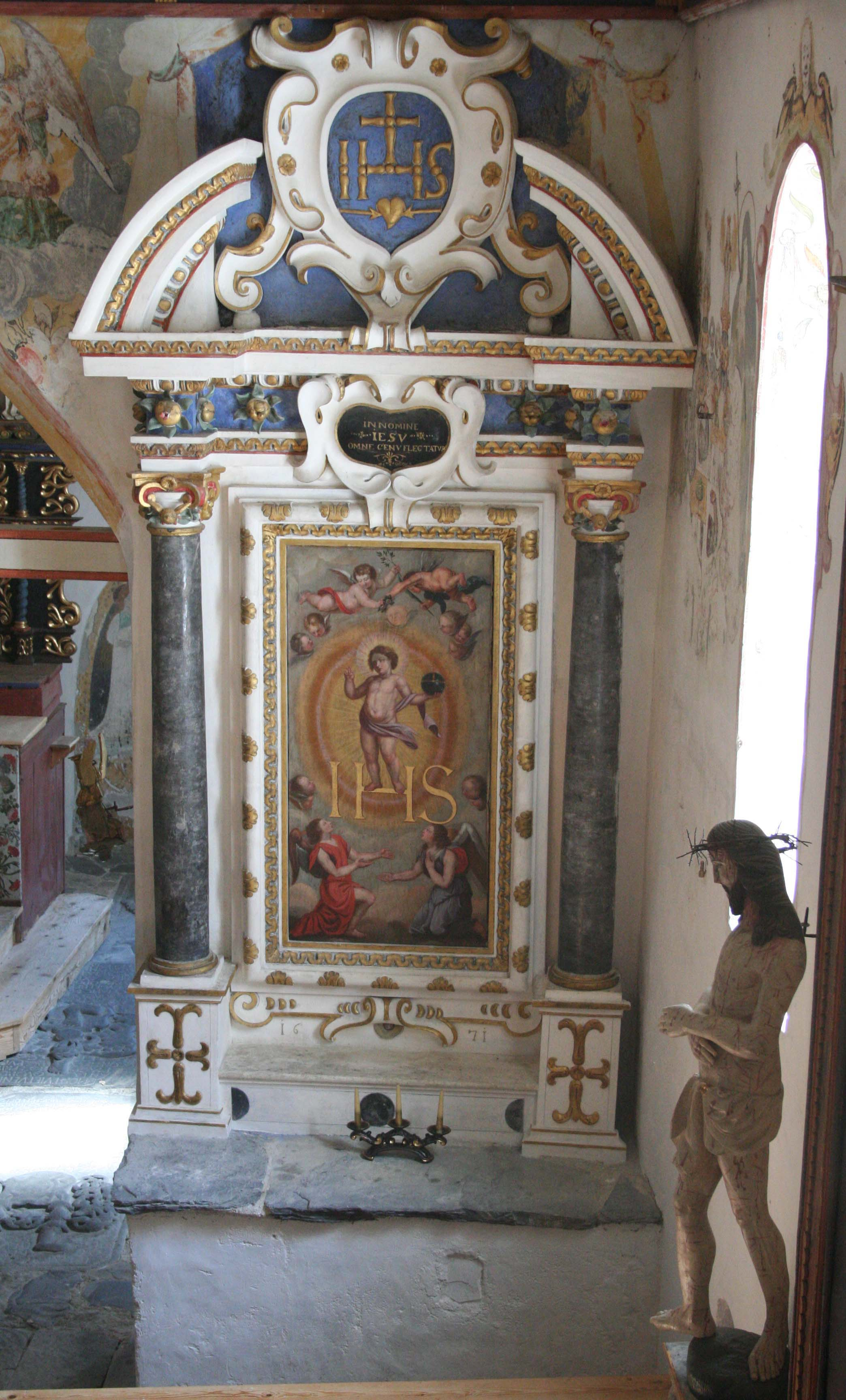
St. Paul's, side altar

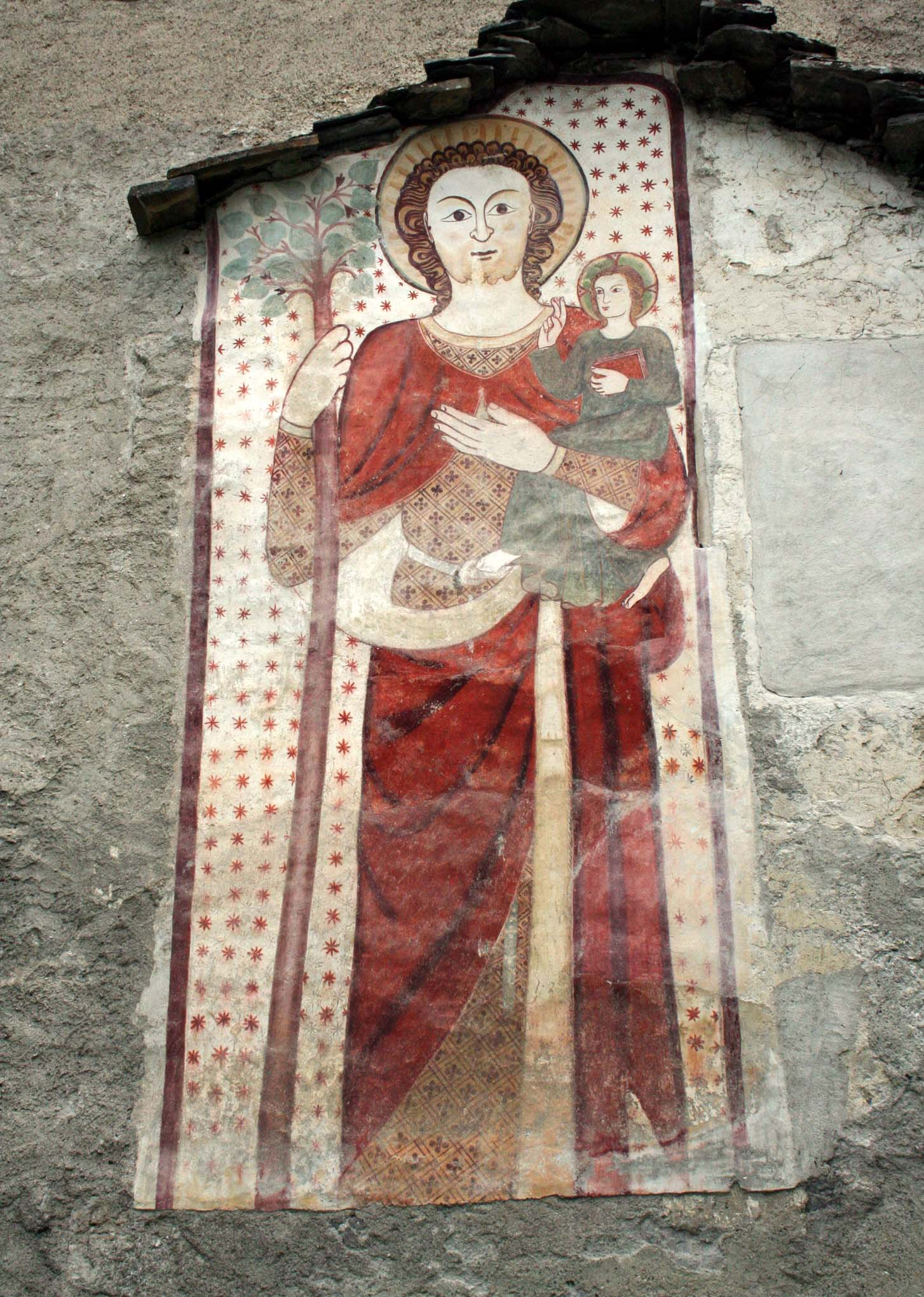
St. Paul's Church, painting of St. Christopher

== Transportation ==
Rhaetian Railway operate services to Rhäzüns (Rhaetian Railway station).
