= Imboden Region =

Coordinates: 46.85°N 9.35°E

Imboden Region Region Imboden (German) Regiun Plaun (Romansh)
- District
- Country: Switzerland
- Canton: Graubünden

Area
  - Total: 203.80 km^{2} (78.69 sq mi)

Population (2020)
  - Total: 21,500
  - Density: 105/km^{2} (273/sq mi)
- Time zone: UTC+1 (CET)
  - Summer (DST): UTC+2 (CEST)
- Municipalities: 7

Imboden Region is one of the eleven administrative districts in the canton of Graubünden in Switzerland. It has an area of 203.80 square kilometers (78.69 sq mi) and a population of 21,500 (as of 31 December 2020). It was created on 1 January 2017 as part of a reorganization of the Canton.

Municipalities in the Imboden Region
Municipality	Population (31 December 2020)	Area (km^{2})
Bonaduz	3,468	14.4
Domat/Ems	8,161	24.22
Rhäzüns	1,611	13.37
Felsberg	2,640	13.4
Flims	2,915	50.51
Tamins	1,226	40.74
Trin	1,479	47.17

== Languages ==
Languages of the former Imboden District, GR
Languages	Census 2000	
Languages	Number	Percent
German	13,498	80.1%
Romansh	1,447	8.6%
Italian	709	4.2%
TOTAL	16,859	100%
