= Brigelser Hörner =

Mountain in Switzerland

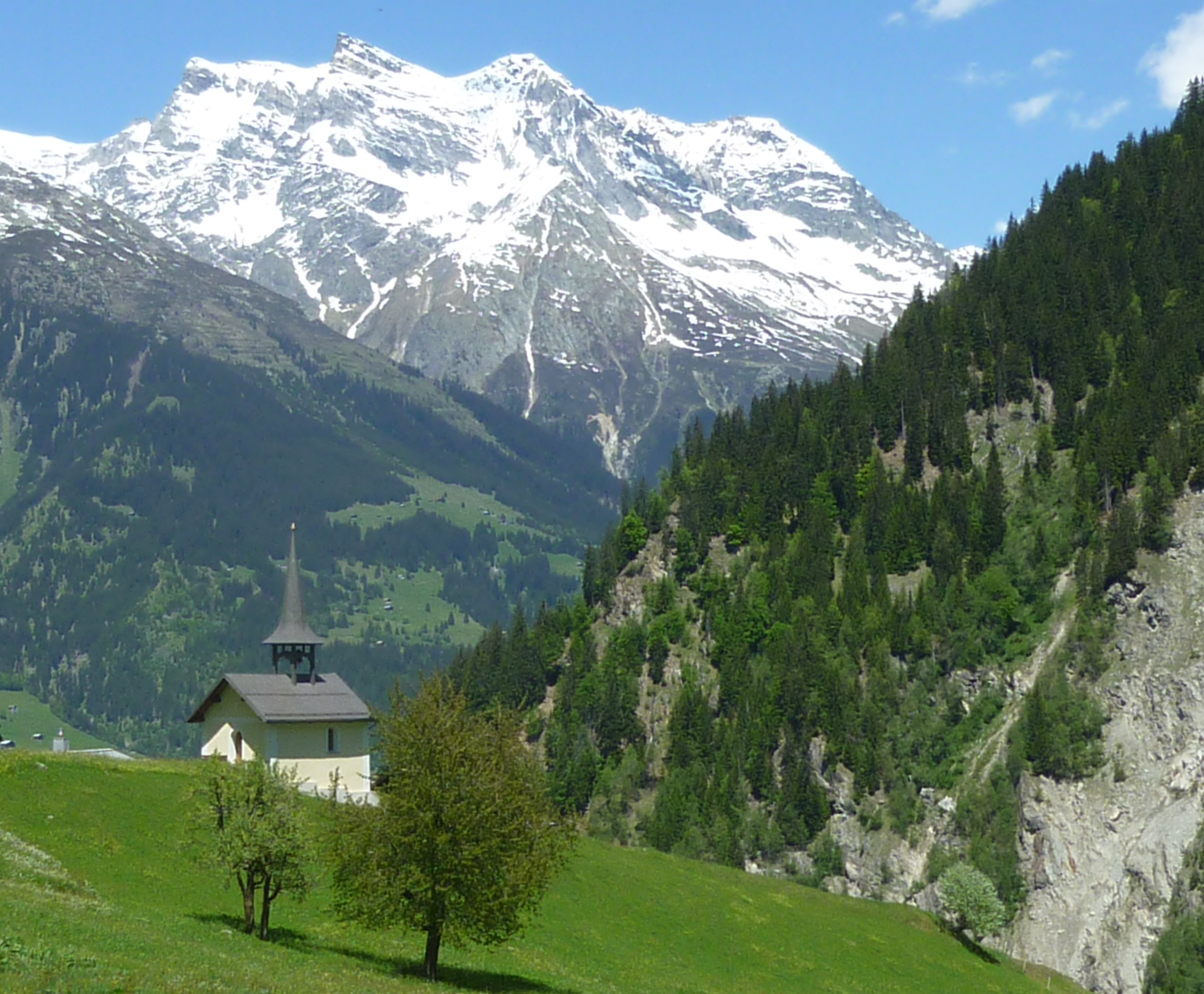
- The four horns of the Brigelser Hörner as seen from the south from Val Sumvitg across the Surselva

Highest point
- Peak: Cavistrau Grond
- Elevation: 3,251 m (10,666 ft)
- Prominence: 448 m (1,470 ft)
- Parent peak: Tödi
- Coordinates: 46°47′4.1″N 8°58′25.8″E

Geography
- Location within Switzerland
- Location: Graubünden
- Country: Switzerland
- Parent range: Glarus Alps
- Topo map: Swiss Federal Office of Topography swisstopo

Climbing
- First ascent: 19 July 1865 by Rudolf Elmer

The Brigelser Hörner is a mountain massif in the Glarus Alps, and a range overlooking Breil/Brigels and Trun in canton of Graubünden. To its northern side above Val Frisal lies a nameless firn field. They are connected to the north by the saddle Barcun risal Sut (2,805 metres (9,203 ft)) with Piz Frisal and Piz Durschin at the border to canton of Glarus.

It consists of the following peaks, from west to east:

- Cap Grond, 3195 m
- Cavistrau Grond, 3251 m
- Cavistrau Pign, 3219 m
- Piz Tumpiv, 3100 m

In a broader sense, the following peaks are also part of the Hörner:

- Piz Dadens, 2772 m
- Piz Dado, 2698 m
