= Grond (disambiguation) =

The Gamma-Ray Burst Optical/Near-Infrared Detector is an imaging instrument at La Silla Observatory in Chile.

Grond may also refer to:

== Places ==
- Cavistrau Grond, a mountain in Switzerland
- De Nieuwe Grond, a resort in Suriname
- Laaxersee (also known as "Lag Grond"), a lake in Switzerland
- Lai Grond, a lake in Piz Ela

== People ==
- Valerio Grond (born 2000), Swiss skier

== Fiction ==
- Grond (Middle-earth), a battering ram featured in The Lord of the Rings
- Grond, a monster in Champions Online
- Gronds, a fictional weight unit in Eamon

== Other ==
- Cusegl Grond, Romanish legislature in Grisons
- Uit oude Grond, album by Heidevolk
