= Laus =

Laus may refer to:

== Places ==
- Laüs, an ancient city on the west coast of Lucania
- Laus River, a river of southern Italy
- Lag da Laus
- Saint-Étienne-le-Laus, an administrative division in the Hautes-Alpes department in southeastern France
- Notre-Dame-du-Laus, Quebec, a municipality in Canada

== People ==
- Paul Laus (born 1970), former professional ice hockey player
- Beatrice Kristi Laus (born 2000), Filipino-British singer-songwriter and guitarist
- Camille Laus (born 1993), Belgian sprinter
- Abdon Laus
- Honcques Laus
- Tony Laus
- Pia Laus-Schneider
- Mauro Laus
- Laus Omar Mhina

== Other ==
- Our Lady of Laus, the first Marian apparition approved in the 21st century by the Catholic Church
- Laus Polyphoniae

== See also ==
- Los Angeles Union Station
