= Val Russein =

Valley in the Swiss Alps

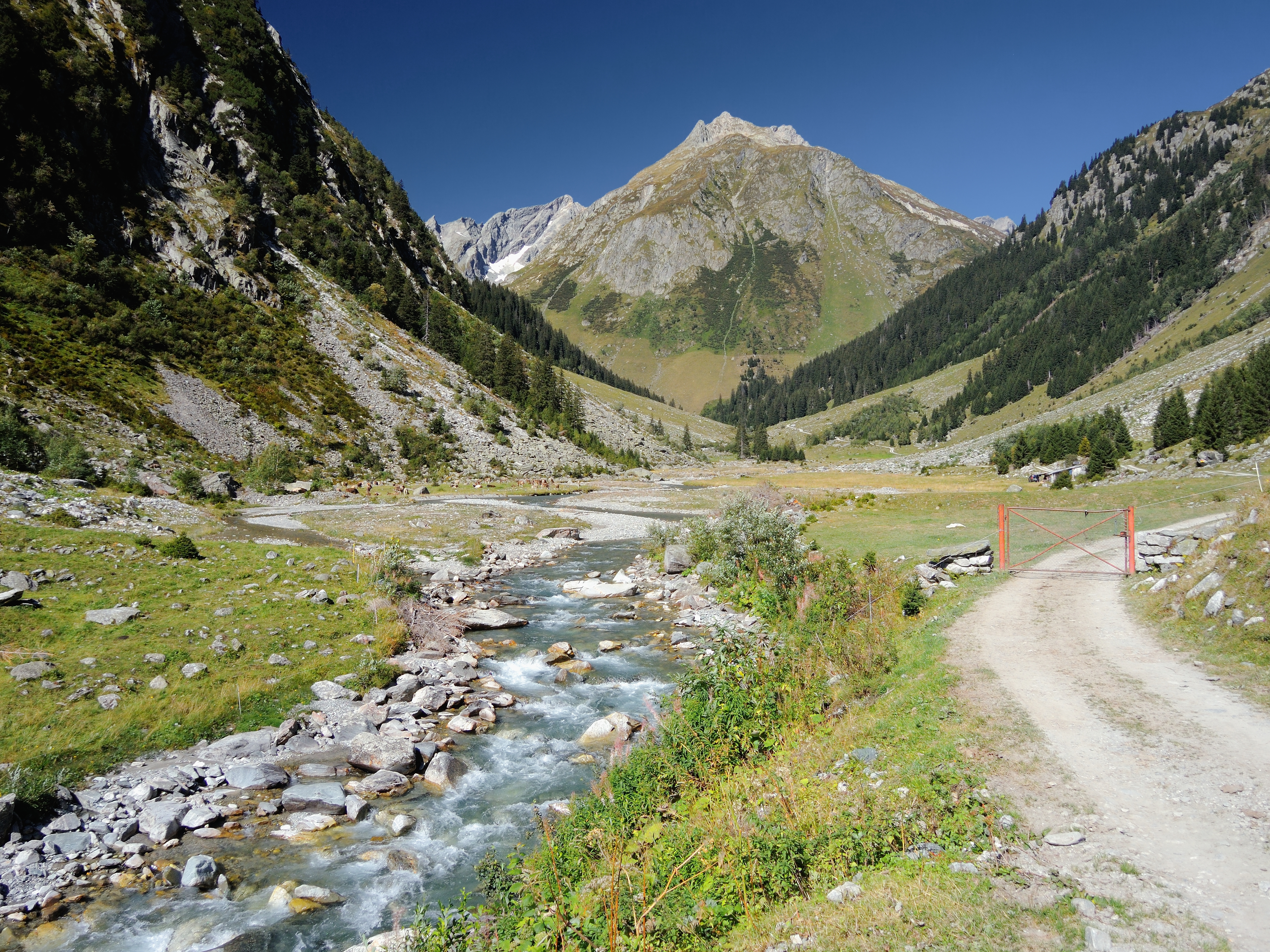
Aua da Russein at Tegia Nova (approx. 1,480 m). View towards the Düssi range

The Val Russein is a valley of the Swiss Alps, located south of the Tödi Group in Graubünden. The valley is drained by the Aua da Russein, a tributary of the Vorderrhein, near Cumpadials (962 m). The Val Russein belongs to the municipalities of Disentis and Sumvitg.

Three valleys converge at Alp Cavrein (1,575 m) to form the main Val Russein: Val Cavadiras, Val Gronda da Cavrein and Val Gronda da Russein. The entire valley is approximately 10 kilometres long.

The Val Russein includes some of the highest mountains in the canton of Graubünden outside the Bernina Range. The highest mountain is the Tödi (also named Piz Russein) with a height of 3,614 metres above sea level. Other high summits overlooking the valley are Piz Urlaun (3,359 m), Düssi (3,256 m) and Piz Cambrialas (3,208 m). The Val Russein is connected to the canton of Uri by the Fuorcla Cavadiras (2,609 m) and to the canton of Glarus by the Sandpass (2,781 m).

A small hydroelectric dam is located at Barcuns Dadens, at an elevation of 1,362 metres. At the bottom of the valley, the river is crossed by a road bridge and a rail viaduct.
