= Cavistrau =

Mountain in Switzerland

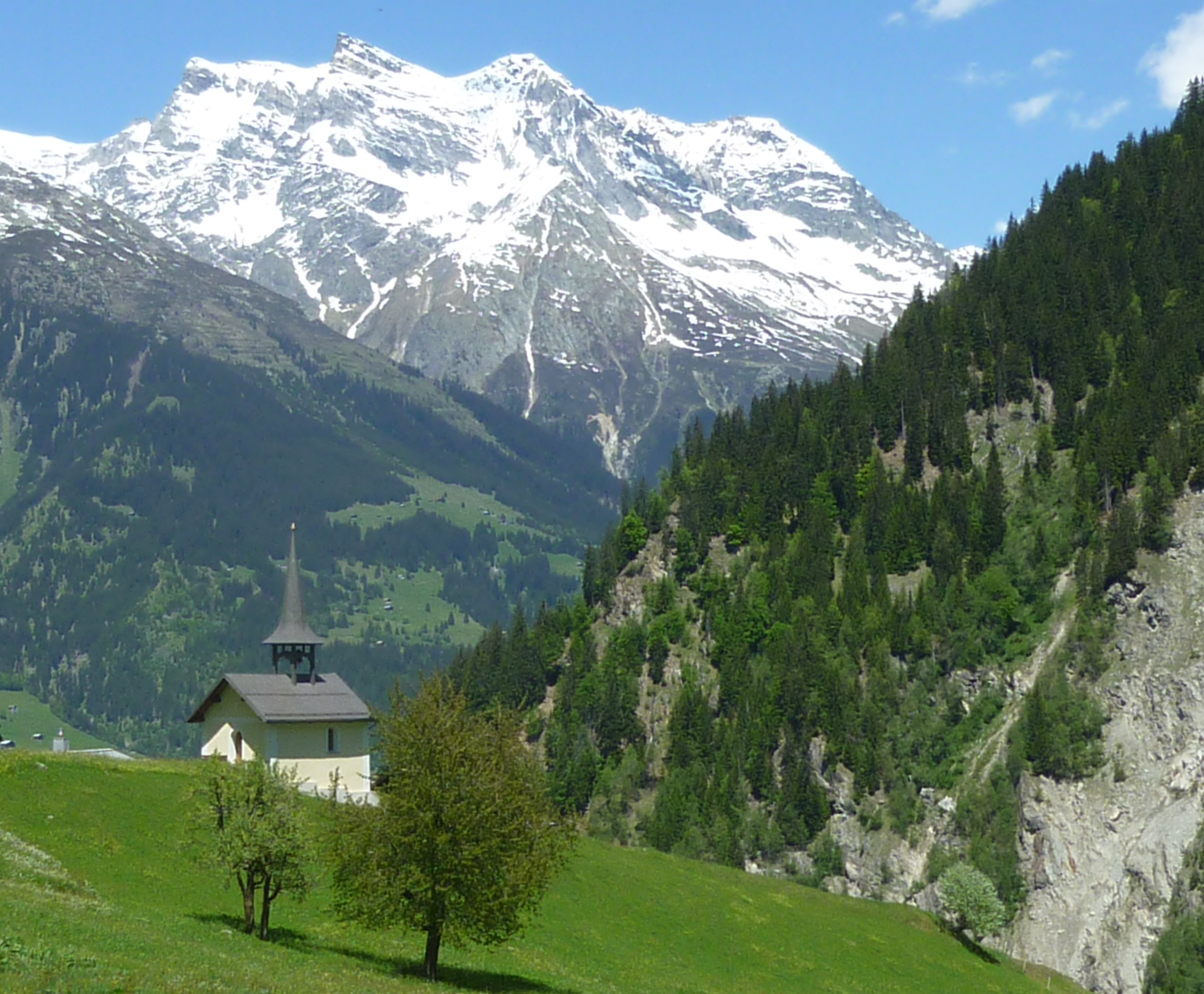
- The south side of the Brigelser Hörner as seen from Val Sumvitg across the Surselva

Highest point
- Peak: Cavistrau Grond
- Elevation: 3,251 m (10,666 ft)
- Prominence: 448 m (1,470 ft)
- Parent peak: Tödi
- Listing: Alpine mountains above 3000 m
- Coordinates: 46°47′4.1″N 8°58′25.8″E

Geography
- Location within Switzerland
- Location: Graubünden
- Country: Switzerland
- Parent range: Glarus Alps
- Topo map: Swiss Federal Office of Topography swisstopo

Climbing
- First ascent: 19 July 1865 by Rudolf Elmer

The Cavistrau is a mountain consisting of two summits in the Glarus Alps, overlooking Brigels and Trun in canton of Graubünden. The mountain belongs to the Brigelser Hörner, of which Cavistrau Grond (3251 m) is the highest and Cavistrau Pign (3219 m), just 230 metres to its east side, the second highest. To its northern side above Val Frisal lies a nameless firn field.

The Cavistrau Grond is the highest mountain of the Glarus Alps lying entirely in Graubünden. The border with the canton of canton of Glarus is located a few kilometres north, across Val Frisal.
