= Piz Nadéls =

Mountain in Switzerland

- Location within Switzerland

Highest point
- Elevation: 2,789 m (9,150 ft)
- Prominence: 59 m (194 ft)
- Parent peak: Piz Gren
- Coordinates: 46°41′24.3″N 8°59′26.2″E

Geography
- Location: Graubünden, Switzerland
- Parent range: Lepontine Alps

Piz Nadéls is a mountain of the Swiss Lepontine Alps, located south of Trun in the canton of Graubünden. It lies on the chain between the Val Sumvitg and Val Zavragia.

Its steep western face overlooks the Val Nadéls.
