= Trun =

Trun may refer to:

- Trun, Switzerland
  - Trun railway station, a Rhaetian Railway station
- Trun, Orne, France
- Tran, Bulgaria (using alternative transliteration)
