= Rabius =

Coordinates: 46.7338°N 8.9606°E

Rabius is the largest village in the municipality of Sumvitg, Graubünden, Switzerland. It has a station on the Disentis - Reichenau line of the Rhaetian Railway. The name is mentioned for the first time in a 1203 document.

Two rivers flow past the village which could be for the inhabitants occasionally quite rabiat (in the local dialect), therefore giving the name "Rabius" to the village.

In former days, on these streams watermills were built (reflected in the Rabius coat of arms). The mills provided power for amongst other places, the local carpenter's workshop.

Rabius has 574 inhabitants, most of whom are occupied in trade and handicraft. Rabius is not particularly a tourism centre.

There are various hotels and restaurants here. the church is rather grubby as it is stained. it is part of the sumvitg area. The railway station is where the trains pass by.

Aerial view (1957)

== SHOPS ==
There was a volg in rabius, which was actually a volg mini, so a bit smaller than a volg, but still a great value swiss shop
