= Piz Dado =

Mountain in Switzerland

- Location within Switzerland

Highest point
- Elevation: 2,698 m (8,852 ft)
- Prominence: 89 m (292 ft)
- Parent peak: Tödi
- Coordinates: 46°47′27.1″N 9°00′55.5″E

Geography
- Country: Switzerland
- Canton: Graubünden
- Parent range: Glarus Alps
- Topo map: Swiss Federal Office of Topography swisstopo

Piz Dado is a mountain peak of the Glarus Alps, situated above Breil/Brigels in the canton of Graubünden. It is the most eastern peak of the Brigelser Hörner just next to Piz Dadens (2772 m).
