= Piz Cambrialas =

Mountain in Switzerland

- Location within Switzerland

Highest point
- Elevation: 3,208 m (10,525 ft)
- Prominence: 364 m (1,194 ft)
- Parent peak: Düssi
- Listing: Alpine mountains above 3000 m
- Coordinates: 46°47′22″N 8°51′07″E

Geography
- Location: Graubünden, Switzerland
- Parent range: Glarus Alps

Climbing
- First ascent: North summit: 1866 by Utterson Kelso and Ambros Zgraggen; South summit: 1905 by Fritz Weber and Josmarie Indergand

Piz Cambrialas (3,208 m) is a mountain of the Glarus Alps, overlooking the Val Russein in the Swiss canton of Graubünden.

The mountain lies in the range between the Maderanertal and the Val Russein and has two summits of nearly-identical height separated by a ca. 100 m deep saddle. The north summit (3,205 m) is 100 m southeast of the watershed and the border with the canton of Uri. It can be relatively easily ascended over the Ober Hüfifirn glacier.

The 3 m higher south summit can be reached in about an hour over the ridge connecting the summits, via a 6-hour scramble over the south ridge, or via the east ridge with up to UIAA IV+ climbing. The rarely visited true summit reportedly was only reached in 1905, very late for a mountain in the Alps and 39 years after the north summit had been scaled.
