= Sumvitg-Cumpadials railway station =

Railway station in Switzerland

Sumvitg-Cumpadials
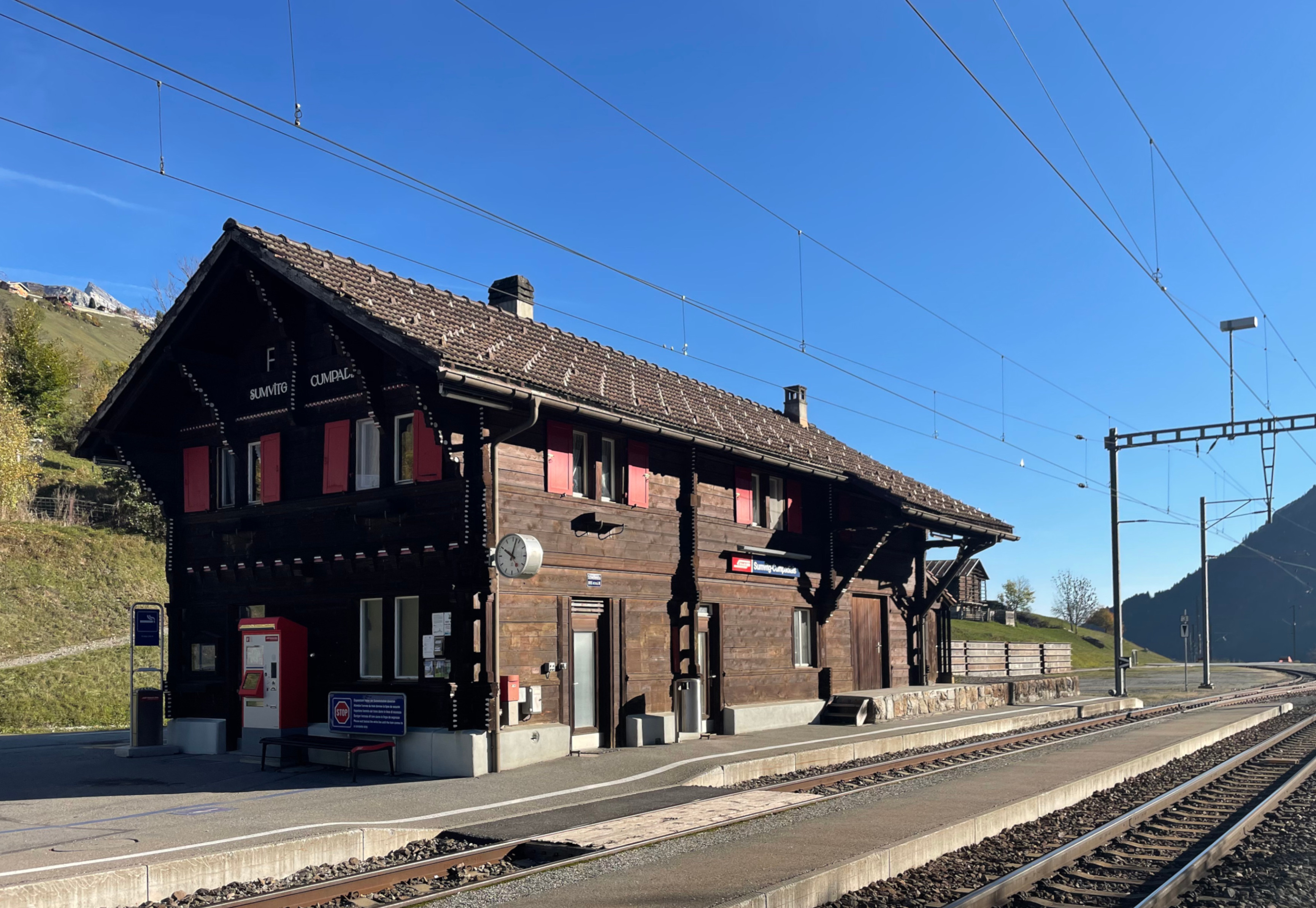
- The station in 2014

General information
- Location: Sumvitg; Switzerland
- Coordinates: 46°43′27″N 8°55′53″E
- Elevation: 982 m (3,222 ft)
- Owner: Rhaetian Railway
- Line: Reichenau-Tamins–Disentis/Mustér line
- Distance: 66.3 km (41.2 mi) from Landquart
- Platforms: 2
- Train operators: Rhaetian Railway
- Connections: Sumvitg Turissem seasonal bus service

Construction
- Architect: Meinrad Lorenz (1912)

History
- Opened: 1 August 1912
- Electrified: 22 May 1922

Passengers
- 2018: 120 per weekday

Services
Preceding station	Rhaetian Railway	Following station
Disentis/Mustér Terminus	RE 7	Rabius-Surrein towards Chur
Location

Sumvitg-Cumpadials railway station (German: Bahnhof Sumvitg-Cumpadials) is a railway station in the municipality of Sumvitg, in the Swiss canton of Graubünden. It is an intermediate stop on the 1,000 mm (3 ft 3 3/8 in) gauge Reichenau-Tamins–Disentis/Mustér line of the Rhaetian Railway.

== Services ==
As of the December 2023 timetable change, the following services stop at Sumvitg-Cumpadials:

- RegioExpress: hourly service between Disentis/Mustér and Chur.

During the summer months Sumvitg Turissem operates a weekend-only minibus to the Val Sumvitg.

== Facilities ==
There is a small waiting room at this station. There was a toilet, but this has recently been permanently locked. There is also a ticket machine. There is also a bike storage rack and ample parking.
