= Lag da Breil =

Lake in Graubünden, Switzerland

- Brigelser See
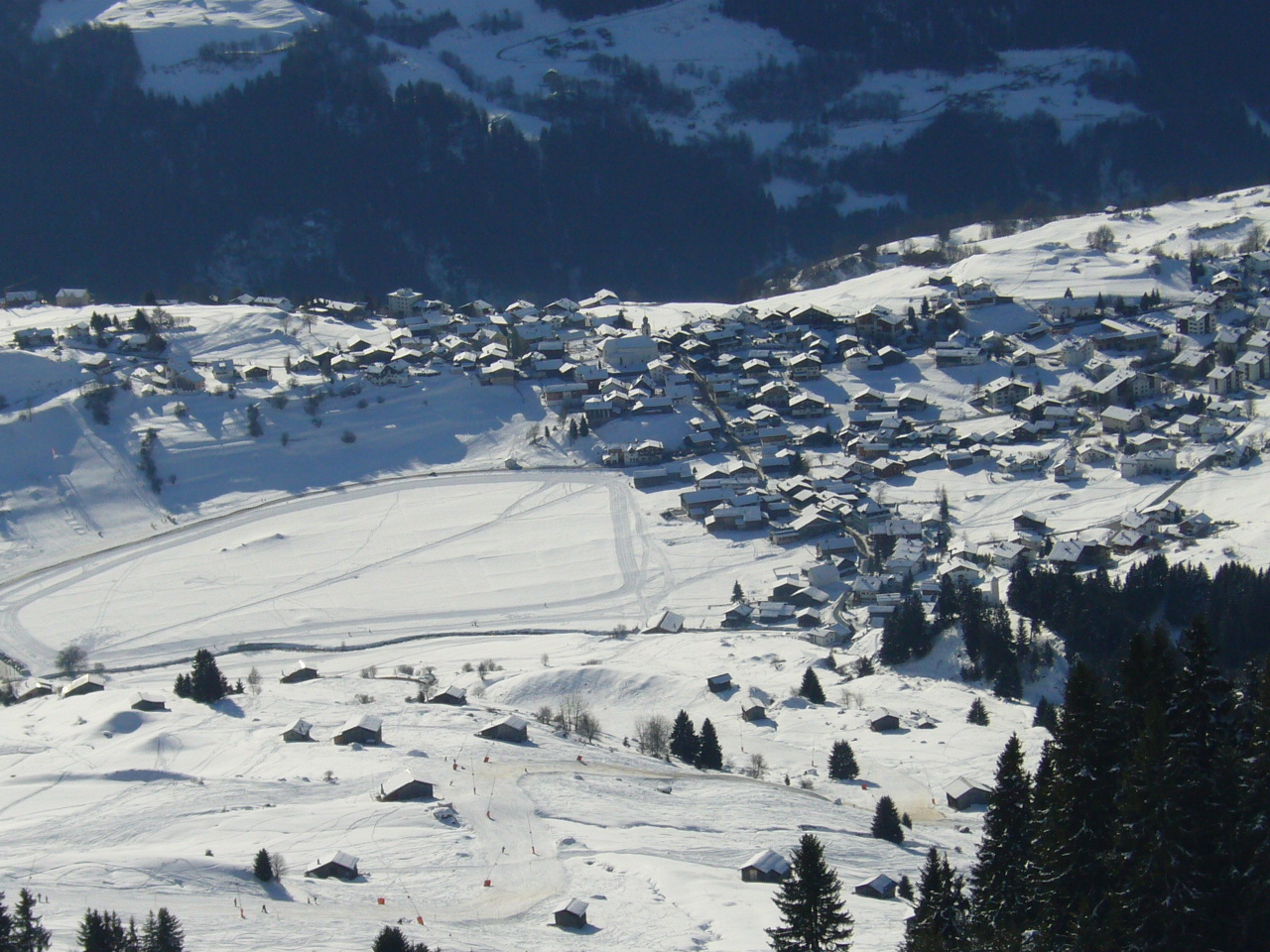
- Lake in winter

- Location within Canton of Graubünden Location within Switzerland Location within Italy Location within Alps
- Interactive map of Lag da Breil
- Location: Graubünden
- Coordinates: 46°46′18″N 9°04′18″E
- Primary inflows: Flem
- Primary outflows: Flem
- Basin countries: Switzerland
- Surface area: 5.9 ha (15 acres)
- Surface elevation: 1,255 m (4,117 ft)

The Lag da Breil (German: Brigelser See) is a lake located east of Breil/Brigels in the canton of Graubünden. It lies at a height of 1,255 metres above sea level and has a maximum length of 500 metres.

== See also ==
- List of mountain lakes of Switzerland
