= Schlans =

- Former municipality
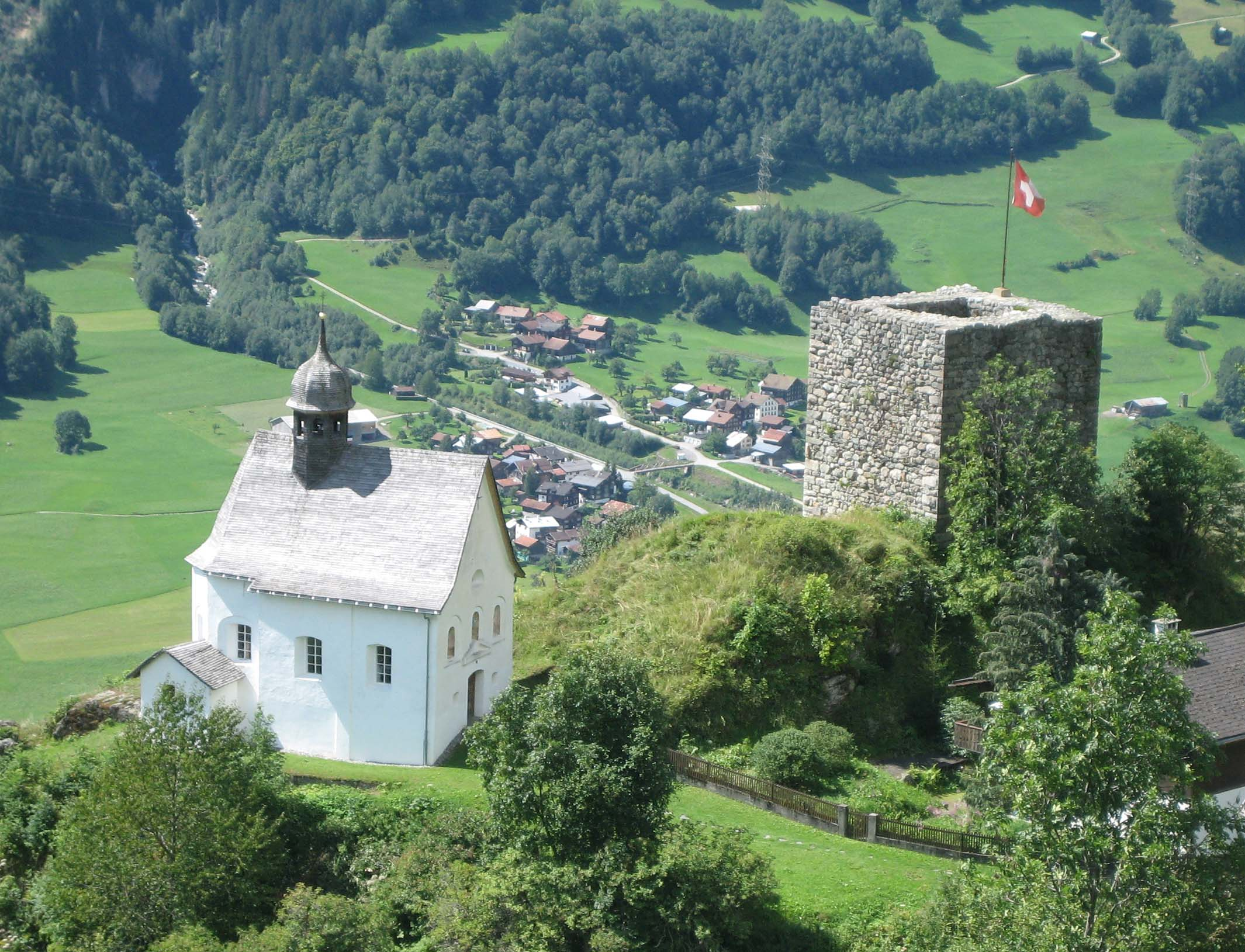

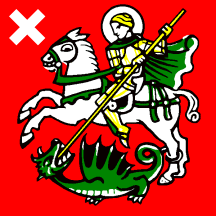
- Flag Coat of arms
- Location of Schlans
- Location within Switzerland Location within Canton of Graubünden
- Coordinates: 46°45′N 9°01′E
- Country: Switzerland
- Canton: Graubünden
- District: Surselva

Area
  - Total: 8.83 km^{2} (3.41 sq mi)
- Elevation: 1,146 m (3,760 ft)

Population (December 2010)
  - Total: 80
  - Density: 9.1/km^{2} (23/sq mi)
- Time zone: UTC+01:00 (CET)
  - Summer (DST): UTC+02:00 (CEST)
- Postal code: 7168
- SFOS number: 3984
- ISO 3166 code: CH-GR
- Surrounded by: Breil/Brigels, Trun
- Website: www.schlans.ch

Schlans is a former municipality in the district of Surselva in the Swiss canton of Graubünden. The municipality of Schlans merged on 1 January 2012 into the municipality of Trun.

== History ==
Schlans is first mentioned in 765 as Selaunum.

== Geography ==
Aerial view (1957)

Schlans had an area, as of 2006, of 8.8 km^{2} (3.4 sq mi). Of this area, 43.9% is used for agricultural purposes, while 25.7% is forested. Of the rest of the land, 1.7% is settled (buildings or roads) and the remainder (28.7%) is non-productive (rivers, glaciers or mountains).

The municipality is located in the Disentis sub-district of the Surselva district on the heights above the Vorderrhein valley. It consists of the village of Schlans.

== Demographics ==
Schlans had a population (as of 2010) of 80. As of 2008, 2.3% of the population was made up of foreign nationals. Over the last 10 years the population has decreased at a rate of -10%. Most of the population (as of 2000) speaks the Sursilvan dialect of Romansh(81.5%), with German being second most common (14.1%) and Spanish being third ( 3.3%).

As of 2000, the gender distribution of the population was 46.7% male and 53.3% female. The age distribution, as of 2000, in Schlans is; 15 children or 16.3% of the population are between 0 and 9 years old and 11 teenagers or 12.0% are between 10 and 19. Of the adult population, 7 people or 7.6% of the population are between 20 and 29 years old. 13 people or 14.1% are between 30 and 39, 10 people or 10.9% are between 40 and 49, and 8 people or 8.7% are between 50 and 59. The senior population distribution is 9 people or 9.8% of the population are between 60 and 69 years old, 12 people or 13.0% are between 70 and 79, there are 7 people or 7.6% who are between 80 and 89.

In the 2007 federal election the most popular party was the CVP which received 40.6% of the vote. The next three most popular parties were the SVP (27.1%), the SP (25.2%) and the FDP (5.2%).

In Schlans about 56.7% of the population (between age 25–64) have completed either non-mandatory upper secondary education or additional higher education (either university or a Fachhochschule).

Schlans has an unemployment rate of 0.69%. As of 2005, there were 7 people employed in the primary economic sector and about 4 businesses involved in this sector. No one is employed in the secondary sector. 4 people are employed in the tertiary sector, with 4 businesses in this sector.

The historical population is given in the following table:

year	population
1656	180
1836	112
1850	169
1900	174
1950	192
2000	92
