= Laax =

Laax/Lags
- Municipality
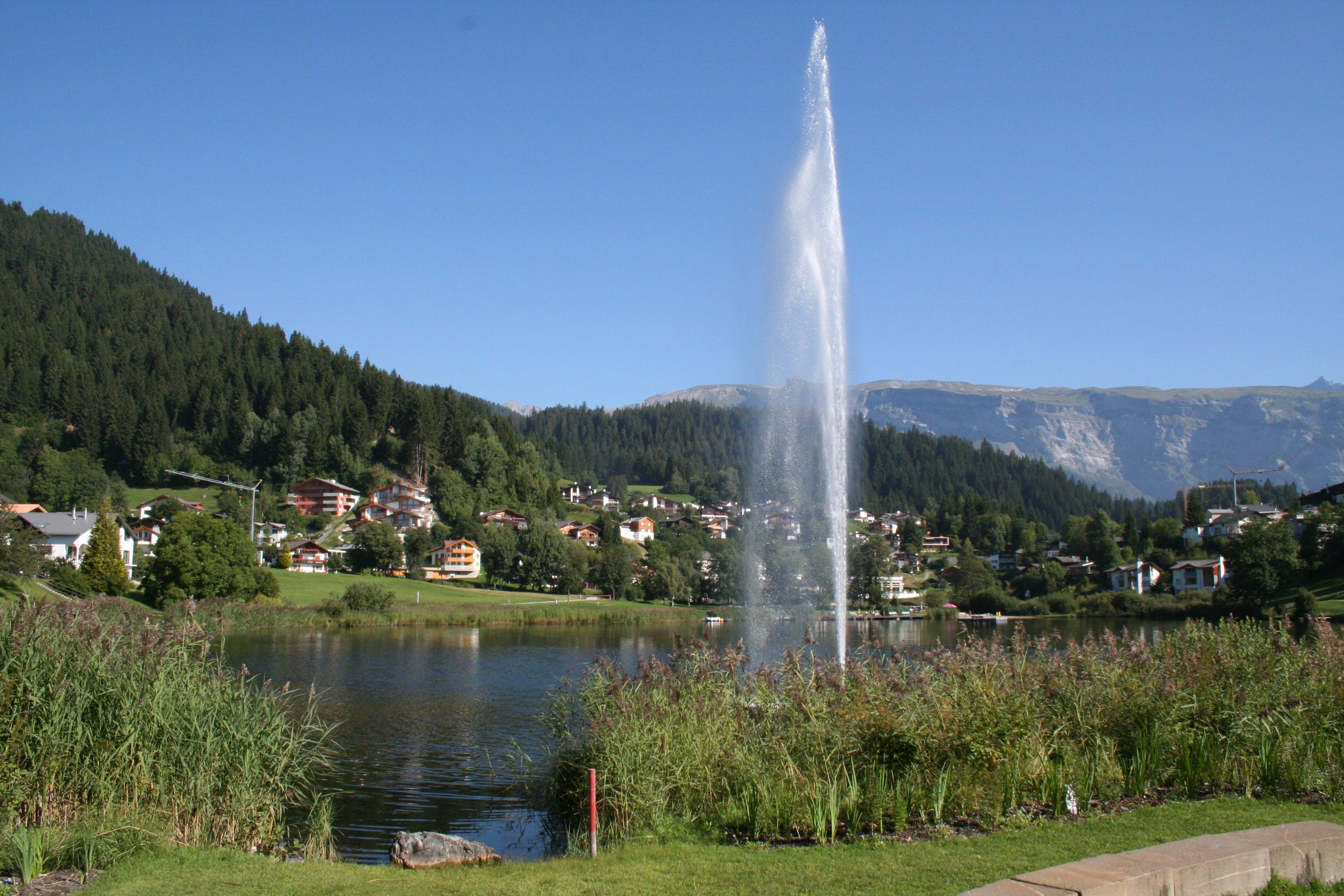
- Laax in August 2008

- Flag Coat of arms
- Location of Laax/Lags
- Location within Switzerland Location within Canton of Grisons
- Coordinates: 46°48′N 9°15′E
- Country: Switzerland
- Canton: Grisons
- District: Surselva

Area
  - Total: 31.68 km^{2} (12.23 sq mi)
- Elevation: 1,050 m (3,440 ft)

Population (December 2020)
  - Total: 1,974
  - Density: 62.31/km^{2} (161.4/sq mi)
- Time zone: UTC+01:00 (CET)
  - Summer (DST): UTC+02:00 (CEST)
- Postal code: 7031
- SFOS number: 3575
- ISO 3166 code: CH-GR
- Surrounded by: Glarus Süd (GL), Falera, Flims, Ruschein, Sagogn, Schluein
- Website: www.laax-gr.ch

Laax (German: [laːks]; Romansh: Lags, pronounced [laks]) is a municipality of the Surselva Region in the Swiss canton of the Grisons.

== History ==
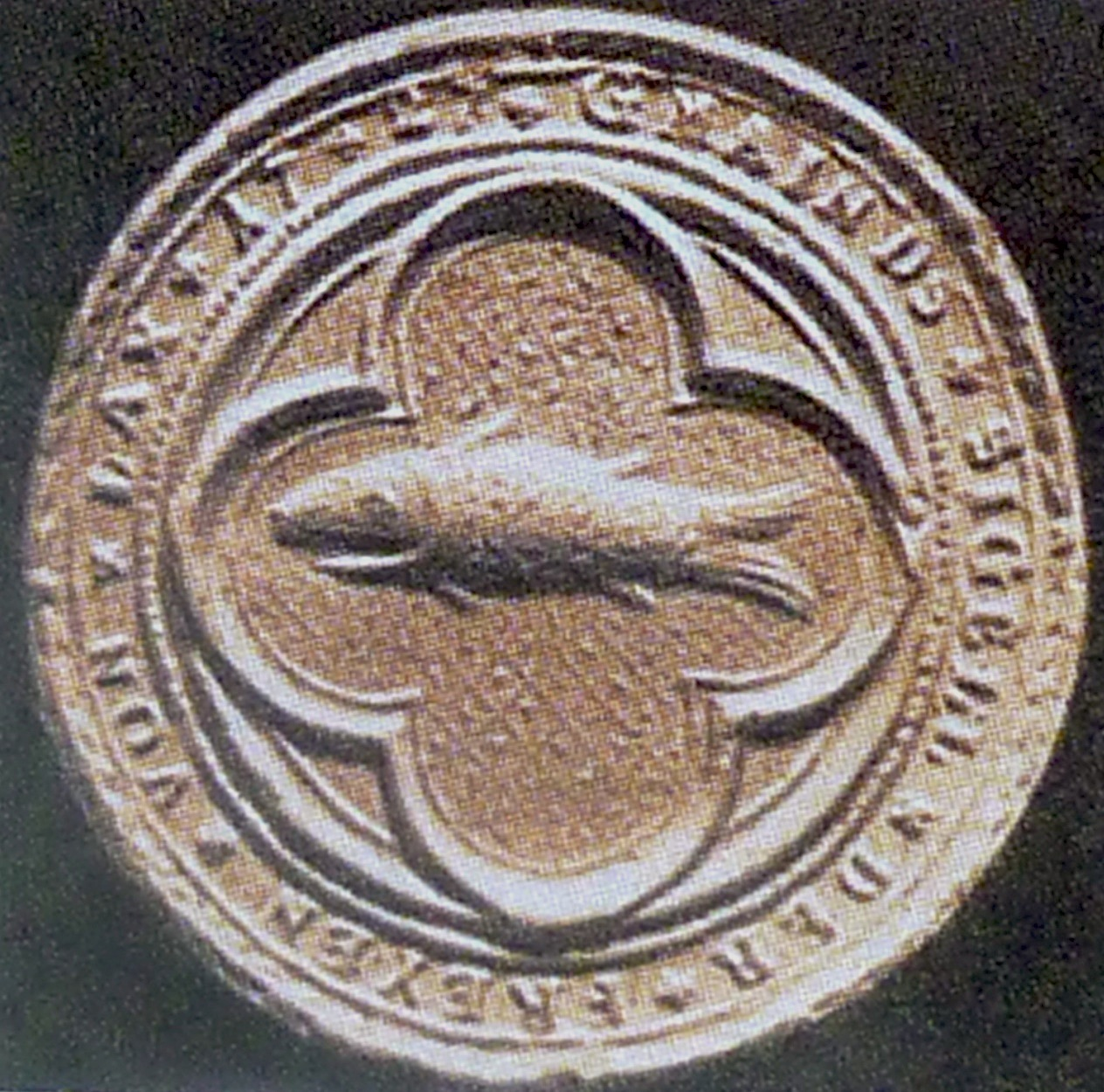
Seal of the "Freie von Laax", 1727

Laax is first undoubtedly mentioned c. 1290–98 as Lags. It was first mentioned indirectly in 765 AD when Bishop Tello of Chur granted his share of Flemme (Flims) to the Disentis Monastery, noting Laax in his will. The village appears in a 1290 register of the Cathedral of Chur and was officially independent by 1525 with its own parish church. In 1428, the de:Freie von Laax bought their freedom from Count Rudolf VII of Werdenberg-Sargans, gaining unique autonomy, freedom, and privileges such as market rights and tolls. In 1677, Udalrich de Mont, Bishop of Chur, consecrated the new church in Laax to the patrons Saint Gallus and Saint Otmar. Laax joined the Ilanz district in 1851 after the dissolution of the Laax-Seewis court, and tourism began developing in 1962 with the opening of the Crap Sogn Gion.

== Geography ==
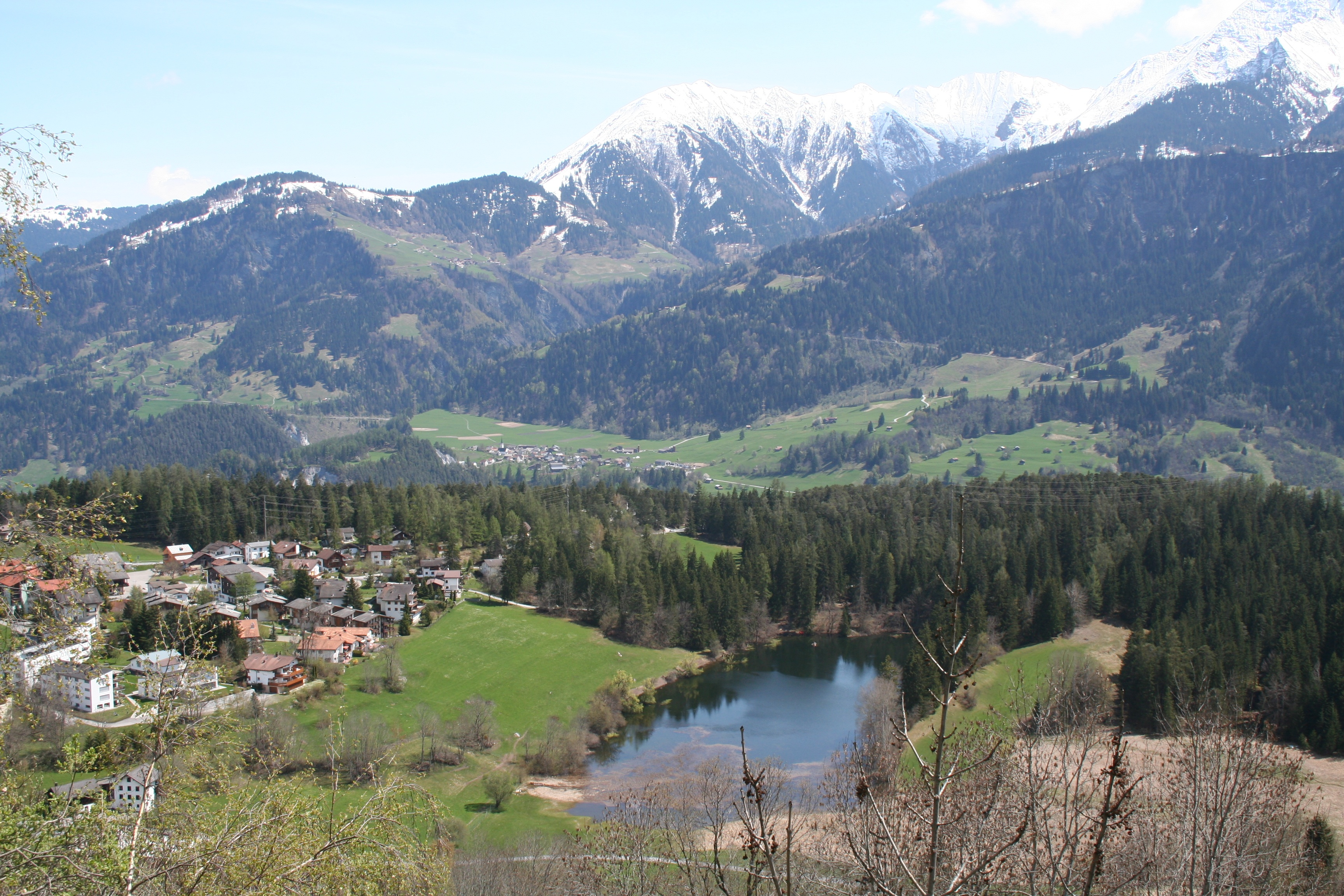
Laax Lake

Aerial view (1949)

Laax has an area, as of 2006, of 31.7 km^{2} (12.2 sq mi). Of this area, 35.8% is used for agricultural purposes, while 30.6% is forested. Of the rest of the land, 3.6% is settled (buildings or roads) and the remainder (29.9%) is non-productive (rivers, glaciers or mountains). Before 2017, the municipality was located in the Ilanz sub-district of the Surselva district, after 2017 it was part of the Surselva Region. The municipality of Laax stretches from the village itself, to Plaun and the Vorab, in the skiing area. This is all one valley and the river eventually flows to the Rhine river. It consists of the village of Laax and the hamlets of Salums, Cons, Laax Murschetg, and Laax Dorf. The ski-lifts are in Laax Murschetg.

A small lake, Laaxersee (Lag Grond), is located in the village.

The village has views of the Signina group to the south and the Flimserstein to the north. The main facilities in the village include a swimming pool, a small supermarket, a post office and several shops, including a bakery.

== Demographics ==
Laax has a population (as of 31 December 2020) of 1,974. As of 2008, 16.8% of the population was made up of foreign nationals. Over the last 10 years the population has grown at a rate of 5.8%. Most of the population (as of 2000) speaks German (50.3%), with Romansh being second most common (40.1%) and Portuguese being third (3.9%).

As of 2000, the gender distribution of the population was 51.1% male and 48.9% female. The age distribution, as of 2000, in Laax is; 102 children or 8.9% of the population are between 0 and 9 years old and 147 teenagers or 12.8% are between 10 and 19. Of the adult population, 152 people or 13.2% of the population are between 20 and 29 years old. 212 people or 18.4% are between 30 and 39, 171 people or 14.9% are between 40 and 49, and 184 people or 16.0% are between 50 and 59. The senior population distribution is 110 people or 9.6% of the population are between 60 and 69 years old, 49 people or 4.3% are between 70 and 79, there are 23 people or 2.0% who are between 80 and 89.

In the 2011 last federal election the most popular party was the CVP which received 26.9% of the vote. The next three most popular parties were the SVP (24.5%), the BDP (18.3%), and the FDP (13.3%).

The entire Swiss population is generally well educated. In Laax about 74.6% of the population (between age 25–64) have completed either non-mandatory upper secondary education or additional higher education (either university or a Fachhochschule).

Laax has an unemployment rate of 1.58%. As of 2005, there were 27 people employed in the primary economic sector and about 11 businesses involved in this sector. 61 people are employed in the secondary sector and there are 14 businesses in this sector. 521 people are employed in the tertiary sector, with 88 businesses in this sector.

From the 2000 census, 788 or 68.5% are Roman Catholic, while 240 or 20.9% belonged to the Swiss Reformed Church. Of the rest of the population, there are 12 individuals (or about 1.04% of the population) who belong to the Orthodox Church. There are 18 (or about 1.57% of the population) who are Muslims. There are 7 individuals (or about 0.61% of the population) who belong to another church (not listed on the census), 70 (or about 6.09% of the population) belong to no church, are agnostic or atheist, and 15 individuals (or about 1.30% of the population) did not answer the question.

The historical population is given in the following table:

Year	Population
1850	277
1900	280
1950	328
1970	480
2000	1,150
2010	1,551
2016	1,920

== In popular culture ==
In 2004, the resort was featured in the popular Xbox snowboarding video game which sold more than one million copies, Amped 2, and then in 2005 in the sequel Amped 3 on the Xbox 360.

== In fiction ==
The chapters No Rainbow and The Legend of The Fall in the English language novel Angel by Sebastian Michael are almost entirely set in Laax. (Optimist Books, 2009) ISBN 978-1409228967 (Hardback) ISBN 978-1409229001 (Paperback)
