= Laaxersee =

Lake in the Grisons, Switzerland

- Lag Grond
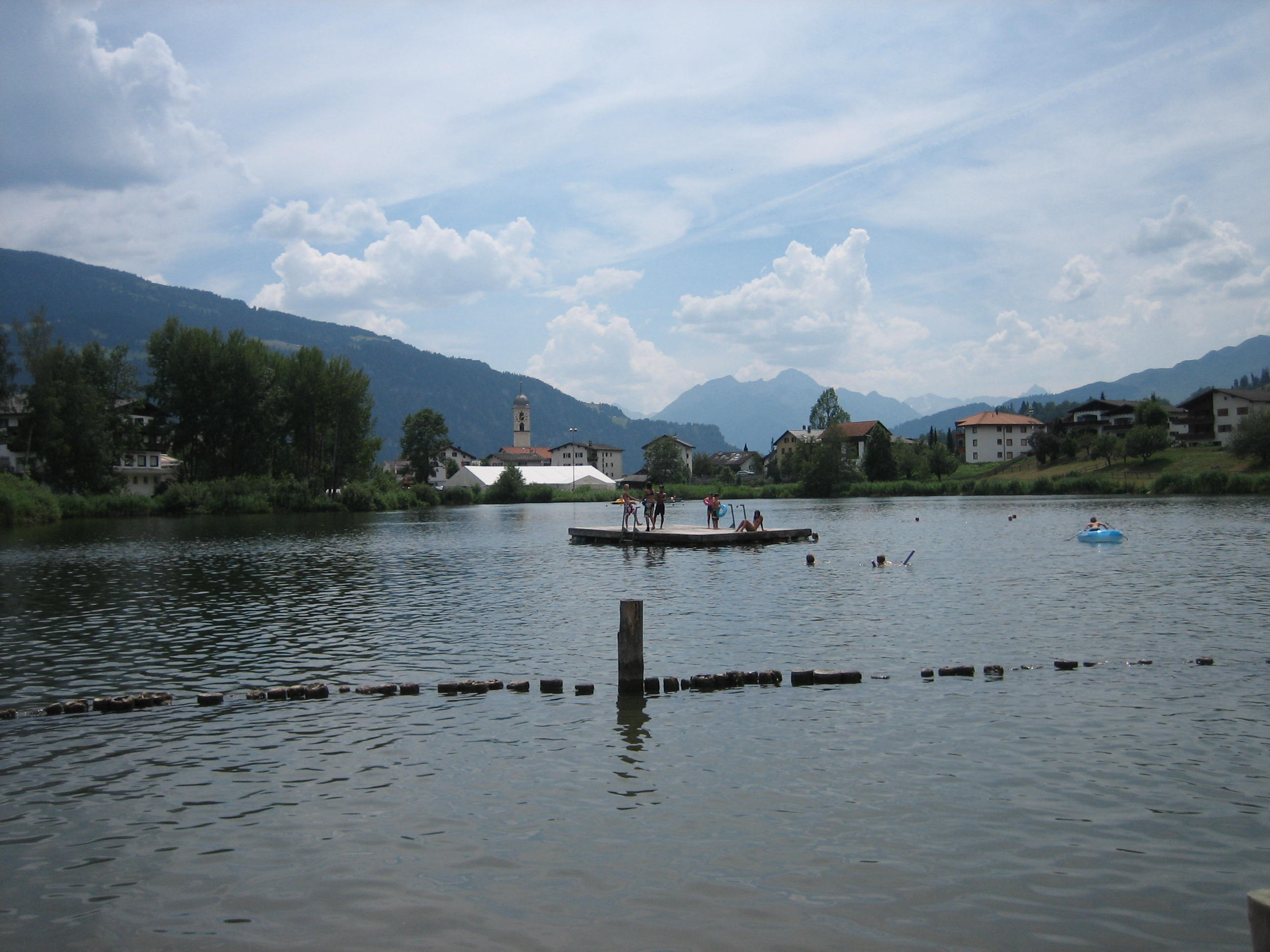

- Location within Canton of Graubünden Location within Switzerland Location within Italy Location within Alps
- Interactive map of Laaxersee
- Location: Laax, Grisons
- Coordinates: 46°48′29″N 9°15′26″E
- Basin countries: Switzerland
- Surface area: 5 ha (12 acres)
- Max. depth: 5.5 m (18 ft)
- Surface elevation: 1,016 m (3,333 ft)
- Frozen: winter

Laaxersee or Lag Grond is a lake in the village of Laax, Grisons, Switzerland. Its surface area is 5 ha (12 acres) and maximum depth 5.5 m.

Fishing season is from May 1 to September 15. In winter, the lake is generally frozen.
