= Mauro Laus =

Italian politician

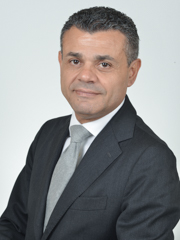

Senator of the Legislature XVIII of Italy
- Incumbent
- Assumed office March 2018
- President: Sergio Mattarella
- Constituency: Piedmont

Personal details
- Born: 7 August 1966 (age 59) Lavello
- Party: Democratic Party (Italy)

Mauro Antonio Donato Laus (b. Lavello, 7 August 1966) is an Italian politician of the Democratic Party, who serves as a Senator. He is a member of the Legislature XVIII of Italy.

== Biography ==
After spending his childhood and adolescence in Lavello (PZ), he moved to Turin. He is married and has two children.

== Political activity ==
In the 2005 regional elections in Piedmont he was elected regional councilor, on the Margherita lists, in the province of Turin. He was also re-elected in the subsequent regional 2010, in the lists of the Democratic Party. Re-elected councilor again also at the 2014 regional councils, on 30 May 2014 he was elected president of the Piedmont Regional Council.

=== Election as Senator ===
In the 2018 general elections of Italy he was elected to the Senate of the Republic in the single-member constituency of Turin, supported by the Democratic Party.

== Controversy ==
In 2018, during a heated debate in the Senate, he reportedly told Senator Alessandra Maiorino (M5S) to return to the kitchen, attracting criticism and bipartisan accusations of sexism.
