= Cumpadials =

Village in Graubünden, Switzerland

Coordinates: 46.723°N 8.921°E

View of Cumpadials

Cumpadials is the smallest of the four villages in the municipality of Sumvitg, Graubünden, Switzerland. It has a station on the Disentis - Reichenau line of the Rhätische Bahn railway.
