= Düssi =

Mountain in Switzerland

- Romansh: Piz Git
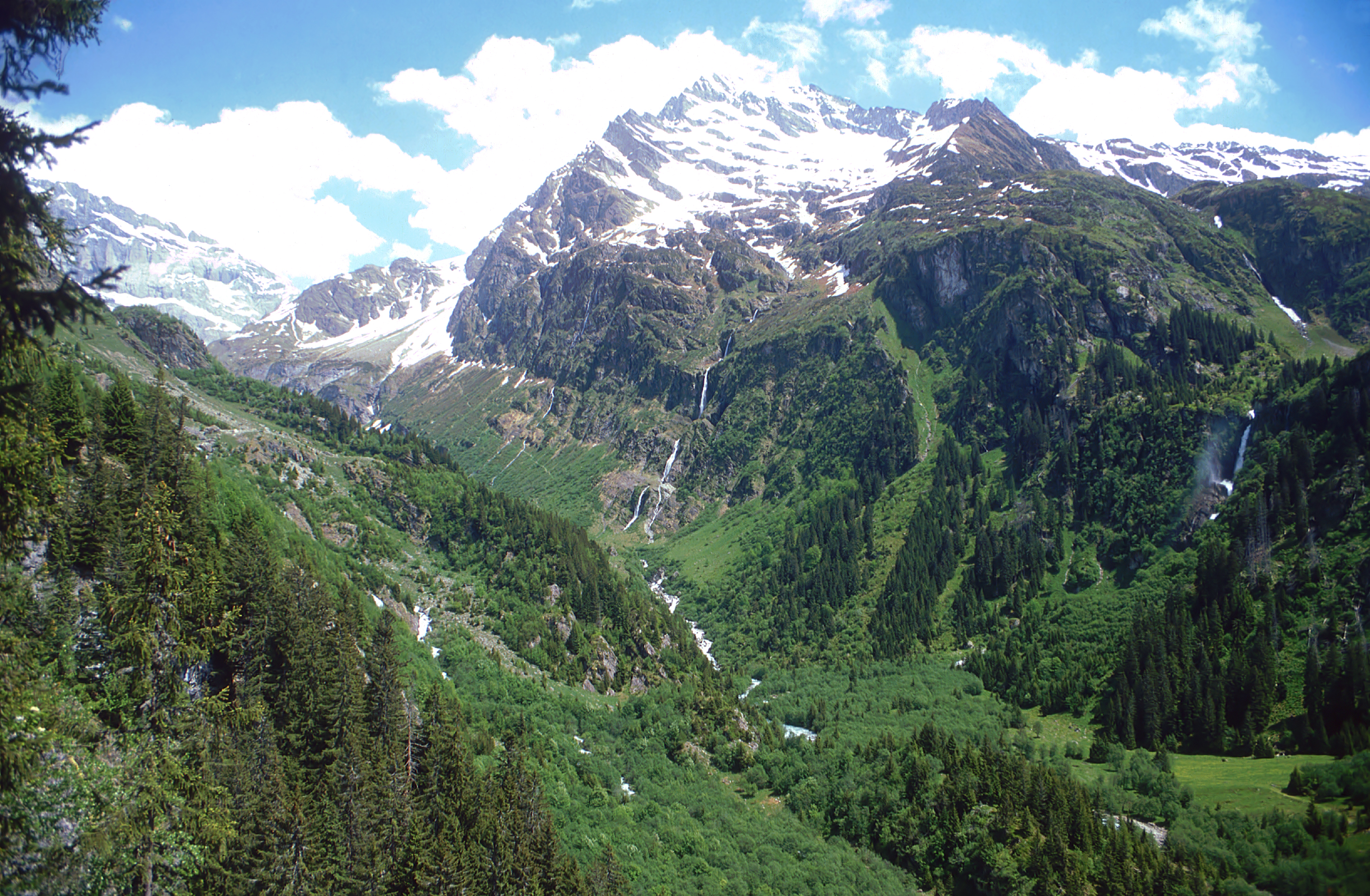
- The Düssi from the Maderanertal

Highest point
- Peak: Gross Düssi
- Elevation: 3,256 m (10,682 ft)
- Prominence: 429 m (1,407 ft)
- Parent peak: Schärhorn
- Listing: Alpine mountains above 3000 m
- Coordinates: 46°47′30.5″N 8°49′38.8″E

Geography
- Location within Switzerland
- Country: Switzerland
- Canton: Graubünden and Uri
- Parent range: Glarus Alps
- Topo map: Swiss Federal Office of Topography swisstopo

The Düssi (or Piz Git) is a mountain in the Glarus Alps in central Switzerland, located on the border between the cantons of Uri and Graubünden. Its massif separates the valleys of Maderanertal (Uri) and Val Russein (Graubünden). The summit (3,256 metres) is also named Gross Düssi to distinguish it from a lower summit to the south named Chli Düssi (3,125 metres) .

The Düssi is surrounded by glaciers, the Ober Hüfifirn on its northern side. The largest on its south-eastern side (in Graubünden) is the Glatscher da Cavrein.
