= Lag da Laus =

Lake in the Grisons, Switzerland

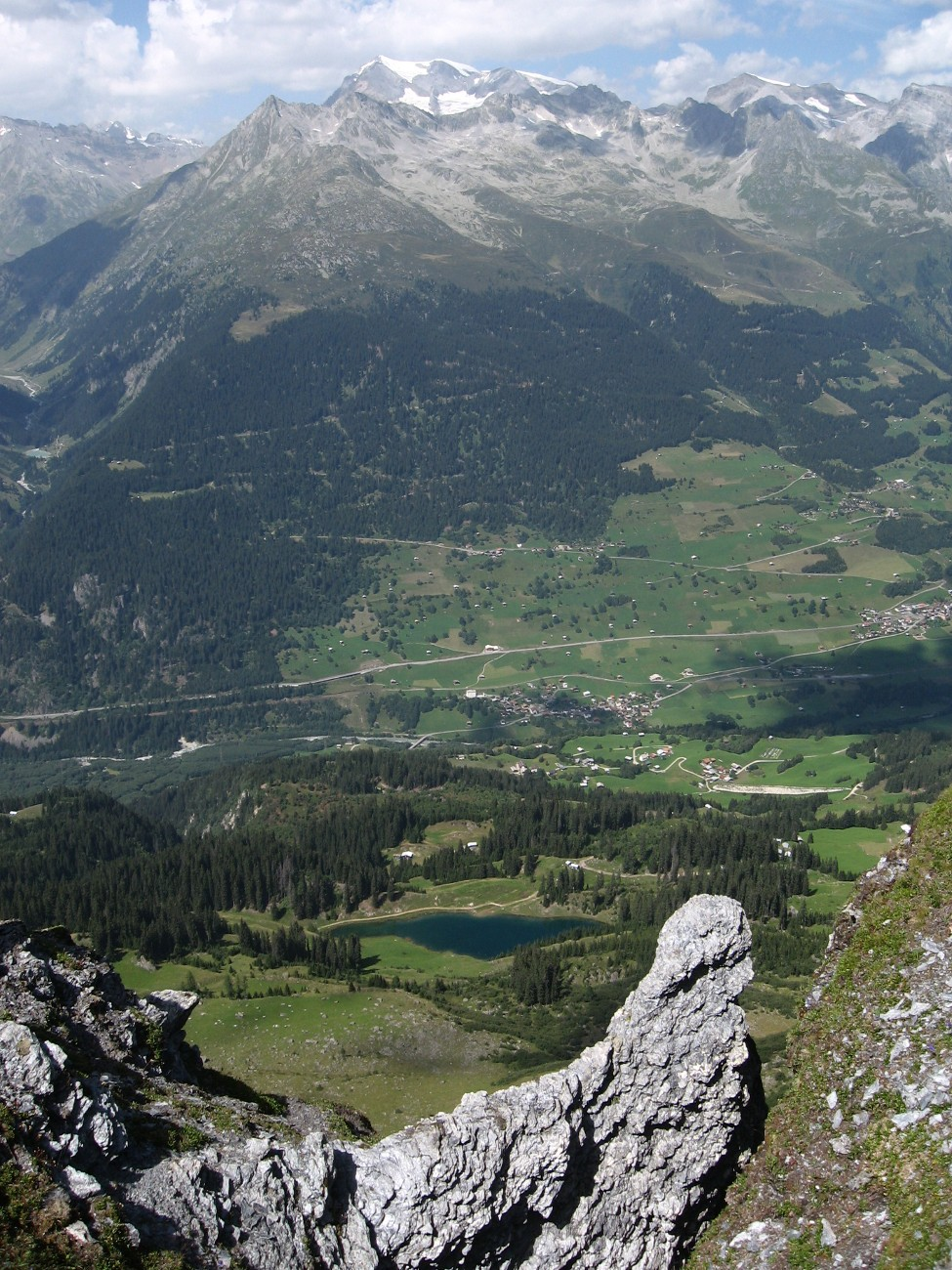
- Lag da Laus in the foreground above the Rhine valley. Tödi at the Horizon.

- Location within Canton of Graubünden Location within Switzerland Location within Alps
- Interactive map of Lag da Laus
- Location: Sumvitg, Grisons
- Coordinates: 46°42′10″N 8°54′57″E
- Type: on rockslide debris
- Primary inflows: from underground
- Primary outflows: nameless, disappears
- Basin countries: Switzerland
- Max. length: 250 m (820 ft)
- Max. width: 100 m (330 ft)
- Surface elevation: 1,614 m (5,295 ft)
- Frozen: December to March
- Islands: none
- Settlements: none

Lag da Laus (Romansh) is a small lake within the municipality of Sumvitg in the Grisons, Switzerland.

There is no real tributary to the lake and the outflow will disappear in the underground after some distance as the area consists of landslide debris. The area of the landslide can easily be spotted from the Disentis direction.

Several hiking paths or mountain bike routes lead to the area. Some people swim on hot summer days although water temperature is less than 17 degrees Celsius. In the bottom of the valley a multi day hike leads along the river Rhine.
