= Rabius-Surrein railway station =

Railway station in Switzerland

Rabius-Surrein
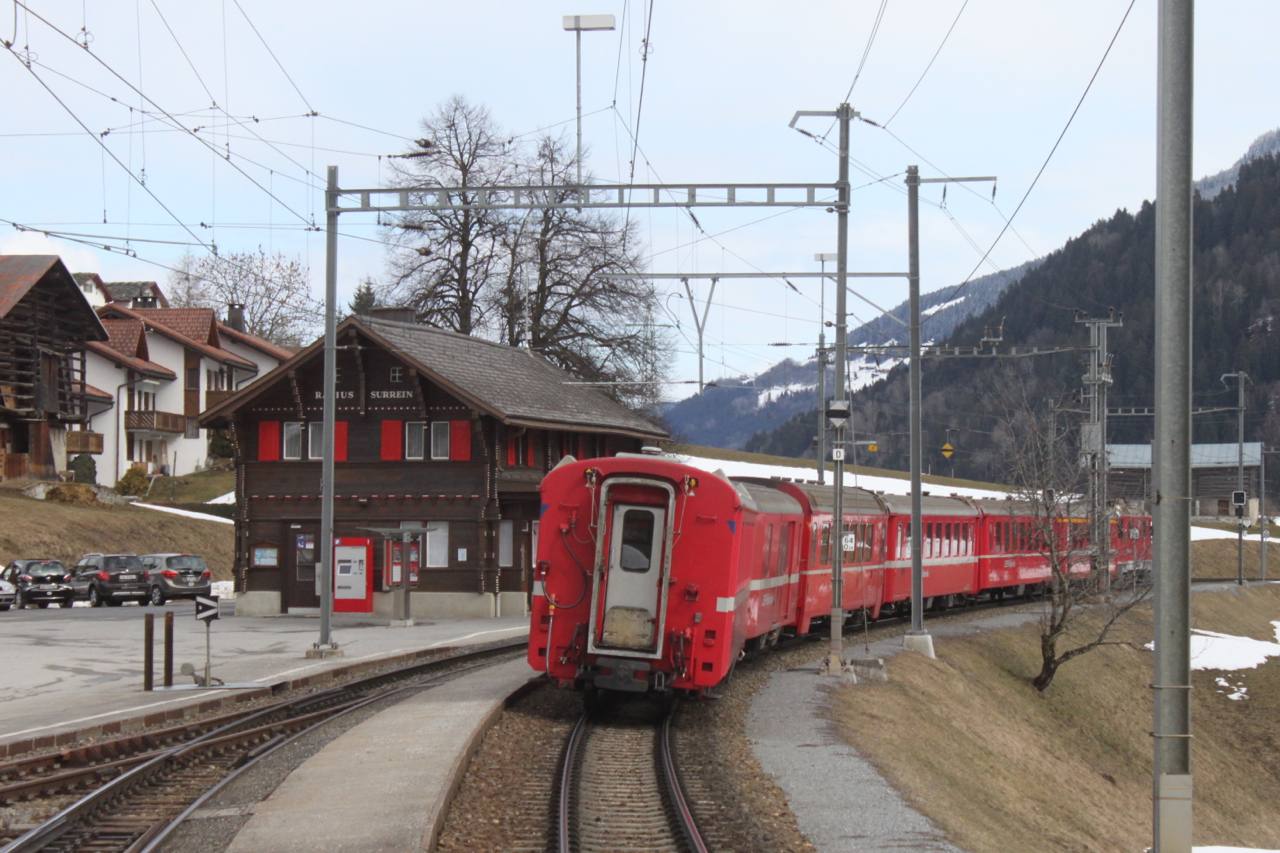
- A Rhaetian Railway train at the station in 2014

General information
- Location: Sumvitg; Switzerland
- Coordinates: 46°43′57″N 8°57′27″E
- Elevation: 928 m (3,045 ft)
- Owner: Rhaetian Railway
- Line: Reichenau-Tamins–Disentis/Mustér line
- Distance: 64.0 km (39.8 mi) from Landquart
- Train operators: Rhaetian Railway
- Connections: Sumvitg Turissem seasonal bus service

History
- Opened: 1 August 1912
- Electrified: 22 May 1922

Passengers
- 2018: 170 per weekday

Services
Preceding station	Rhaetian Railway	Following station
Sumvitg-Cumpadials towards Disentis/Mustér	RE 7	Trun towards Chur
Location

Rabius-Surrein railway station (German: Bahnhof Rabius-Surrein) is a railway station in the municipality of Sumvitg, in the Swiss canton of Graubünden. It is an intermediate stop on the 1,000 mm (3 ft 3 3/8 in) gauge Reichenau-Tamins–Disentis/Mustér line of the Rhaetian Railway.

== Services ==
As of the December 2023 timetable change, the following services stop at Rabius-Surrein:

- RegioExpress: hourly service between Disentis/Mustér and Chur.

During the summer months Sumvitg Turissem operates a weekend-only minibus to the Val Sumvitg.
