= Sumvitg =

- Municipality
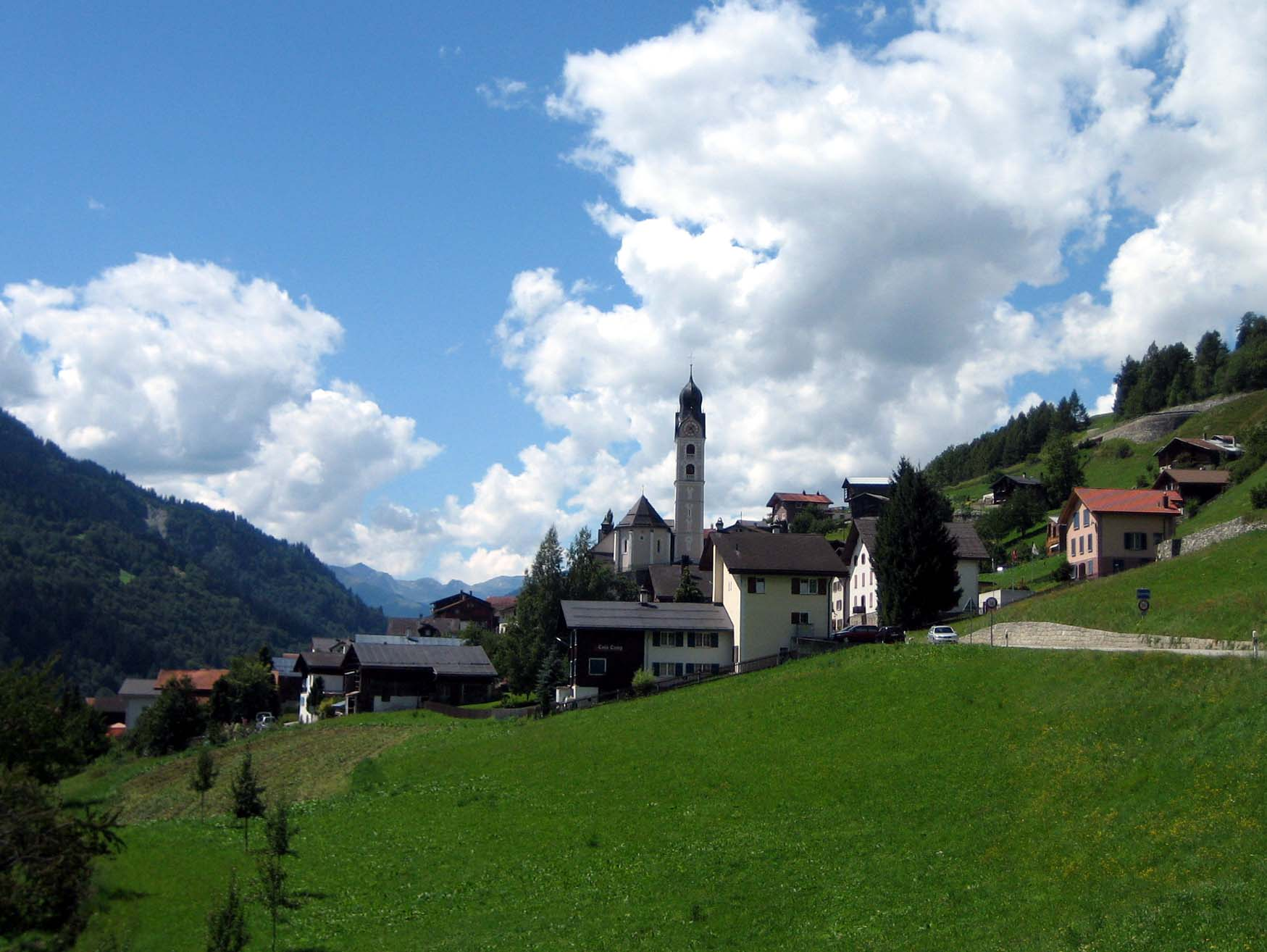

- Flag Coat of arms
- Location of Sumvitg
- Location within Switzerland Location within Canton of Grisons
- Coordinates: 46°43′N 8°56′E
- Country: Switzerland
- Canton: Grisons
- District: Surselva

Area
  - Total: 101.88 km^{2} (39.34 sq mi)
- Elevation: 1,056 m (3,465 ft)

Population (December 2020)
  - Total: 1,104
  - Density: 10.84/km^{2} (28.07/sq mi)
- Time zone: UTC+01:00 (CET)
  - Summer (DST): UTC+02:00 (CEST)
- Postal code: 7175
- SFOS number: 3985
- ISO 3166 code: CH-GR
- Localities: North of the Rhine: Cumpadials, Clavadi, Sumvitg, Siltginas, Sogn Benedetg, Runs, Luven, Rabius, Tschuppina. South of the Rhine: Pardomat-Dado, Foppas, Falens, Laus, Reits, Giachentrina, Surrein, Val, Tenigerbad
- Surrounded by: Disentis/Mustér, Linthal (Canton of Glarus), Trun, Obersaxen, Lumbrein, Vrin and Medel (Lucmagn)
- Website: www.sumvitg.ch

Sumvitg (Romansh pronunciation: [ˈsumvitɕ]; German: Somvix) is a municipality in the Surselva Region in the canton of the Grisons in Switzerland.

== History ==
Sumvitg is first mentioned in 1175 as in Summovico.

== Geography ==
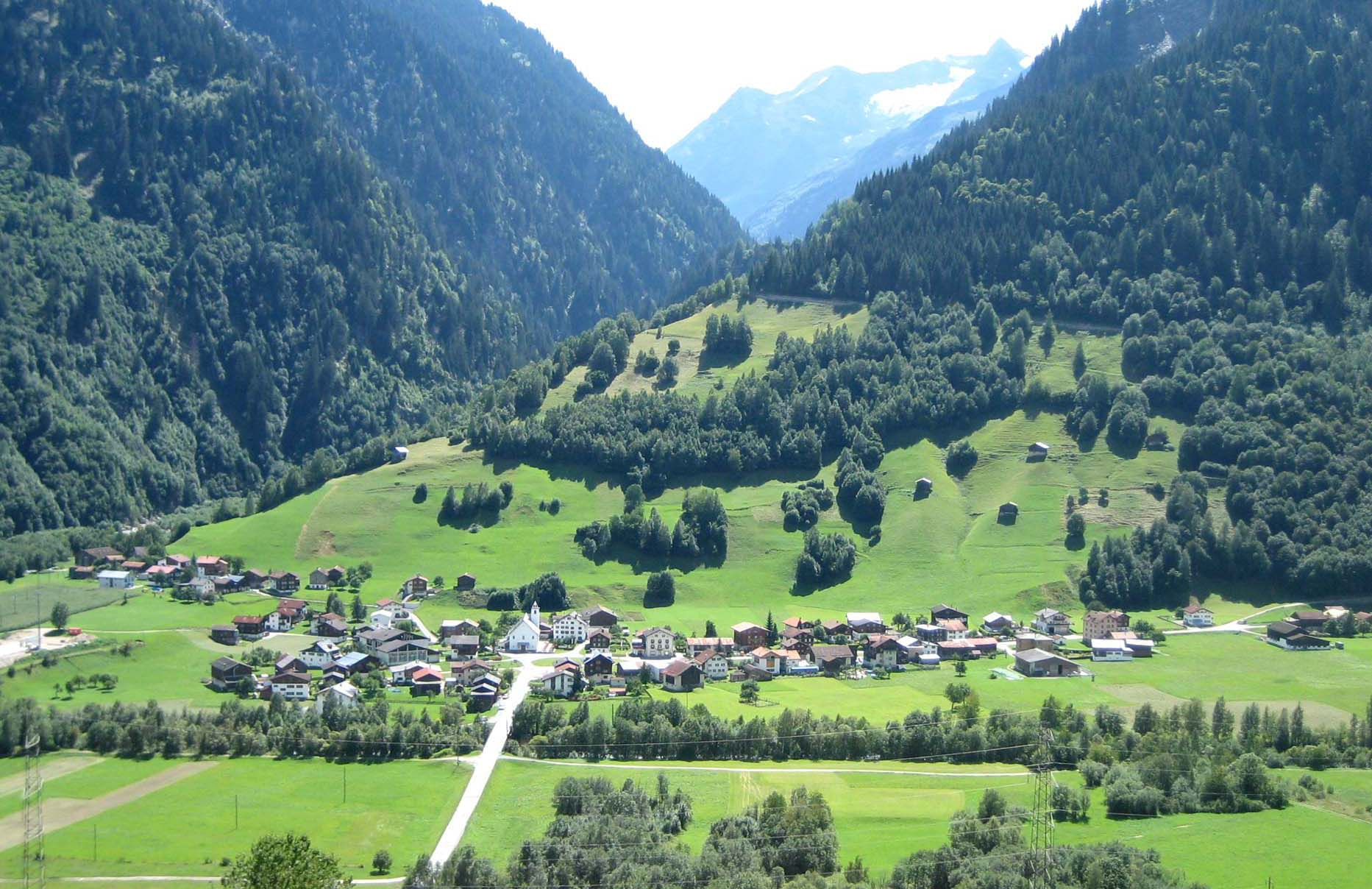
Surrein hamlet in Sumvitg

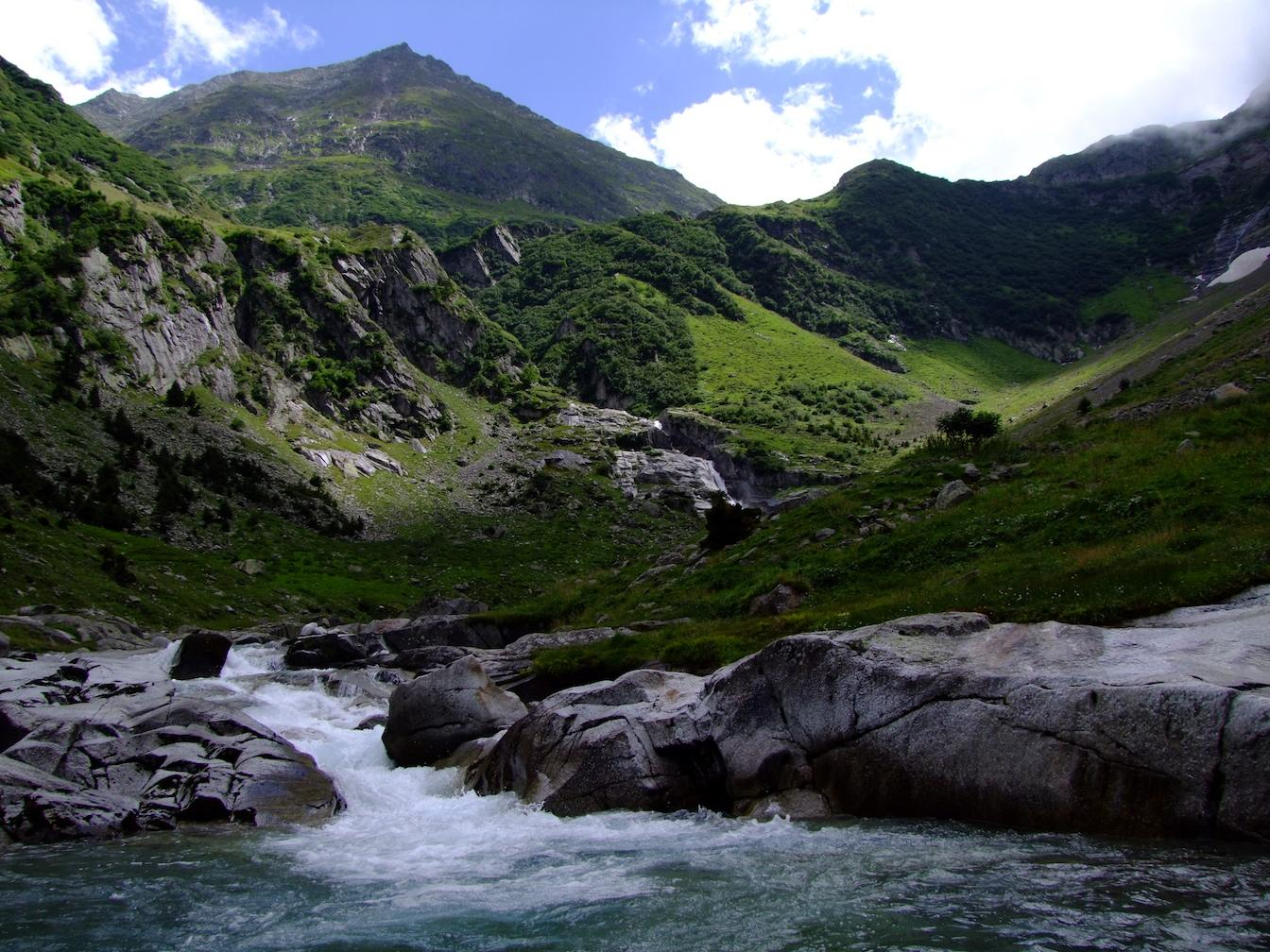
Sumvitg valley

Aerial view (1957)

Sumvitg has an area, as of 2006, of 101.8 km^{2} (39.3 sq mi). Of this area, 24.8% is used for agricultural purposes, while 26.8% is forested. Of the rest of the land, 1.3% is settled (buildings or roads) and the remainder (47.1%) is non-productive (rivers, glaciers or mountains).

Before 2017, the municipality was located in the Disentis sub-district of the Surselva district, after 2017 it was part of the Surselva Region. It covers both sides of the Vorderrhein valley and the Val Sumvitg. It consists of the village of Sumvitg and the hamlets of Surrein, Rabius, Laus and Compadials as well as numerous farm houses. Until 1986 Sumvitg was known by its German name as Somvix.

Lag da Laus (Laus lake) is located above the hamlet of Laus. South of Val Sumvitg is Piz Nadéls.

== Demographics ==
Sumvitg has a population (as of 31 December 2020) of 1,104. As of 2008, 4.5% of the population was made up of foreign nationals. Over the last 10 years the population has decreased at a rate of -7.3%. Most of the population (as of 2000) speaks Romansh(88.0%), with German being second most common (10.0%) and Italian being third ( 1.1%).

As of 2000, the gender distribution of the population was 49.1% male and 50.9% female. The age distribution in Sumvitg is; 192 children or 14.6% of the population are between 0 and 9 years old and 142 teenagers or 10.8% are between 10 and 19. Of the adult population, 84 people or 6.4% of the population are between 20 and 29 years old. 202 people or 15.4% are between 30 and 39, 143 people or 10.9% are between 40 and 49, and 160 people or 12.2% are between 50 and 59. The senior population distribution is 168 people or 12.8% of the population are between 60 and 69 years old, 149 people or 11.3% are between 70 and 79, there are 59 people or 4.5% who are between 80 and 89 there are 14 people or 1.1% who are between 90 and 99.

In the 2007 federal election the most popular party was the CVP which received 71.6% of the vote. The next three most popular parties were the SVP (14.4%), the SP (9.1%) and the FDP (4.3%).

In Sumvitg about 62.5% of the population (between age 25-64) have completed either non-mandatory upper secondary education or additional higher education (either university or a Fachhochschule).

Sumvitg has an unemployment rate of 0.67%. As of 2005, there were 119 people employed in the primary economic sector and about 47 businesses involved in this sector. 139 people are employed in the secondary sector and there are 16 businesses in this sector. 178 people are employed in the tertiary sector, with 31 businesses in this sector.

From the 2000 census, 1,199 or 91.3% are Roman Catholic, while 35 or 2.7% belonged to the Swiss Reformed Church. Of the rest of the population, there are 15 individuals (or about 1.14% of the population) who belong to another Christian church. There are 4 individuals (or about 0.30% of the population) who belong to another church (not listed on the census), 14 (or about 1.07% of the population) belong to no church, are agnostic or atheist, and 46 individuals (or about 3.50% of the population) did not answer the question.

The historical population is given in the following table:

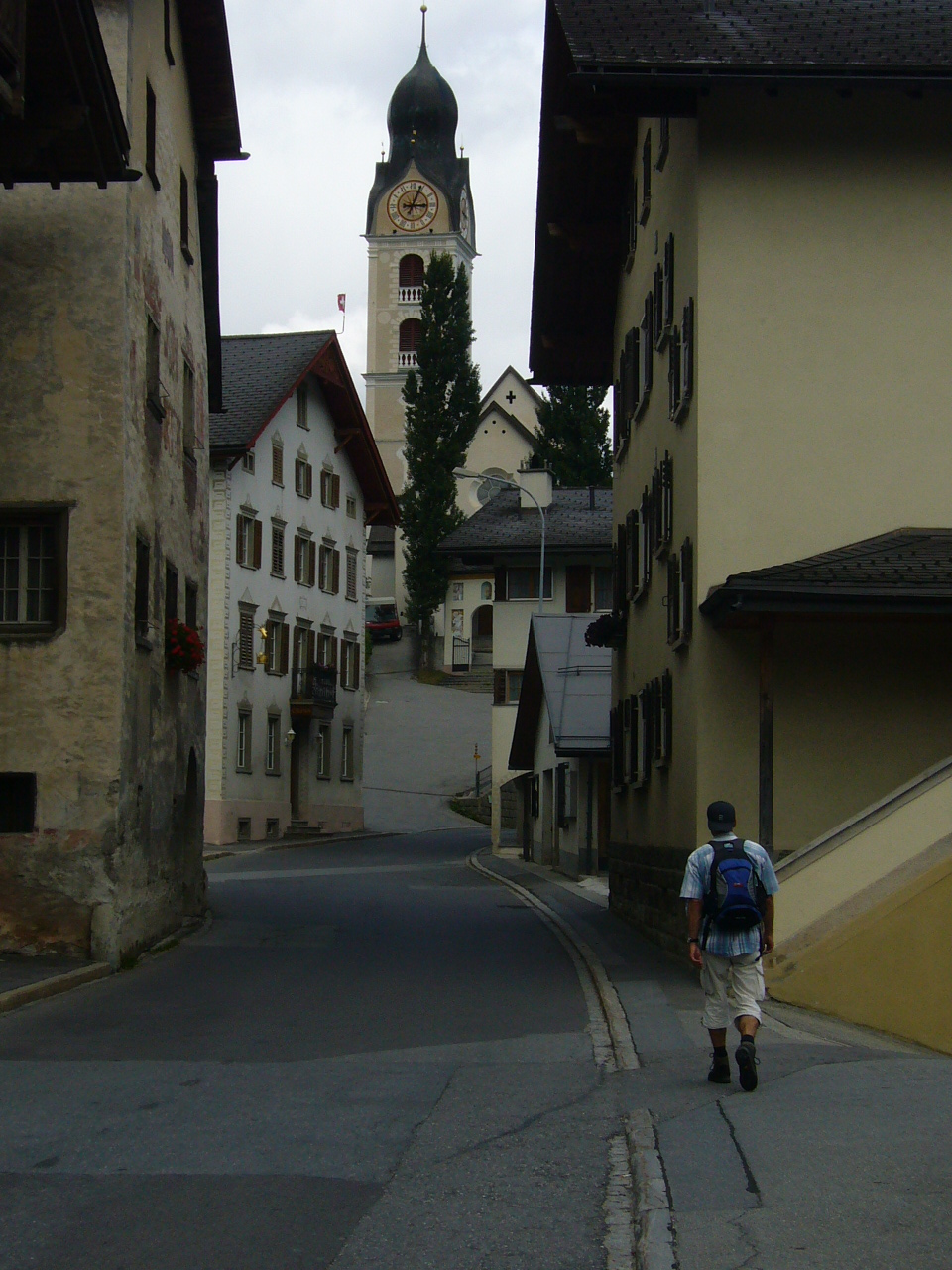
Street im Sumvitg

year	population
1850	1,353
1900	1,205
1950	1,674
1960	2,004
2000	1,313

== Heritage sites of national significance ==
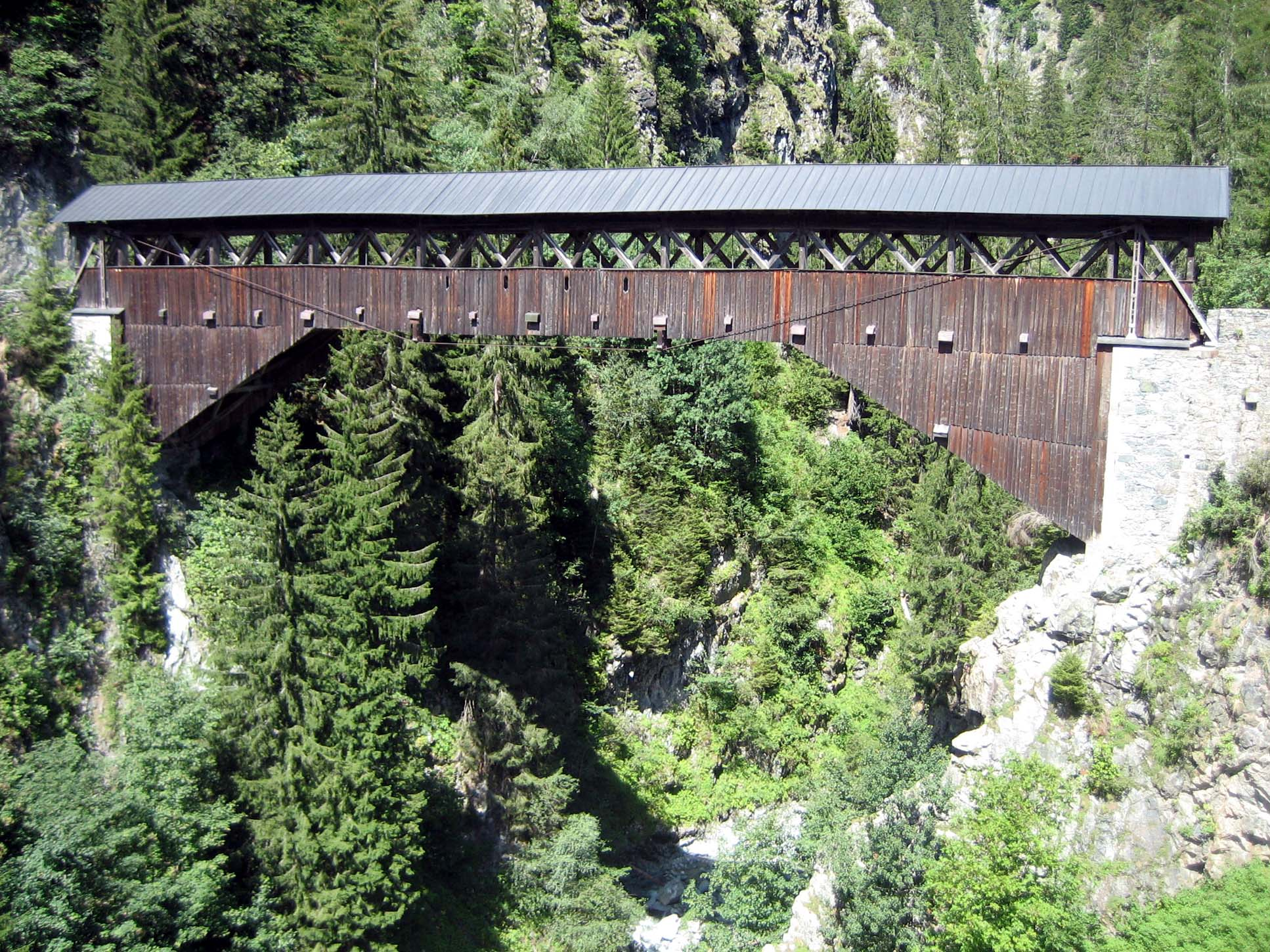
Punt Russein bridge (shared with Disentis/Mustér)

The Punt Russein bridge (shared with Disentis/Mustér) is listed as a Swiss heritage site of national significance.

== Religion ==
- St Benedict's Chapel

== Transportation ==
The municipality has two railway stations: Rabius-Surrein and Sumvitg-Cumpadials. Both are located on the Reichenau-Tamins–Disentis/Mustér line with regular service to Disentis/Mustér and Scuol-Tarasp.
