= Breil/Brigels =

- Municipality
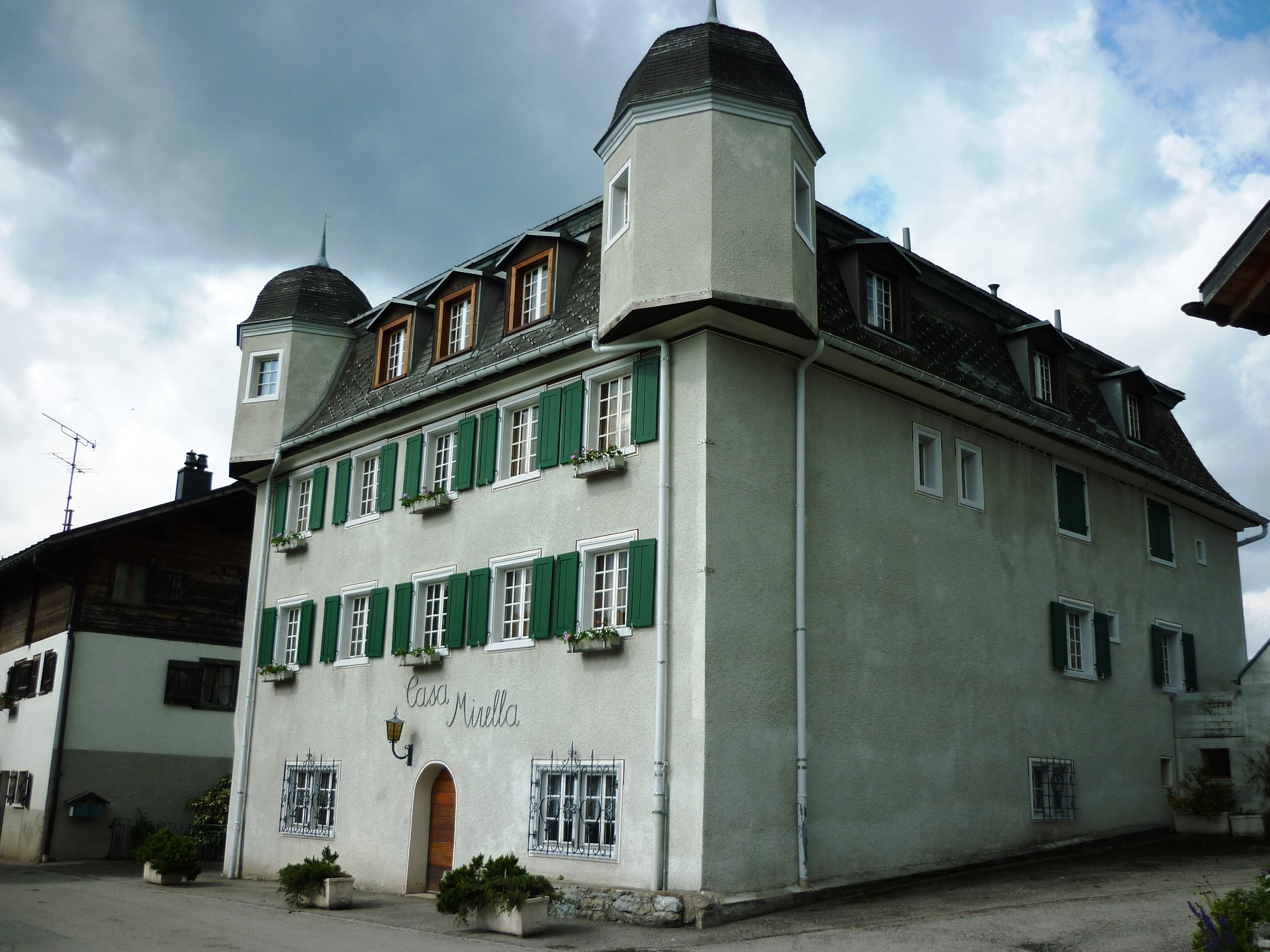
- Casa Mirella in Breil/Brigels

- Flag Coat of arms
- Location of Breil/Brigels
- Location within Switzerland Location within Canton of Grisons
- Coordinates: 46°46′N 9°3′E
- Country: Switzerland
- Canton: Grisons
- District: Surselva

Government
  - Mayor: Richard Caduff

Area
  - Total: 50.64 km^{2} (19.55 sq mi)
- Elevation: 1,280 m (4,200 ft)

Population (December 2020)
  - Total: 11,253
  - Density: 222.2/km^{2} (575.5/sq mi)
- Time zone: UTC+01:00 (CET)
  - Summer (DST): UTC+02:00 (CEST)
- Postal code: 7165
- SFOS number: 3981
- ISO 3166 code: CH-GR
- Surrounded by: Linthal (GL), Obersaxen, Schlans, Trun, Waltensburg/Vuorz
- Twin towns: Gammelshausen (Germany)
- Website: www.breil.ch

Breil/Brigels is a municipality in the Surselva Region in the Swiss canton of the Grisons. On 1 January 2018 the former municipalities of Andiast and Waltensburg/Vuorz merged into the municipality of Breil/Brigels.

The name of the municipality comes from the word brigilo, meaning 'little town'. The name comes from the village name in the two local languages. In Romansh the name is Breil [bʁɔjl] while in German it is Brigels [ˈbriːɡl̩s].

== History ==
Aerial view from 500 m by Walter Mittelholzer (1923)

While the area was settled in the late Roman era or Early Middle Ages, Breil/Brigels is first mentioned in 765 as in Bregelo when the Bishop of Chur granted a farm in Breil/Brigels to Disentis Abbey. Shortly thereafter, the Abbey established a church and fortification on St. Eusebius' hill near the village. The village church of S. Maria and the chapel of S. Sievi (Chaplutta Son Sievi) both came under control of the Abbey in 1185 at the order of the Pope. New immigrants, known as the Freie von Laax, moved into the village during the Middle Ages which weakened the power of the Abbey. In the early 14th Century, the pro-Habsburg Abbot Hugo III of Werdenberg marched into the valley to reestablish his authority, but was forced out in 1327. Following a fire which destroyed much of the Abbey in 1387, the Abbot Johannes of Ilanz sold his alpine pastures in Breil/Brigels to pay for the reconstruction. In 1491, the village of church of S. Maria was raised to a parish church. Then, in 1496 the Abbey church and fort on St. Eusebius' hill both burned to the ground and were not rebuilt. During the plague of 1550 the village had 316 deaths. Six years later the plague struck again, killing 180 and in 1631 a third plague killed 130. In 1738, the village became free of the obligation to provide tithes to the church.

== Geography ==
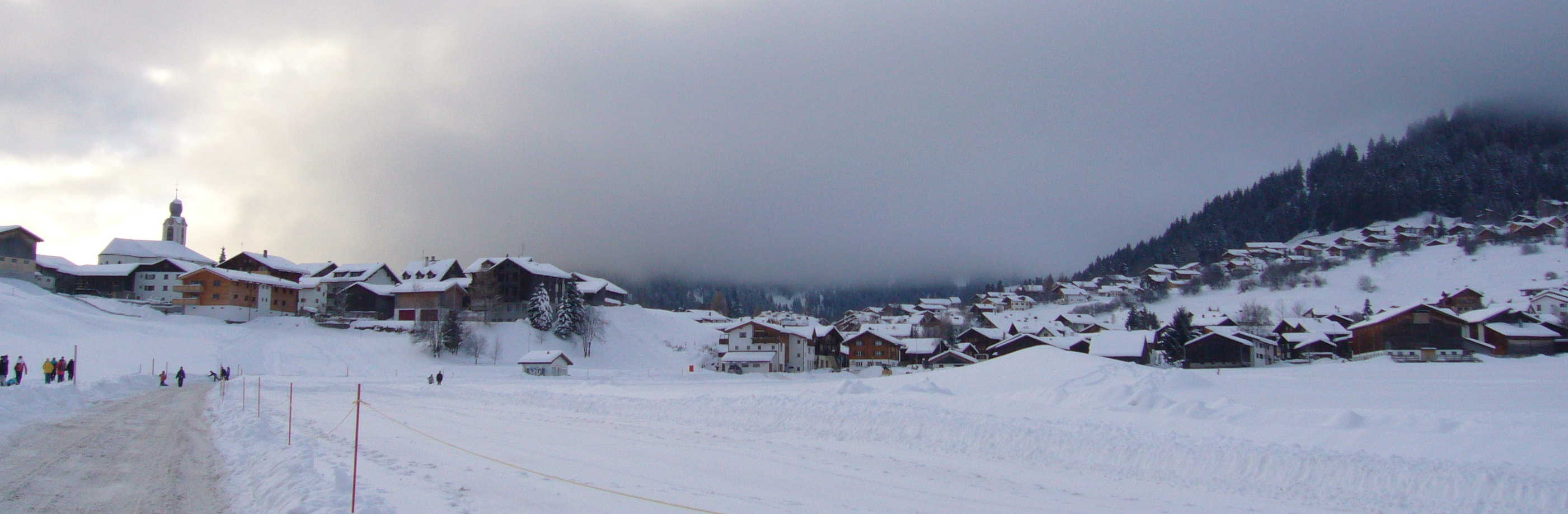
View of Briel/Brigels in the snow

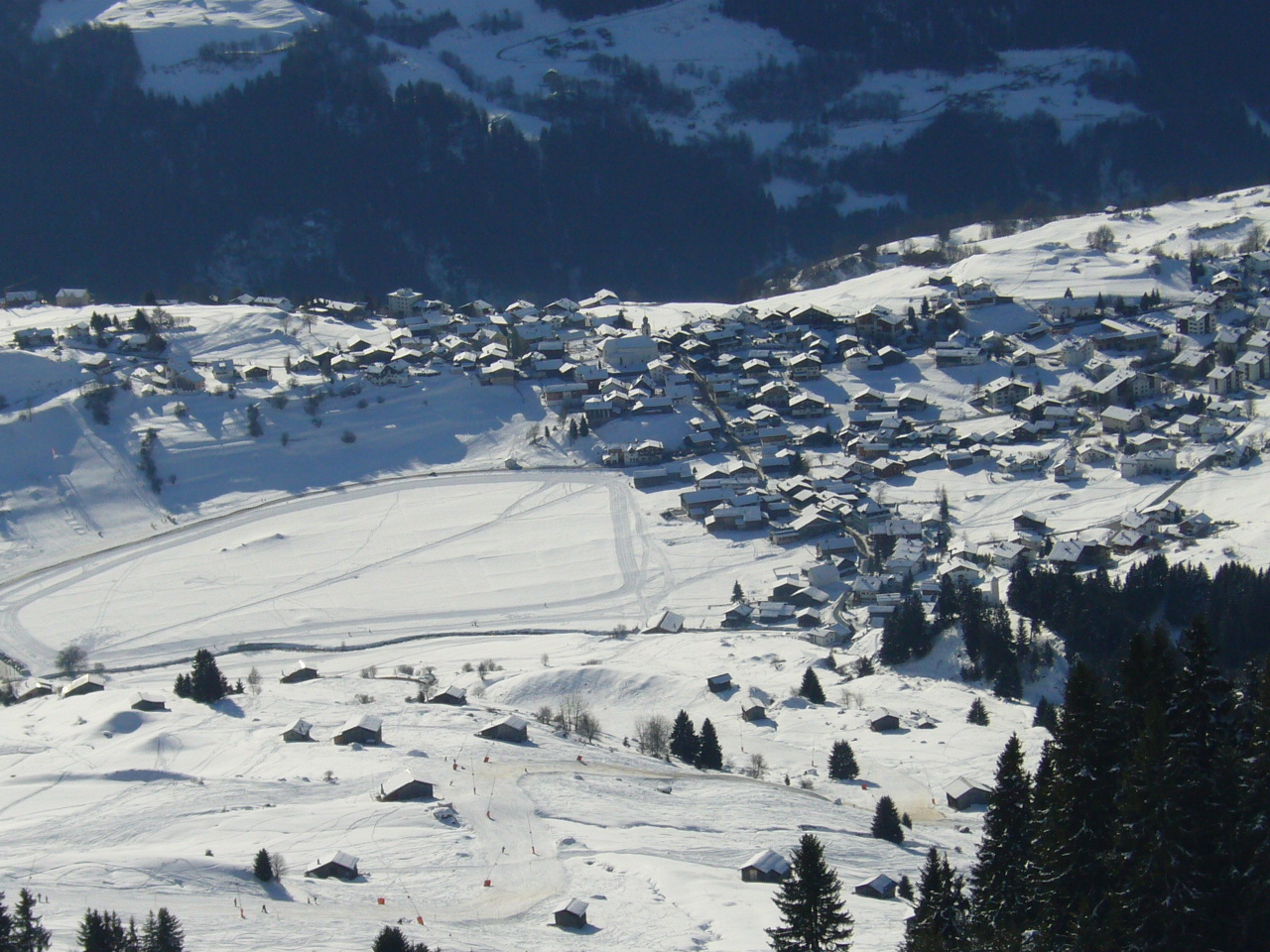
Briel/Brigels and Lag da Breil from above, showing the terrace on which the village is built.

Breil/Brigels has an area, as of 2006, of 50.8 km^{2} (19.6 sq mi). Of this area, 35.2% is used for agricultural purposes, while 23.5% is forested. Of the rest of the land, 2.4% is settled (buildings or roads) and the remainder (38.9%) is non-productive (rivers, glaciers or mountains).

Before 2017, the municipality was located in the Disentis sub-district of the Surselva district, after 2017 it was part of the Surselva Region. It consists of the village of Breil/Brigels on a terrace north of the Vorderrhein valley and the hamlets of Dardin-Capeder (Dardin) below the village and Danis-Tavanasa (Danis, Tavanasa) on the valley floor. Until 1943 Breil/Brigels was known as Brigels.

== Demographics ==
Breil/Brigels has a population (as of 31 December 2020) of 11,253. As of 2008, 4.7% of the population was made up of foreign nationals. Over the last 10 years the population has decreased at a rate of -0.1%.

As of 2000, the gender distribution of the population was 50.6% male and 49.4% female. The age distribution, as of 2000, in Breil/Brigels is; 145 children or 12.2% of the population are between 0 and 9 years old and 167 teenagers or 14.1% are between 10 and 19. Of the adult population, 98 people or 8.3% of the population are between 20 and 29 years old. 195 people or 16.4% are between 30 and 39, 139 people or 11.7% are between 40 and 49, and 133 people or 11.2% are between 50 and 59. The senior population distribution is 160 people or 13.5% of the population are between 60 and 69 years old, 103 people or 8.7% are between 70 and 79, there are 43 people or 3.6% who are between 80 and 89 there are 4 people or 0.3% who are between 90 and 99.

In the 2007 federal election the most popular party was the CVP which received 67.8% of the vote. The next three most popular parties were the SVP (18.2%), the FDP (7.1%) and the SP (6.6%).

The entire Swiss population is generally well educated. In Breil/Brigels about 61.6% of the population (between age 25-64) have completed either non-mandatory upper secondary education or additional higher education (either university or a Fachhochschule).

Breil/Brigels has an unemployment rate of 1.14%. As of 2005, there were 90 people employed in the primary economic sector and about 37 businesses involved in this sector. 108 people are employed in the secondary sector and there are 15 businesses in this sector. 280 people are employed in the tertiary sector, with 62 businesses in this sector.

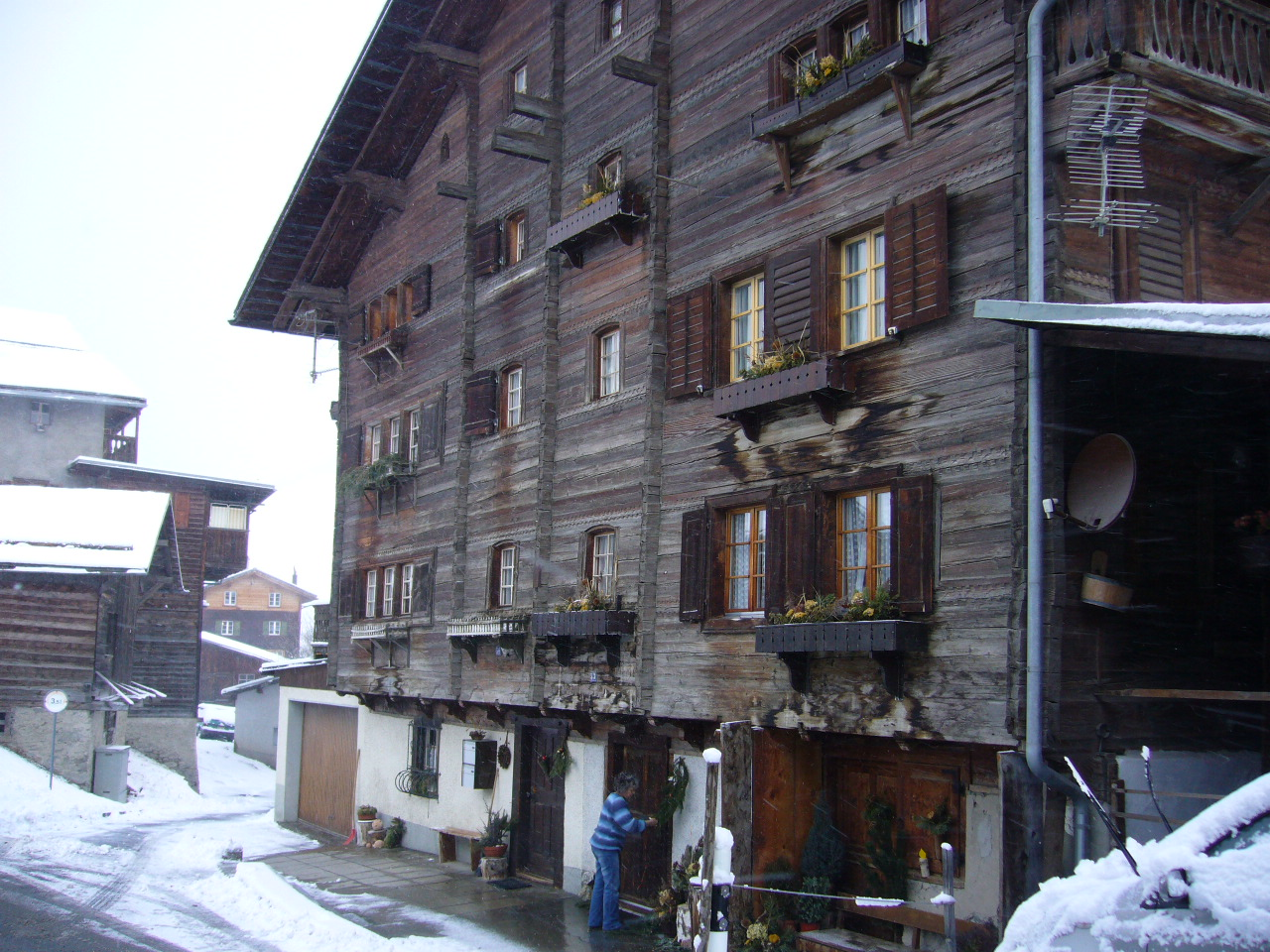
Typical house in the village

The historical population is given in the following table:

year	population
1850	1,086
1888	848
1900	859
1910	1,033
1950	1,169
1960	1,272
2000	1,187

== Language ==
Most of the population (as of 2000) speaks Sursilvan Romansh (80.5%), with German being second most common (14.3%) and Italian being third (1.5%).

== Religion ==
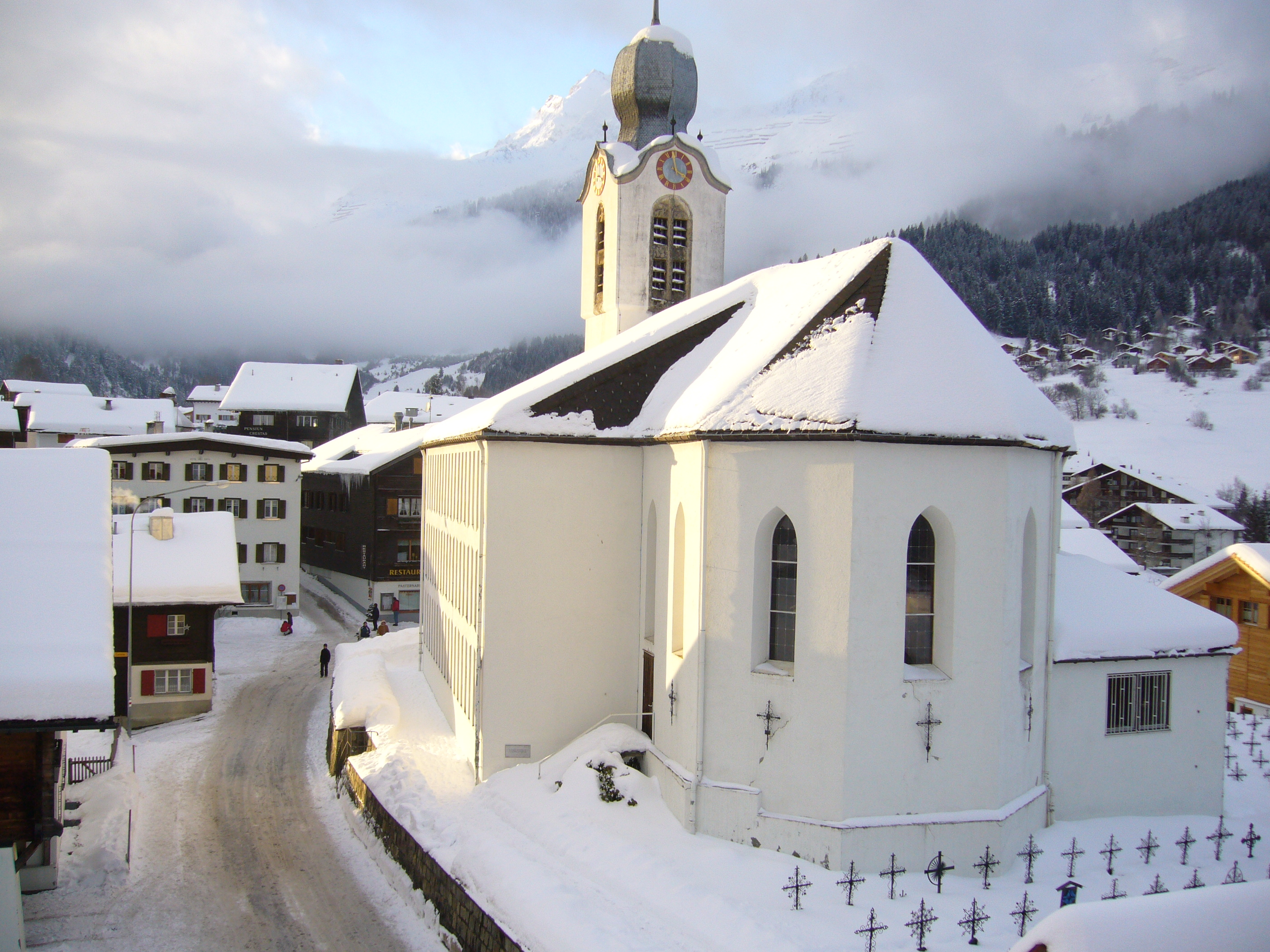
Village church of Breil/Brigels

From the 2000 census, 1,044 or 88.0% are Roman Catholic, while 57 or 4.8% belonged to the Swiss Reformed Church. Of the rest of the population, there are 10 individuals (or about 0.84% of the population) who belong to the Orthodox Church, and there are 9 individuals (or about 0.76% of the population) who belong to another Christian church. There are 13 (or about 1.10% of the population) who are Islamic. 20 (or about 1.68% of the population) belong to no church, are agnostic or atheist, and 34 individuals (or about 2.86% of the population) did not answer the question.

The Protestant Reformation did not catch on in the municipality because of the influence of the nearby Disentis Abbey.

== Heritage sites of national significance ==
The Chaplutta Son Sievi is listed as a Swiss heritage site of national significance.

== Transportation ==
The municipality has two railway stations: Waltensburg/Vuorz and Tavanasa-Breil/Brigels. Both are located on the Reichenau-Tamins–Disentis/Mustér line with regular service to Disentis/Mustér and Scuol-Tarasp.
