= Trun, Switzerland =

Trun
- Municipality
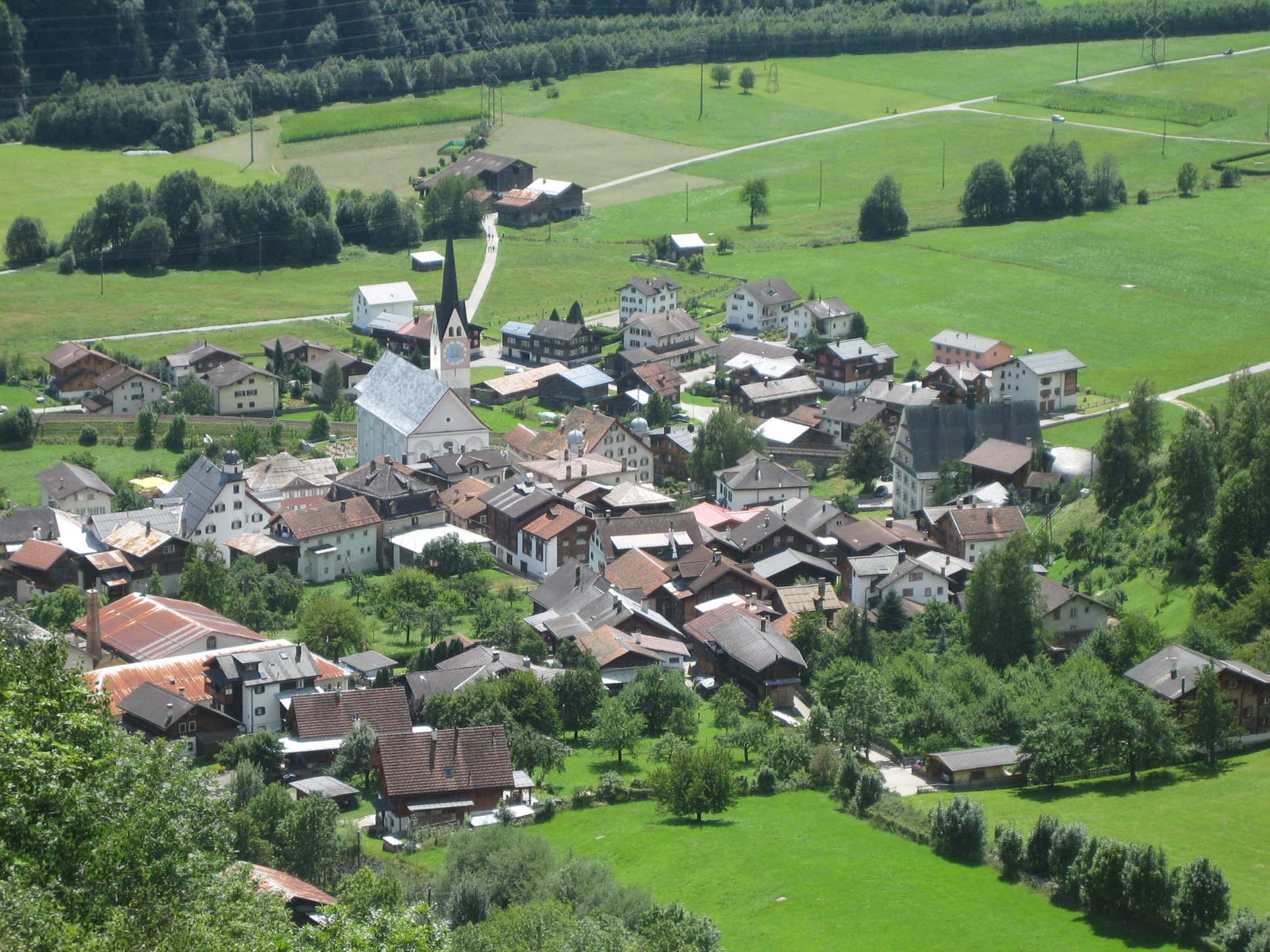

- Flag Coat of arms
- Location of Trun
- Location within Switzerland Location within Canton of Grisons
- Coordinates: 46°44′N 8°59′E
- Country: Switzerland
- Canton: Grisons
- District: Surselva

Area
  - Total: 41.9 km^{2} (16.2 sq mi)
- Elevation: 861 m (2,825 ft)

Population (December 2020)
  - Total: 1,161
  - Density: 27.7/km^{2} (71.8/sq mi)
- Time zone: UTC+01:00 (CET)
  - Summer (DST): UTC+02:00 (CEST)
- Postal code: 7166
- SFOS number: 3987
- ISO 3166 code: CH-GR
- Surrounded by: Breil/Brigels, Linthal (GL), Obersaxen, Schlans, Sumvitg
- Website: www.trun.ch

Trun is a municipality in the Surselva Region in the canton of the Grisons in Switzerland. The municipality of Schlans merged on 1 January 2012 into the municipality of Trun.

The village was formerly known as Truns and is referred to by that name in some older sources.

== History ==
Trun is first mentioned in 765 as Tauronto.

== Geography ==
Aerial view (1957)

Trun has an area, as of 2006, of 43.1 km^{2} (16.6 sq mi). Of this area, 23.6% is used for agricultural purposes, while 34% is forested. Of the rest of the land, 1.9% is settled (buildings or roads) and the remainder (40.5%) is non-productive (rivers, glaciers or mountains). Following the 2012 merger, the new area was 51.9 km^{2} (20.0 sq mi).

Before 2017, the municipality was located in the Disentis sub-district of the Surselva district, after 2017 it was part of the Surselva Region. It consists of the village of Trun and the hamlets and settlements of Cumadé, Bardigliun, Campliun, Gravas, Caltgadira, Cartatscha, Flutginas, Darvella, Dadens as well as the village section of Zignau. The municipality is in a hazardous location, avalanches (Munt, Cavistrau), rock slides and flooding (Zavragia, Zinzera and Rhein rivers) all threaten the village. Until 1943 Trun was known as Truns.

== Demographics ==
Trun has a population (as of 31 December 2020) of 1,161. As of 2008, 5.1% of the population was made up of foreign nationals. Over the last 10 years the population has decreased at a rate of -10.2%. Most of the population (as of 2000) speaks Romansh (79.0%), with German being second most common (14.9%) and Italian being third (3.7%).

As of 2000, the gender distribution of the population was 48.5% male and 51.5% female. The age distribution, as of 2000, in Trun is; 156 children or 11.8% of the population are between 0 and 9 years old and 175 teenagers or 13.2% are between 10 and 19. Of the adult population, 106 people or 8.0% of the population are between 20 and 29 years old. 201 people or 15.2% are between 30 and 39, 176 people or 13.3% are between 40 and 49, and 118 people or 8.9% are between 50 and 59. The senior population distribution is 177 people or 13.4% of the population are between 60 and 69 years old, 117 people or 8.9% are between 70 and 79, there are 82 people or 6.2% who are between 80 and 89 there are 14 people or 1.1% who are between 90 and 99.

In the 2007 federal election the most popular party was the CVP which received 67.4% of the vote. The next three most popular parties were the SVP (12.4%), the FDP (9.8%) and the SP (8.9%).

In Trun about 64.4% of the population (between age 25-64) have completed either non-mandatory upper secondary education or additional higher education (either university or a Fachhochschule).

Trun has an unemployment rate of 0.47%. As of 2005, there were 58 people employed in the primary economic sector and about 24 businesses involved in this sector. 103 people are employed in the secondary sector and there are 21 businesses in this sector. 288 people are employed in the tertiary sector, with 45 businesses in this sector.

From the 2000 census, 1,199 or 90.7% are Roman Catholic, while 38 or 2.9% belonged to the Swiss Reformed Church. Of the rest of the population, there are 5 individuals (or about 0.38% of the population) who belong to the Orthodox Church, and there are 15 individuals (or about 1.13% of the population) who belong to another Christian church. There are 15 (or about 1.13% of the population) who are Islamic. There are 1 individual (or about 0.08% of the population) who belong to another church (not listed on the census), 31 (or about 2.34% of the population) belong to no church, are agnostic or atheist, and 18 individuals (or about 1.36% of the population) did not answer the question.

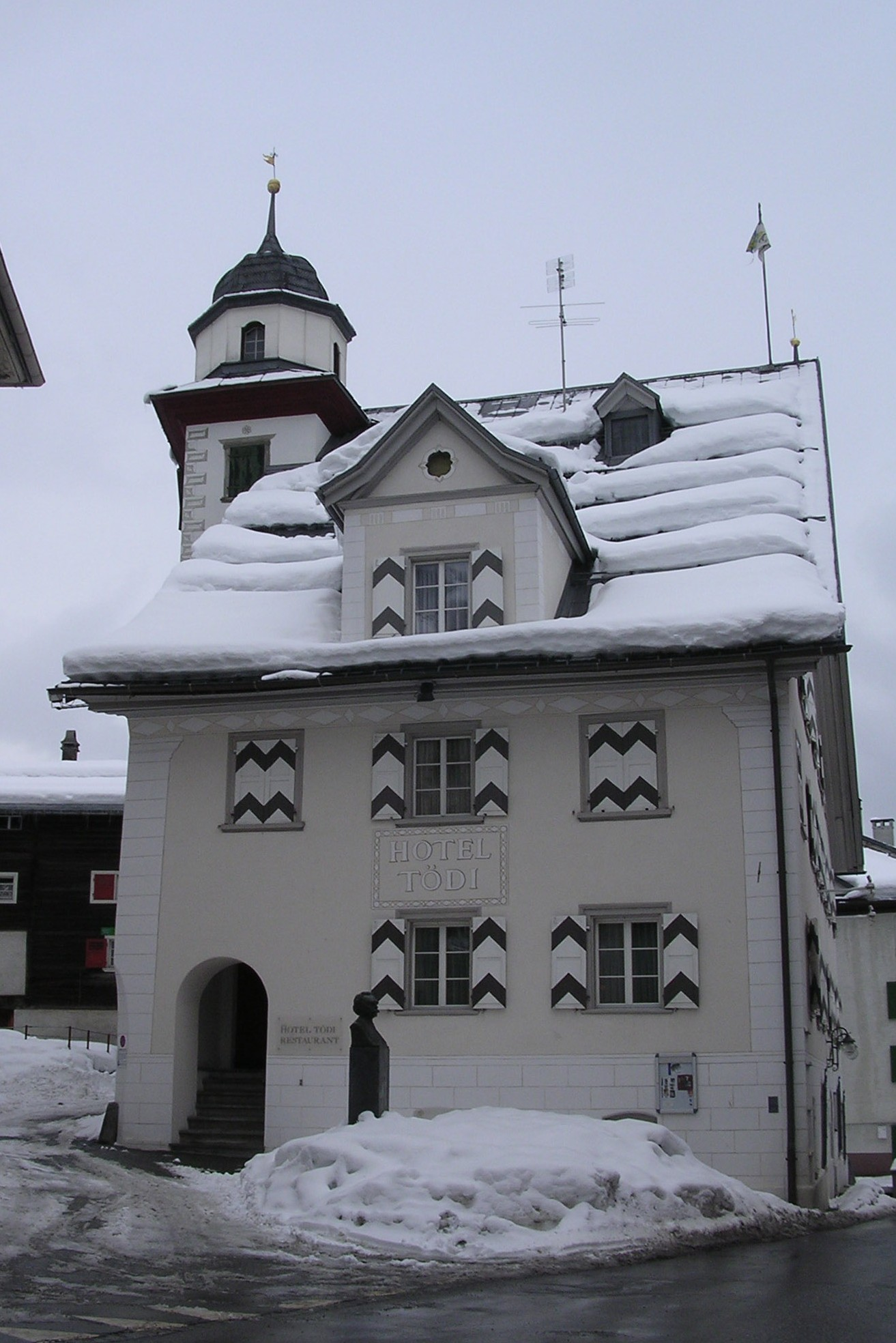
Hotel Tödi in the center of Trun

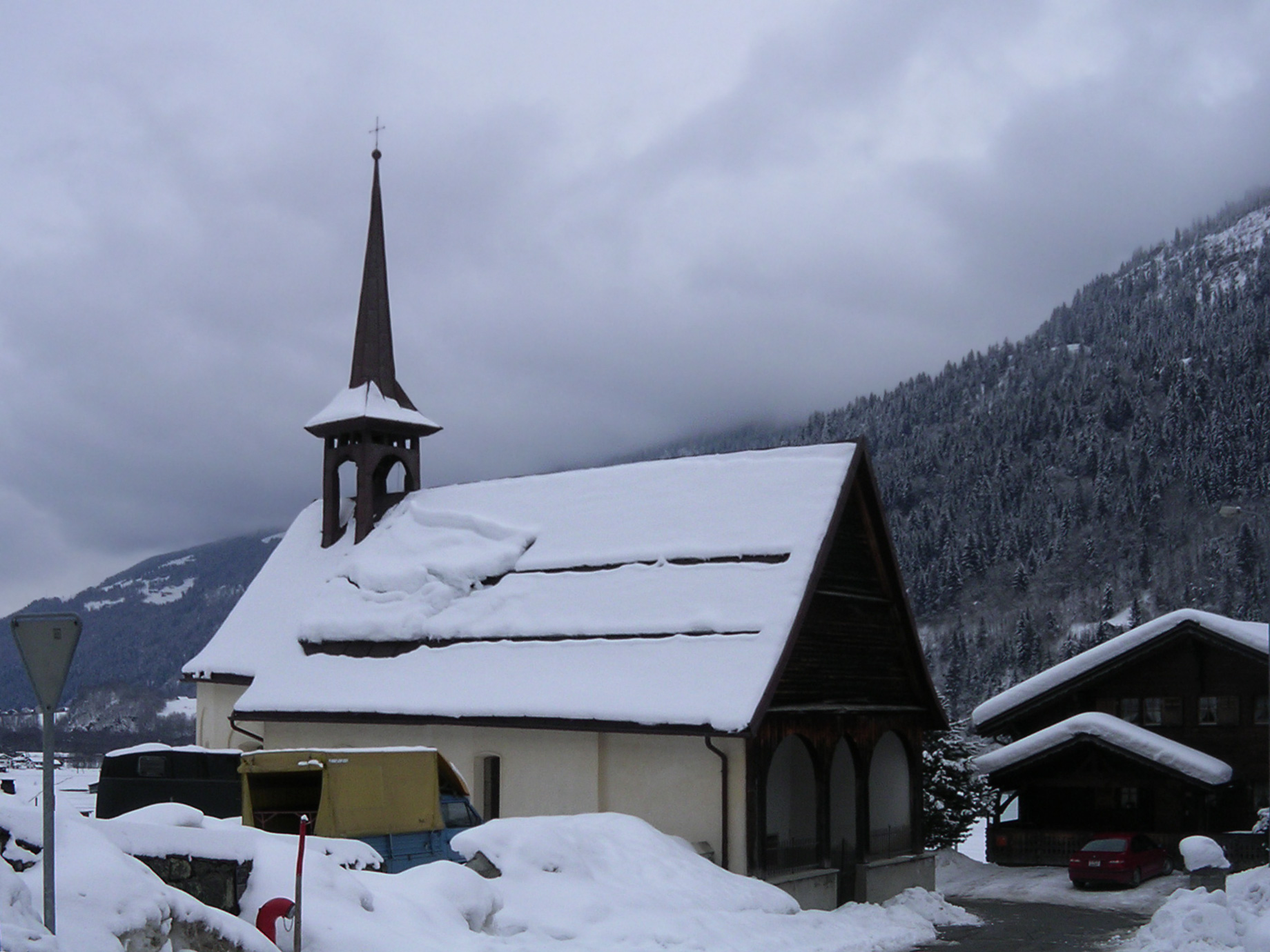
Church of Campliun

The historical population is given in the following table:

year	population
1850	1,047
1900	974
1950	1,598
1960	1,583
1970	1,607
1980	1,520
1990	1,357
2000	1,322

== Weather ==
Trun has an average of 121.2 days of rain per year and on average receives 1,050 mm (41 in) of precipitation. The wettest month is August during which time Trun receives an average of 110 mm (4.3 in) of precipitation. During this month there is precipitation for an average of 12.4 days. The driest month of the year is February with an average of 70 mm (2.8 in) of precipitation over 12.4 days.

== Heritage sites of national significance ==
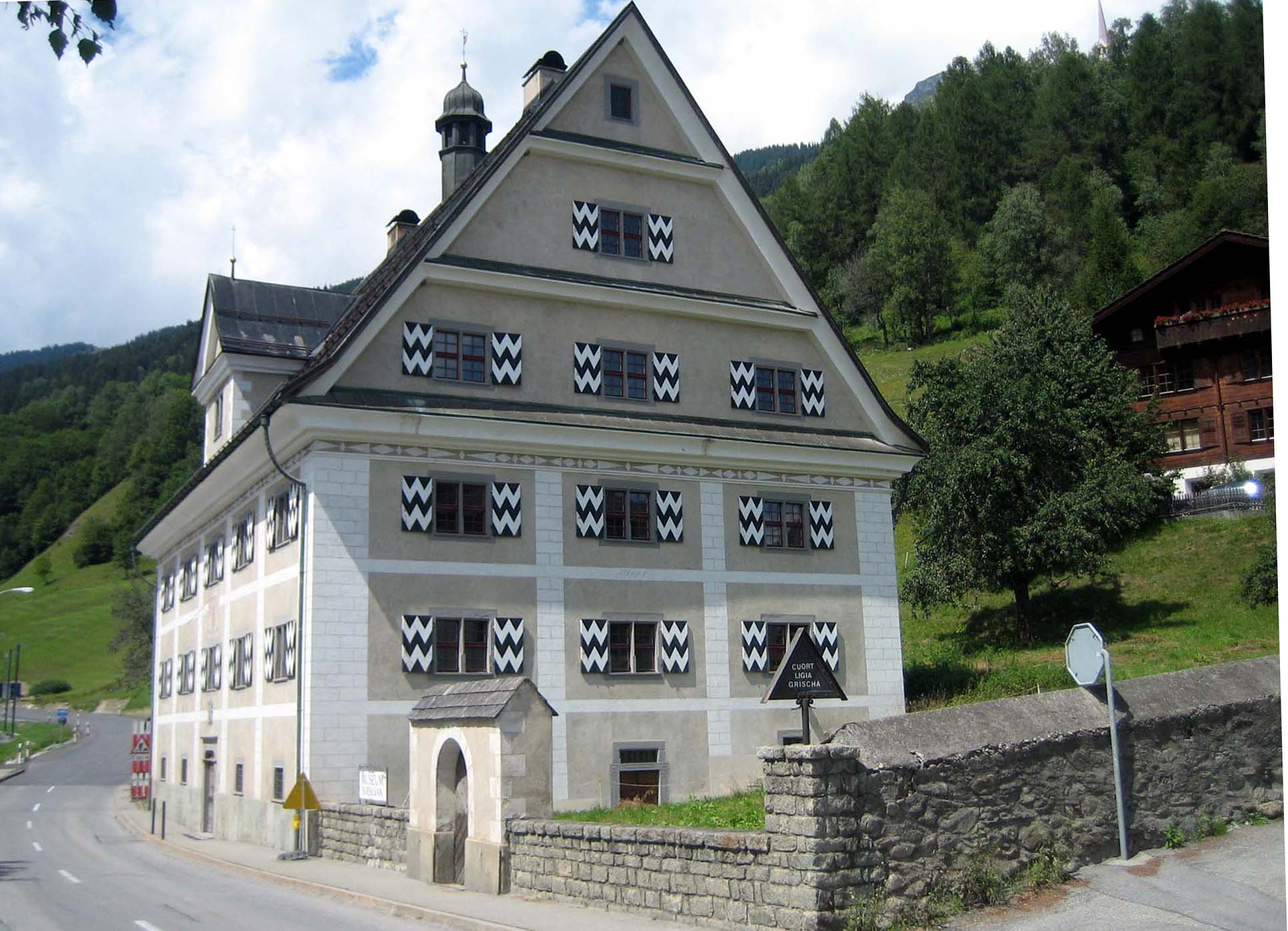
House Cuort

The Cuort Ligia Grischa house is listed as a Swiss heritage site of national significance. The villages of Trun and Schlans are part of the Inventory of Swiss Heritage Sites.

== Transportation ==
Trun railway station is located on the Reichenau-Tamins–Disentis/Mustér line of the Rhaetian Railway.
