= Valendas =

- Former municipality
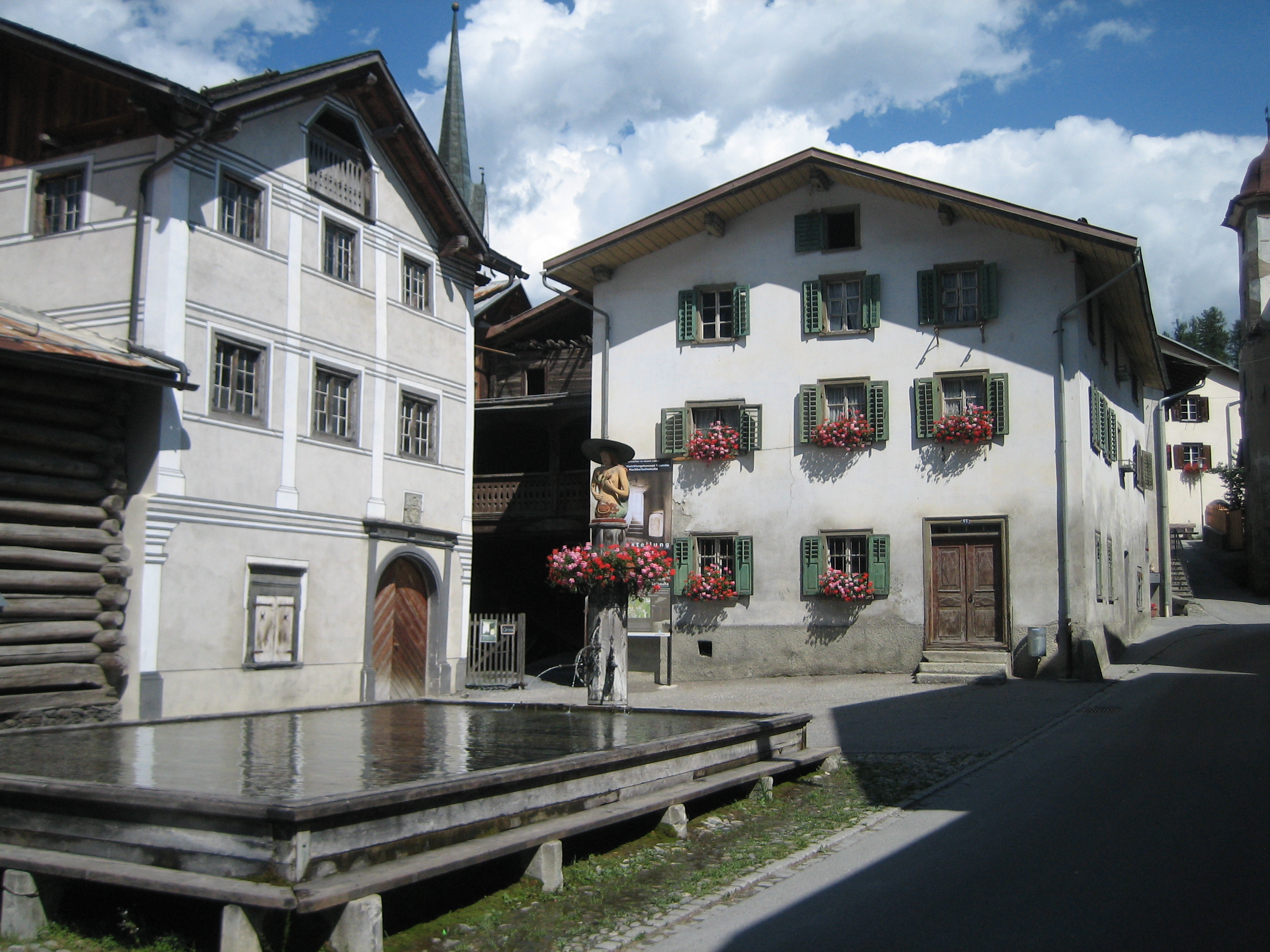

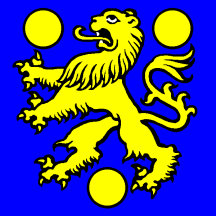
- Flag Coat of arms
- Location of Valendas
- Location within Switzerland Location within Canton of Graubünden
- Coordinates: 46°47′N 9°16′E
- Country: Switzerland
- Canton: Graubünden
- District: Surselva

Area
  - Total: 22.79 km^{2} (8.80 sq mi)
- Elevation: 810 m (2,660 ft)

Population (Dec 2011)
  - Total: 298
  - Density: 13.1/km^{2} (33.9/sq mi)
- Time zone: UTC+01:00 (CET)
  - Summer (DST): UTC+02:00 (CEST)
- Postal code: 7122
- SFOS number: 3586
- ISO 3166 code: CH-GR
- Surrounded by: Castrisch, Flims, Riein, Sagogn, Tenna, Versam
- Website: www.valendas.ch

Valendas is a former municipality in the district of Surselva in the canton of Graubünden in Switzerland. The municipalities of Valendas, Versam, Safien and Tenna merged on 1 January 2013 into the new municipality of Safiental.

== History ==
Valendas is first mentioned in 765 as in Valendano.

== Geography ==
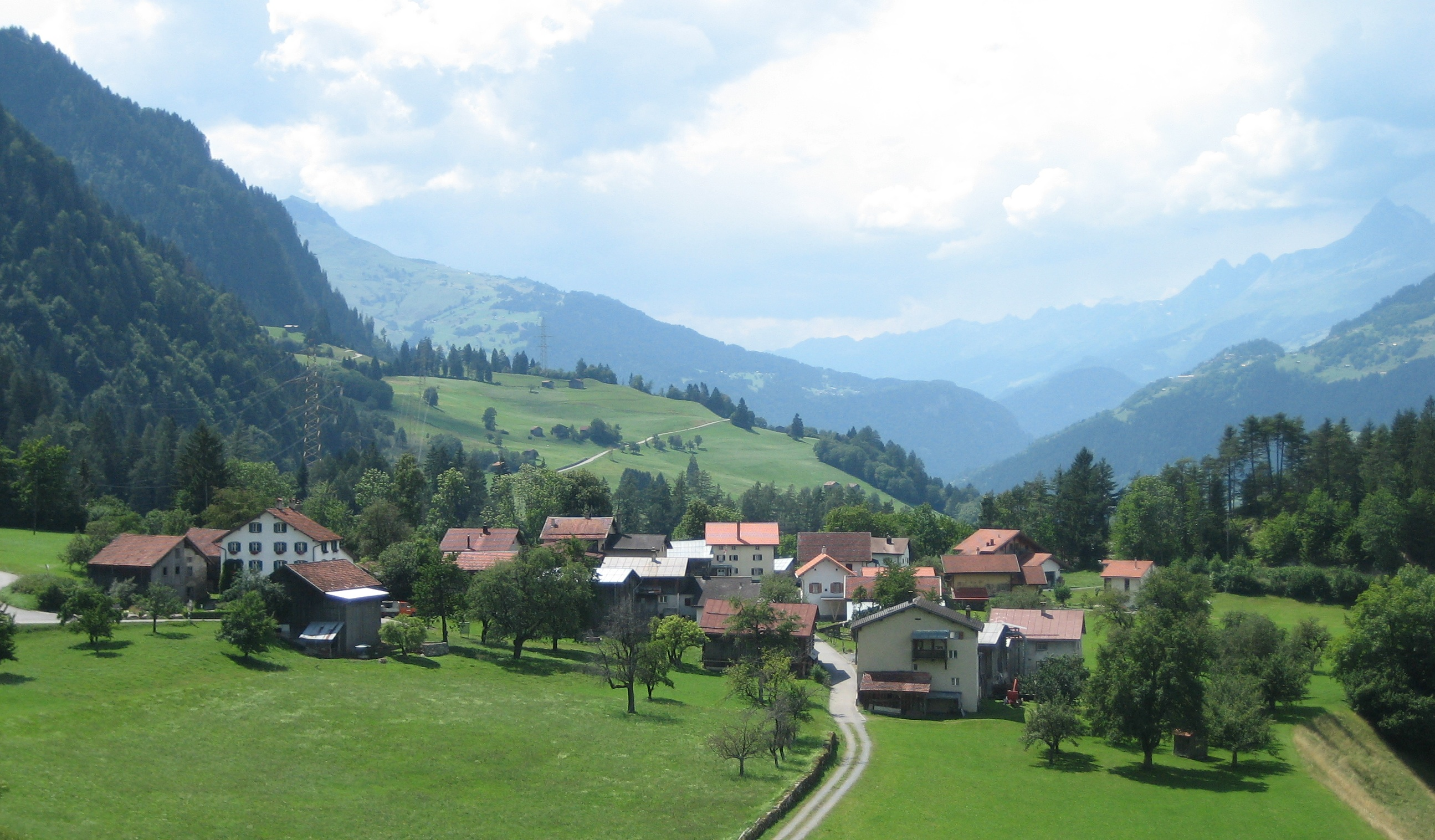
Carrera hamlet near Valendas

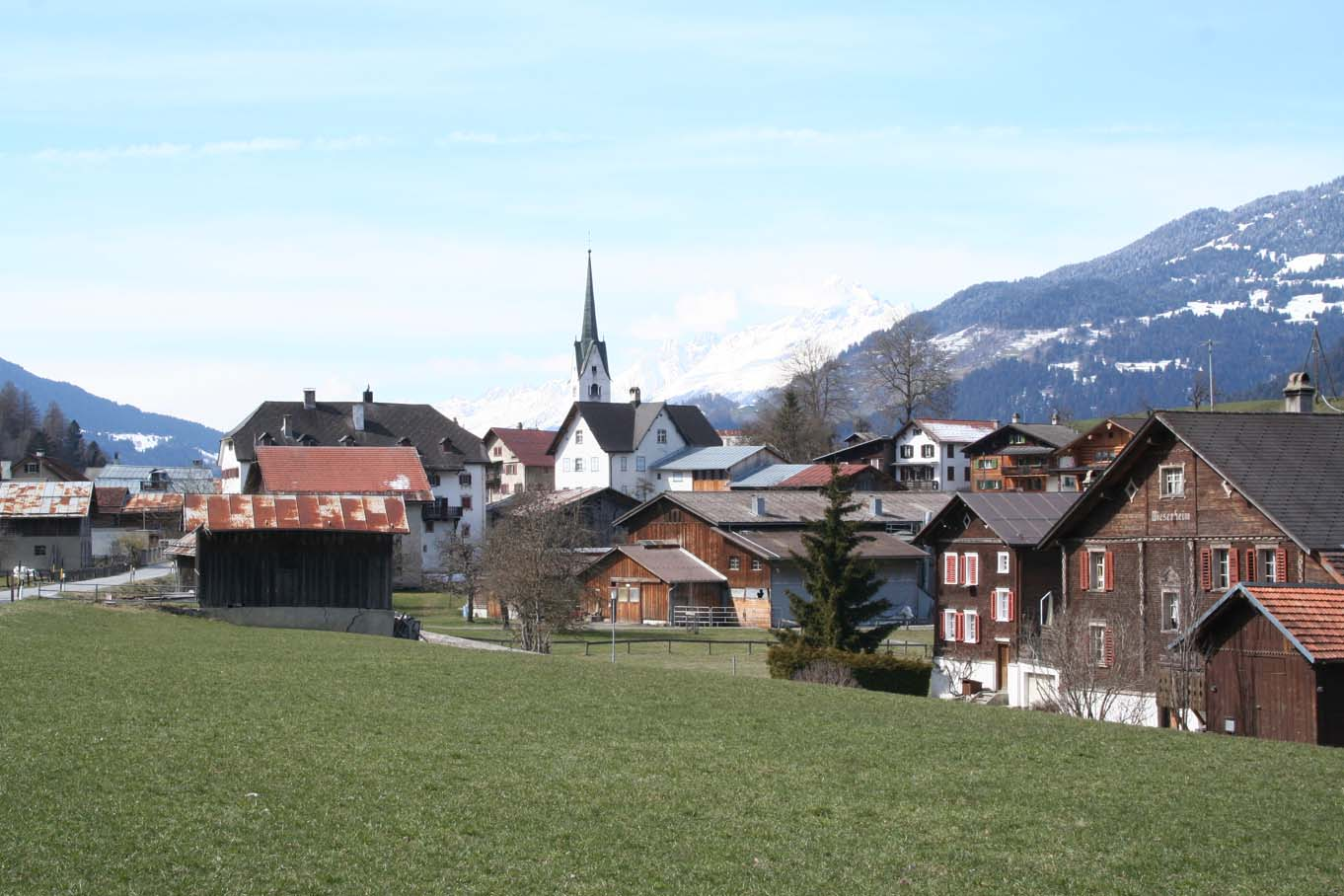
Valendas village

Aerial view (1947)

Valendas had an area, as of 2006, of 22.8 km^{2} (8.8 sq mi). Of this area, 21.6% is used for agricultural purposes, while 48.7% is forested. Of the rest of the land, 1.8% is settled (buildings or roads) and the remainder (27.9%) is non-productive (rivers, glaciers or mountains).

The former municipality is located in the Ilanz sub-district of the Surselva district. It is located above the right side of the Vorderrhein canyon. It consists of the haufendorf village (an irregular, unplanned and quite closely packed village, built around a central square) of Valendas and the hamlets of Carrera, Brün, Dutjen and Turisch.

== Demographics ==
Valendas had a population (as of 2011) of 298. As of 2008, 6.8% of the population was made up of foreign nationals. Over the last 10 years the population has decreased at a rate of -2.3%. Most of the population (as of 2000) speaks German (96.9%), with Romansh being second most common ( 1.7%) and Serbo-Croatian being third ( 1.0%).

As of 2000, the gender distribution of the population was 51.3% male and 48.7% female. The age distribution, as of 2000, in Valendas is; 40 children or 13.6% of the population are between 0 and 9 years old and 38 teenagers or 12.9% are between 10 and 19. Of the adult population, 23 people or 7.8% of the population are between 20 and 29 years old. 41 people or 13.9% are between 30 and 39, 43 people or 14.6% are between 40 and 49, and 40 people or 13.6% are between 50 and 59. The senior population distribution is 32 people or 10.9% of the population are between 60 and 69 years old, 18 people or 6.1% are between 70 and 79, there are 16 people or 5.4% who are between 80 and 89 there are 3 people or 1.0% who are between 90 and 99.

In the 2007 federal election the most popular party was the SVP which received 68.1% of the vote. The next three most popular parties were the FDP (13.3%), the SP (11%) and the CVP (5%).

In Valendas about 68.1% of the population (between age 25-64) have completed either non-mandatory upper secondary education or additional higher education (either university or a Fachhochschule).

Valendas has an unemployment rate of 0.11%. As of 2005, there were 66 people employed in the primary economic sector and about 25 businesses involved in this sector. 21 people are employed in the secondary sector and there are 4 businesses in this sector. 29 people are employed in the tertiary sector, with 10 businesses in this sector.

The historical population is given in the following table:

year	population
1803	463
1850	555
1900	499
1950	441
2000	294

== Heritage sites of national significance ==
The Türelihus and the Haus Joos and attached barn are listed as Swiss heritage sites of national significance.

The Türelihus (Türeli House) is located in the center of Valendas and is one of the most historically valuable houses in the village. The interior contains many of the original furnishings from the Renaissance and Baroque eras. The original building was constructed in 1485. In 1554 it was expanded, this expansion was known as the Renaissance phase, with a spiral staircase within a tower and a stable was added to the north side. In 1775 it was renovated in the baroque style. The four-story building was abandoned for many years and had begun to decay. In 1994, the first attempt to renovate this building ended with only the addition of a temporary roof.

The oldest part of the Haus Joos may date to about 1300. The attached barn has a date of 1572 carved into it. However, the building is currently in poor condition and has not been used for a number of years.

== Transport ==
Valendas-Sagogn station, on the line of the Rhaetian Railway that links Chur and Disentis, lies some 120 metres (390 ft) below and 1.2 kilometres (0.75 mi) distant from the village of Valendas.
