= Sagogn =

- Municipality
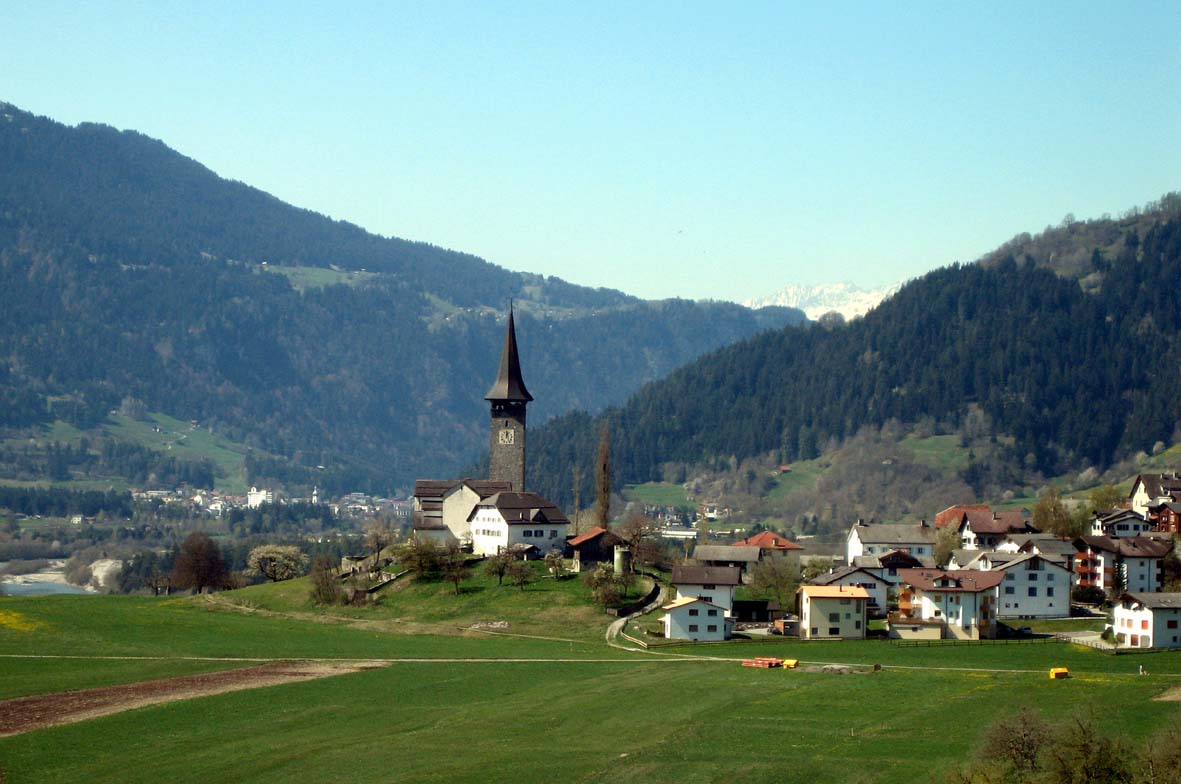

- Flag Coat of arms
- Location of Sagogn
- Location within Switzerland Location within Canton of Grisons
- Coordinates: 46°47′N 9°15′E
- Country: Switzerland
- Canton: Grisons
- District: Surselva

Area
  - Total: 6.95 km^{2} (2.68 sq mi)
- Elevation: 779 m (2,556 ft)

Population (December 2020)
  - Total: 736
  - Density: 106/km^{2} (274/sq mi)
- Time zone: UTC+01:00 (CET)
  - Summer (DST): UTC+02:00 (CEST)
- Postal code: 7152
- SFOS number: 3581
- ISO 3166 code: CH-GR
- Surrounded by: Castrisch, Falera, Flims, Laax, Schluein, Valendas, Versam
- Website: www.sagogn.ch

Sagogn (Romansh pronunciation: [sɐˈɡɔɲ]; German: Sagens) is a municipality in the Surselva Region in the canton of the Grisons in Switzerland.

== History ==
Sagogn is first mentioned in 765 as Secanio.

== Geography ==
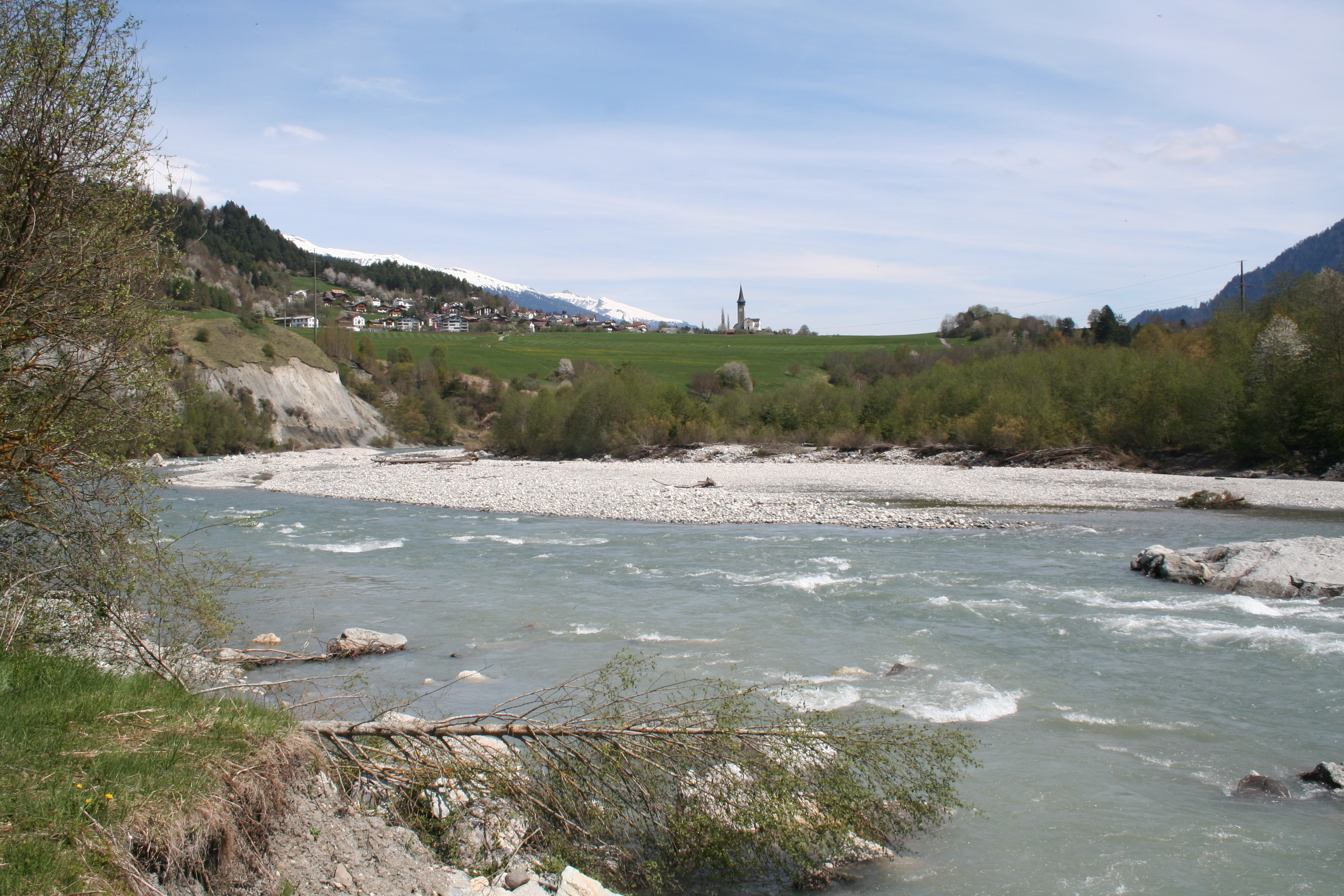
Vorderrhein river, with Sagogn in the background

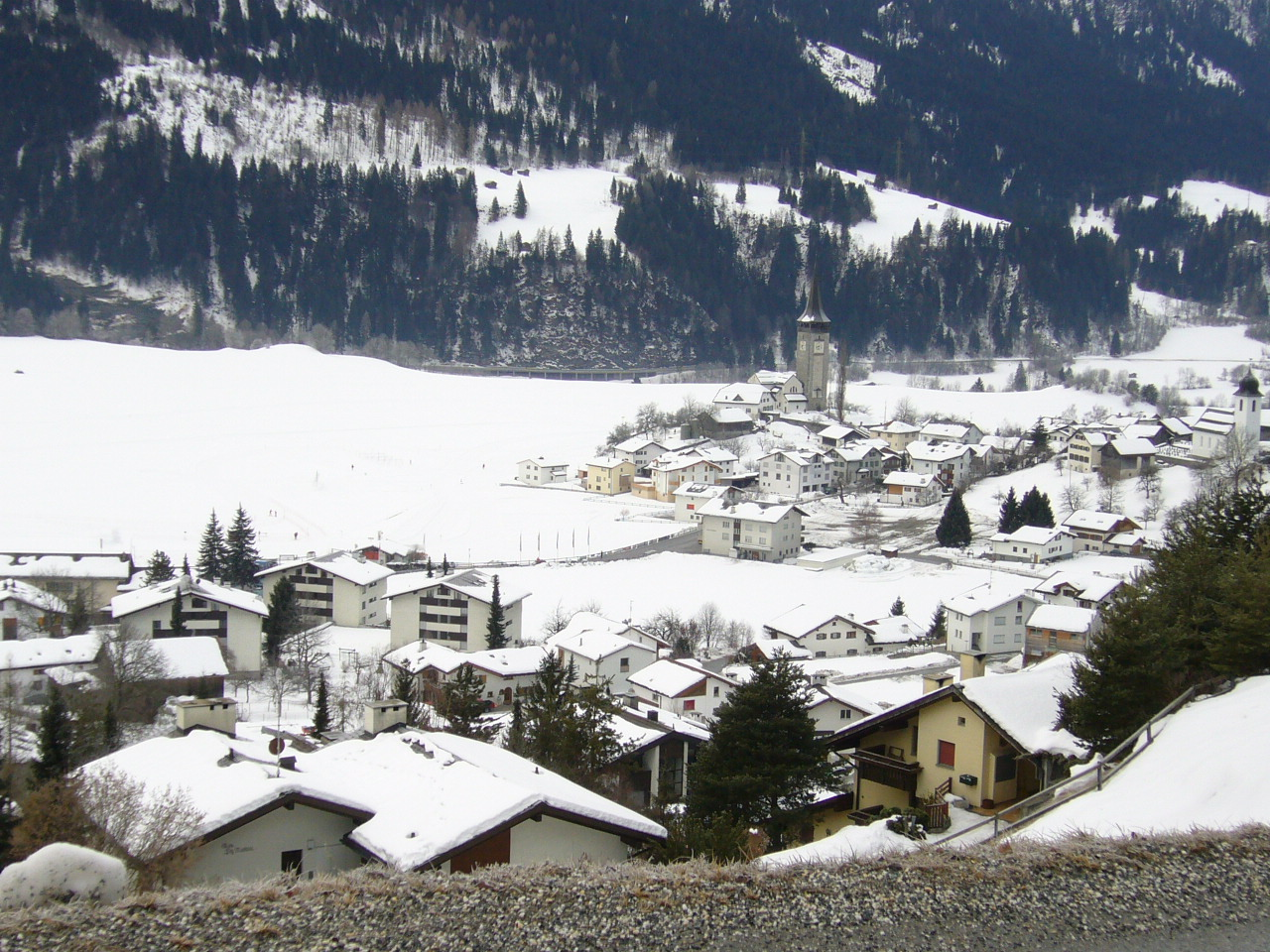
Sagogn in winter

Aerial view (1957)

Sagogn has an area, as of 2006, of 7 km^{2} (2.7 sq mi). Of this area, 23.2% is used for agricultural purposes, while 59.7% is forested. Of the rest of the land, 4.7% is settled (buildings or roads) and the remainder (12.4%) is non-productive (rivers, glaciers or mountains).

Before 2017, the municipality was located in the Ilanz sub-district of the Surselva district, after 2017 it was part of the Surselva Region. It is on the northern slope above the Vorderrhein on the bank of the Gruob (or Foppa). It consists of the village sections of Innerdorf (Vitg Dadens) and Ausserdorf (Vitg Dado). Until 1943 Sagogn was known by its German name as Sagens.

== Demographics ==
Sagogn has a population (as of 31 December 2020) of 736. As of 2008, 6.6% of the population was made up of foreign nationals. Over the last 10 years the population has decreased at a rate of -5.4%. Most of the population (as of 2000) speaks Romansh (57.1%), with German being second most common (41.4%) and Dutch being third ( 0.3%). The official language is the Sursilvan dialect of Romansh.

As of 2000, the gender distribution of the population was 55.0% male and 45.0% female. The age distribution, as of 2000, in Sagogn is; 60 children or 10.1% of the population are between 0 and 9 years old and 93 teenagers or 15.6% are between 10 and 19. Of the adult population, 63 people or 10.6% of the population are between 20 and 29 years old. 92 people or 15.4% are between 30 and 39, 95 people or 15.9% are between 40 and 49, and 79 people or 13.2% are between 50 and 59. The senior population distribution is 60 people or 10.1% of the population are between 60 and 69 years old, 26 people or 4.4% are between 70 and 79, there are 23 people or 3.9% who are between 80 and 89 there are 6 people or 1.0% who are between 90 and 99.

In the 2007 federal election the most popular party was the SVP which received 32.6% of the vote. The next three most popular parties were the CVP (29.8%), the SP (23.4%) and the FDP (12.2%).

In Sagogn about 74.9% of the population (between age 25 and 64) have completed either non-mandatory upper secondary education or additional higher education (either university or a Fachhochschule).

Sagogn has an unemployment rate of 0.98%. As of 2005, there were 13 people employed in the primary economic sector and about 5 businesses involved in this sector. 22 people are employed in the secondary sector and there are 8 businesses in this sector. 33 people are employed in the tertiary sector, with 11 businesses in this sector.

The historical population is given in the following table:

year	population
1803	399
1850	535
1900	405
1950	492
1970	383
1990	611
2000	597

== Heritage sites of national significance ==
The Church of S. Maria, and the prehistoric settlement, medieval castle and church at Schiedberg Castle/Bregl da Haida are listed as Swiss heritage sites of national significance.

The Church of S. Maria was built in 1634, while the church tower is from an earlier structure and was built in 1449. The church has a three-bay nave with a rectangular choir and transept and two side chapels. The ceiling and wall murals were painted in 1639 by Giov. Batt. Macholino. The high and side altars date from about the same time. The castle site at Scheidberg has been occupied since the prehistoric era. The castle served to protect the Lukmanier Pass trade route. The church at nearby Bregl da Haida was built in the 5th century and replaced with a Carolingian church in the 7th century. The church had a single nave and a horseshoe shaped apse. It was mentioned in the Testament of Bischof Tello in 765 as the Columbans church. This church may have been a private chapel for the raetian Viktoriden family, who lived in a nearby manor house.

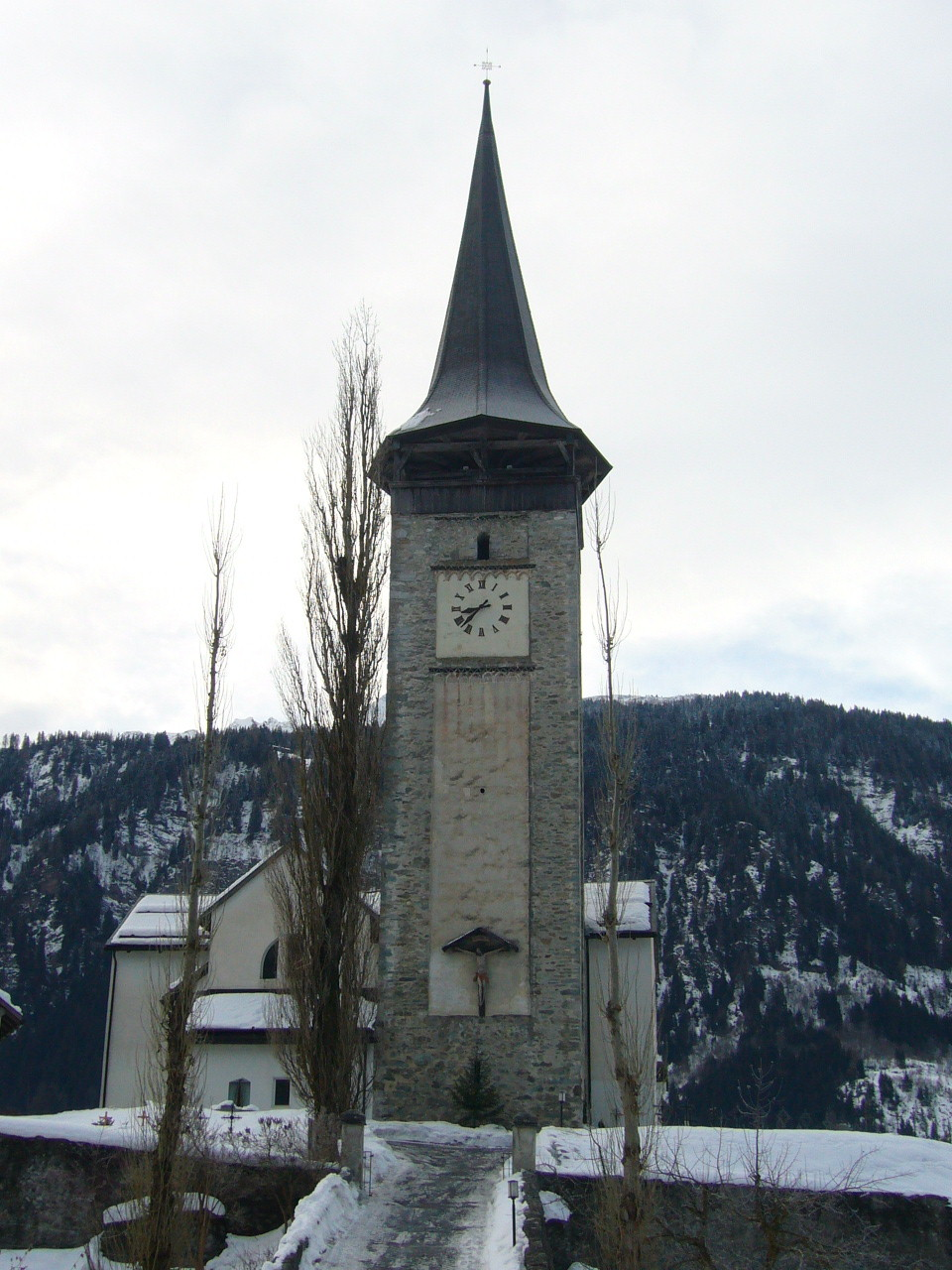
Church of S. Maria

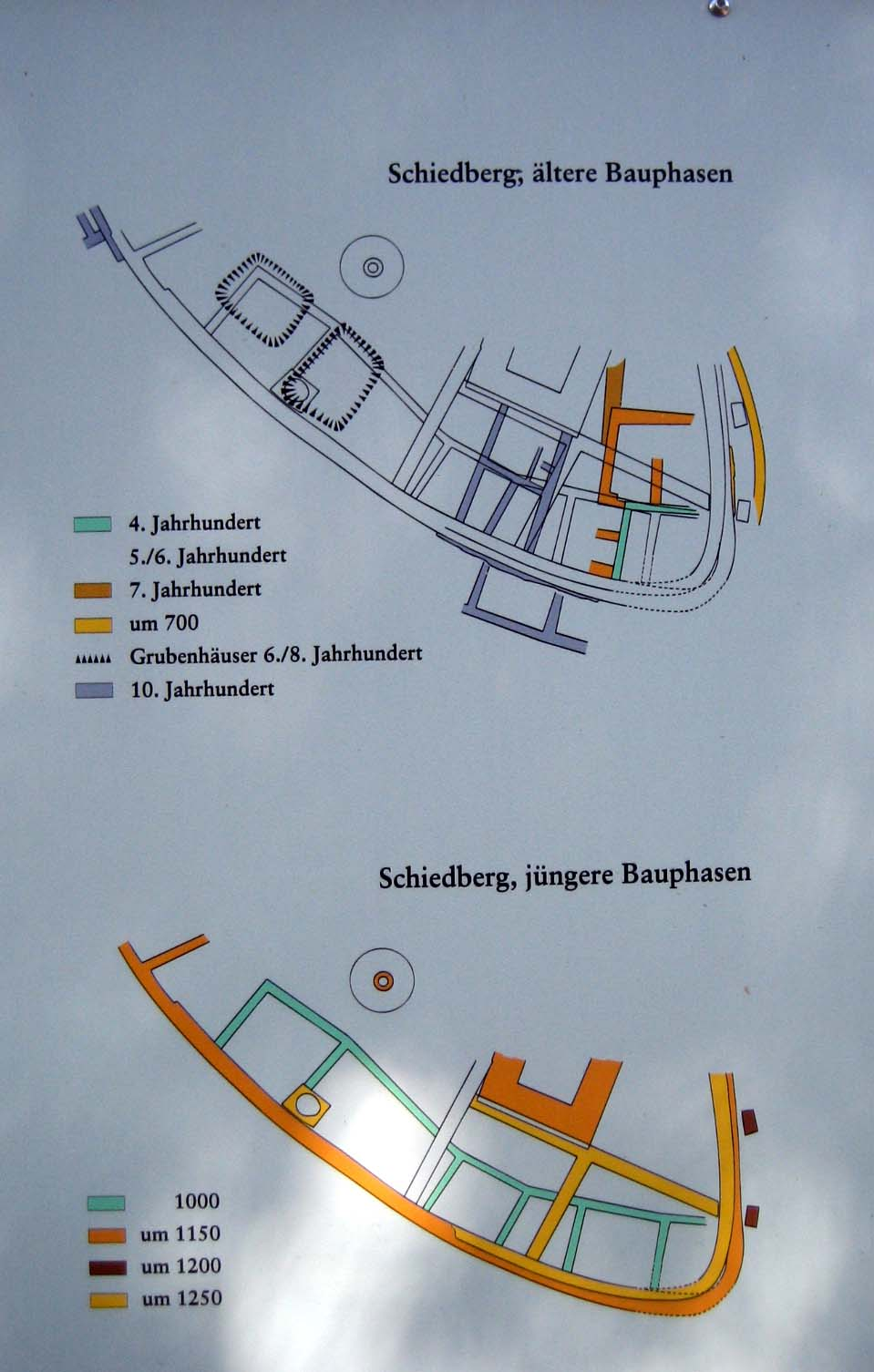
Floorplan of the ruins of Burg Schiedberg

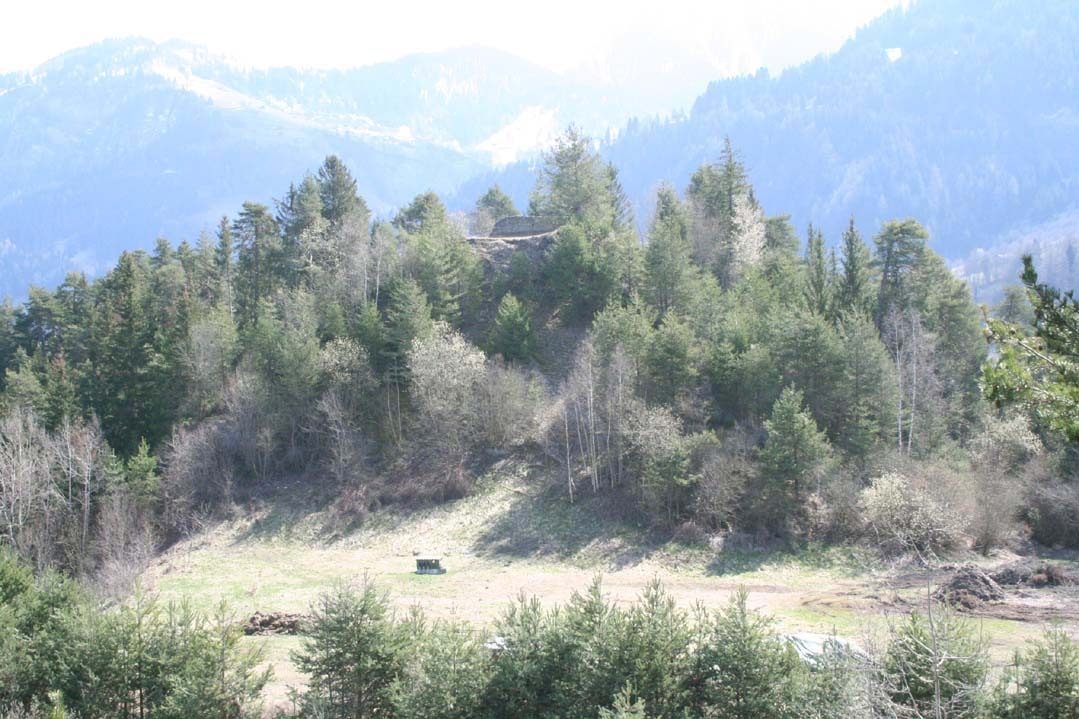
Burg Schiedberg hill

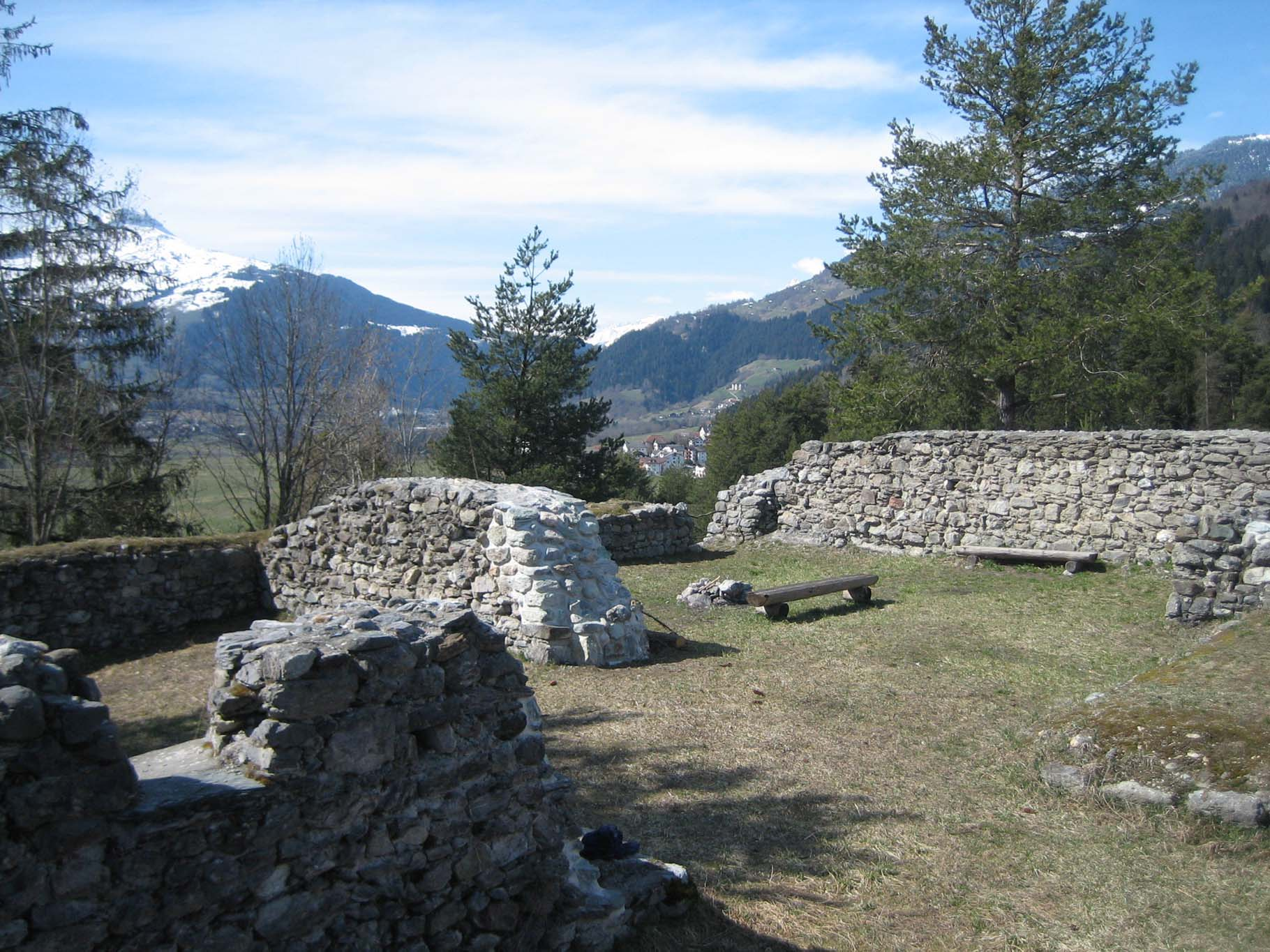
Castle Schiedberg ruins, looking north

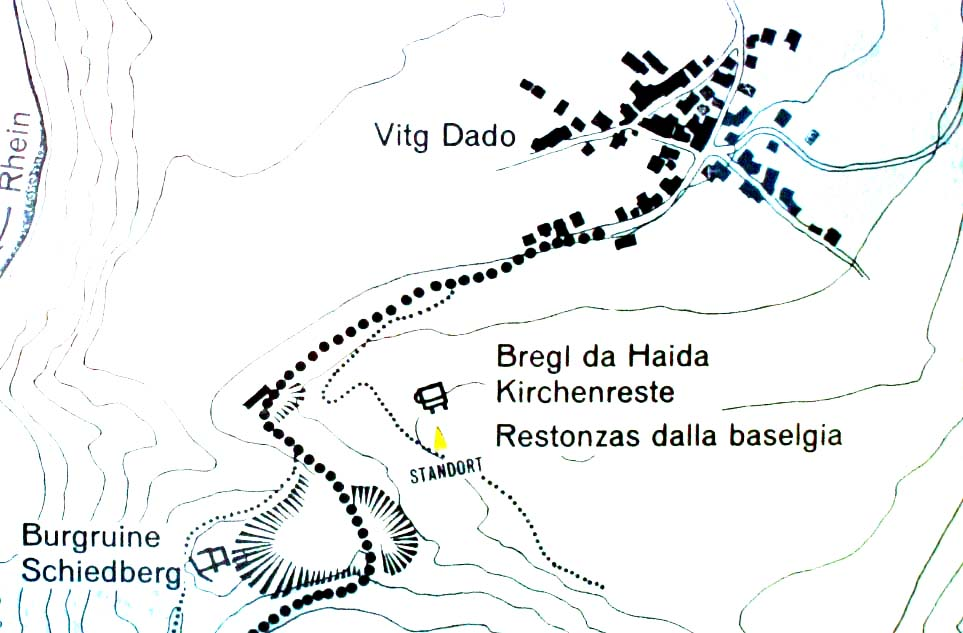
Location of Bregl da Haida

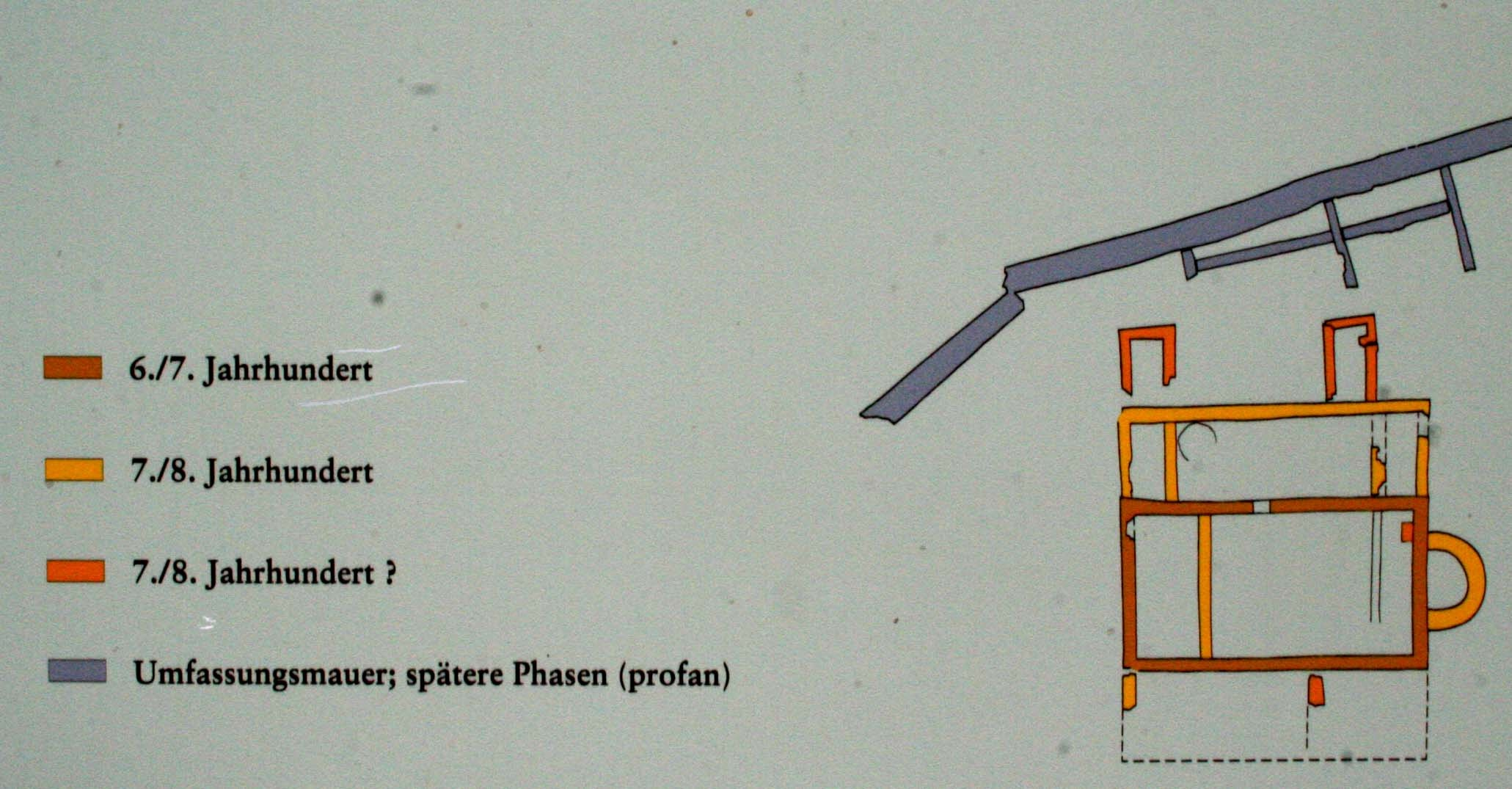
Bregl da Haida floorplan and growth

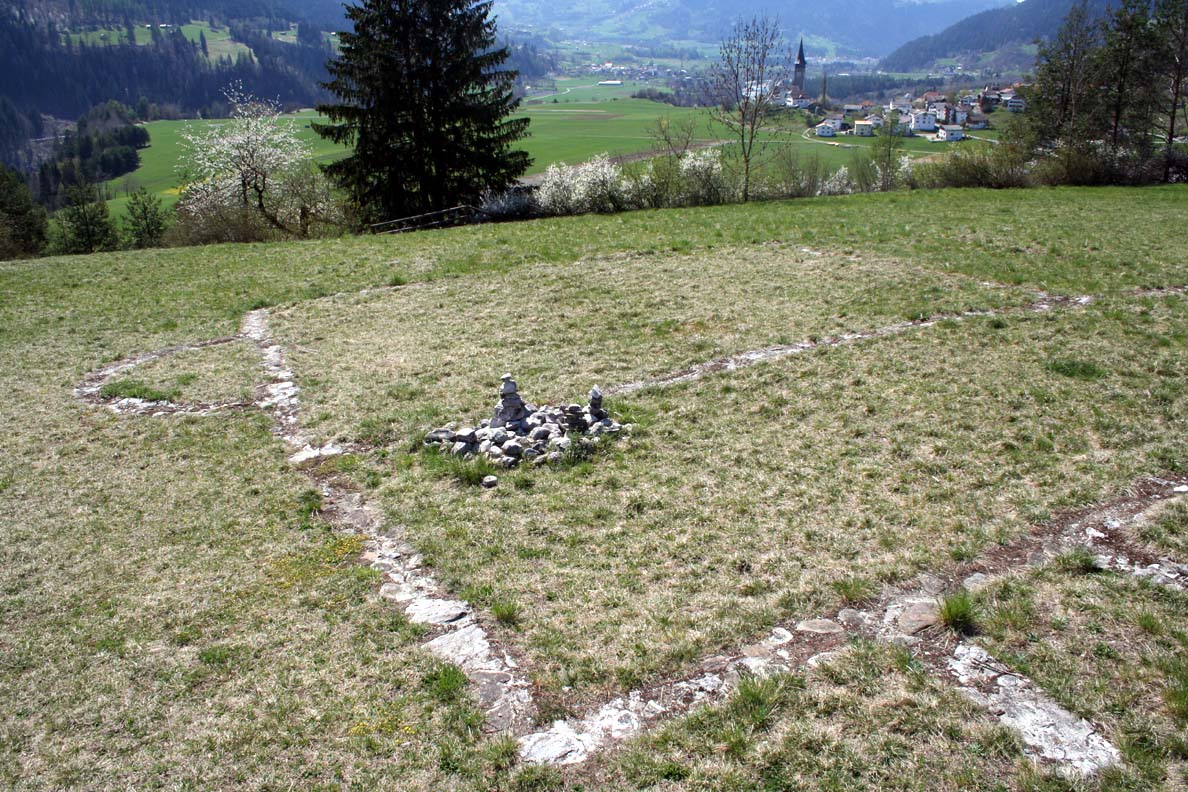
Bregl da Haida foundations

== Transport ==
Valendas-Sagogn station, on the line of the Rhaetian Railway that links Chur and Disentis, lies some 120 metres (390 ft) below and 2.3 kilometres (1.4 mi) distant from the village of Sagogn.
