= Versam =

- Former municipality
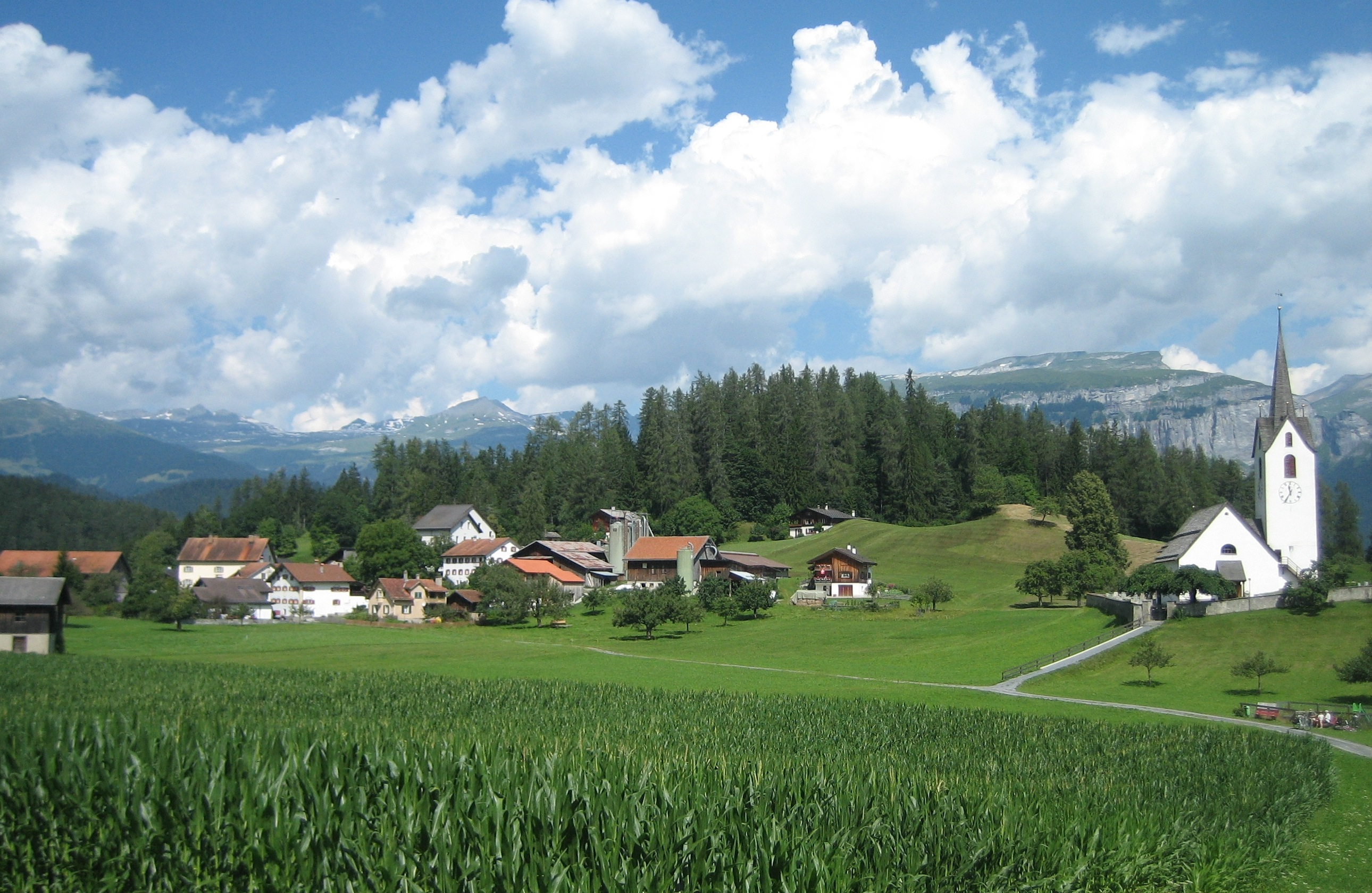
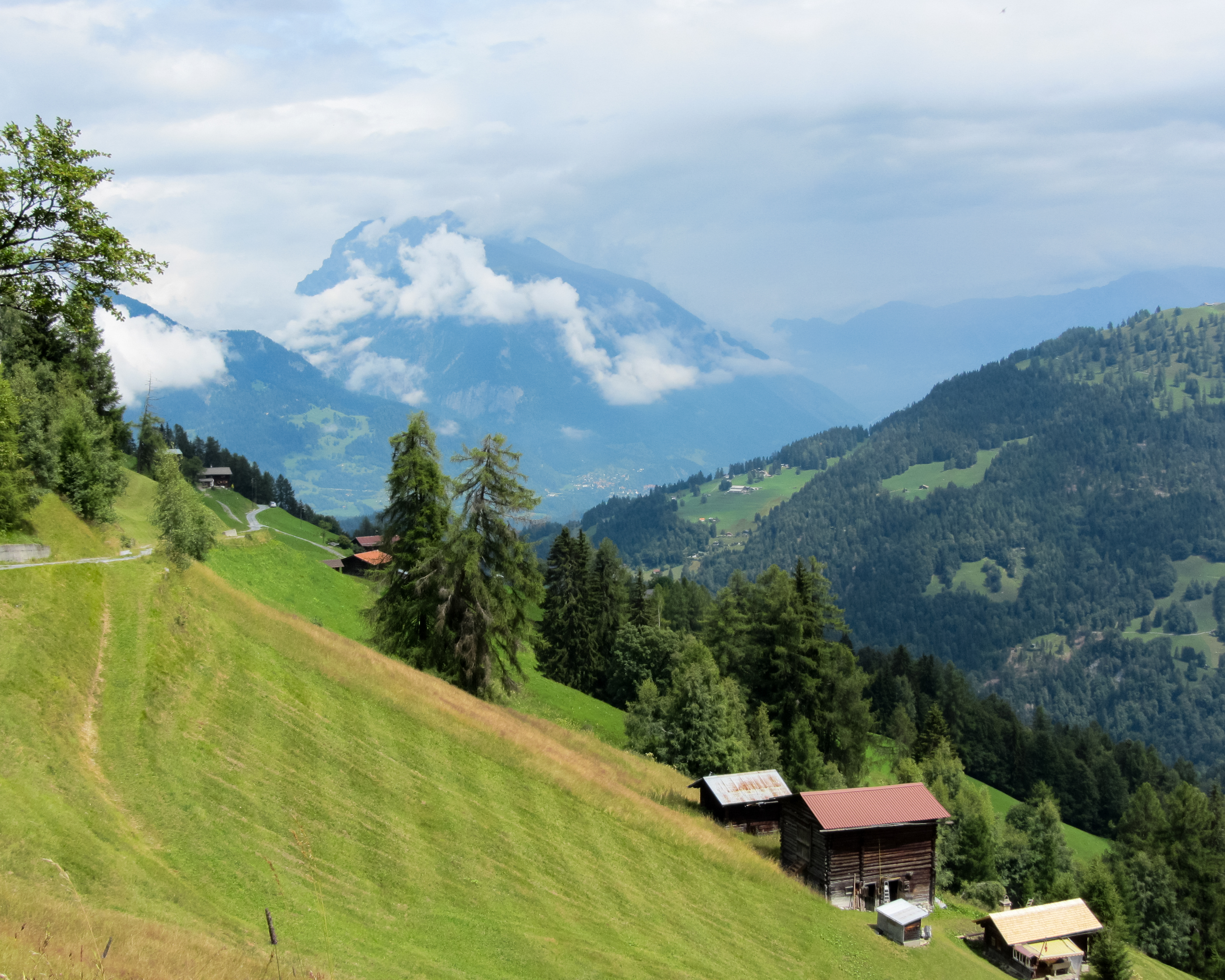
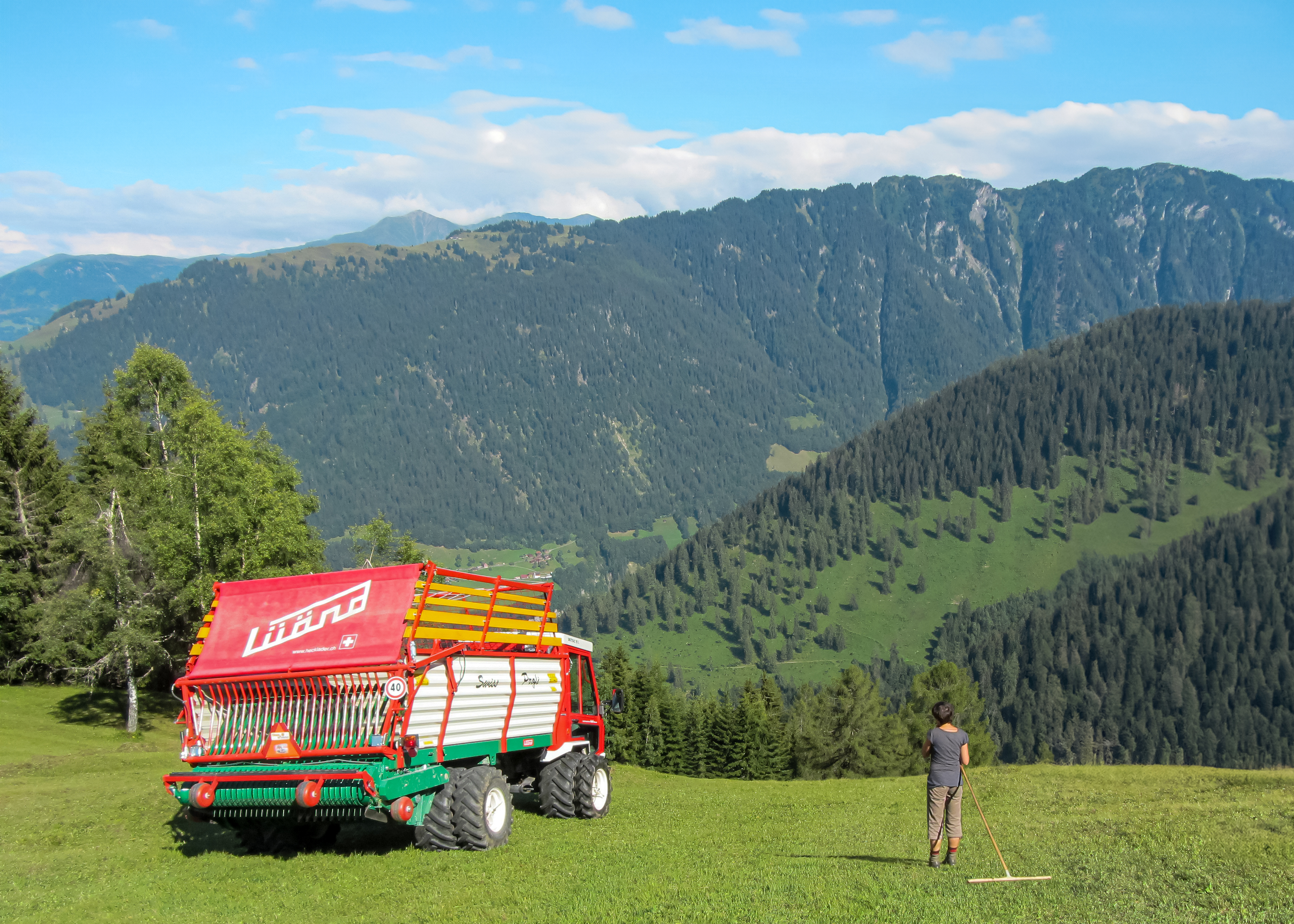

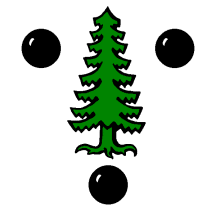
- Flag Coat of arms
- Location of Versam
- Location within Switzerland Location within Canton of Graubünden
- Coordinates: 46°47′N 9°20′E
- Country: Switzerland
- Canton: Graubünden
- District: Surselva

Area
  - Total: 16.77 km^{2} (6.47 sq mi)
- Elevation: 909 m (2,982 ft)

Population (Dec 2011)
  - Total: 226
  - Density: 13.5/km^{2} (34.9/sq mi)
- Time zone: UTC+01:00 (CET)
  - Summer (DST): UTC+02:00 (CEST)
- Postal code: 7104
- SFOS number: 3587
- ISO 3166 code: CH-GR
- Surrounded by: Bonaduz, Flims, Präz, Rhäzüns, Safien, Sagogn, Tenna, Trin, Valendas
- Website: www.versam.ch

Versam is a former municipality in the district of Surselva in the canton of Graubünden in Switzerland. The municipalities of Valendas, Versam, Safien and Tenna merged on 1 January 2013 into the new municipality of Safiental.

== History ==
Versam is first mentioned in 1050 as a valle Versamia.

== Geography ==
Versam had an area, as of 2006, of 16.8 km^{2} (6.5 sq mi). Of this area, 16.8% is used for agricultural purposes, while 70.6% is forested. Of the rest of the land, 2% is settled (buildings or roads) and the remainder (10.6%) is non-productive (rivers, glaciers or mountains).

The former municipality is located in the Ilanz sub-district of the Surselva district. It is located above the Vorderrhein canyon at the entrance to the Safien Valley. It consists of the linear village of Versam and the hamlets of Versam-Station, Arezen, Calörtsch and Sculms.

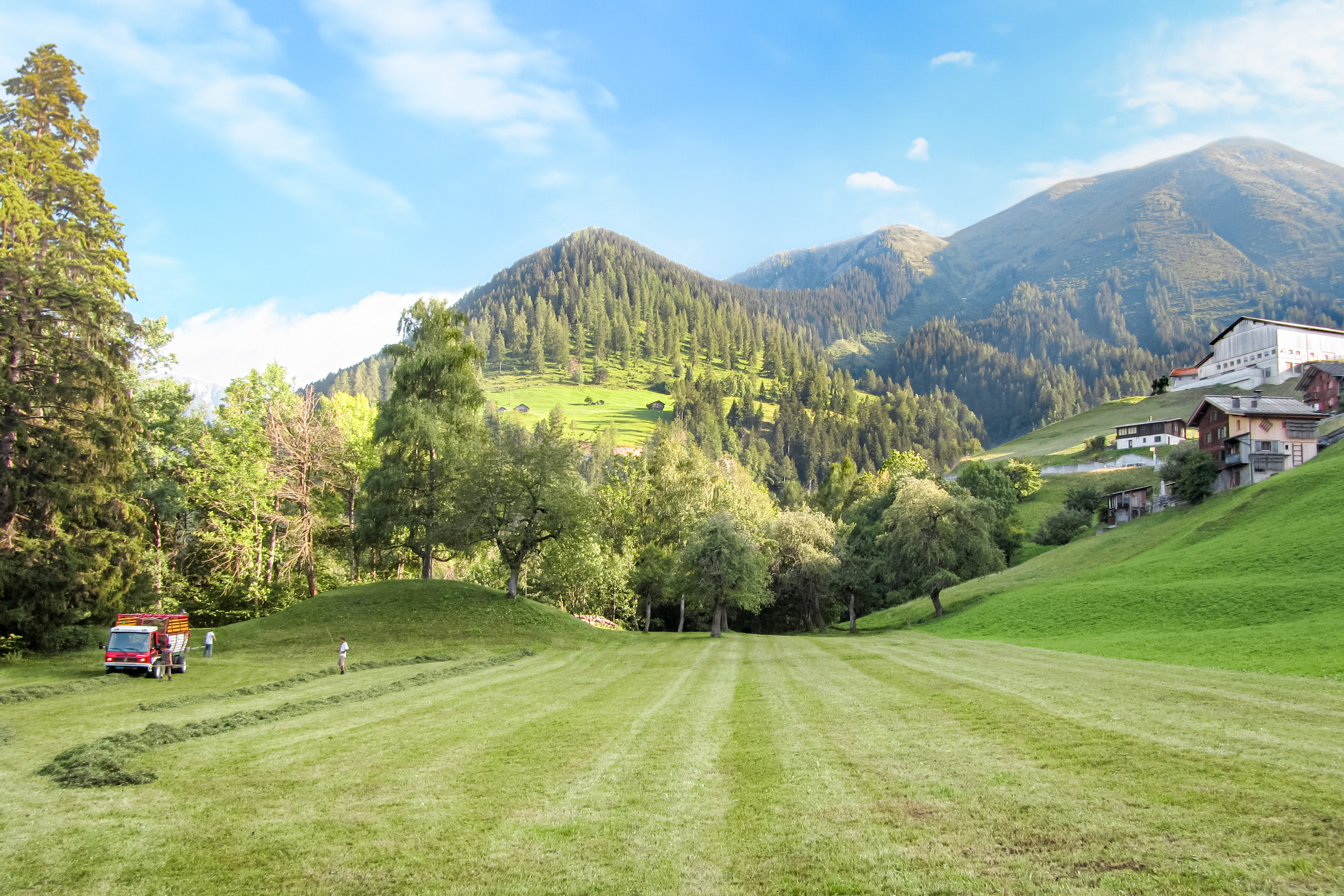
Hay field in Versam

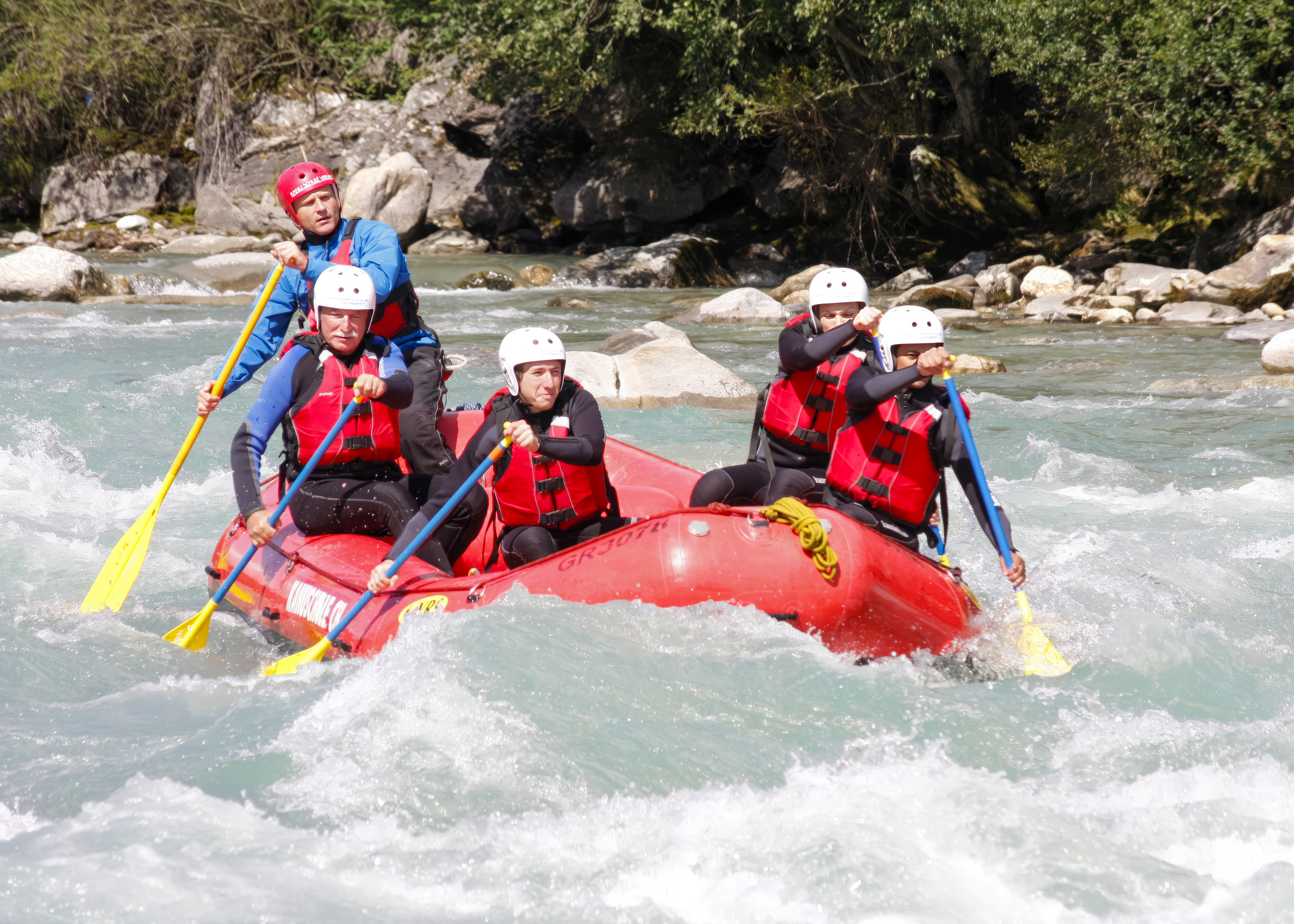
Rafting from Ilanz to Versam

== Demographics ==
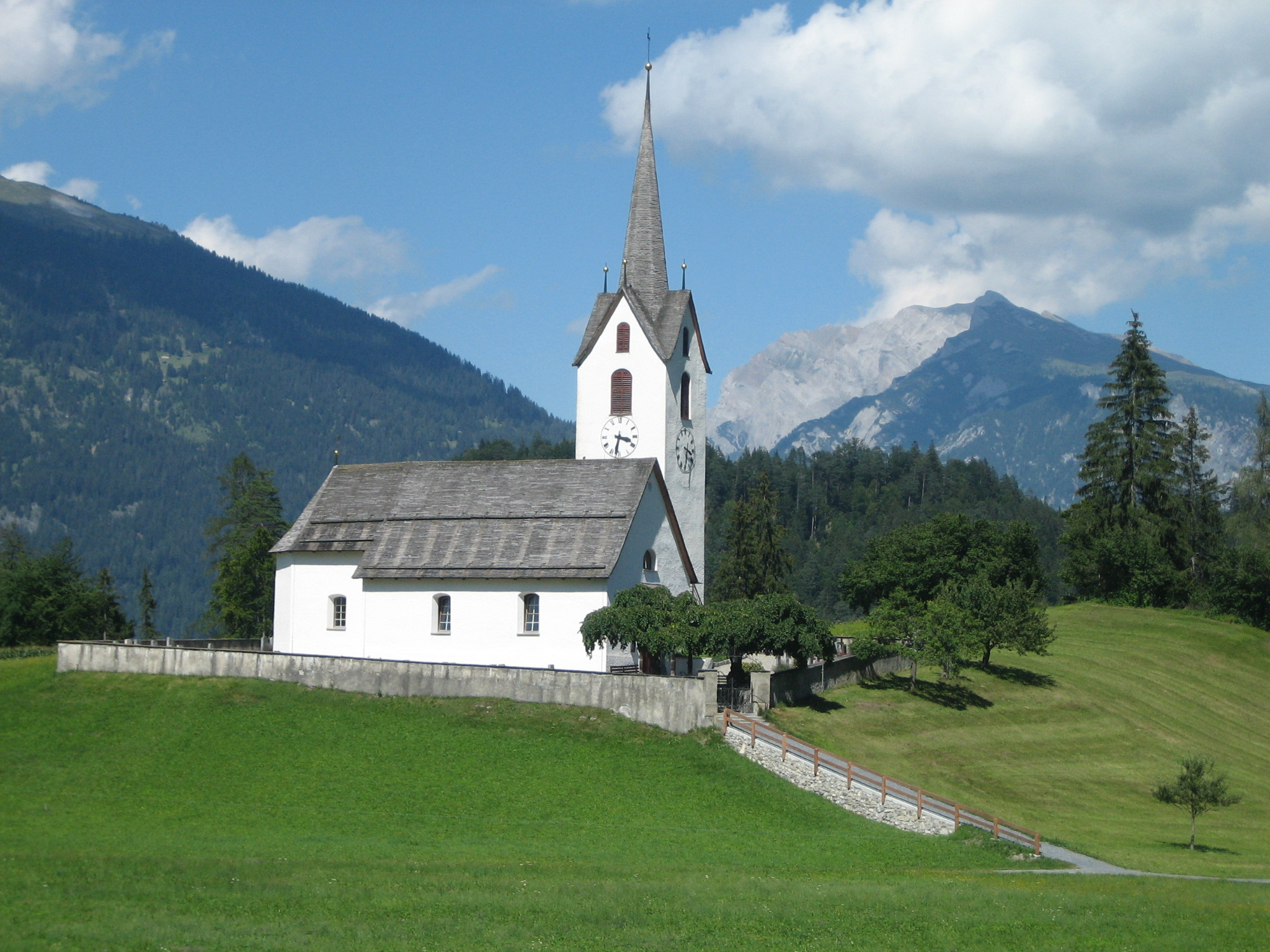
Versam village church

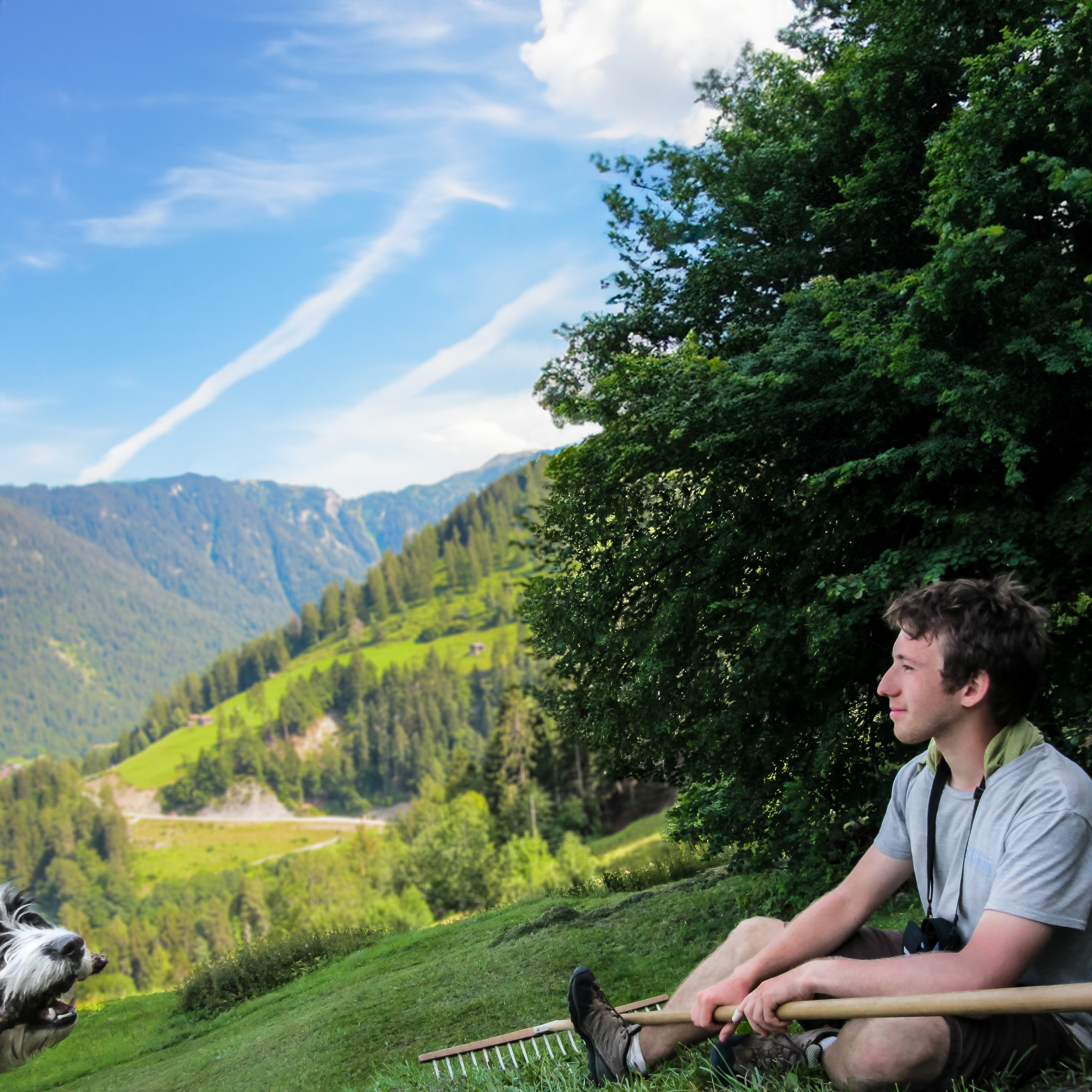
Hay farmer in Versam

As of 2011, Versam had a population of 226. The historical population is as follows:

year	population
2000	255
1950	354
1900	316
1850	396
1803	357

As of 2008, 4.0% of the population was made up of foreign nationals.

As of 2000:

- most of the population speaks Swiss German (98.0%), with Romansh being second most common ( 1.6%) and Spanish being third ( 0.4%).
- the gender distribution was 48.6% male and 51.4% female.
- the age distribution was as follows:

Age group	Population	% of total
Children (0-9yrs)	35	13.7%
Teenagers (10-19yrs)	33	12.9%
Adults (20-29yrs)	12	4.7%
Adults (30-39yrs)	41	16.1%
Adults (40-49yrs)	36	14.1%
Adults (50-59yrs)	25	9.8%
Seniors (60-69yrs)	29	11.4%
Seniors (70-79yrs)	25	9.8%
Seniors (80-89yrs)	15	5.9%
Seniors (90-99yrs)	4	1.6%

=== Education ===
In Versam about 78.9% of the population (between age 25–64) have completed either non-mandatory upper secondary education or additional higher education (either university or a Fachhochschule). The nearest fachhochschules to Versam are in Chur, such as the Chur University of Applied Sciences and Fachhochschule Graubünden.

=== Politics ===
In the 2007 federal election the most popular party was the SVP which received 42.6% of the vote. The next three most popular parties were the SP (30.7%), the FDP (16.7%) and the CVP (9.1%).

== Economy ==
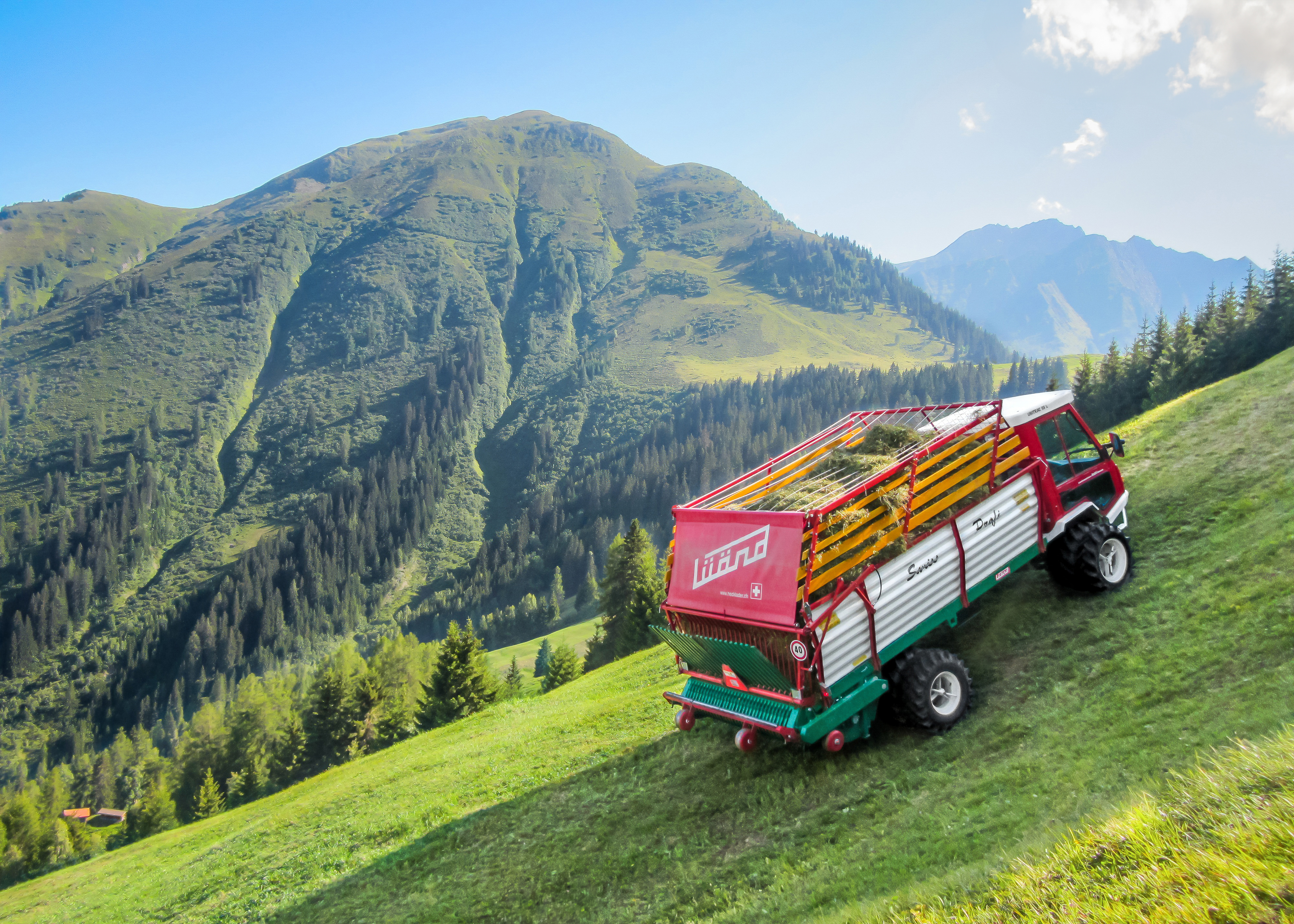
Hay truck in Versam

As of 2005, Versam has an unemployment rate of 0.52%. Employment and businesses were organized as follows:

Sector	People Employed	Businesses Involved
Primary (raw materials)	41	17
Secondary (manufacturing)	7	3
Tertiary (service)	52	9

== Transportation ==
Versam-Safien station, on the line of the Rhaetian Railway that links Chur and Disentis, is located and some 250 metres (820 ft) lower than the village of Versam, and about 3.6 km (2.2 mi) to the north. To solve this, a PostAuto bus service provides a direct connection between the railway station and the village, as well as to Thalkirch and Tenna.

Versam was connected to Tenna in 1994 with the completion of the Aclatobel Tunnel.

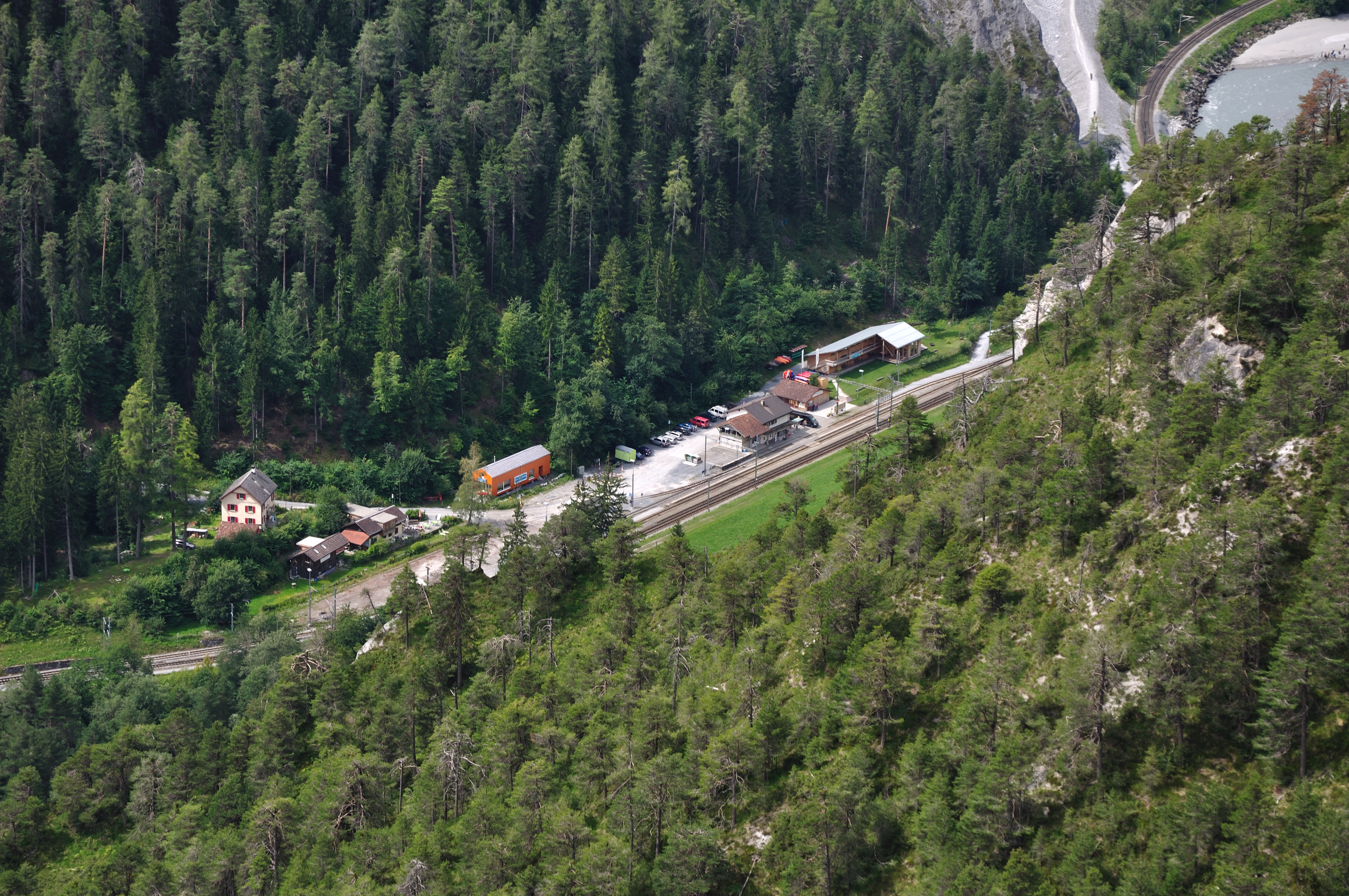
Versam-Safien station on the valley floor

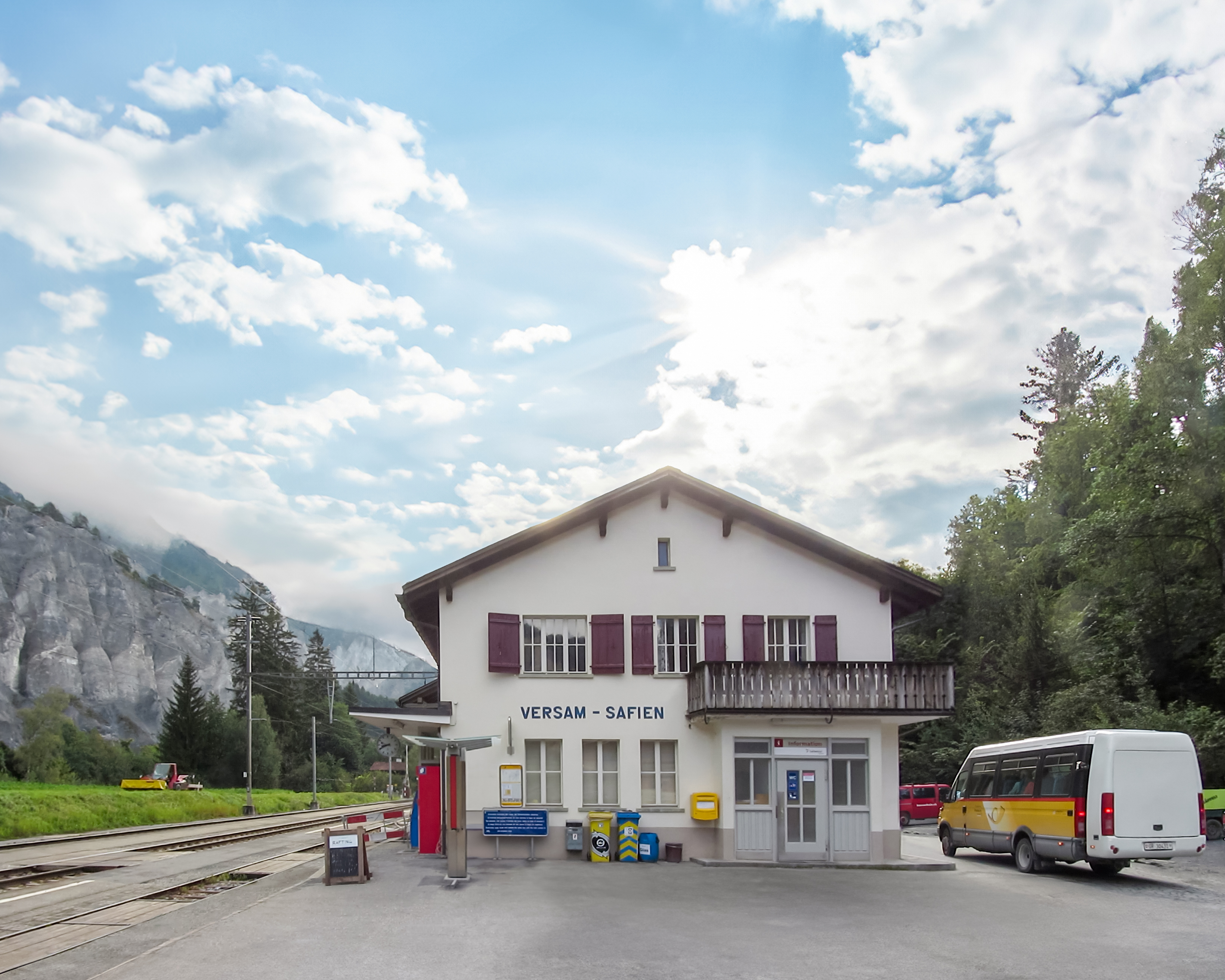
PostAuto departing from Versam-Safien station

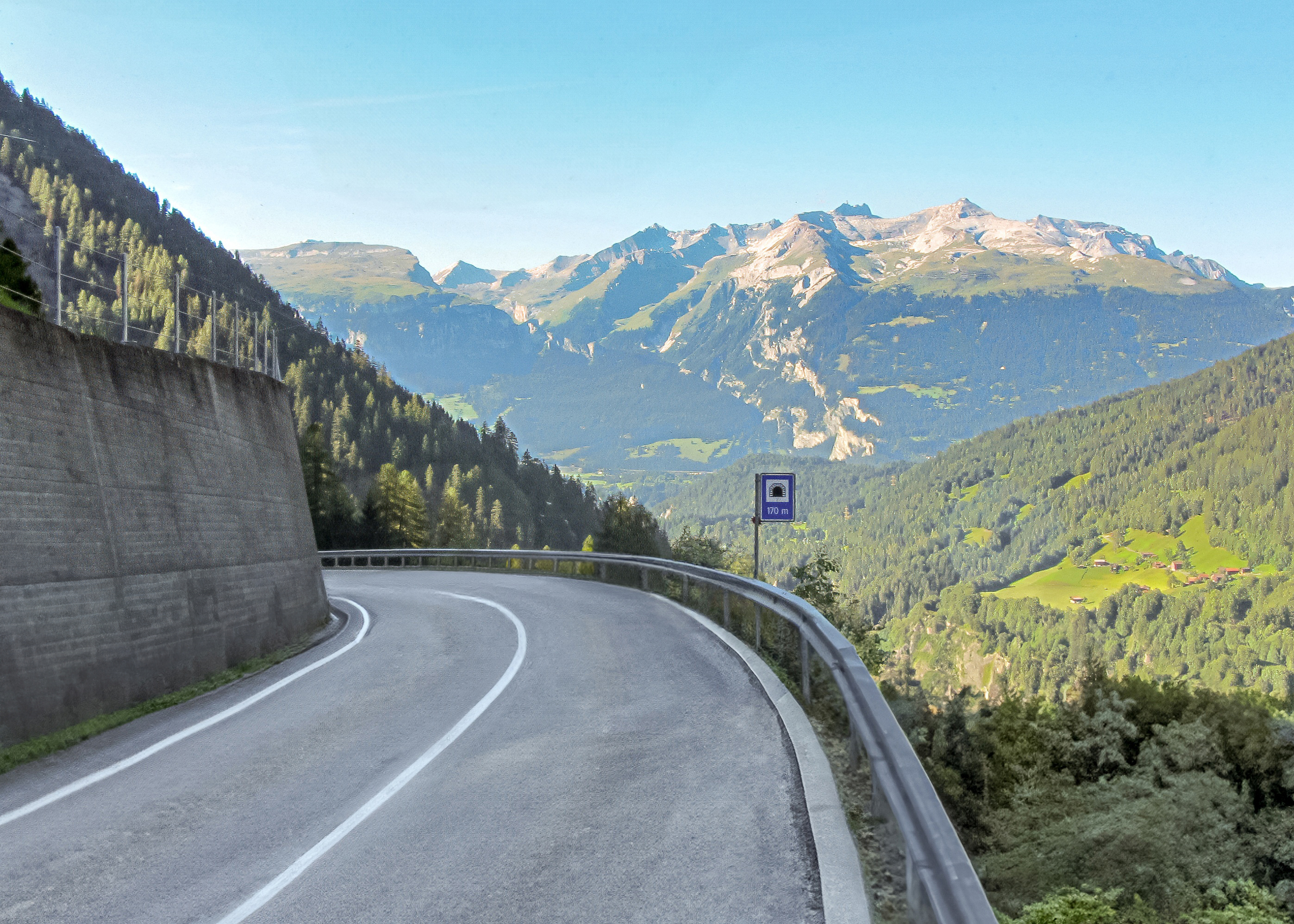
Acla Road (Tenna to Versam)

== Gallery ==
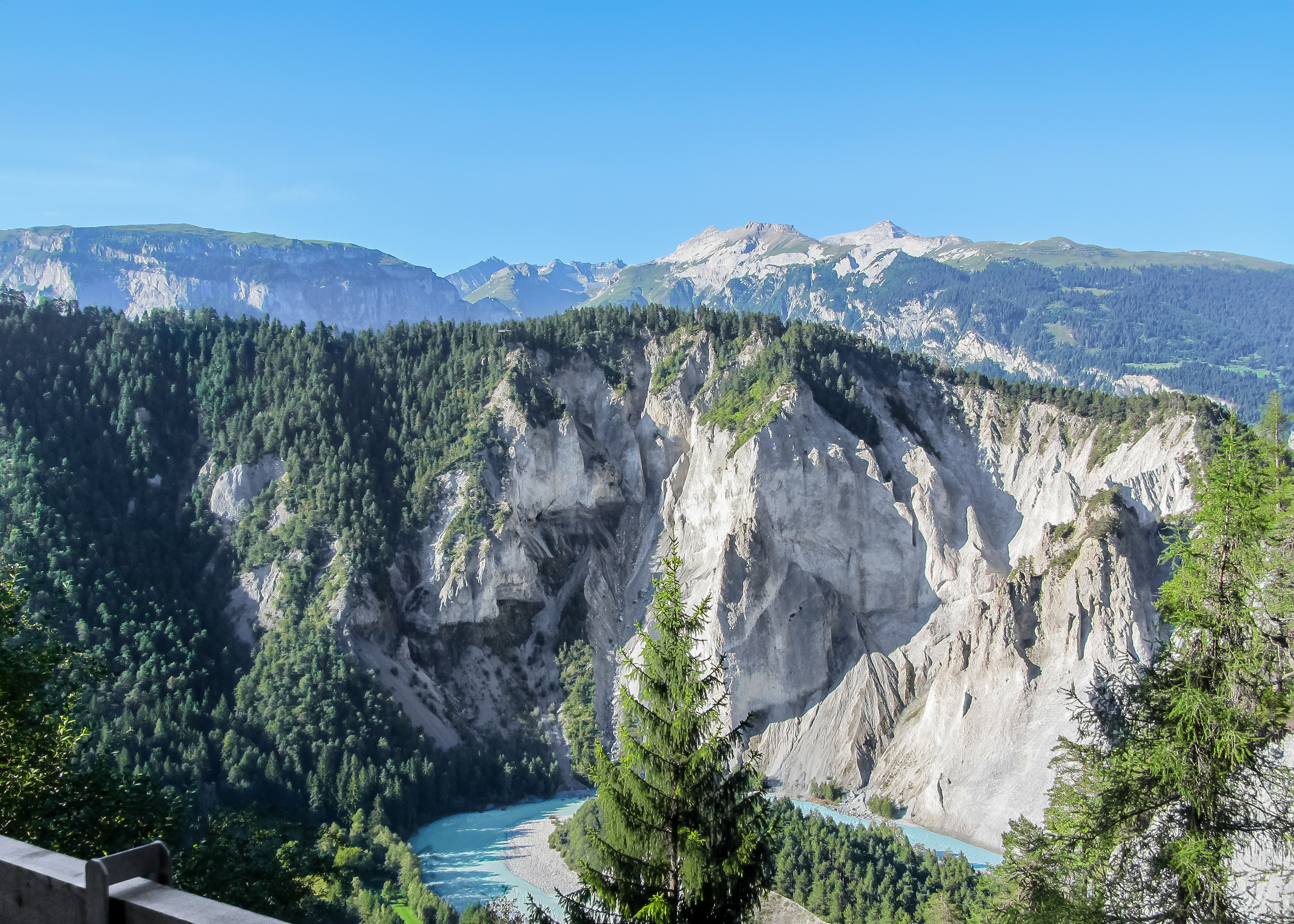
Ruinaulta canyon as seen from Islabord bus stop

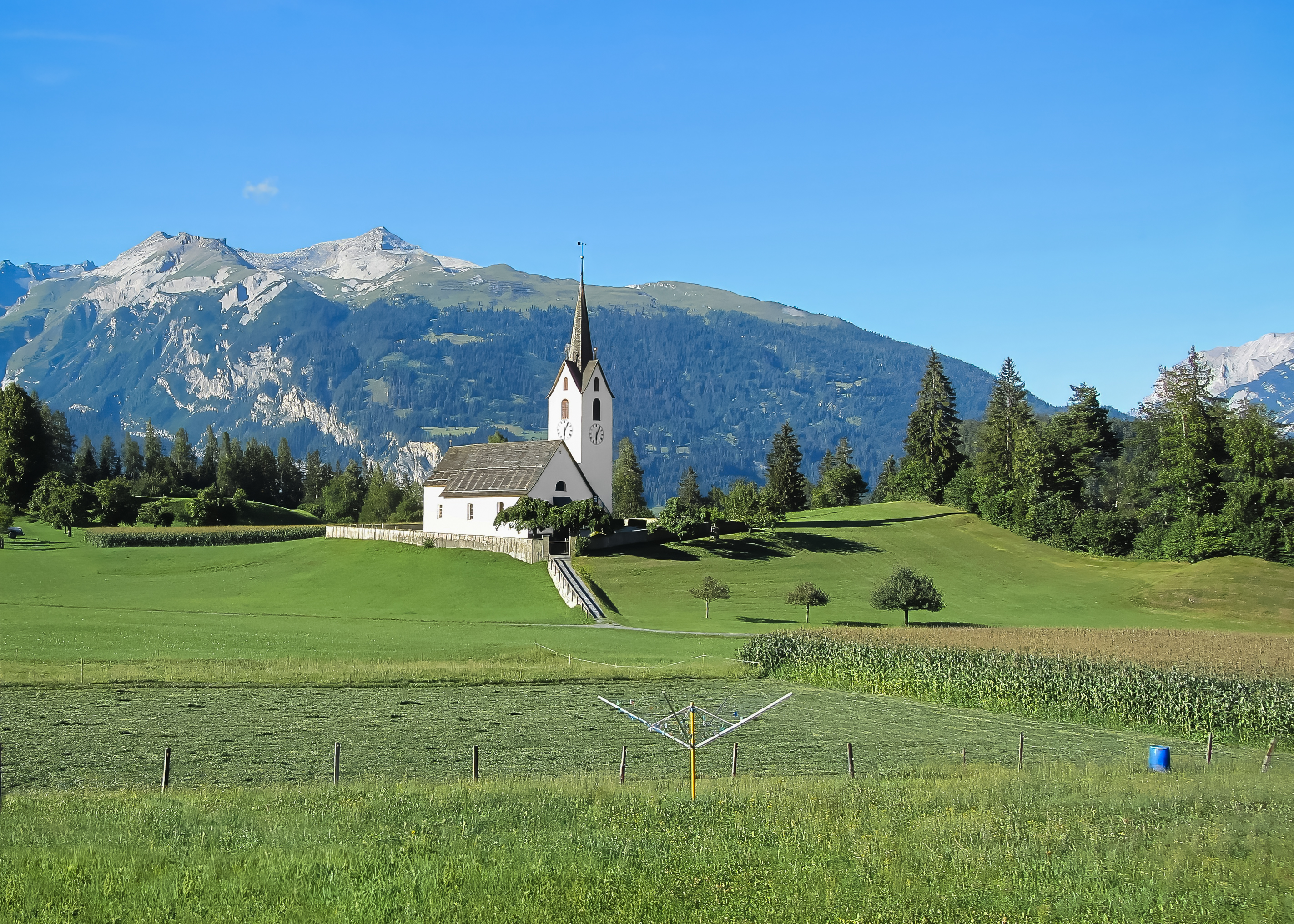
Versam's church as seen from a PostAuto trip

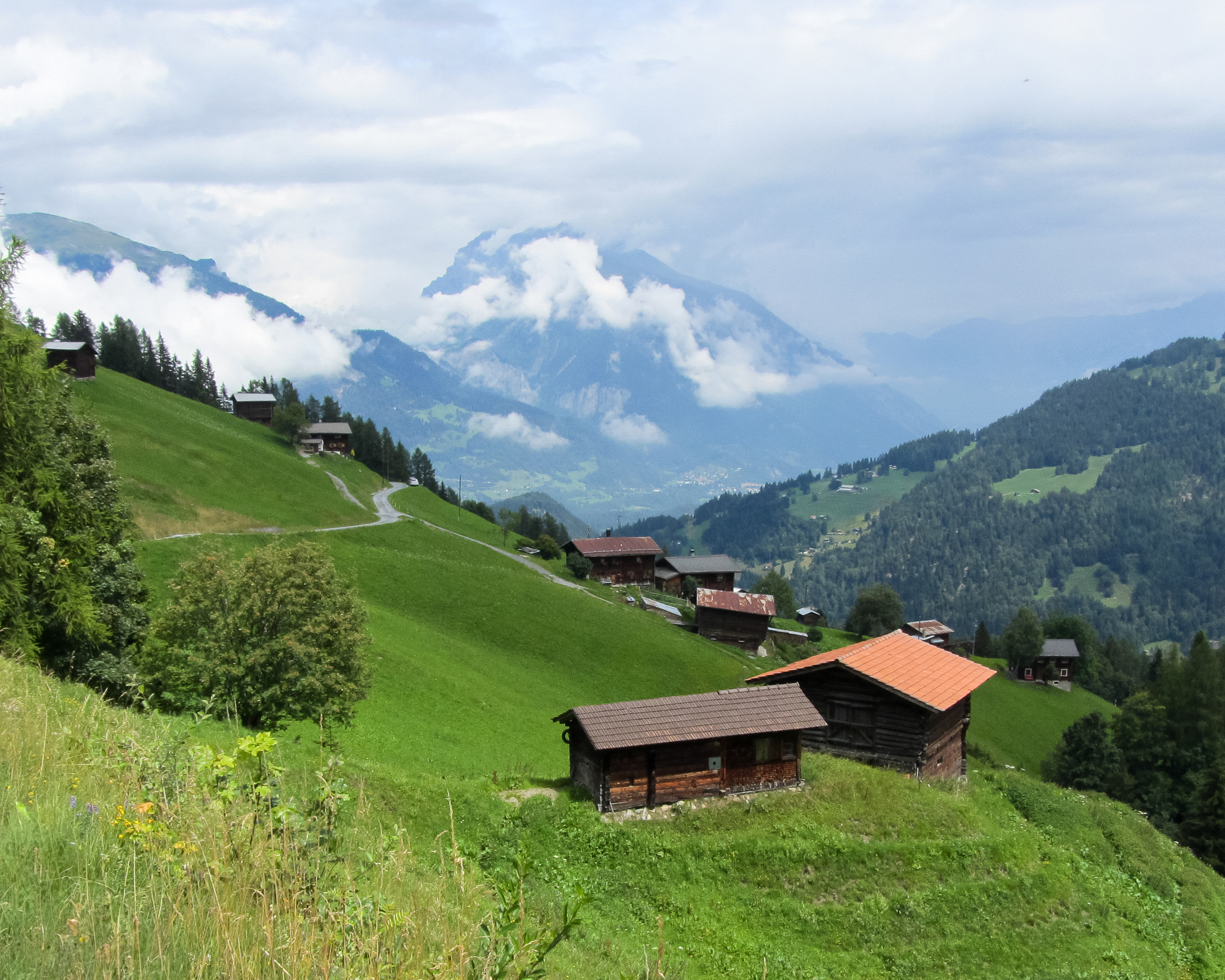
Chalets in Versam

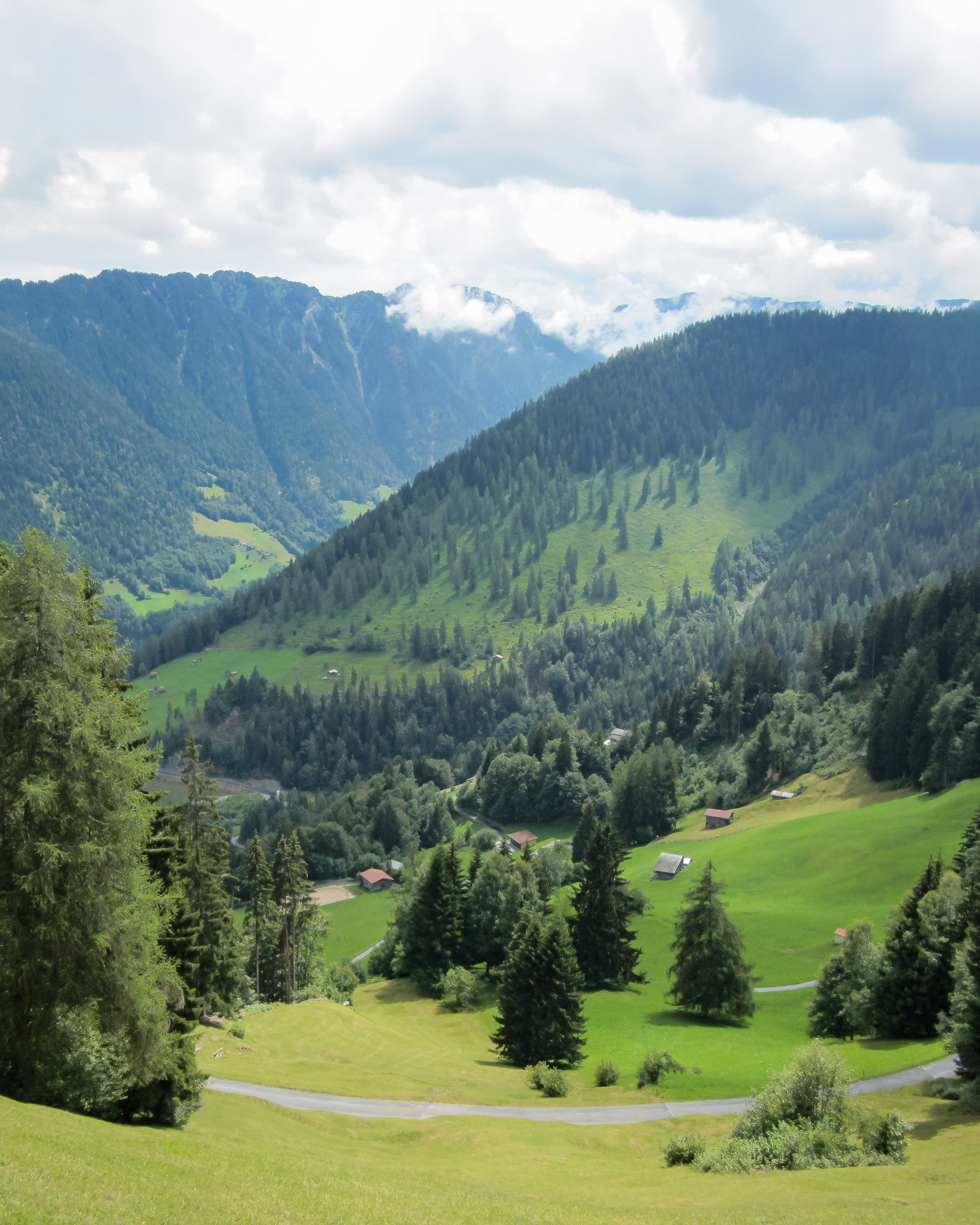
Safien Valley from Versam

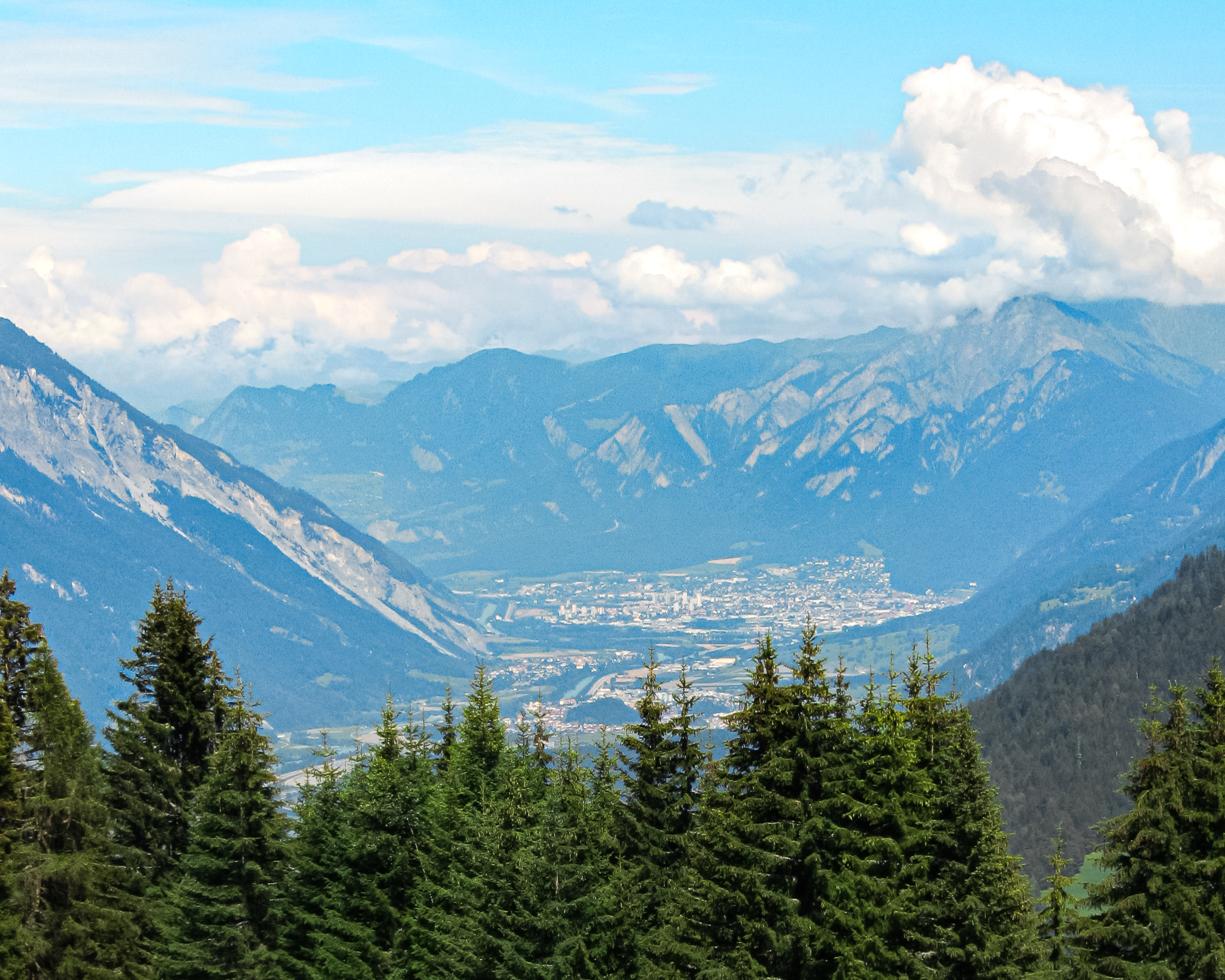
Chur from Versam
