= Waldhaus Flims =

Hotel in Switzerland

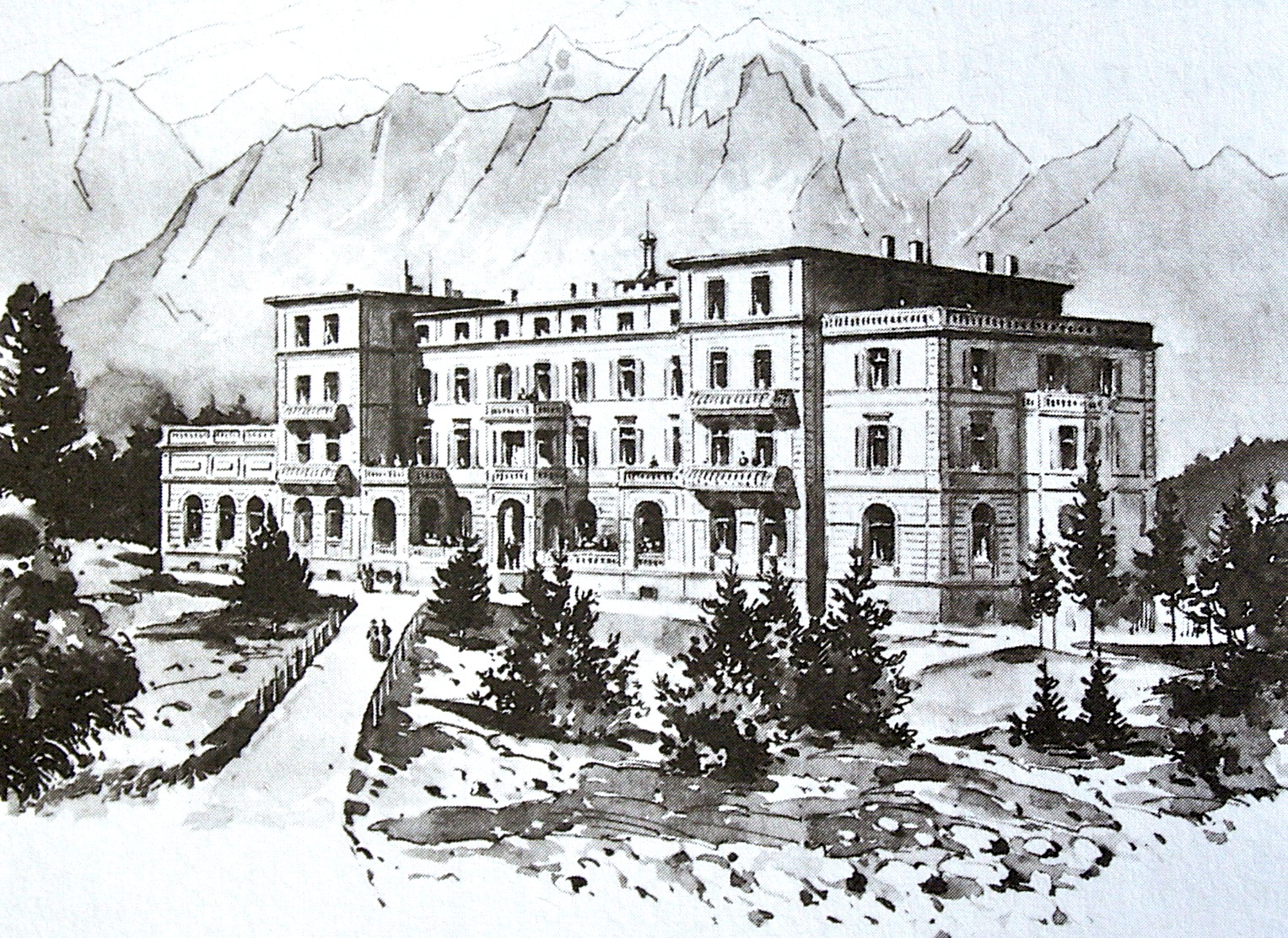

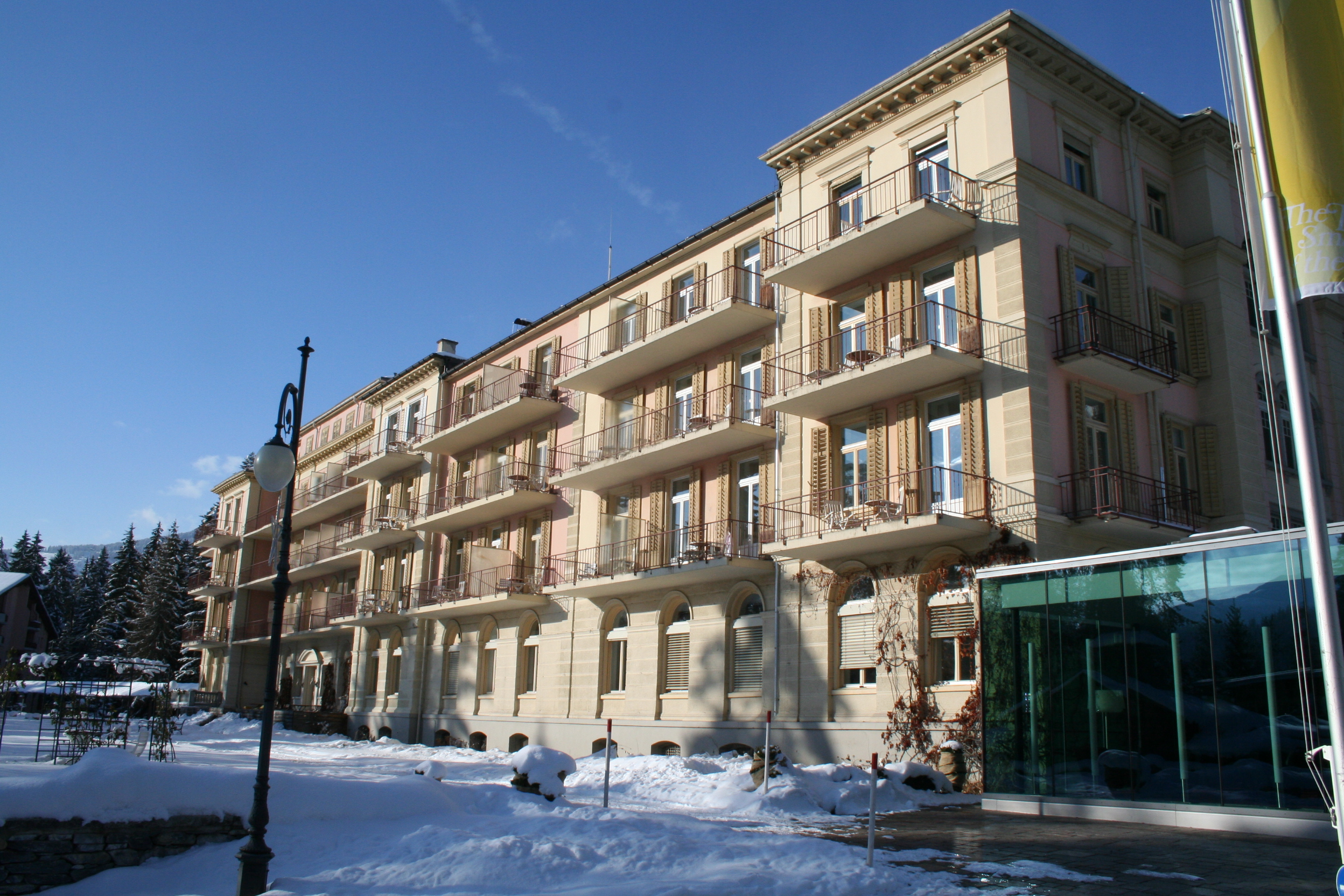
- The Waldhaus Flims (1877 & 2009)

- Location within Switzerland

General information
- Location: Flims, Graubünden, Switzerland
- Coordinates: 46°49′35″N 9°17′11″E
- Opening: 1877

Design and construction
- Developer: Peter-Jakob Bener-Caviezel; Paul Lorenz

Other information
- Number of rooms: 150 (2014)

Website
- Official site

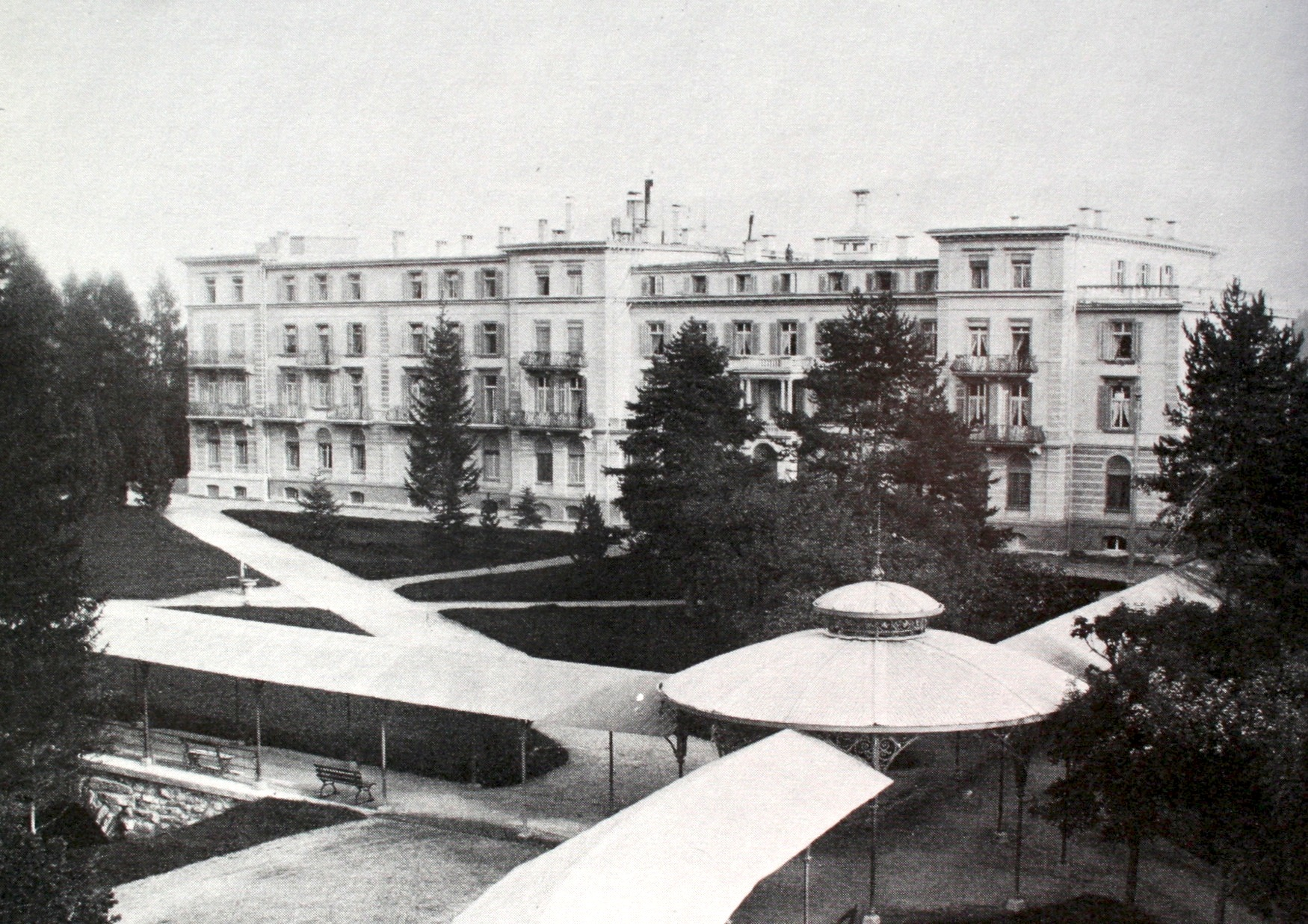
The "Hotel Waldhaus" (1906)

The Waldhaus Flims is a five star hotel in Flims, a resort village to the west of Chur, in the eastern Swiss canton of Graubünden (Grigioni/Grisons).

The hotel was founded in 1877 as the "Hotel Waldhaus" at a time when the tourism potential of the Swiss Alps was leading to rapid growth in the sector. In 2008, following a major building programme, the Hotel Waldhaus was rebranded as the "Waldhaus Flims Mountain Resort & Spa". In 2015 the business was forced by heavy indebtedness into bankruptcy and 900 shareholders lost their investment, although confidence was expressed that following financial restructuring, likely to include the sale to second home-buyers of holiday apartments included in what had by this time become a major hotel complex, the hotel would survive.

The Waldhaus offers 333 beds in 150 guest rooms, 16 seminar/banquet/conference rooms and 6 restaurants, distributed across several buildings. There are three main buildings. The "Grand Hotel Waldhaus" building is a grand hotel, its architecture resonant of the confidence engendered by rapid economic expansion during the later nineteenth century, in a style described as "classical feudal" ("klassisch-feudal"). The other principal buildings are the "rustic Grand Chalet Belmont" and the "Villa Silvana", in effect another small luxury hotel built in a "summer house" style. There is also a "Jugendstil (Art nouveau)" pavilion with a conference room, restaurants and bars. The Waldhaus complex is today the largest "hotel park" in Switzerland, with a total foot-print of 200,000 square meters, and around 24 separate buildings.

== History ==
=== Origins ===
The origins of the Waldhaus go back to the foundation in 1869 of the "Waldhaus-Flims cure and lake-bathing establishment" ("Kur- und Seebadanstalt Waldhaus Flims"). Two businessmen from Chur, Peter-Jakob Bener-Caviezel and Paul Lorenz obtained a concession to build a spa centre. 60 shares, each of 5,000 Swiss francs, were offered for subscription, which was underwritten with a guarantee from the municipality. The company was also guaranteed exclusive use of the Caumasee (lake), and provided with a large undeveloped knoll, covered with larch woods and pasture, located beyond the foresters' huts on the edge of the village, for a price of 50 Rappen (half a Swiss Franc) per square meter. By 1875 all the shares had been subscribed and building began. A 120-bed hotel was built under the direction of a St.Gallen architectural firm called "Lorenz". The project also included construction of a sawmill, a post office with stable and refreshment facilities for horses and postmen, a laundry, a cow stall, a water supply from the Prausura Spring and a small bathing station by the lake. The Spa Hotel ("Kurhaus") was opened in 1877, with a fresh running water supply in the kitchen. The entire site was criss-crossed by a network of walking trails which connected the nearby Tuffstein Spring and the "natural garden" (Rondell), or leading behind the Hotel Segnes to a viewing point taking in the rock cliffs. Many of these walking trails would later be destroyed to make way for further building development. Areas of the parkland, which had formerly been pasture, became forested now that they were no longer grazed.

The new facility was placed under the direction of Johann Guggenbühl, a hotel professional who had till that point been in charge of the Zürcherhof (hotel) in Zürich.

=== Boom years ===
Business was good. In 1881 the "Villa Belmont" was built as an overspill annex for the main hotel, which increased the total number of beds from 120 to 200. A spa doctor was recruited and the franchisee managing the cow stalls was encouraged to add ducks and chickens to his livestock operation. Subsequently, a pig house, a horse stable and a new cow house with its own onsite dairy were added.

The clientele was international: Russian, French, British, American, Austrian and Dutch guests often stayed in the spa hotel for several months at a time. Swiss guests generally stayed for only a few weeks. The island in the middle of the Caumasee (lake) was purchased in 1884. In response to growth in demand for "luxury rooms", the "Villa Silvana" was built, opening in 1889. That was also the year in which an onsite generating station was constructed and the hotel gained an electricity supply, delivering what was described at the time as 60 "horsepower", which made it the largest private power station in the canton. At the same time the room rate was increased from 6.50 to 7.00 Swiss francs.

The Waldhaus lost its first director in 1892 when Johann Guggenbühl died following a short illness. He was succeeded by his wife, who ran the business with her two daughters. The Company Secretary, Joseph Zahnder, was permitted only to undertake the "greeting and valediction" duties with the guests. For the stay in 1893 of the child Dutch Queen Wilhelmina with the Regent-Queen Mother, a room in the recently completed Villa Silvana had its walls lined with pine timber, and new furniture delivered.

Secretary Zahnder got his turn at the top job in 1893 when Guggenbühl's widow also died. The hotel was now directed by Joseph Zahnder with the two Guggenbühl daughters. In 1894 a new bakehouse was constructed along with a new timber fueled heating stove. Twenty-first century developments were adumbrated with the creation of a what was in effect a "fitness centre" (the Freiluftbad) which incorporated a range of sports facilities and equipment, separated between those for women and those for men.

Instead of the conventional "Table d’hôte" catering arrangements, guests were now able to pay extra and be served their personal choice of dishes at individual tables. In 1895 traditional toilet facilities were replaced with modern wcs, which necessitated the construction of a reservoir. Just a year later all three of the hotel blocks were equipped with piped hot water and baths.

=== Twentieth century expansion ===
In 1900 the adjacent "Curhaus Segnes" spa hotel (today the "Restaurant Pomodoro") was acquired. Continued growth of the Waldhaus hotel complex was overseen by the Walthers, the couple who were now directing the business. In 1901 the hotel received its first tennis court and its own telephone, placed in a purpose built "kiosk" which was located a safe distance from the main buildings because there were fears of damage from a "short circuit". When, later in the century, the car park was extended the telephone kiosk was relocated to the lakeside. Its subsequent fate and present location are unknown, however.

In 1904 the Jugendstil (Art nouveau) "casino" was built as an entertainment venue. All the buildings were now connected to one another with covered walkways (replaced in the 1970s by tunnels which provide more convincing weather protection). By 1904 the spa complex offered more than 437 guest beds, and the enterprise was backed by 1.1 Million Swiss francs of share capital. The room rate was raised to 8.00 francs. The next year Eduard and Clara Bezzola, whose Romansch family name hints at their provenance on the other side of the canton took over at the Waldhaus from the Walthers. In 1908 the former "Post Hotel" was integrated into the complex and renamed as the "Bellavista" (today the "China Restaurant").

By 1910 the telephone had survived for ten years in its kiosk without inflicting damage, and the telephone connection was therefore extended to the main hotel building. At this stage some of the rooms also received "en suite" bath facilities.

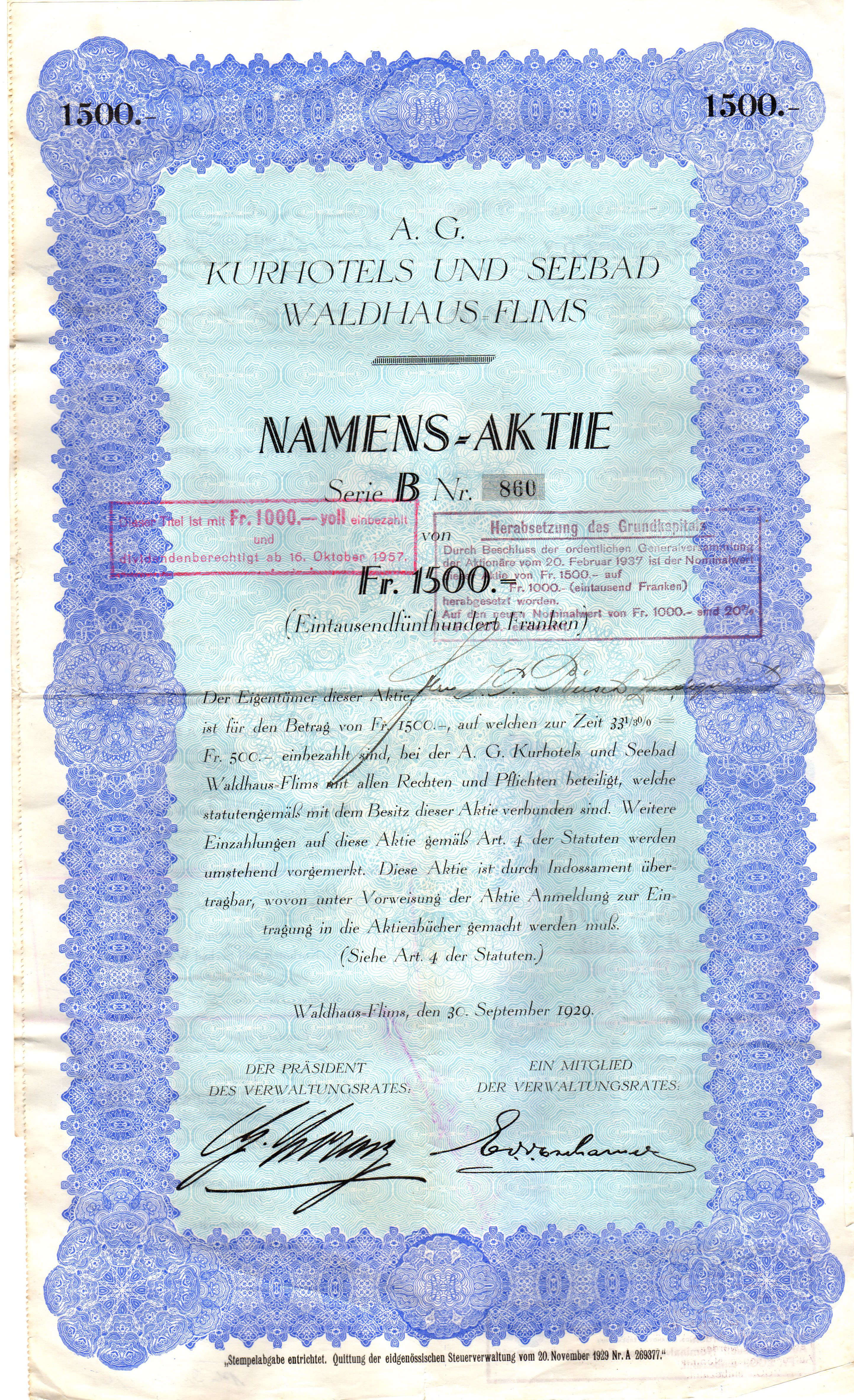
Share of the AG Kurhotels und Seebad Waldhaus-Flims, issued 30. September 1929

Topography has kept the railway away from Flims, but the hotel received its first summer season Postbus service in 1920. The open topped charabanc, known as the "Car Alpin", greatly improved guest access. For winter season work a Postbus equipped with Caterpillar tracks (US-English: Continuous track) was introduced in 1926. Within the hotel complex, additional "en suite" bath facilities and running water installations were added during the 1920s. In 1923, after nearly half a century as the "Kur- und Seebadanstalt", the operating company changed its name to "AG Kurhotels und Seebad", while the hotel complex was now called "Park Hotels Waldhaus".

Some of the canton's conservative elements bitterly resisted the lifting of the ban on motor cars, grudgingly enacted in the mid 1920s. Nevertheless, by the time the Waldhaus celebrated its fiftieth anniversary in 1927 car use was no longer restricted to doctors and ambulance drivers: many guests were arriving in private cars.

In the dining room, "Table d’hôte" menues were abandoned. Switzerland received large numbers of political and economic migrants from Italy during the 1920s and 1930s, and at the Waldhaus Italian waiters replaced the locally recruited serving maids "Saaltöchter" who had hitherto served the meals. Roman Bezzola was appointed a director of the hotel, although Eduard and Clara Bezzola remained in charge, as "General Directors", till 1943. Bookings plunged in 1936 to the lowest level since 1915 due to fears triggered by a Polio epidemic that hit several Swiss cantons, including Graubünden, during the summer months. The opportunity was taken to set out a new nine-hole golf course, although this only remained operational till 1941. Caumasee-Lift was opened in 1937.

Roman and Elsa Bezzola took over in 1943. Switzerland was badly impacted by the war that had broken out in surrounding countries in 1939: international tourists and food imports disappeared. Open areas in the hotel grounds were given over to the cultivation of vegetables, wheat and potatoes. A chicken and duck breeding programme was set up. Military uniforms were seen in the hotel and military officers who appeared to fill the otherwise empty hotel complex were welcome guests.

After 70 years focused on summer business, in 1947, following extensive renovations, the Waldhaus opened for its first full winter season. The decision was driven by the opening a couple of years earlier of the Flims Cable car and the first Foppa-Naruas chairlift up the mountainside, both from a base-station beside the Waldhaus complex. In 1948 the Waldhaus for the first time also opened for the off-peak "shoulder seasons" before and after the main winter season. In the same year the former general director Eduard Bezzola died, following a long illness. During the 1950s the former Kurhaus hotel developed as a less formal holiday-sport hotel, with mid-day buffet lunches and an increased focus on special celebrations in the "Tschaler" dance-bar, which also provided an important operating base for a growing number of ski instructors. With improved roads and transport links there was an increase in short-stay overnight and weekend break visitors. Following a succession of developments and redevelopments of kitchen, dining and dancing facilities, and of the cellar space, 1962 brought a more substantial rebuilding project when a wing was added to the Hotel Segnes, which now provided 120 beds. At the same time the main hotel building received a new entrance hall and a new dining room extension.

In June 1967 a covered swimming pool was added and a new Curling facility was installed. In 1969 the Caumasee (lake), together with its bathing and other recreational facilities, was sold back to the municipality. The period was one of further growth, with revenues increasing by 10% each year. (The Swiss annual inflation rate averaged only 2.52% between 1956 and 2015, despite briefly rising above 5% in the late 1960s.) Shareholders were receiving dividends equivalent to 9% of the par value of their shares.

=== Modern times ===
In 1970 the Hotel Bellavista was converted to a Hotel Garni (bed and breakfast hotel). A year later the 1904 Jugendstil (Art nouveau) pavilion was restored. In 1972 the individual buildings were connected to each other with tunnels. For children and their parents the hotel created its own Kindergarten facility.

In 1975, after a 40-year term as general director, Roman Bezzola was succeeded in the top job by Hugo Nussli-Bezzola and his wife. An organisational restructuring saw the post of general director abolished, and a new director, named Riet Frey, took over while the former general director, Hugo Nussli, remained a board member.

An underground parking garage was added only in 1981, together with two apartment blocks called, "Runca" and "Miramunt". Buyers of the holiday apartments received entitlement to use of the hotel facilities. The sale profits from the holiday apartments were used to fund a redesign and renovation for the Hotel Belmont, which was reopened in 1984, which was the year in which gross income exceeded 10 Million francs for the first time. Direction of the hotel was taken over by Josef and Marianne Müller. By 1988 the Hotel Segnes was no longer operating as a hotel, and it was converted into a restaurant, the "Pomodoro", while its guest rooms were reassigned fas staff accommodation. The former Hotel Bellavista later went the same way, becoming a Chinese restaurant.

In 1990 the company name was changed from "AG Kurhotels Flims-Waldhaus" to "Park Hotels Waldhaus AG".

=== Museum ===
A museum celebrating the hotel's Belle Époque was created in 1992 in the cellar underneath the Casino-Pavilion. Numerous old fixtures were retrieved from their storage locations and used to document the history of the Waldhaus, which by now tracked back more than a century. After the exhibition commemorating the local architect Rudolf Olgiati opened in 1996, the crystal collection of the geologist Paul Membrini went on display in what had been the pavilion's white wine cellar.

=== New century: new beginnings ===
After nearly twenty years in charge, Josef and Marianne Müller left in 2000. Their successors, Christoph and Sabina Schlosser stayed only until 2010 which was when directorship of the resort complex was taken over by Yasmin and Urs Grimm Cachemaille.

Between 2003 and 2005 the Villa Silvana was extensively renovated. The 1967 indoor swimming pool was replaced by a new glass-enclosed swimming and wellness center. The architects were Hans Peter Fontana from Flims and Pia Schmid from Zürich. The pavilion's old terrace was recreated along with the Jugendstil (Art nouveau) features of the entrance lobby and reception area. On the site of the old laundry another holiday apartment block, "Wald Park", was built. Two more blocks, named "Ententeich" and "La Cauma" were added in 2005 and 2007. In 2009 the larch trees were removed from the original Rondell Park, north of the Hotel Segnes, in order to make space for a large promenade.

=== Media exposure ===
In 2004 national television used the Waldhaus for a six-part mini-series, which presented "everyday life in a five star hotel" in a docu-drama format. A television gala presentation was transmitted from the hotel in August 2006. Later that year part of a Parliamentary session was held in the Waldhaus.

=== Financing ===
2006 was also the year in which the substantial shareholding accumulated by the Bezzola in the hotel complex was sold, to be taken over by Hans Rudolf Wyss. The shareholding changes were accompanied by a further name change, from "Park Hotels Waldhaus AG" to "Waldhaus Flims Mountain Resort AG".

On 7 April 2015 the company was declared bankrupt, with a funding shortfall initially reported at 30 million francs. The running of the hotel was contracted by the receivers to a management company called "WF Hotel Management GmbH": the complex continued to welcome holiday makers while a permanent solution for the financial challenges was sought. By August 2015 the reported cash deficit had increased to more than 40 Million francs, but this was still comfortably less than the estimated value of the assets. In an interview given to the travel press Gion Fravi, the hotel director installed by the management company, stated that around 40 investors had expressed an interest in purchasing the assets, though he refused to enter into speculation about a possible sale price, given the pressure on running costs exacerbated by the increasing value of the Swiss Franc against the Euro in the wake of the 2007 financial crash. During the closing months of 2015 the hotel was advertising jobs for the 2015/2016 season.

== The Flims Panorama ==
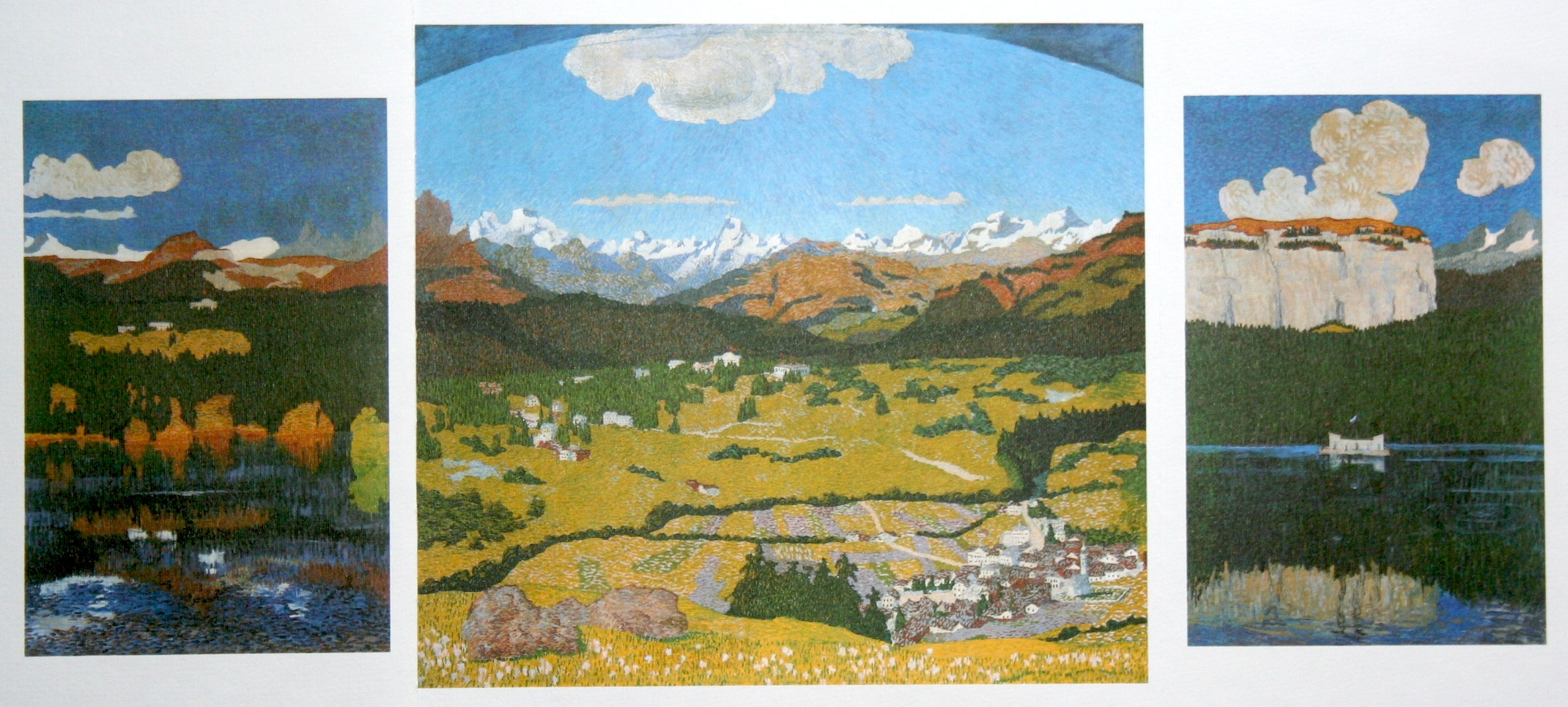
The Flims Panorama by Giovanni Giacometti (1904)

A triptych entitled "The Flims Panorama" was commissioned by the hotel director in 1904 from Giovanni Giacometti and presented to the hotel to celebrate the opening of the casino-pavilion in 1904. However, on the occasion of the buildings's first major restoration the triptych was taken down it was subsequently hung in the pavilion's entrance lobby for a period.

During a subsequent renovation, in 1968 the hotel director of the time, Roman Bezzola, asked the Fine Arts Museum in Chur about the value of the Giacometti triptych. The Museum were dismissive, warned that costly restoration would be necessary, and even rejected an offer to gift the piece to them. They dismissed Giacometti as a mere "poster artist". The painting was rolled up and stored. However, in 1986 tastes had moved on, and the recently appointed hotel director Josef Müller rediscovered the work, recognized its value and had it restored, after which it hanged in the main lobby.

On the occasion of the 2016 renovation, the new owners of the hotel decided to auction the artwork. A Swiss private collector bid on it in June 2016 and won the painting for 4.05 million Swiss Francs (including auction fees).

== See also ==
- List of hotels in Switzerland
- Tourism in Switzerland
