= Crestasee =

Lake in the Grisons, Switzerland

- Lag la Cresta
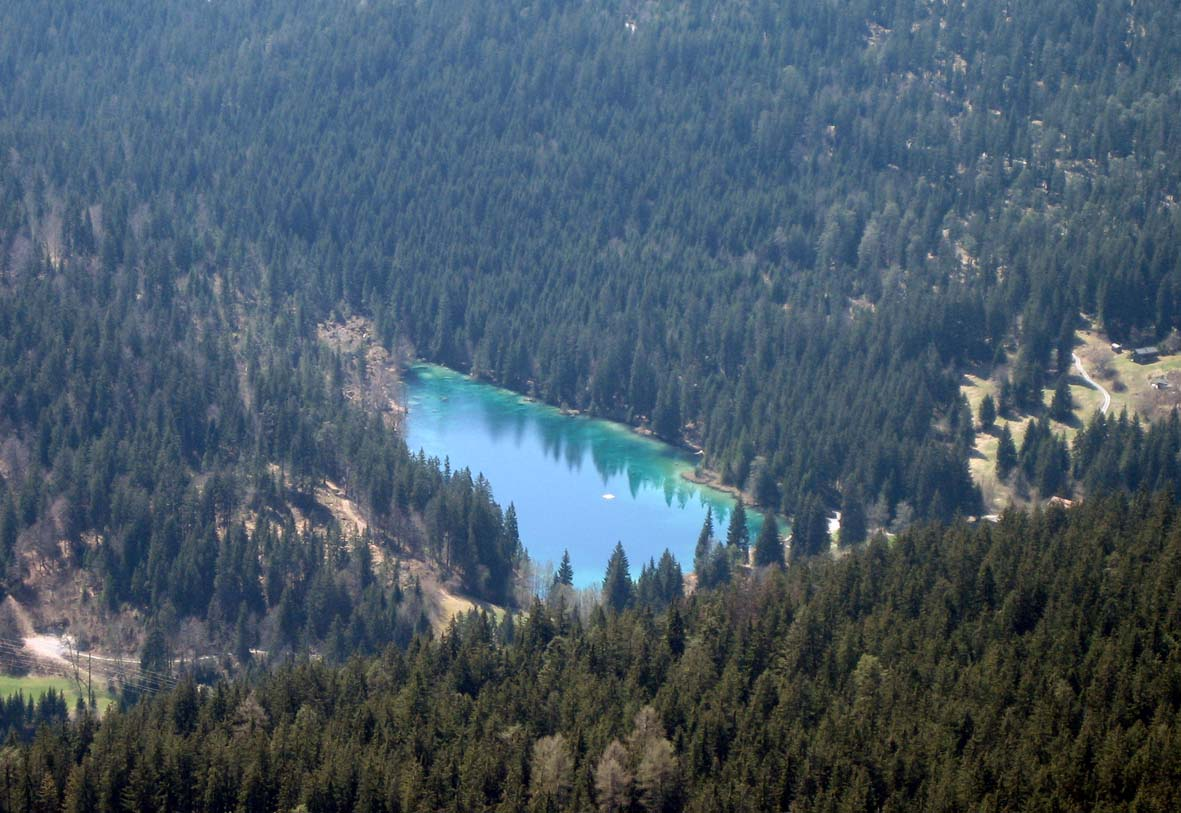

- Location within Canton of Graubünden Location within Switzerland Location within Alps
- Interactive map of Crestasee
- Location: Flims/Trin, Grisons
- Coordinates: 46°49′54″N 9°19′16″E
- Primary inflows: none
- Primary outflows: nameless
- Basin countries: Switzerland
- Max. length: 280 m (310 yd)
- Max. width: 140 m (150 yd)
- Surface area: 4.7 ha (12 acres)
- Surface elevation: 844 m (2,769 ft)
- Frozen: December to March
- Islands: none
- Settlements: none

Crestasee (Romansh: Lag la Cresta) is a small lake shared by the municipalities of Flims and Trin in the Grisons, Switzerland. From 1892 a guest house on its northern end served as pension and still is a restaurant today in its original state.

== Geography ==
There is no tributary to the lake. The rough character of the whole area derives from being a debris area of the gigantic Flims Rockslide, where waters flow underground until feeding lakes at certain spots such as Crestasee, Caumasee or Lag Prau Pulté.

Less than 100 yards (91 m) from its northern end a gorge called "Felsbachschlucht" is formed by river Flem, coming from Flims, whose Romansh name is also Flem. The waters from the lake and river are independent, and of course the river had only some 10 000 years to create the gorge as this is the age of the rockslide.

The water from the lake forms a small stream and enters the Flem river after a very short run, not called a special name for its short length.

In summer it is well known for swimming and offers facilities (such as a kiosk, toilets, changing room, boats and SUP's to rent) to enjoy this. An entrance charge will be collected by an employee of the restaurant, walking around the lake once or twice a day. Crestasee can be reached from Flims via the Felsbachschlucht gorge or wide forest paths, as well as from Trin Mulin or the public post car stop Felsbach/Crestasee on the main road, to where it is connected by a nice and short path. Motorists have to walk a similar distance to the lake, as there is no access to the lake by car and signposted parking is well off the lake. A forest walk leads to Conn, to see the Ruinaulta gorge formed by the Rhine, still within the same huge rockslide debris area, or to the Lag la Cauma.

== See also ==
- List of mountain lakes of Switzerland
