= Lag Tuleritg =

Lag Prau Tuleritg
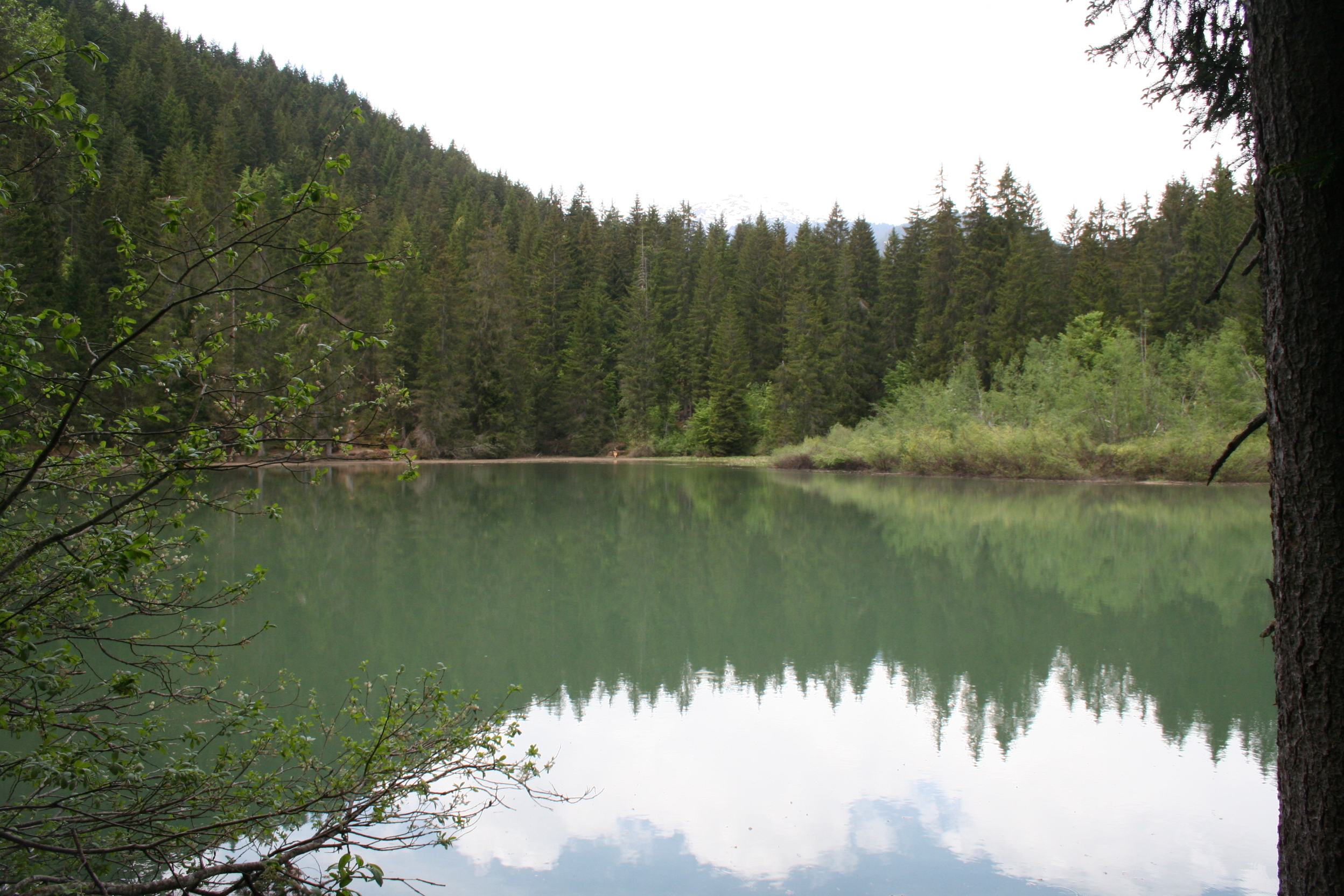

- Location within Canton of Graubünden Location within Switzerland Location within Italy Location within Alps
- Interactive map of Lag Prau Tuleritg
- Location: Flims, Grisons
- Coordinates: 46.821°N 9.283°E
- Type: part time lake
- Primary inflows: nameless
- Primary outflows: none
- Basin countries: Switzerland
- Max. length: 180 m (590 ft)
- Max. width: 80 m (260 ft)
- Max. depth: 2 m (6 ft 7 in)
- Residence time: one summer
- Frozen: empty during winter!
- Islands: none

Lag Tuleritg is a lake at Flims in the canton of Grisons, Switzerland.

== Geography ==
As close as 500 metres to the Caumasee, well known for swimming, is another dell, home of Lag Tuleritg which is just 18 metres higher. This lake falls completely dry in autumn and remains empty until being filled by a small river of just about half a mile in length (falling some 100 metres in level) that will start flowing around May depending on temperatures and snow melt rate in the mountains. Its origin is another lake, Lag Prau Pulté, which is fed by underground water only in spring, disappearing in autumn and staying dry all winter. During a cold period in spring, water that entered the dell of this lake may disappear again as snow melt decreases and all water remains in the underground flow. Due to its origin the water of both lakes is grey all summer until the level starts to go down in autumn. In Lag Prau Pulte one can see another special effect caused by air being forced out of the underground, causing the lake not only to remain grey but offering frequent bubbles on the surface.

Because its proximity it is very likely that the water from Lag Tuleritg continues underground to Caumasee, although no experiments using colour was ever to prove this.

At 1015m above sea level, it is known as the crescent-shaped lake amid the pines. The lake is shallow, in many parts less than a metre deep, and only reaches a depth of 2-3 metres on the eastern side. During August, the water begins to recede. In autumn the lake dries up completely, although the outflow is invisible. The water flows underground to Lake Cauma.
