= Caumasee-Lift =

Funicular/inclined elevator at Flims, Graubünden, Switzerland

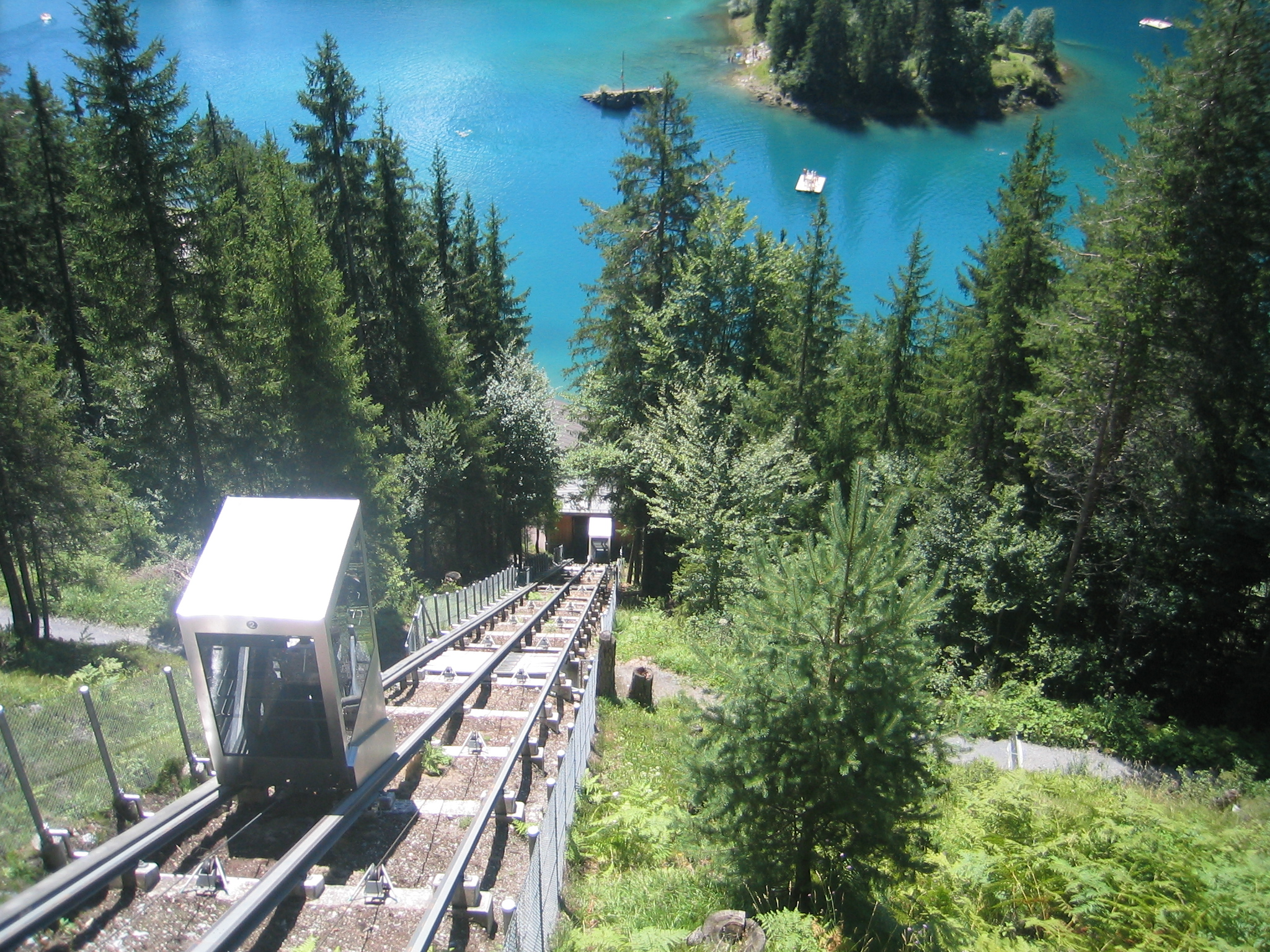
- Funiculars and lake (2008)

Overview
- Status: In operation (generally summer season)
- Owner: Gemeinde Flims (since 1974); Genossenschaft Caumaseelift (1937-1974)
- Locale: Flims, Graubünden, Switzerland
- Termini: Caumasee; Via Dil Lag/Caumaseeweg
- Stations: 2
- Website: caumasee.ch

Service
- Type: Funicular (inclined elevator)
- Rolling stock: 2 for 12 passengers each

History
- Opened: 1937
- Automation, extension: 1990

Technical
- Line length: 125 m (410 ft) (since 1990)
- Number of tracks: 2
- Track gauge: 1,600 mm (5 ft 3 in)
- Conduction system: automated since 1990
- Highest elevation: 1,075 m (3,527 ft)
- Maximum incline: approx. 35%

Caumasee-Lift is a funicular at Flims, Canton of Graubünden, Switzerland. It provides access to Caumasee at 1003 m - with its bath and restaurant - from an upper station at 1075 m, on Via Dil Lag in Flims Waldhaus. Since 1990, the installation consists of a pair of fully automated inclined elevators. The track has a length of 125 m at an incline of 35%. The upper station can be reached by foot in 10 minutes from the bus stop "Flims-Waldhaus, Caumasee“.

Hotel Waldhaus operated an extensive bath at the lake. The elevator was built in 1937, on the initiative of the owner of the hotel, by Wagons- und Aufzügefabrik Schlieren for Genossenschaft Caumaseelift. The cooperative sold it to the municipality of Flims in 1974.
