= Crap Sogn Gion =

Mountain in Switzerland

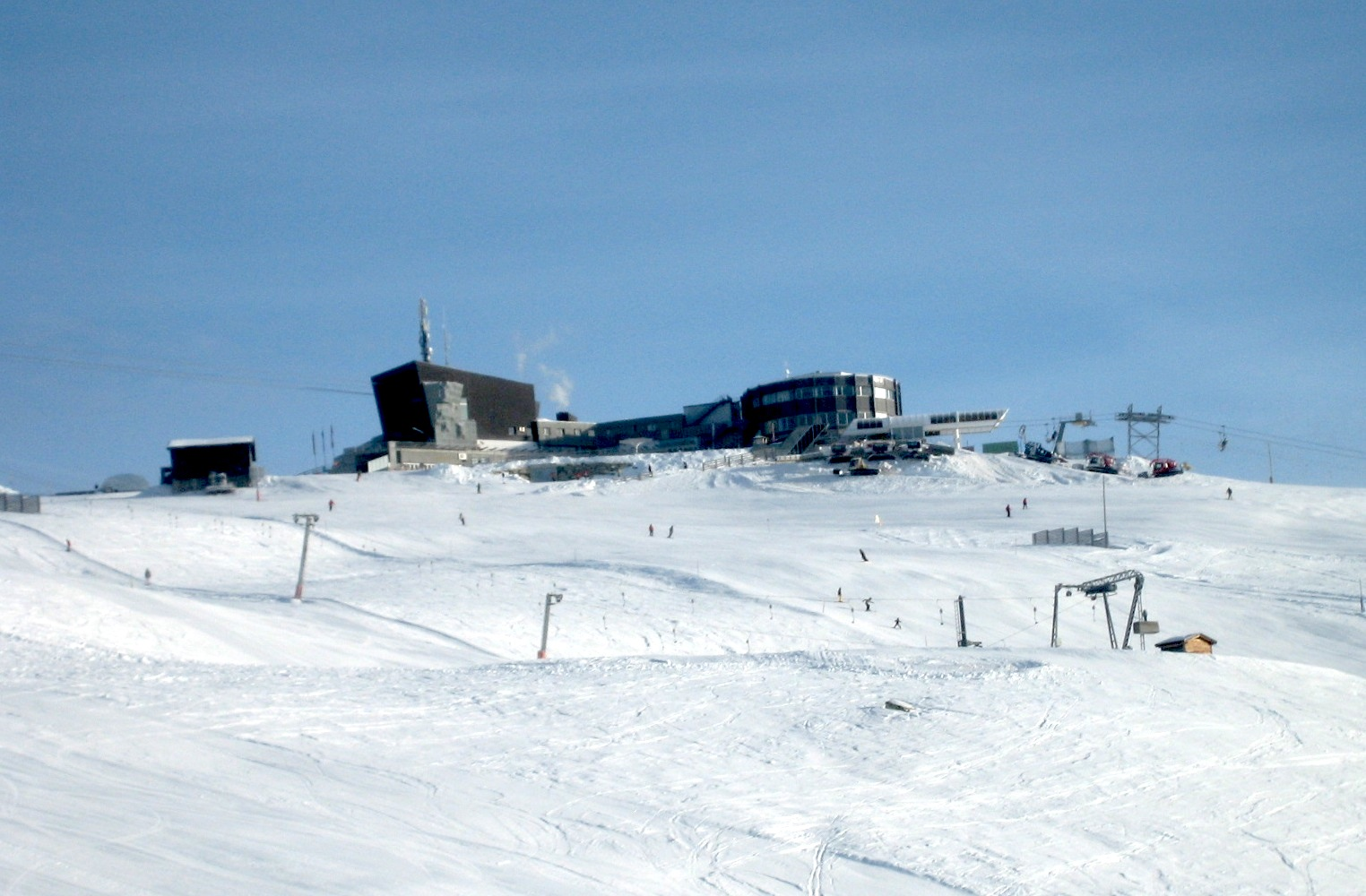
- Means of transport and Restaurant/Hotel (built in 1967) on Crap Sogn Gion

Highest point
- Elevation: 2,263 m (7,425 ft)
- Prominence: <30m
- Coordinates: 46°50′10″N 9°12′55″E

Geography
- Location within Switzerland
- Location: Graubünden, Switzerland
- Parent range: Glarus Alps

Climbing
- Easiest route: Aerial tramway

Crap Sogn Gion (meaning Saint John's stone in Romansh) is a mountain (2,263 metres (7,425 ft)) and cable car station (2,216 metres (7,270 ft)) located near Flims in the Swiss canton of Graubünden. Regarding the definition used in the Alps by the Swiss Alpine Club it cannot be called a mountain (nor even a peak with a strict definition) but only a location at the end of a ridge descending from the Vorab in the Glarus Alps.

As the location has no distinctive peak nor sudden drops in its gentle sides, it is absolutely not an impressive mountain but even more a very appropriate place to run a skiing resort. Comparing to other skiing resorts in Switzerland the missing neighbouring mountains to the south - which is the location of the giant prehistoric Flims Rockslide – make it even more exposed to the sun even at the sun's lowest orbit in deep winter.

A very small hut of the Ski Club Flims was the first building on Crap Sogn Gion, still standing there although hardly noticed. From 1962 the area was accessible by platter lift, followed 1967 by the then biggest aerial cable car with cabins to hold as much as 125 passengers, which is still in use today along with several modernised chairlifts.

A more recent aerial cable car was built to Crap Masegn, from where another gondola lift leads to the glacier at Vorab, which made the ski resort a safe one in regards of snow even in winters of poor snowfall.

For a walk in summer you may find Crap Sogn Gion on Swisstopo Map 1194, Flims, in the 1:25'000 scale. National Maps of Switzerland are a set of official map series designed, edited and distributed by Swisstopo, the Swiss Federal Office of Topography.

== Gallery ==
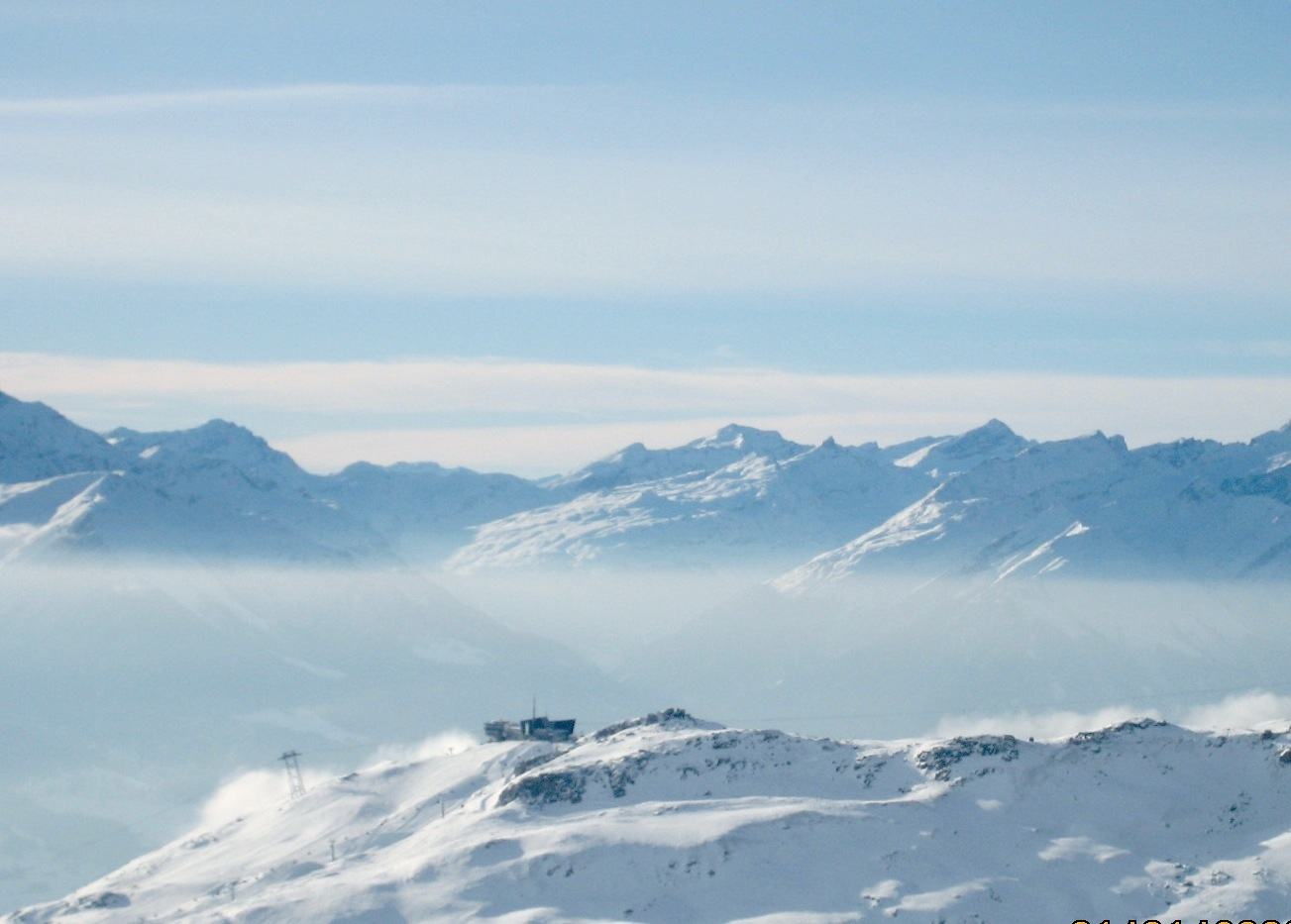
Crap Sogn Gion in the foreground

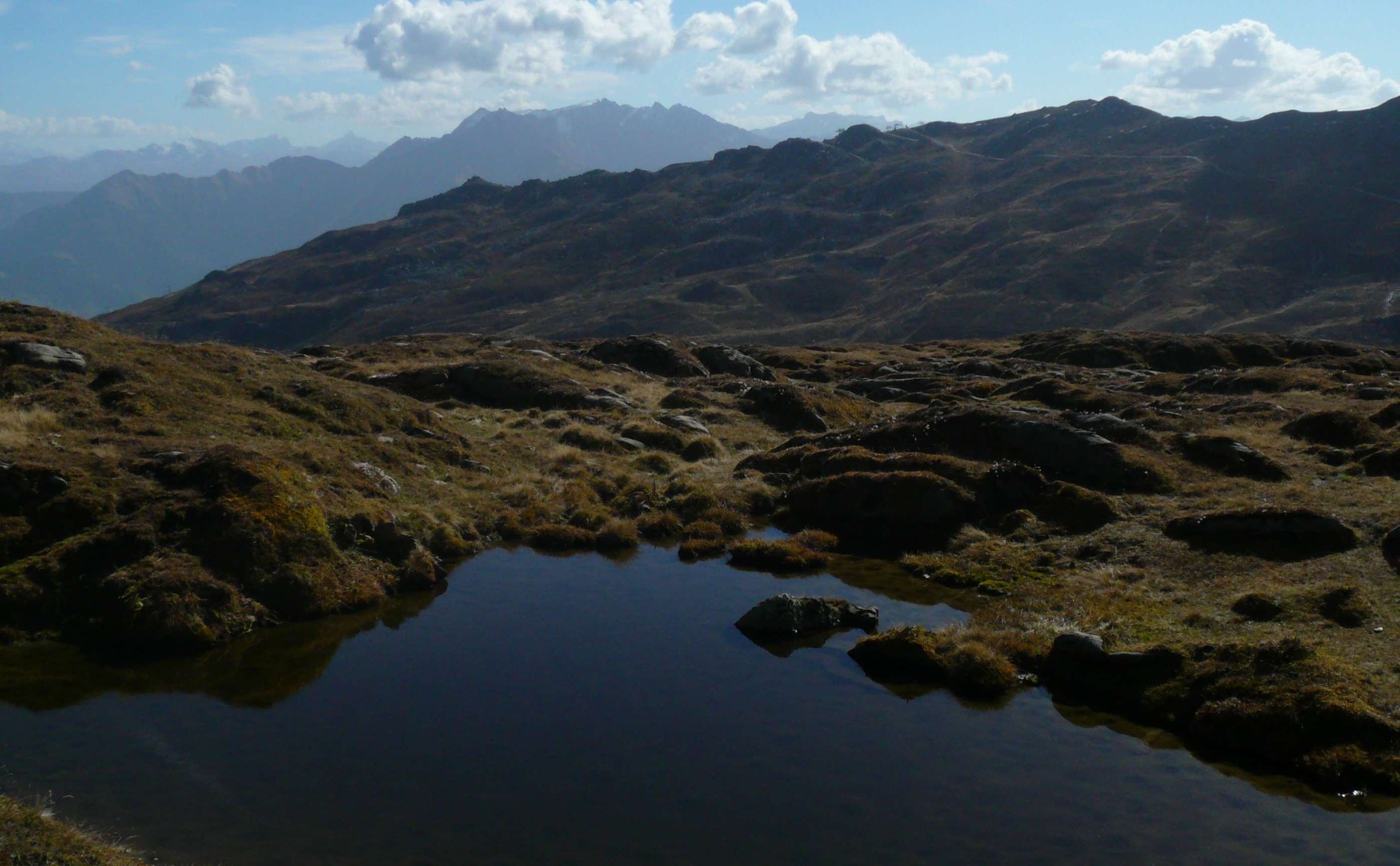
Character of Crap Sogn Gion, the tiny peak on the left of the ridge in the middle distance; it does not reach the criteria to be called a mountain nor a peak but it is beautiful to ski on.

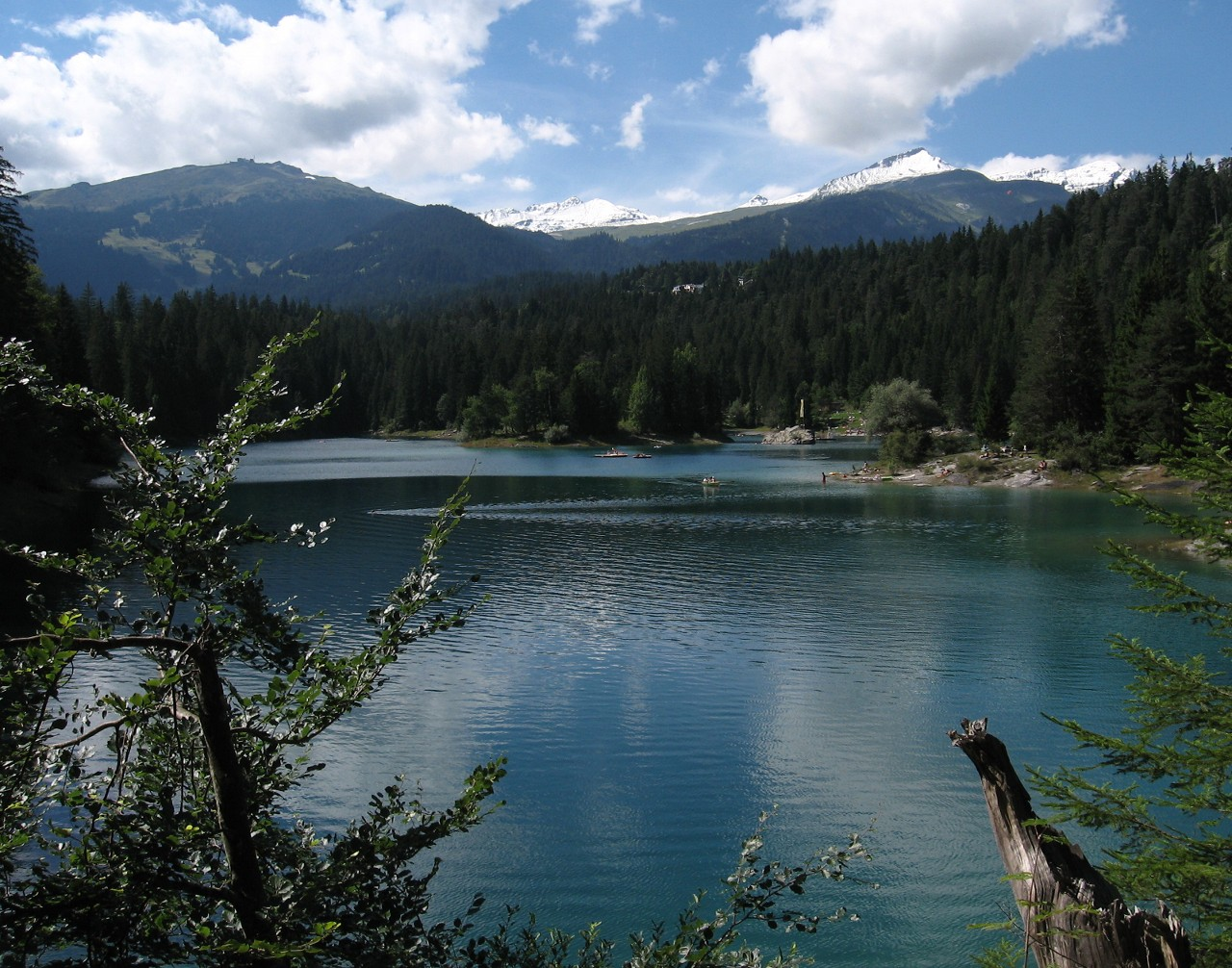
Caumasee in the Flims Forest in front, Crap Sogn Gion left and Vorab, the white mountain to its right. The white Triangel is Crap Ner and Ofen the white peak to its right (Glarus thrust)
