= Lag Prau Pulté =

Lake in the Grisons, Switzerland

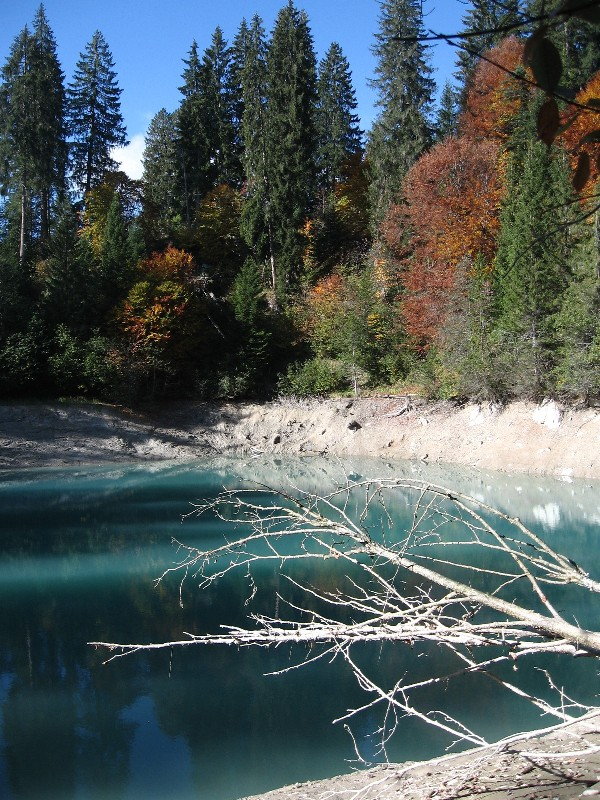
- Lag Prau Pulté half empty in October. It will be completely dry all winter, filling up again in May only.

- Location within Canton of Graubünden Location within Switzerland Location within Italy Location within Alps
- Interactive map of Lag Prau Pulté
- Location: Flims, Grisons
- Coordinates: 46.8266°N 9.27464°E
- Primary inflows: underground
- Primary outflows: nameless
- Basin countries: Switzerland
- Max. length: 100 m (330 ft)
- Max. width: 100 m (330 ft)
- Max. depth: 6 m (20 ft)
- Residence time: half year
- Surface elevation: 1,122 m (3,681 ft) above Sea
- Frozen: empty during winter
- Islands: none

Lag Prau Pulté is a lake at Flims in the canton of Grisons, Switzerland.

== Geography ==
This lake falls completely dry in autumn and remains empty until being filled by growing underground flows depending on temperatures and snow melt rate in the mountains. During a cold period in spring, water that entered the dell of this lake may disappear again as snow melt decreases and all water remains in the underground flow. As soon as the basin is finally filled, a small river of just about half a mile in length (falling some 100 meters in level) will start flowing around May. Its destination is another lake, Lag Tuleritg, which is fed by this river in spring, disappearing in autumn and staying dry all winter. Due to its origin the water of both lakes remains grey all summer until the level starts to go down in autumn. In Lag Prau Pulté one can see another special effect caused by air being forced out of the underground, causing the lake not only to remain grey but offering frequent bubbles on the surface.

Because its proximity it is very likely that the water from Lag Tuleritg continues underground to Caumasee, although no experiments using colour was ever to prove this.

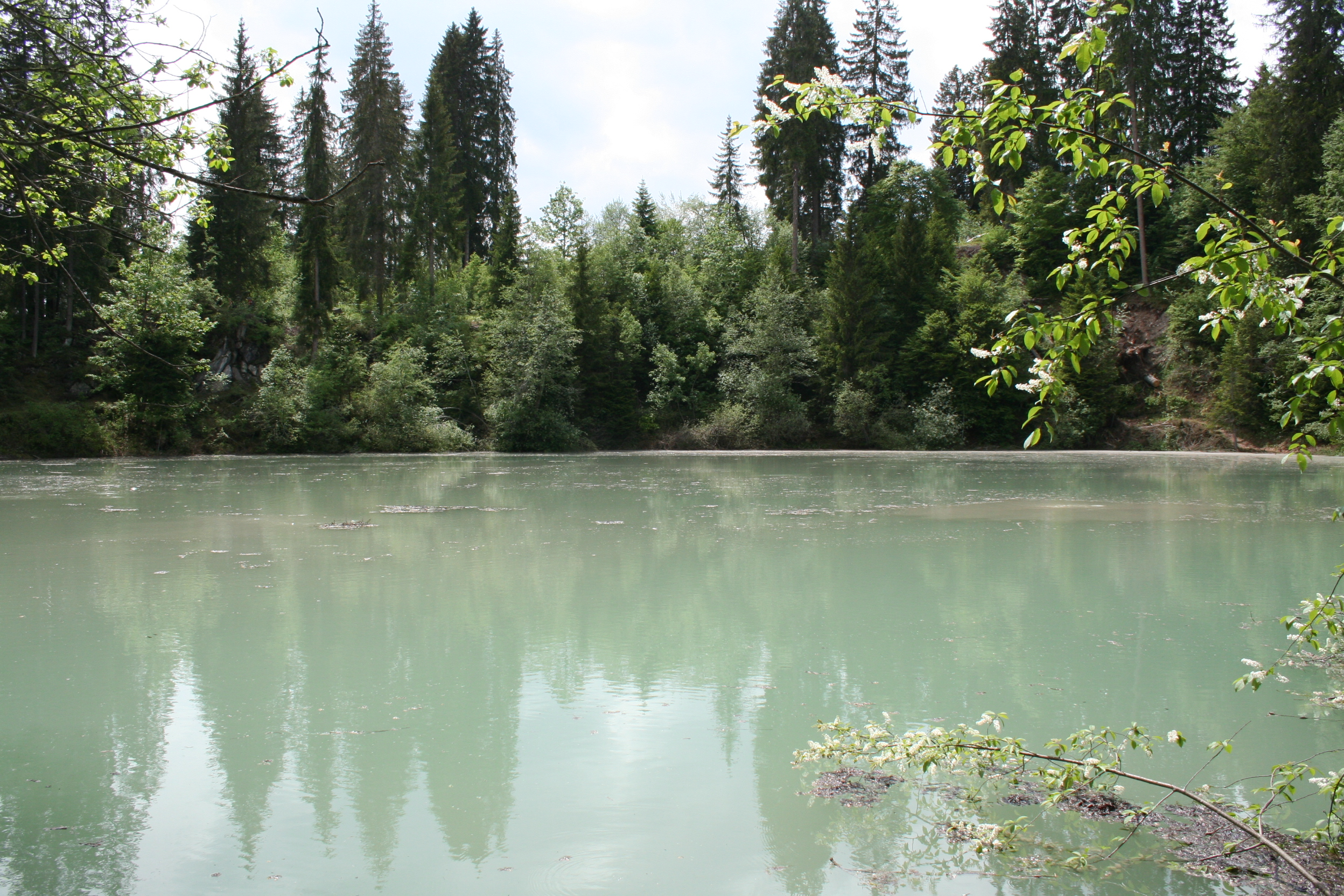
Lag Prau Pulté filled in summer

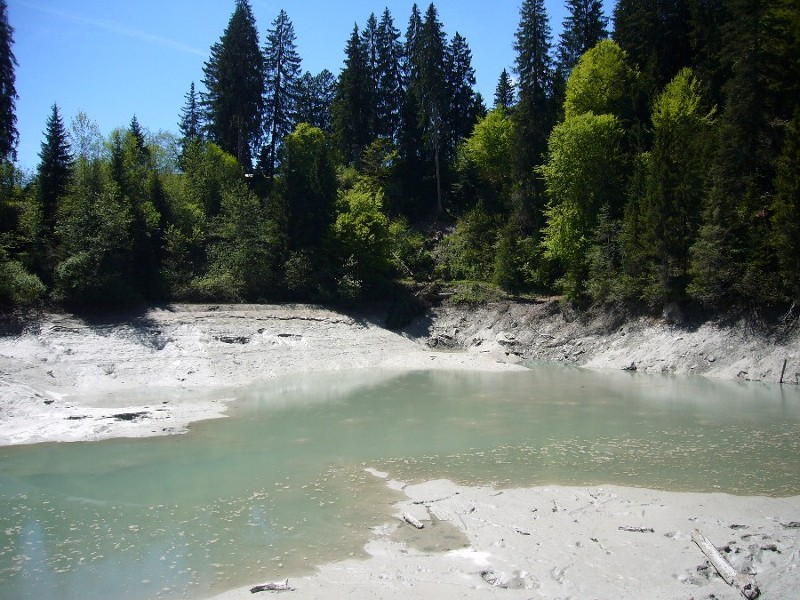
Lag Prau Pulté first water appears in May

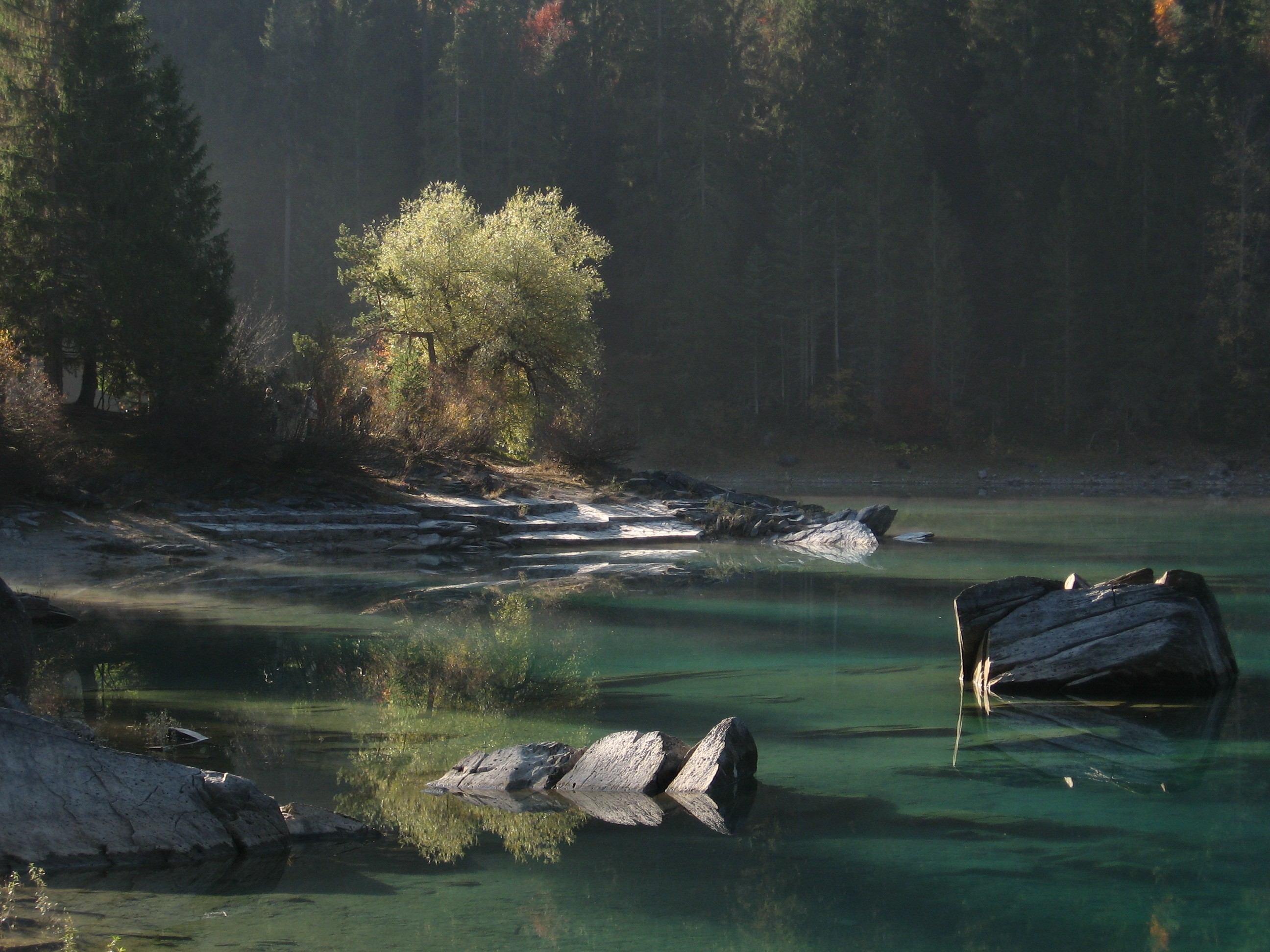
Caumasee, supposedly being fed by Lag Lag Prau Pulté via Lag Tuleritg and underground.

== Literature ==
- Hermann Anliker: Schweizer Heimatbücher: Flims; Haupt-Verlag, Bern 1961
- Sina Semadeni-Bezzola: Waldhaus Flims, Werner Classen-Verlag, Zürich 1976
- Emil Kirchen: Wenn der Berg stürzt: das Bergsturzgebiet zwischen Chur und Ilanz - Chur [etc.]: Terra Grischuna, cop. 1993. [000943845] ISBN 3-7298-1087-1
