= Rudolf Olgiati =

Swiss architect

Rudolf Olgiati (Chur, 7 September 1910 – Flims, 25 September 1995) was a Swiss architect. Olgiati is known for his work with Alfred Werner Maurer on the French Riviera, and has had some of his more notable work exhibited in the 1977 ETH Zürich.

== Biography ==
Olgiatis father was Oreste Olgiati; a lawyer and citizen of Poschiavo and Chur. In 1927, Olgiati graduated from the Grisons Canton School in Chur. He then studied at ETH Zurich, where he graduated in 1934, with Josef Zemp, in art history. Rudolf Olgiati worked as an architect, first in Zürich and starting in 1944 in Flims, where he had purchased a house back in 1930 and then proceeded to renovate it making it the family home. His son Valerio Olgiati is also active as an architect and lives in Flims in his father's house.

== Basic features of his work ==
Rudolf Olgiati was a representative of the New Objectivity movement and one of the first architects in the mid-1950s to discover the importance and effectiveness of historical design principles for the architecture of modernity. Olgiati mainly built family houses in the mountainous region of Grisons, Switzerland, and restored old farmhouses and patrician houses, later also designed buildings in southern France and Germany together with Alfred Werner Maurer.

Olgiati's cubical use of forms moved between the priorities of Grison's local architectural tradition, the ancient Greek style, and modernism mainly oriented on Le Corbusier. Thus, Olgiati was striving for a universal, timeless, and radically modern architecture, equally documenting the influence of international architecture as well as the indigenous Swiss architecture; thereby always remaining aware of its ideological and formal context. With Olgiati, who never considered the use of traditional elements as restorative, architecture is combined with local traditions and with the place as such, which he claimed to remodel by creating an intimate relationship between the architecture and the local residents.

Olgiati's work has been exhibited in 1977 at ETH Zürich, in 1986 at the Freie Akademie der Künste Hamburg, in 1986 at Technische Universität Berlin, and in 1988 at the Art University Linz, Austria. In 1981, Olgiati received the Cultural Prize of the Canton of Grisons.

== Works ==
- Casa Matta, Flims-Waldhaus 1955
- Apartment House Las Caglias, Flims-Waldhaus 1959-1960
- House B. Savoldelli (orig. D. Witzig), Flims-Waldhaus 1966
- House van der Ploeg Lavanuz, Laax 1966-1967
- House van Heusden Lavanuz, Laax 1967-1968
- House Dr. Allemann, Unterwasser Wildhaus, 1968-1969
- Residential development "Cittadeta" Savognin, competition 1971
- Multi-family house Casa Radulff, Flims-Waldhaus 1971-1972
- Apartment house "Amiez", remodeled factory to residential building, Flims-Dorf 1971-1977
- Handelsgärtnerei Urech, Chur 1972-1973
- House Rogosky, Mercantale, Tuscany, Italy, 1972-1973
- Apartments for elderly and small apartments "Candrian", Sagens, 1974
- Tschaler House, Chur 1974-1977
- House Dr. Schorta, Tamins 1975-1976
- House Weiss, Kaltenbach TG 1978-1979
- Villa Sarraz, Les Issambres, Côte d’Azur, France, 1986-1989, with A.W. Maurer
- House Casutt Ilanz 1984
- Casutt Hotel, remodeling of restaurant, Ilanz 1986
- House G. Rensch (orig. Dr. Thoma), Walenstadt 1988
- House Winterberg, Saarbrücken 1988-1989, with A.W. Maurer
- Renovation of house 'Schlössli' Morissen, 1989–1991
- Apartment house Bebié, Morissen, 1990
- House Dr. Bühlmann, Hilterfingen BE, 1993

== Projects ==
- School system "prism" Schamserberg, Donath competition 1976
- Redevelopment of downtown Chur 1980-1982
- Buendner Musée d'Art Chur, competition 1982
- Theater and museum, Flims-Dorf, competition 1987
- Annex, Tower Books and Art Gallery Saarbrücken 1988-1989, with A. W. Maurer
- Terrace House in Saarbrücken in 1988, with A. W. Maurer
- Cultural Center Yellow House Flims-Dorf, competition 1992-1994
- Tourist center valley, Flims-Dorf 1994
- Olgiati Musée, Flims-Waldhaus 1994, 1996

== Bibliography ==
- Josef Kremerskothen: Rudolf Olgiati. In: Grosse Architekten. Menschen, die Baugeschichte machten. 9. Auflage. Gruner und Jahr, Hamburg 1999, ISBN 3-570-06546-4, S. 231 ff.
- Thomas Boga (ed.): Die Architektur von Rudolf Olgiati. Ausstellung vom 16. Juni bis 7. Juli 1977 am Hönggerberg der ETH Zürich. 3. Auflage. Organisationsstelle für Architekturausstellungen, Zürich 1983, ISBN 3-85676-018-0.
- Ursula Riederer: Rudolf Olgiati: Bauen mit den Sinnen. HTW, Chur 2004, ISBN 3-9522147-0-1.
- Rudolf Olgiati: Eine Streitschrift. Magazin und Buch, Stuttgart 1994. ISBN 3-9803822-0-6.
- Hrsg. Selina Walder: Dado: Gebaut und bewohnt von Rudolf Olgiati und Valerio Olgiati. Birkhäuser Verlag, Basel 2010, ISBN 978-3-0346-0375-1.
- Thomas Boga (ed.): Rudolf Olgiati. Birkhäuser Verlag, Basel 2009 ISBN 303460310X
- Alfred Werner Maurer: Villa Sarraz Côte d'Azur France, Philologus Verlag Basel, 2013
