= Caumasee =

Lake in the Grisons, Switzerland

- Lag la Cauma
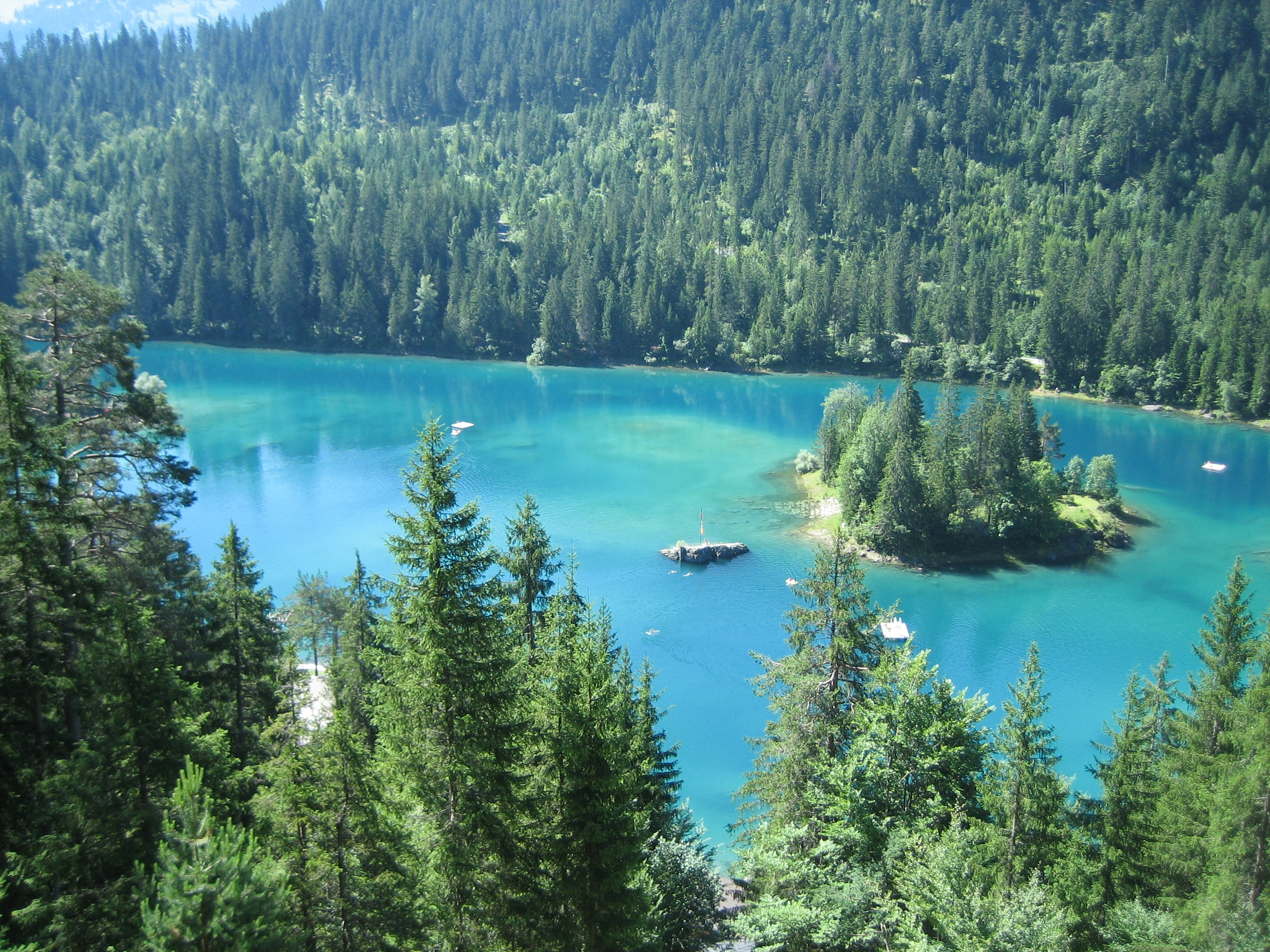
- summer 2008 at high level

- Location within Canton of Graubünden Location within Switzerland Location within Italy Location within Alps
- Interactive map of Caumasee
- Location: Grisons
- Coordinates: 46°49′13″N 9°17′45″E
- Primary inflows: underground
- Primary outflows: underground
- Basin countries: Switzerland
- Surface area: 10.3194 ha (25.500 acres)
- Max. depth: 30 m (98 ft)
- Water volume: 650 thousand cubic metres (23×10^{6} cu ft)
- Shore length^{1}: 2.105 km (1.308 mi)
- Surface elevation: 997 m (3,271 ft)
- References: Swisstopo
- ^{1} Shore length is not a well-defined measure.

Caumasee (Romansh: Lag la Cauma or Lai da Cauma) is a lake near Flims, in the Grisons, Switzerland. It is one of the lakes on the Flims Rockslide deposits. The lake is fed from underground sources. Its surface area is 10.3194 ha.

The lake level varies by approximately 4 to 5 meters, depending on underground water flow throughout the year; it reaches its minimum by the end of April, when snowmelt in the mountains increases. A maximum level is reached by mid July, but may be topped in August, even after a previous fall due to summer rain. The very western bay never freezes in winter, probably showing a maximum water flow in this area.

When the lake is at a low level, with a small volume of water, it warms up sooner than most lakes in the region, so people can be seen swimming in the lake in April, while bigger lakes, even in lower areas of Switzerland, remain relatively calm—water temperature in summer averages 21 Celsius, with a maximum around 24 Celsius.

The lake is in a vast forest that was left to remain on the agriculturally useless debris from the most significant prehistoric rockslide in the Alps. It can only be reached by a footpath (wheelchair accessible), possibly using Caumasee-Lift, a funicular built in 1939, refurbished in 1988 on its original tracks (running May to October only). The walk from the edge of town to the funicular takes about 10 minutes.

== Flow system ==
As close as 500 yards to the Caumasee is another dell and an alpine lake, called Lag Tuleritg, which is just about level to the Caumasee; it is just 18 meters higher. This lake dries out completely in autumn and remains empty until it is filled by a small river about 800m long, covering a difference in altitude of about 100 meters. That river will start flowing around May, depending on mountain temperatures and snowmelt rates. Its origin is another lake, Lag Prau Pulté, which is fed by underground water only in spring, disappearing in autumn and staying dry all winter. During a cold spring, water that entered the basin of this lake may disappear again as snowmelt decreases and all the water remains underground. Due to its origin, the water in both lakes is grey all summer until the levels start to drop in autumn. In Lag Prau Pulte, one can see another special effect caused by air being forced out of the underground; this keeps the lake not only grey but also bubbling, so different colours can be seen on the surface.

The flow system has been severely affected by the construction of the Flims Bypass Tunnel, when engineers decided to divert some 800 Litres per minute of underground water flow out of the tunnel rather than seal it into the rock. Further changes occurred when another previously existing basin near the road, which filled with water every year, was landfilled during road construction. Since 2011, additional water has been fed into the river running from Lag Prau Pulte to Lag Tuleritg to compensate for water loss in the underground system.

A fourth lake, Crestasee, is also fed by underground water but maintains a constant level year-round.

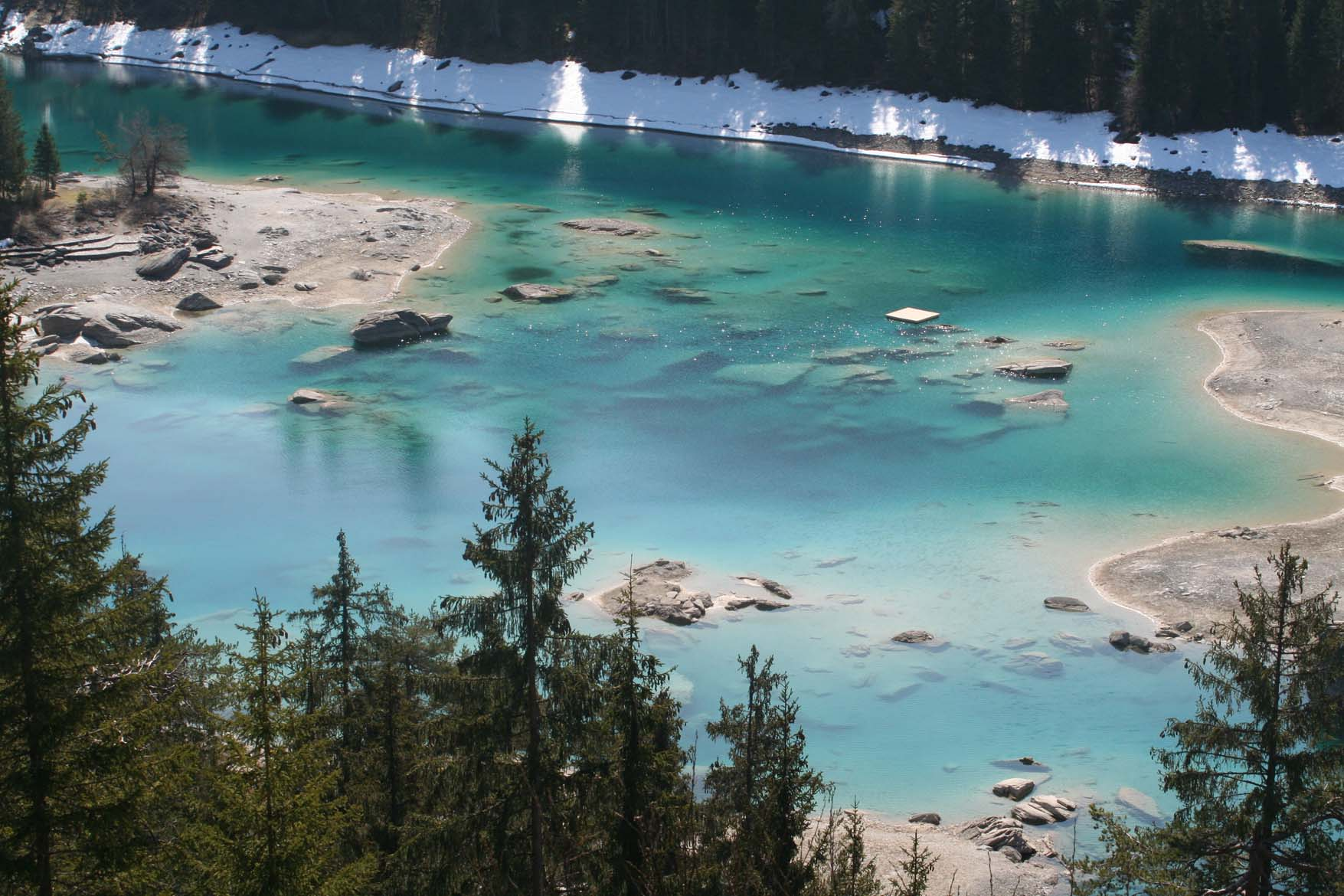
low water level in April 2007

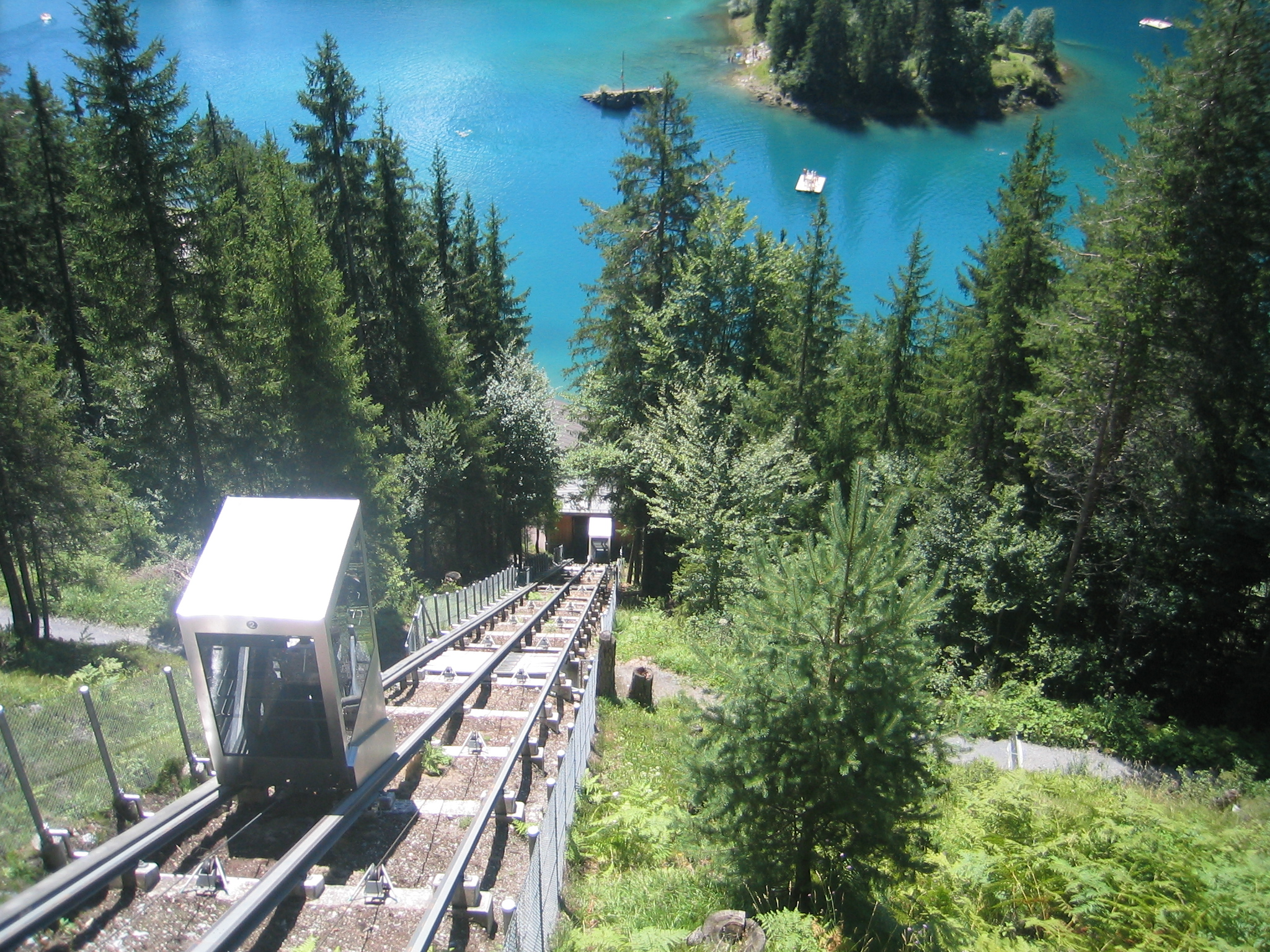
Caumasee-Lift from Flims

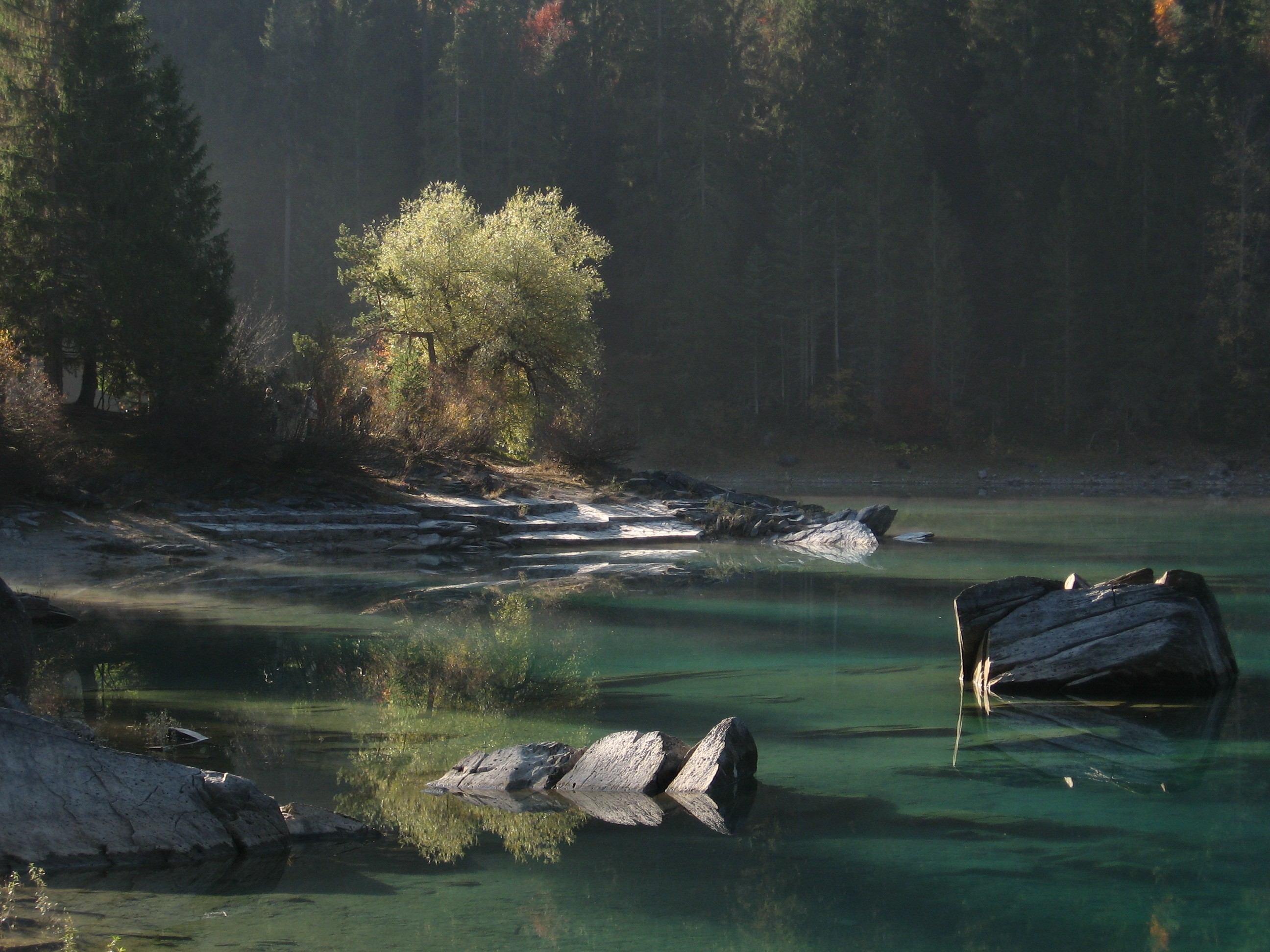
Caumasee eastern bay in autumn

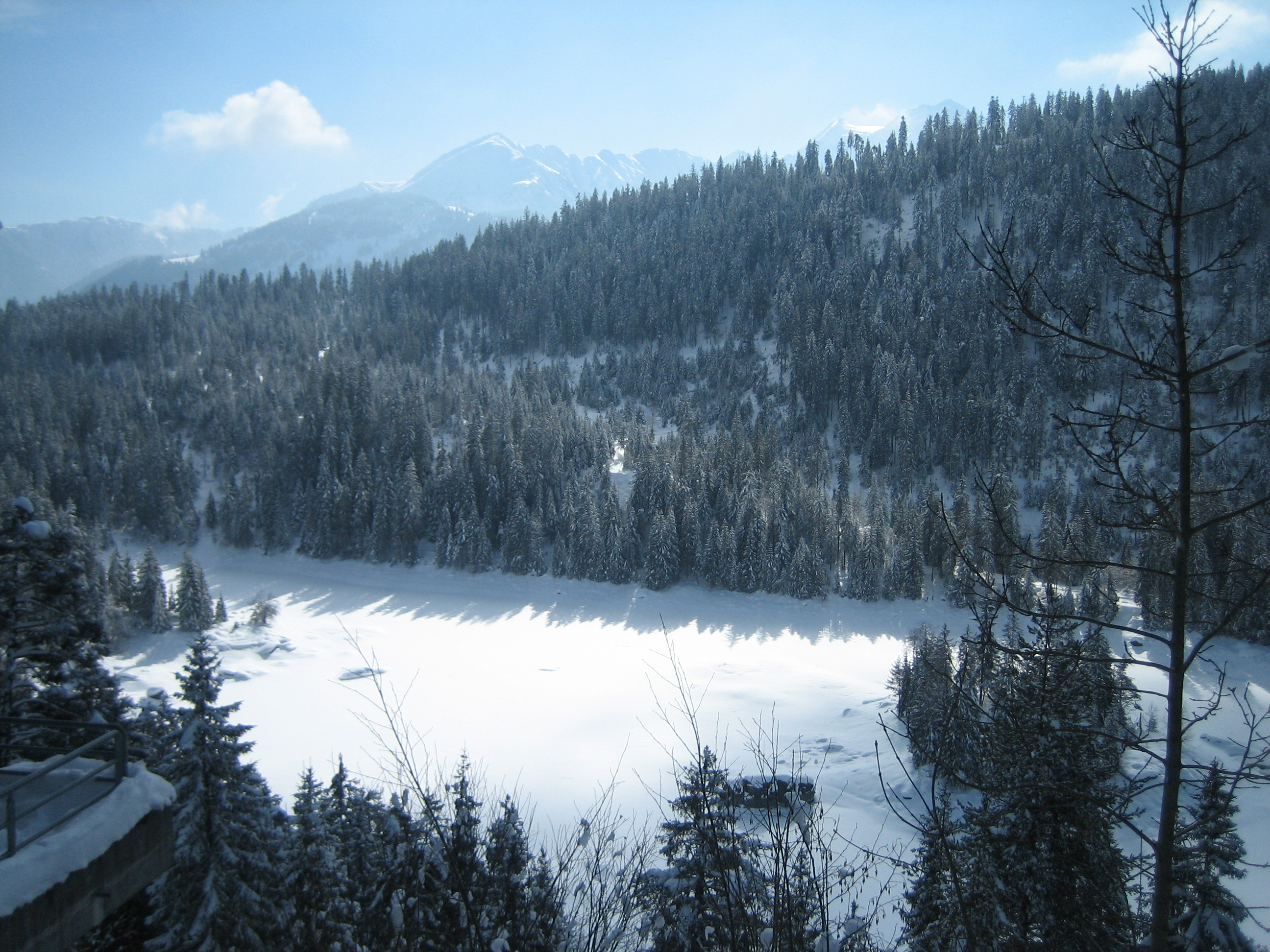
Frozen lake in February

== See also ==
- List of mountain lakes of Switzerland
