= Flims =

- Municipality
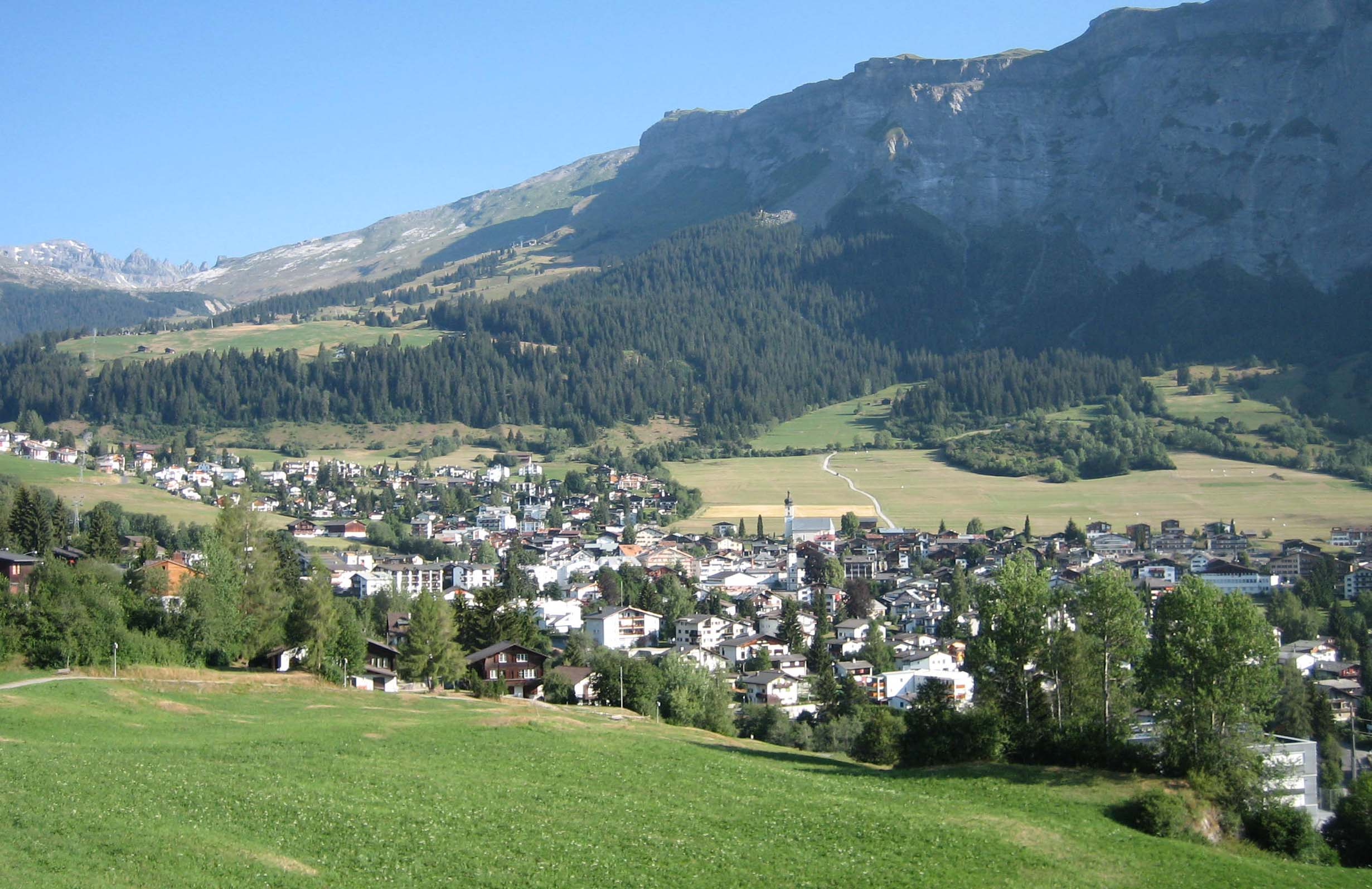
- Flims Dorf under "Flimserstein"

- Flag Coat of arms
- Location of Flims
- Location within Switzerland Location within Canton of Grisons
- Coordinates: 46°50′12″N 9°17′5″E
- Country: Switzerland
- Canton: Grisons
- District: Imboden

Area
  - Total: 50.46 km^{2} (19.48 sq mi)
- Elevation: 1,081 m (3,547 ft)

Population (December 2020)
  - Total: 2,915
  - Density: 57.77/km^{2} (149.6/sq mi)
- Time zone: UTC+01:00 (CET)
  - Summer (DST): UTC+02:00 (CEST)
- Postal code: 7017-7019
- SFOS number: 3732
- ISO 3166 code: CH-GR
- Surrounded by: Glarus Süd (GL), Laax, Pfäfers (SG), Sagogn, Trin, Valendas, Versam
- Website: gemeindeflims.ch

Flims (Romansh: Flem) is a municipality in the Imboden Region in the Swiss canton of the Grisons. The town of Flims is dominated by Flimserstein mountain, which can be seen from most of the municipality.

Flims consists of the village of Flims (called Flims Dorf) and the hamlets of Fidaz and Scheia as well as Flims-Waldhaus, the initial birthplace of tourism in Flims, where most of the hotels were built before and after around 1900.

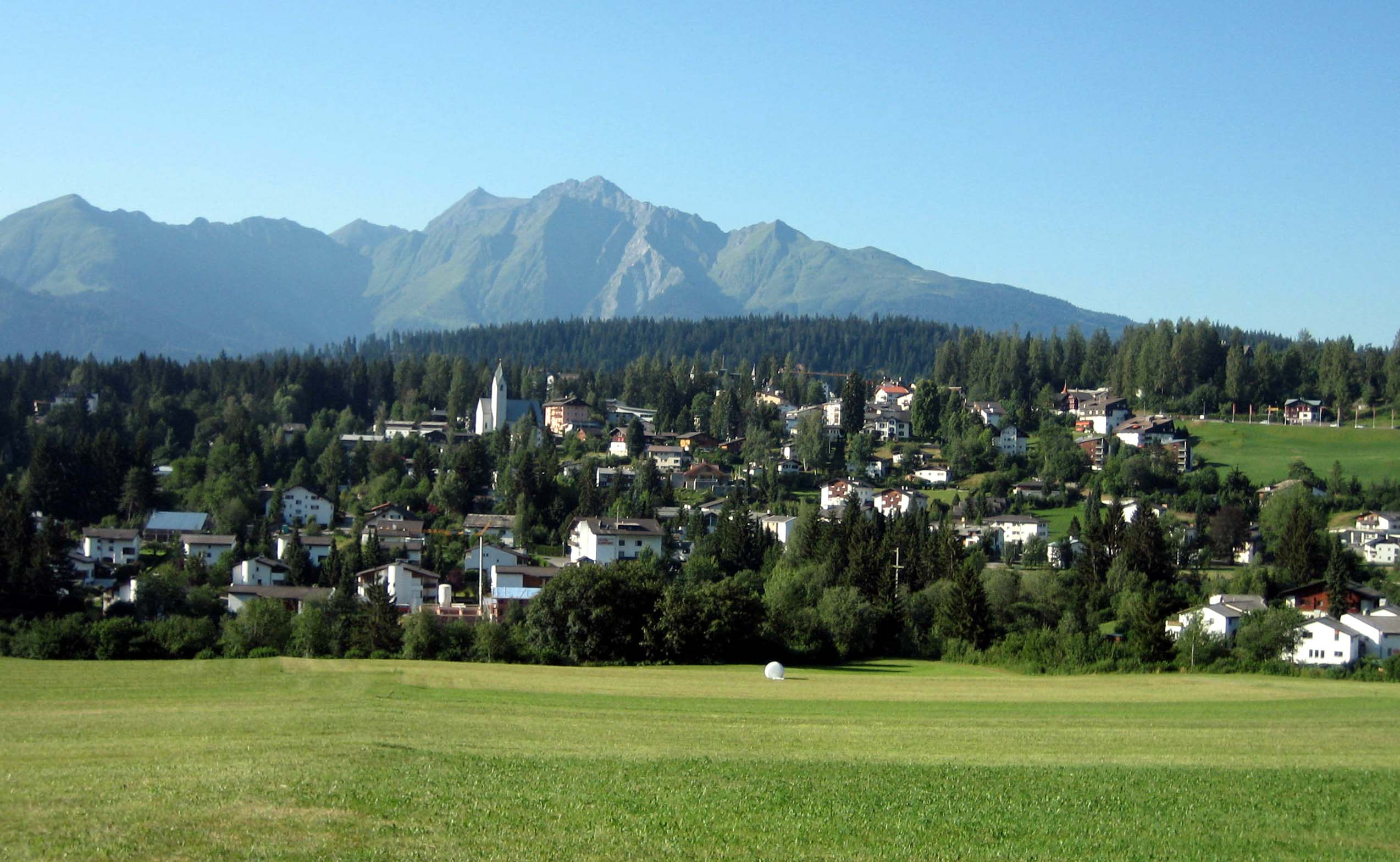
A wide view of Flims Waldhaus

== Geography ==
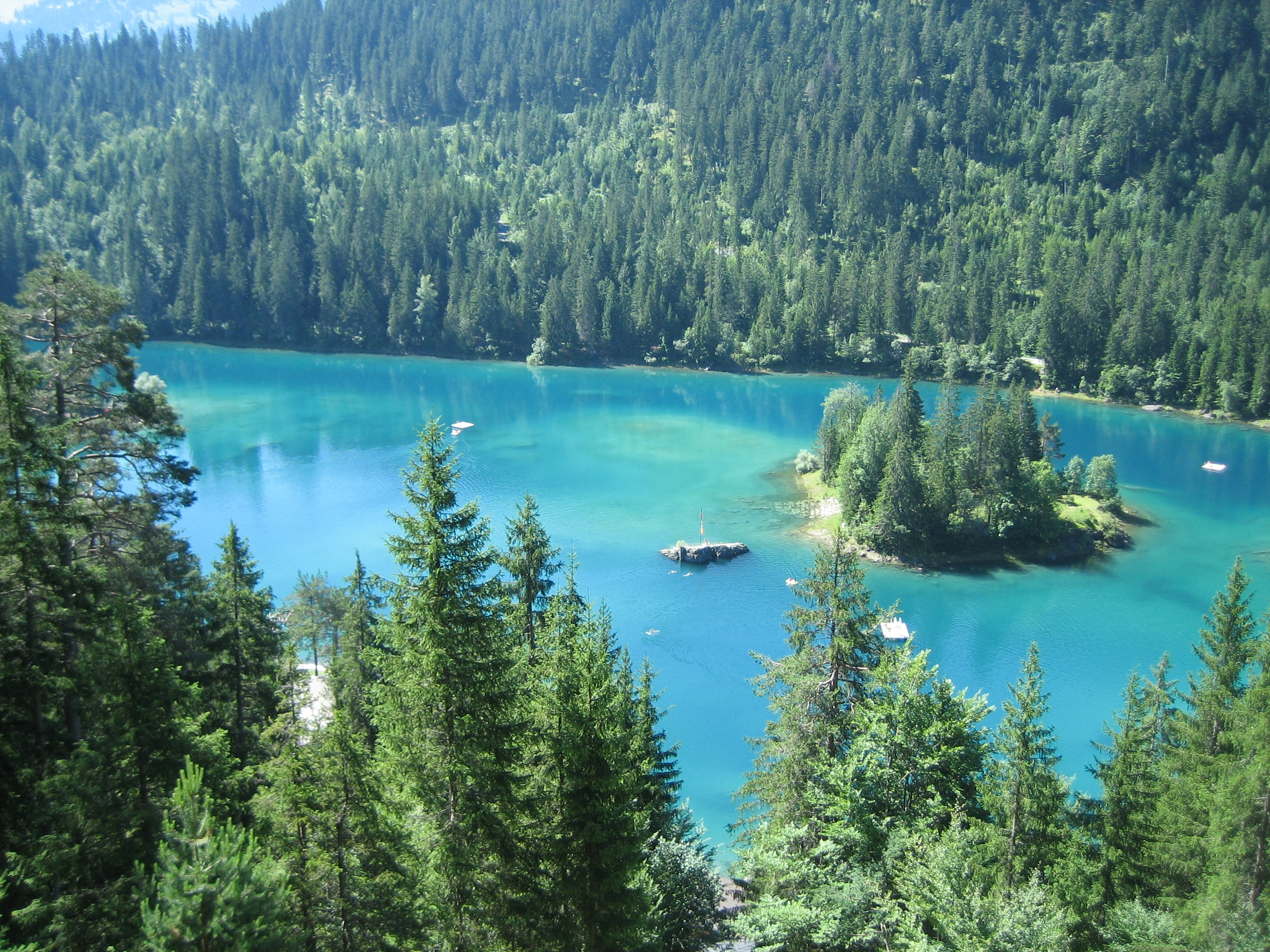
Caumasee

Flims has an area of 50.5 km^{2} (19.5 sq mi). Of this area, 33.7% is used for agricultural purposes, while 28.9% is forested. Of the rest of the land, 3.6% is settled (buildings or roads) and the remainder (33.9%) is non-productive (rivers, glaciers or mountains).

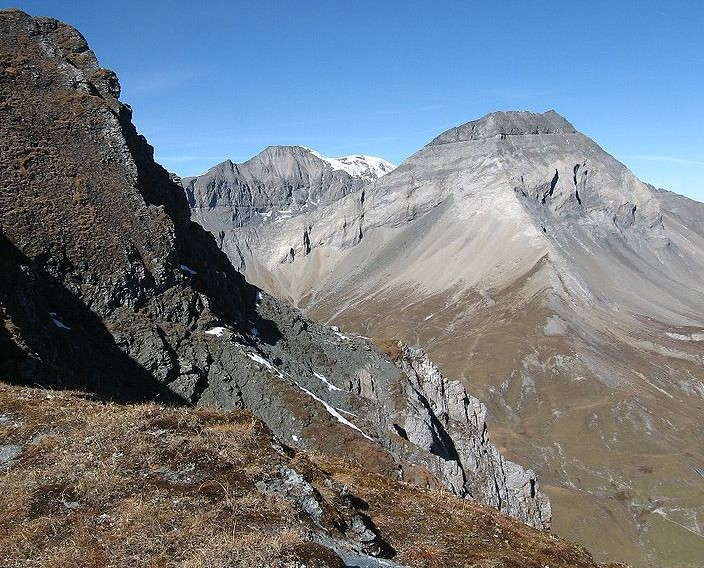
Glarus Thrust world heritage at Piz Dolf and Piz Segnas

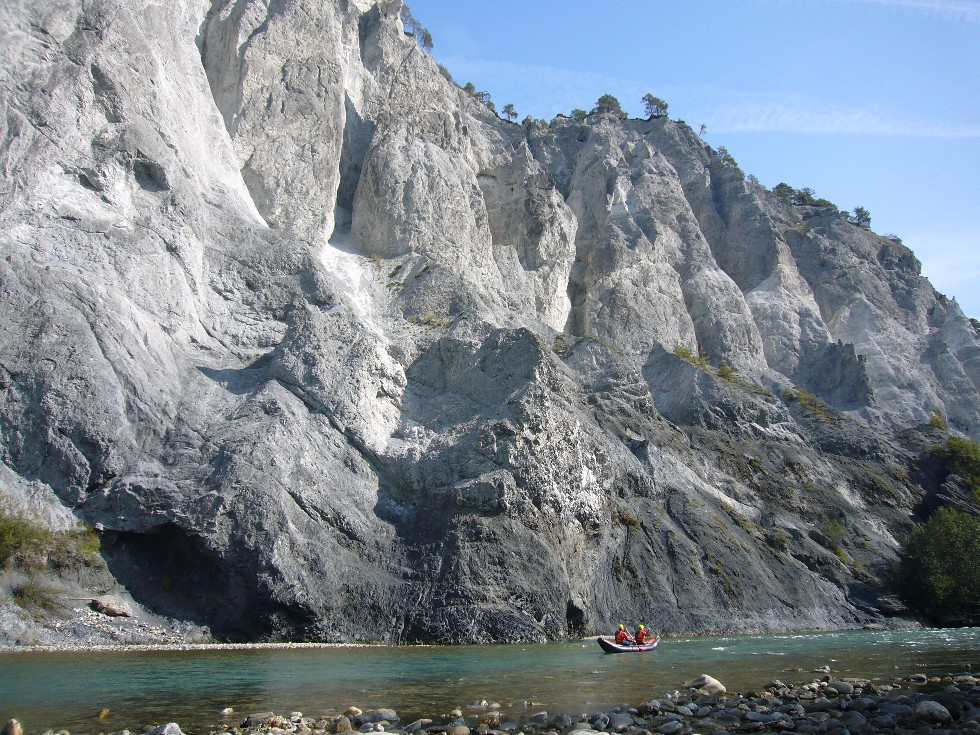
Rhine cutting through Flims Rockslide debris

Before 2017, the municipality was located in the Trin sub-district, of the Imboden district, after 2017 it was part of the Imboden Region. Flims is located on a terrace north of the Rhine valley, forming the Ruinaulta gorge here. The country-side has numerous streams and lakes north of the village, from which the name derives; "fluminae" in Latin means "many streams". The main river is called Flem while Caumasee and Crestasee to the south of the town do not have tributaries for lying in the debris area of prehistoric Flims Rockslide, where the landscape is very rough and completely forested as there was no agriculture possible ever.

The lowest point of the municipality is at the Rhine river in the Ruinaulta at 630 meters, while Piz Segnas reaches 3099 m. Both Piz Segnas and neighbouring Piz Dolf show the line of the Glarus thrust in its upper part, now a UNESCO World Heritage Site. The easiest access to the area is an aerial cableway to Fil de Cassons from Flims or any of various hikes to this ridge lying southeast of Piz Dolf. One route uses the ascent via Val Bargis, a wild valley running around Flimserstein.

== History ==
Aerial view from 400 m by Walter Mittelholzer (1923)

Flims is first mentioned in 765 as Fleme.

Into the 1990s, Flims dairymen delivered their milk to a dairy store in town from which villagers collected their raw or pasteurized milk daily. The location of the store is now being used as tourist information centre and the milk is being treated elsewhere. The small, quiet village was traditionally a winter home for dairymen whose animals grazed on the lush green slopes of summer. Cabins reminiscent of Heidi still dot the hillsides and ski slopes of Weisse Arena. The dairymen's winter homes are easily identified by their structure which includes stalls on ground level, home on upper level. The style allowed for rising heat from the animals to help heat the home during bitter winter months.

In 1877, in the Belle Époque, the first hotel for recreation opened, the Park Hotel. The hotel also took over the lake Caumasee and built swimming baths. In 1940 the first purpose-built holiday homes were built, nowadays more than half of all flats and homes are being used for recreation purposes.

Ancient Flims was populated since the Bronze Age, the remains of a medieval castle (Burg Belmont) can be reached by foot from the end of the public road at Fidaz within 40 minutes.

== Climate ==
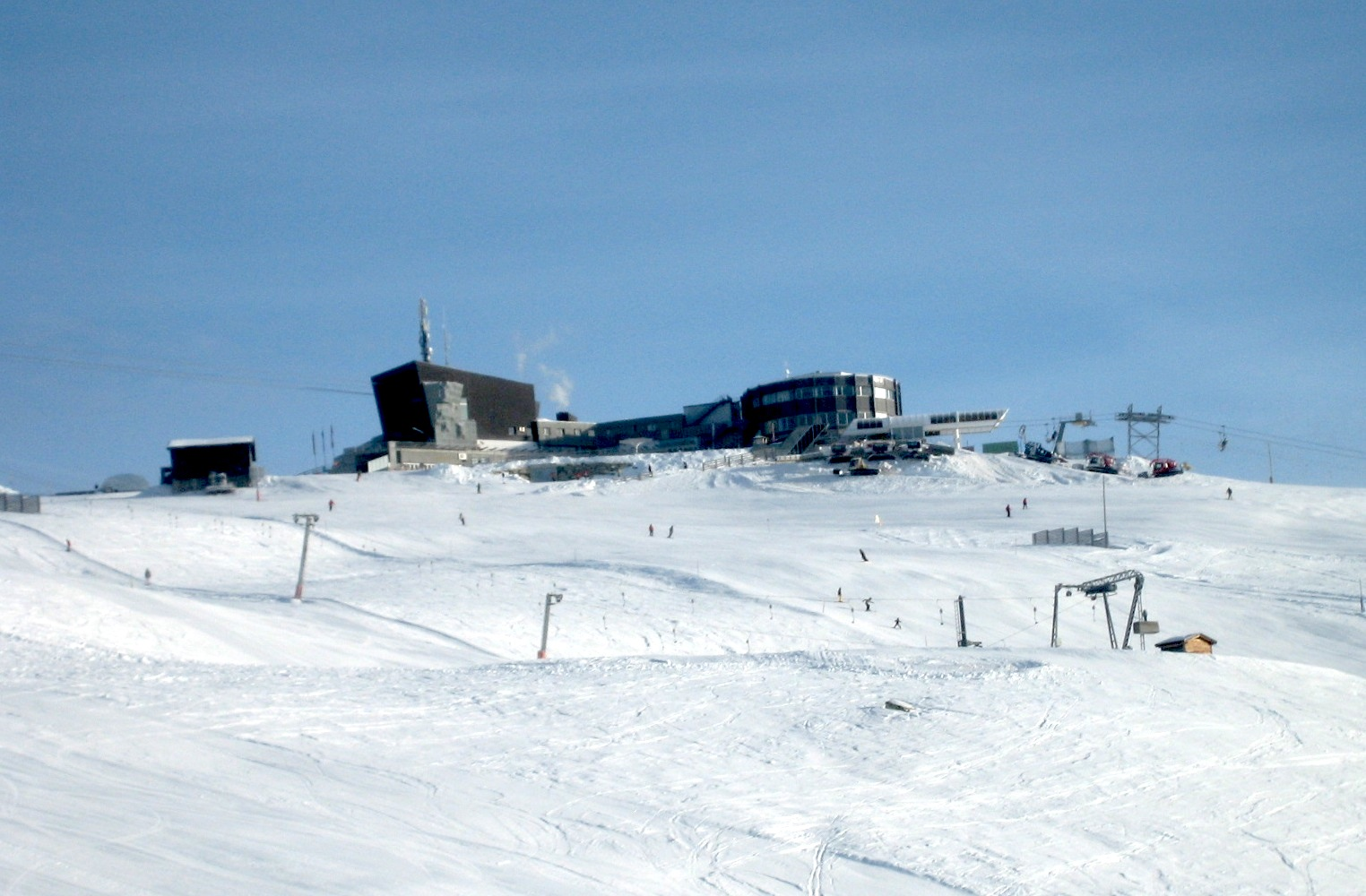
Crap Sogn Gion

The Swiss climate is generally temperate, with a peak of precipitation in summer. The wettest month is August during which time Flims receives an average of 128 mm (5.0 in) of precipitation falling for an average of 12.8 days. The driest month of the year is October with an average of 82 mm (3.2 in) of precipitation over 12.8 days. From October to March a lot of Switzerland suffers from fog, which does not reach Flims normally. During this period weather can remain stable for weeks and temperatures are often inverted, which means that modestly higher areas such as Flims are actually warmer than lower lying areas.

== Sports ==
Originally growing as a summer spa town in a distinctly wind sheltered and wide open area, especially since the building of big Hotels from 1877 on, it is nowadays also famous for winter sports (mainly skiing and snowboarding) and is now part of the Weisse Arena resort which combines the formerly separate resorts of Flims, Laax and Falera. It is regular host to international competitions such as the FIS World Championship in skiing and the Burton European Open in snowboarding. In 2004 the resort was featured in the popular Xbox snowboarding video game, Amped 2, and then in 2005 in the sequel Amped 3 on the Xbox 360. Due to the easy access the Weisse Arena cable-cars provide to the mountains, the town has become a popular winter and summer tourist locale.

Today Flims is a year-round resort known for winter sports of snowboarding, cross country skiing, downhill skiing and sledding, but also summer sports including hiking, rock climbing, paragliding, mountain biking and swimming in Caumasee, a spring-fed. The area of Conn is a viewpoint overlooking Ruinaulta (Rhine gorge), a rafting and canoeing aera. There are annual figure skating camps run by Viktor Kudriavtsev and Marina Kudriatseva. Skaters who have been regulars at the camps include Swiss national team members Jamal Othman, Sarah Meier, and Stéphane Lambiel, and international skaters Evan Lysacek, Gregor Urbas, Karel Zelenka, Kiira Korpi, and Ari-Pekka Nurmenkari.

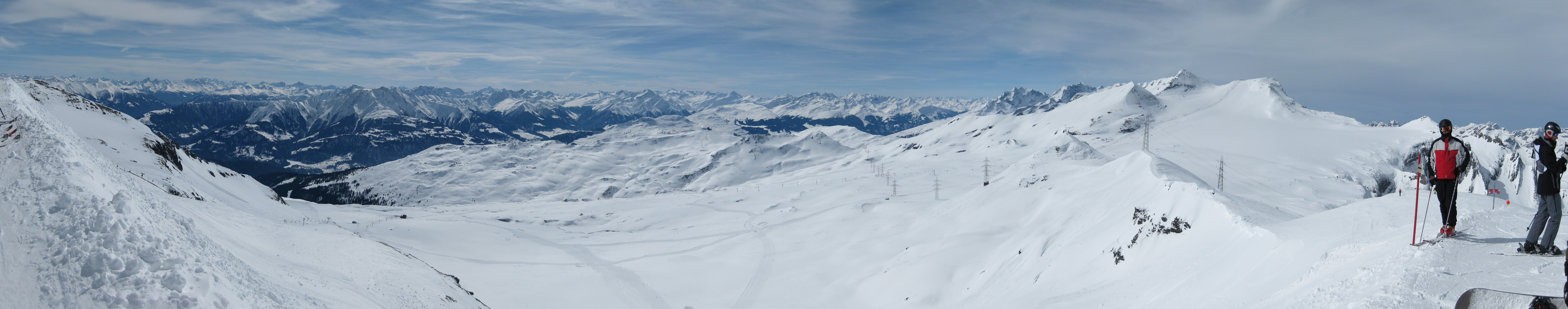
Skiing area

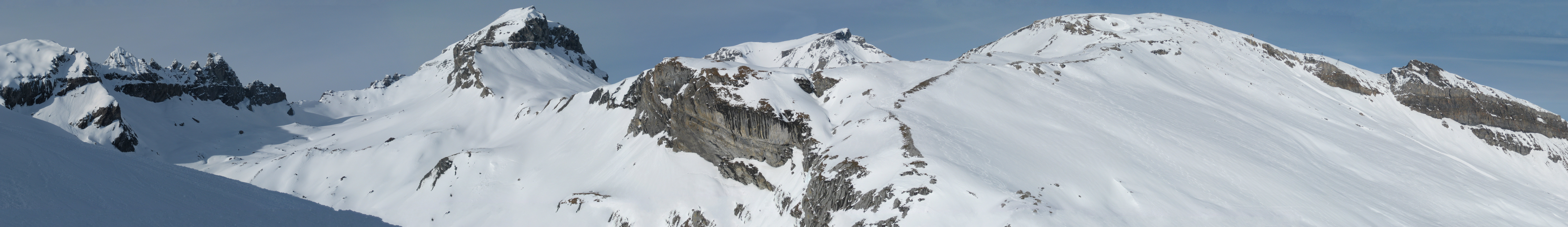
Flims mountains from left: 7 peaks of "Tschingelhörner", Piz Segnas (highest on horizon), Piz Dolf and Fil de Cassons

== Heritage sites of national significance ==
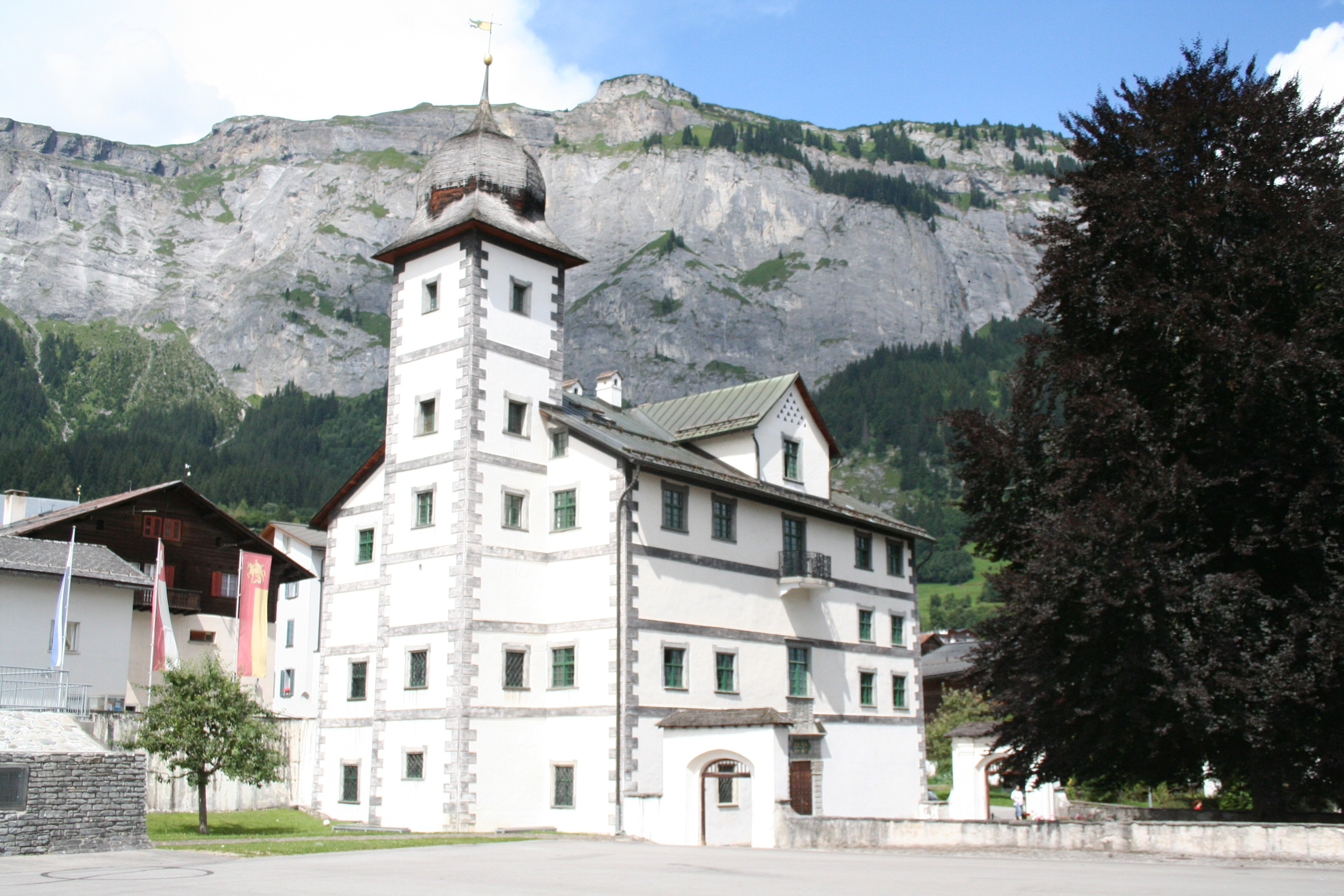
Schlössli or Rathaus (town council building) in Flims

The Schlössli in Flims is listed as a Swiss heritage site of national significance. The mountains north of Flims are listed as a UNESCO World Heritage Site for their visibility of tectonic activity.

== Demographics ==
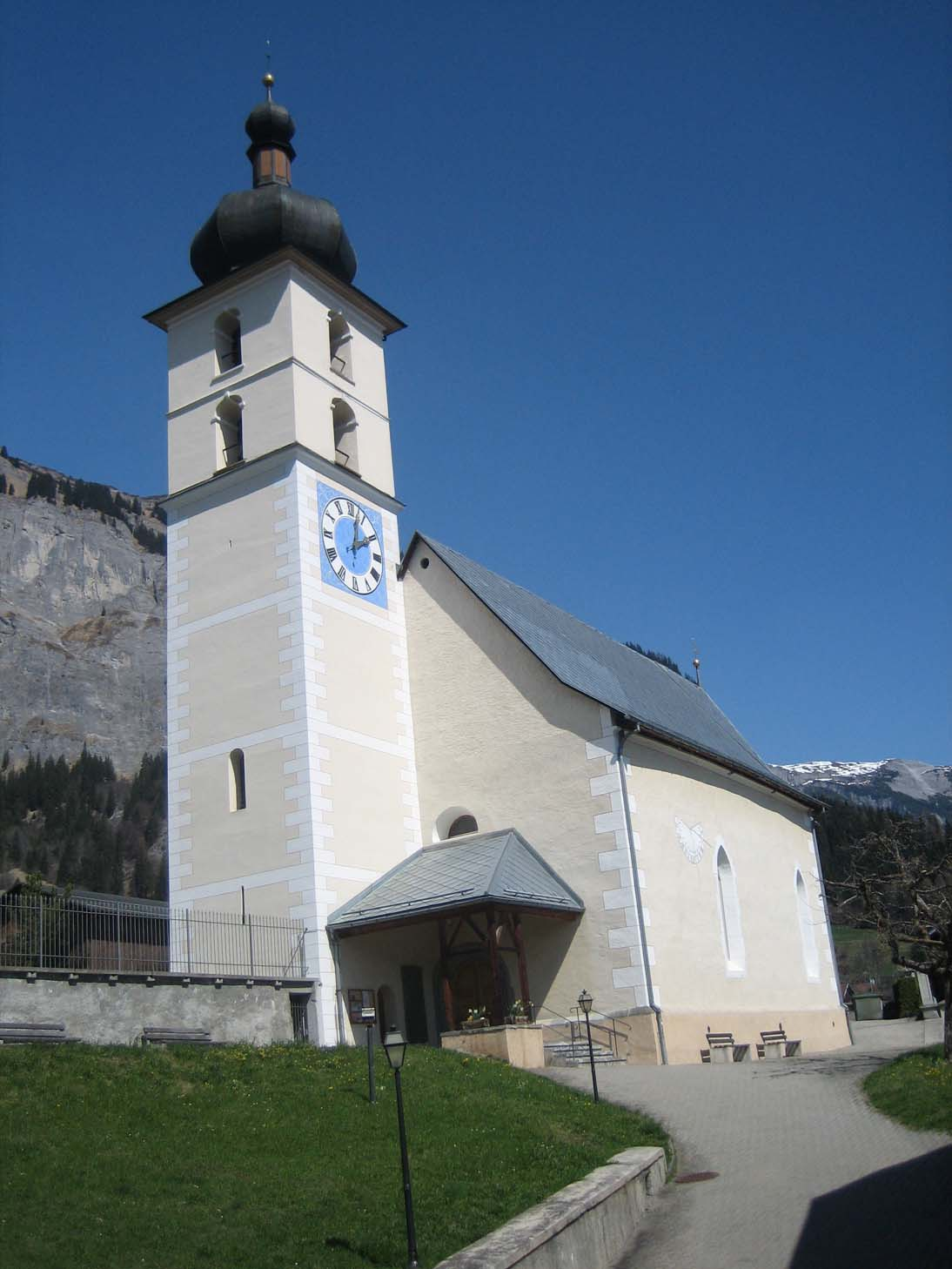
Flims Swiss Reformed Church

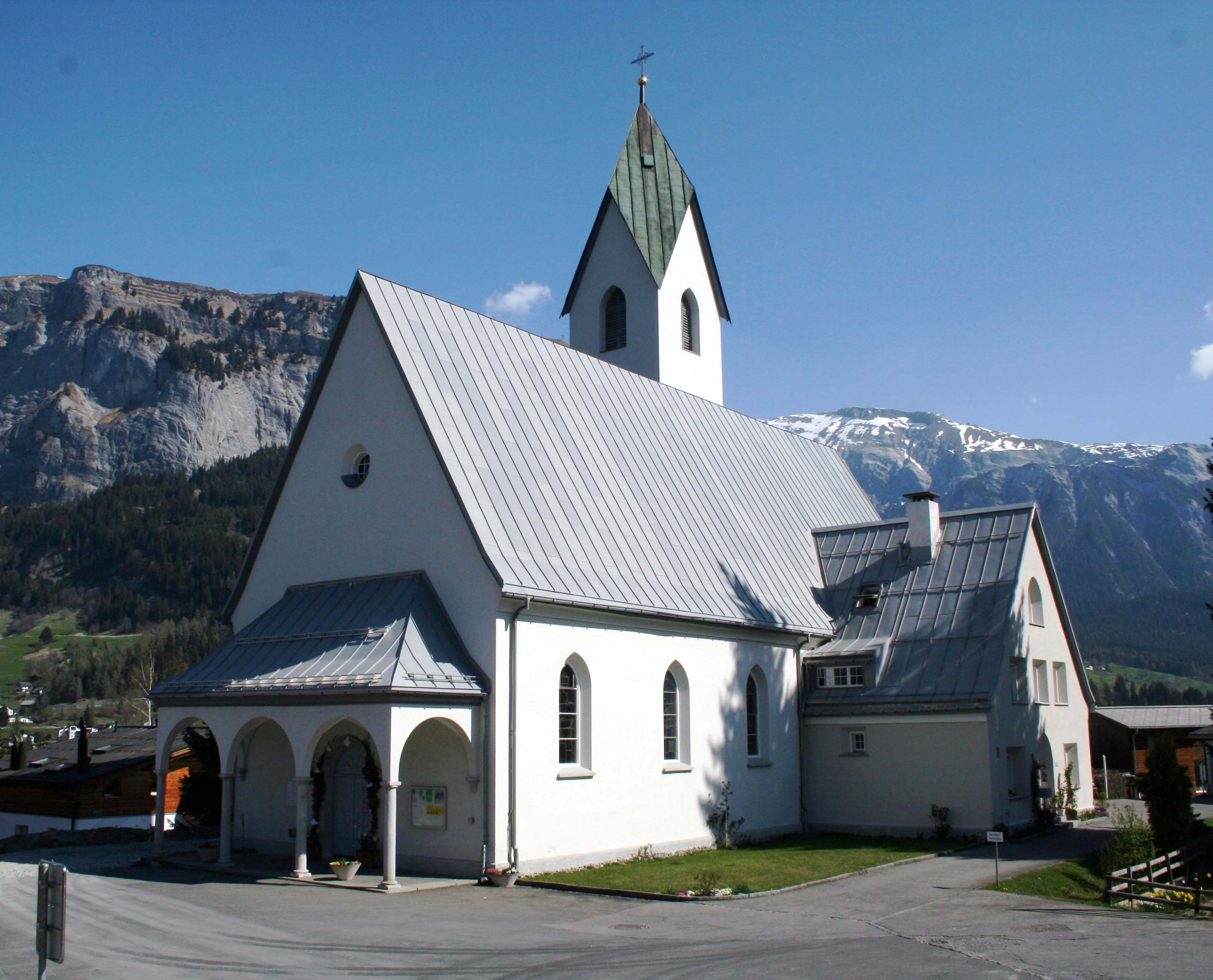
Flims Catholic Church

Flims has a population (as of 31 December 2020) of 2,915. As of 2008, 19.0% of the population was made up of foreign nationals. Over the last 10 years the population has grown at a rate of 8%.

As of 2000, the gender distribution of the population was 50.1% male and 49.9% female. The age distribution, as of 2000, in Flims is; 219 people or 8.6% of the population are between 0 and 9 years old. 138 people or 5.4% are 10 to 14, and 184 people or 7.2% are 15 to 19. Of the adult population, 371 people or 14.6% of the population are between 20 and 29 years old. 443 people or 17.4% are 30 to 39, 354 people or 13.9% are 40 to 49, and 338 people or 13.3% are 50 to 59. The senior population distribution is 245 people or 9.6% of the population are between 60 and 69 years old, 147 people or 5.8% are 70 to 79, there are 90 people or 3.5% who are 80 to 89, and there are 20 people or 0.8% who are 90 to 99.

In the 2007 federal election the most popular party was the SVP which received 33.4% of the vote. The next three most popular parties were the FDP (32.8%), the SPS (20.2%) and the CVP (12.3%).

The entire Swiss population is generally well educated. In Flims about 71.3% of the population (between age 25–64) have completed either non-mandatory upper secondary education or additional higher education (either university or a Fachhochschule).

Flims has an unemployment rate of 2.25%. As of 2005, there were 73 people employed in the primary economic sector and about 27 businesses involved in this sector. 205 people are employed in the secondary sector and there are 33 businesses in this sector. 1,156 people are employed in the tertiary sector, with 179 businesses in this sector.

From the 2000 census, 932 or 36.6% are Roman Catholic, while 1,239 or 48.6% belonged to the Swiss Reformed Church. Of the rest of the population, there are 63 individuals (or about 2.47% of the population) who belong to the Orthodox Church, and there are 7 individuals (or about 0.27% of the population) who belong to another Christian church. There are 35 (or about 1.37% of the population) who are Islamic. There are 9 individuals (or about 0.35% of the population) who belong to another church (not listed on the census), 148 (or about 5.81% of the population) belong to no church, are agnostic or atheist, and 116 individuals (or about 4.55% of the population) did not answer the question.

The historical population is given in the following table:

Year	Population
1850	906
1900	789
1950	1,148
1960	1,444
1970	1,936
1980	2,136
1990	2,258
2000	2,549
2010	2,587
2016	2,702

Most of the population (as of 2000) speaks German (80.0%), with Romansh being second most common (6.7%).

Languages in Flims
Languages	Census 1980		Census 1990		Census 2000	
Languages	Number	Percent	Number	Percent	Number	Percent
German	1439	67.0 %	1802	80.0%	2038	80.0%
Romansh	432	20.0 %	200	9.0%	171	7.0%
Italian	91	4.0 %	62	3.0%	60	3.0%
Population	2136	100%	2258	100%	2549	100%

== Sightseeing attractions ==
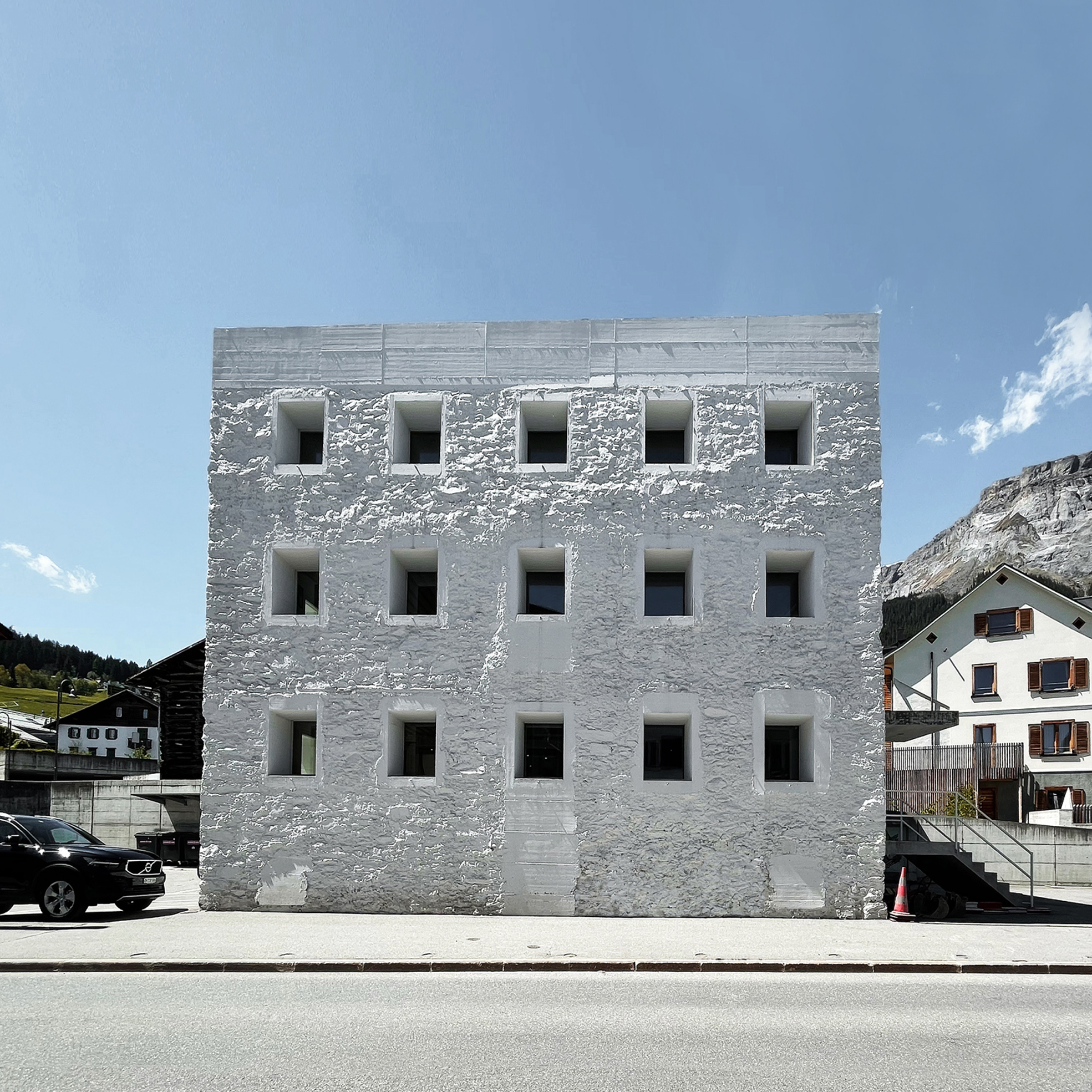
Yellow House

- 1999: Yellow house museum by Valerio Olgiati, Raphael Zuber and Pascal Flammer
- 2006: Il spir by Corinna Menn
