= Spir =

Spir or SPIR may refer to:

- Spir, recently discovered class of actin nucleators in actin remodeling
- Afrikan Aleksandrovich Spir (1837–1890), Russian philosopher
- Juan Carlos Spir (1990) Colombian tennis player
- Spir (album), an album by Karl Seglem's Sogn-A-Song
- Spir (imprint), an imprint of VDM Publishing that publishes and sells Wikipedia articles in printed form via print on demand
- Il spir, a viewing platform in the canton of Graubünden in Switzerland
- Spectral presaturation with inversion recovery, a sequence of magnetic resonance imaging

== Acronyms ==
- Serviciul de Poliție pentru Intervenție Rapidă, a Romanian rapid response police unit
- Special Purpose Islamic Regiment, a Chechen organization
- Standard Portable Intermediate Representation, an intermediate language for parallel compute and graphics by Khronos Group
