= DPIR =

DPIR may refer to:

- Detașamentul de Poliție pentru Intervenție Rapidă, the Rapid Intervention Police Squad in Romania
- the Department of Primary Industry and Resources administered by the Minister for Primary Industry and Resources (Northern Territory), Australia
- the Death Penalty India Report on Capital punishment in India
- Department of Politics and International Relations, University of Oxford, academic department in UK
