= Serviciul pentru Intervenții și Acțiuni Speciale =

Romanian Police task force

The Serviciul pentru Intervenții și Acțiuni Speciale (Special Actions and Intervention Service, SIAS) is a Romanian Police task force created in 1995 as part of the Counter-Organized crime Squad.

== Duties ==
Its roles include seizing and neutralizing dangerous or armed criminals, and performing hostage rescues. SIAS also helps to rescue people in disasters in any area of the country in cooperation with the aviation unit of the Ministry of Administration and Interior.

SIAS ensures the protection of policemen, witnesses and others involved in criminal investigations if they have been pressured or threatened. SIAS also ensures protection of the heads of the Ministry of Internal Affairs, General Inspectorate of the Romanian Police, chiefs of police of other states or foreign delegations visiting Romania. SIAS takes part in extradition operations and handles those extradited to Romania.

== Organization ==
The bomb squad division of SIAS deals with explosive devices placed in public or private places and it also carries out specialized technical control with the purpose of preventing the disturbance of public peace and order by using explosive means and contributes to the education of the population to minimize the risk of harm by explosives.

== Similar units from countries located near Romania ==
- Bulgarian Ministry of the Interior's Specialized Counter Terrorism Unit
- Hungary's Counter Terrorism Centre
- Serbian Police's Special Anti-Terrorist Unit
- Moldovan Police's Special Forces Brigade "Fulger"
- Ukrainian National Police's Rapid Operational Response Unit
- Russian National Guard's 604th Special Purpose Center, Special Purpose Mobile Unit (OMON), and Special Rapid Response Unit (SOBR)
- Turkey's General Directorate of Security's Police Special Operation Department
