= Flims rockslide =

Largest landslide in the Alps

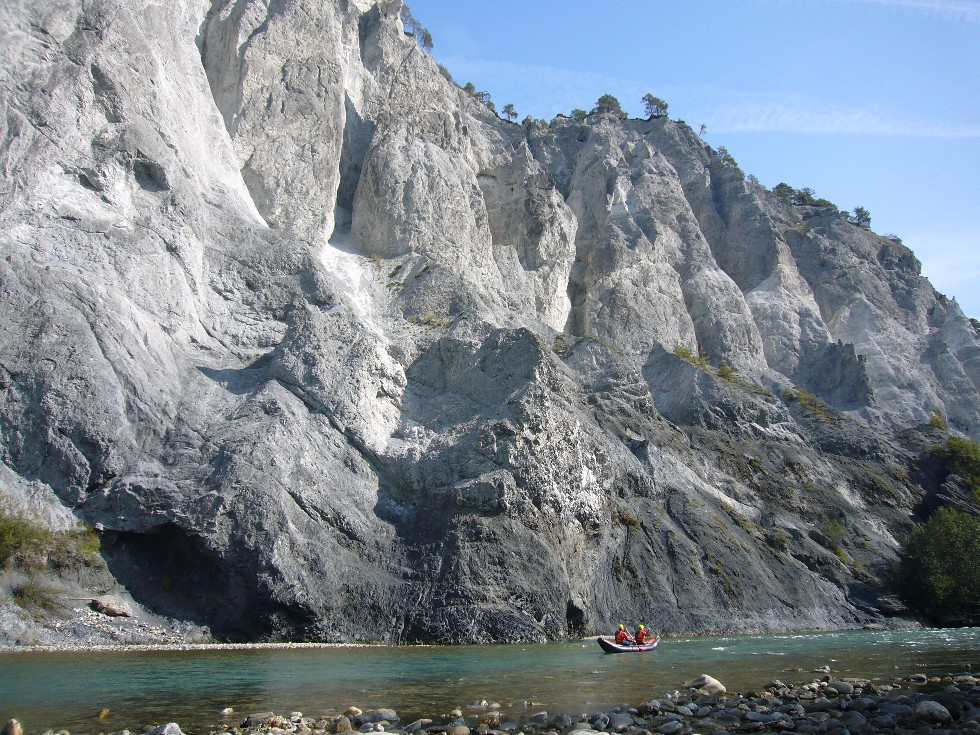
Rhine cutting through Flims rockslide debris

The Flims rockslide happened about 10,000 years ago (8000 BC) in eastern Switzerland. It is the largest known landslide in the Alps, and the biggest worldwide whose effects are still visible, moving some 12 km^{3} (2.9 cu mi) of rock, about 300 times that of the historic Swiss Goldau landslide. The town of Flims can be found at the line where the slip surface disappears under the debris. North of Flims the rock face of Flimserstein stands 350 metres (1,148 ft) high whereas more westerly the slide surface is clearly visible. South of Flims is a huge hilly debris area that has been forest ever since, as this area is not suitable for farming, firstly for its shape, and even more for its lack of water. The river Rhine crosses this debris in a gorge called Ruinaulta. The Rhine still runs in debris, which shows that it has not yet reached the level it had before the incident. The highest hill in the debris area is almost 200 metres (656 ft) higher than Flims at the end of the sliding surface.

== Landscape ==
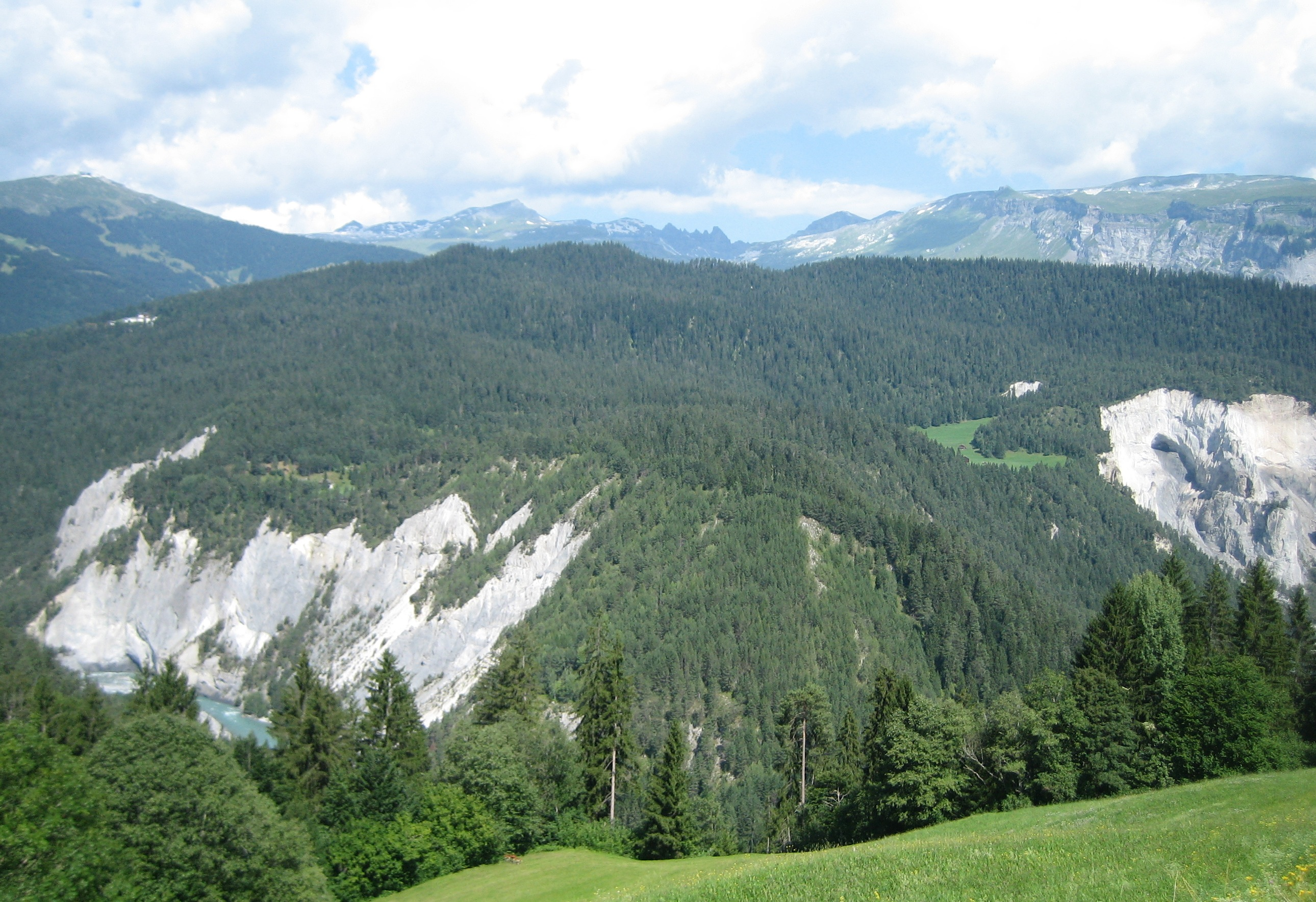
Debris area seen from the south

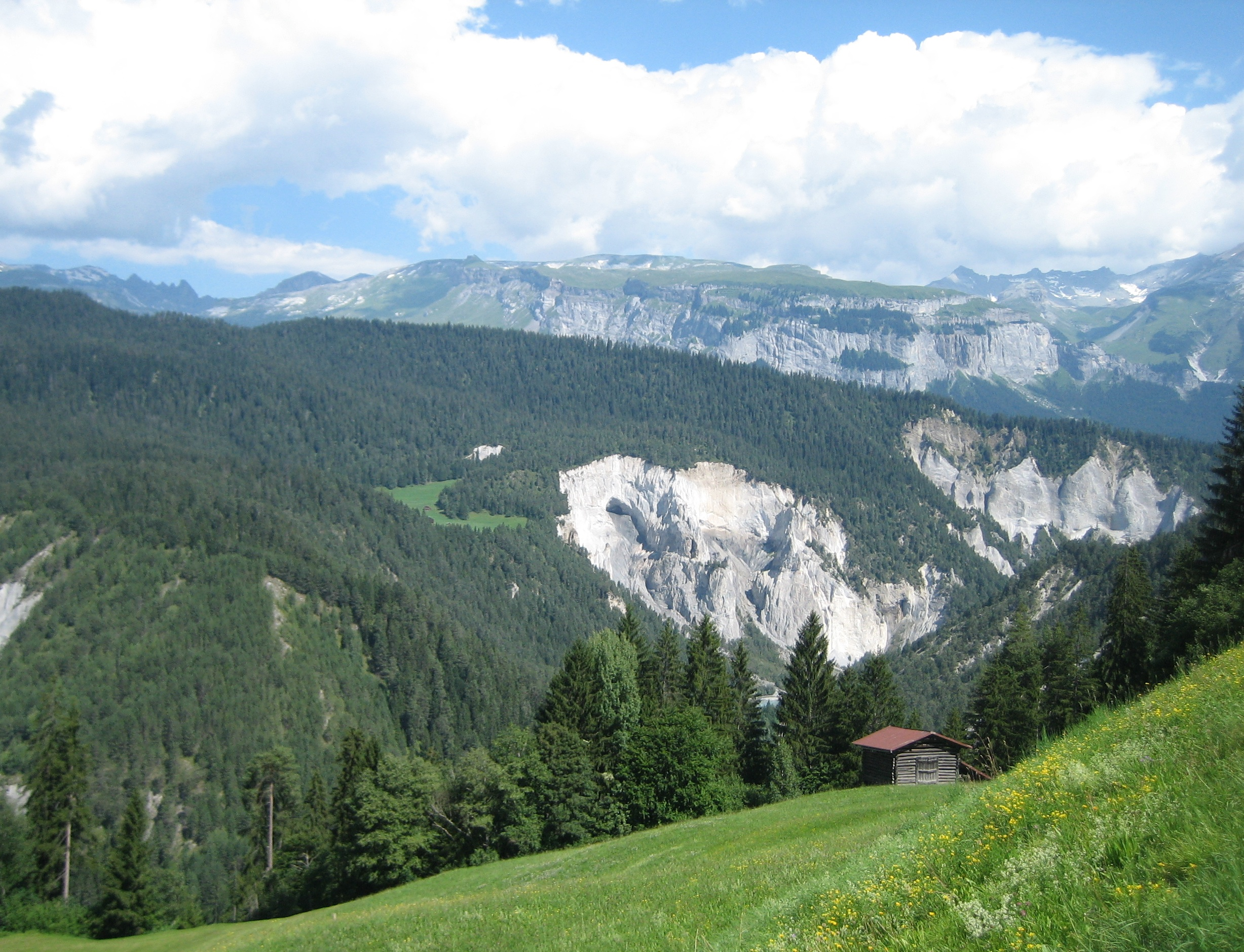
Flims lies behind the hill

The top of the slide surface can be found at 2,700 metres (8,858 ft) above sea north of Flims at Fil de Cassons; the end of the slide surface is at about 1100. The pre-slide valley would have been at 600 metres (1,969 ft). The rock is Mesozoic limestone, including Mergel; the angle of slide is (only) 20° to 25°. Debris covers 40 km^{2} (15 sq mi). Pressure baked the debris together to a somewhat stable rock. Given the river Rhine as a base of the valley, the debris is as high as 600 metres (1,969 ft). This debris dammed the Vorderrhein and created a lake in the Ilanz area. The level of the lake was found to have been at a maximum of 840 metres (2,756 ft) above sea level, which results in a lake some 10 miles (16 km) long.

== Dating ==
Clemens Augenstein from the Geologisches Institut der ETH Zürich explored with Flavio Anselmetti the sediments at a small lake called Dachlisee at 1,137 metres (3,730 ft) near Obersaxen. The lake with no river flowing into it lies opposite Flims, some 6 miles (9.7 km) away. They were looking for dust, as an incident of this size would have produced a large dust cloud. Drilling five times into the sediment, they found embedded limestone dust. Using carbon dating the limestone dust was found to be 10,055 years old (±195 years).

A second source is wood that was found inside the debris in the region some 2 miles (3.2 km) upstream of the mouth of the river Rabiusa, which was covered by massive rock identified as being from the Fil de Cassons area, hence reaching this point during the event. It was too old for the dendrochronology line but confirmed the above carbon dating.

Isotopic surface exposure dating of boulders exposed by the rockslide has yielded an age of 8900 ± 700 years.

== Flow system ==
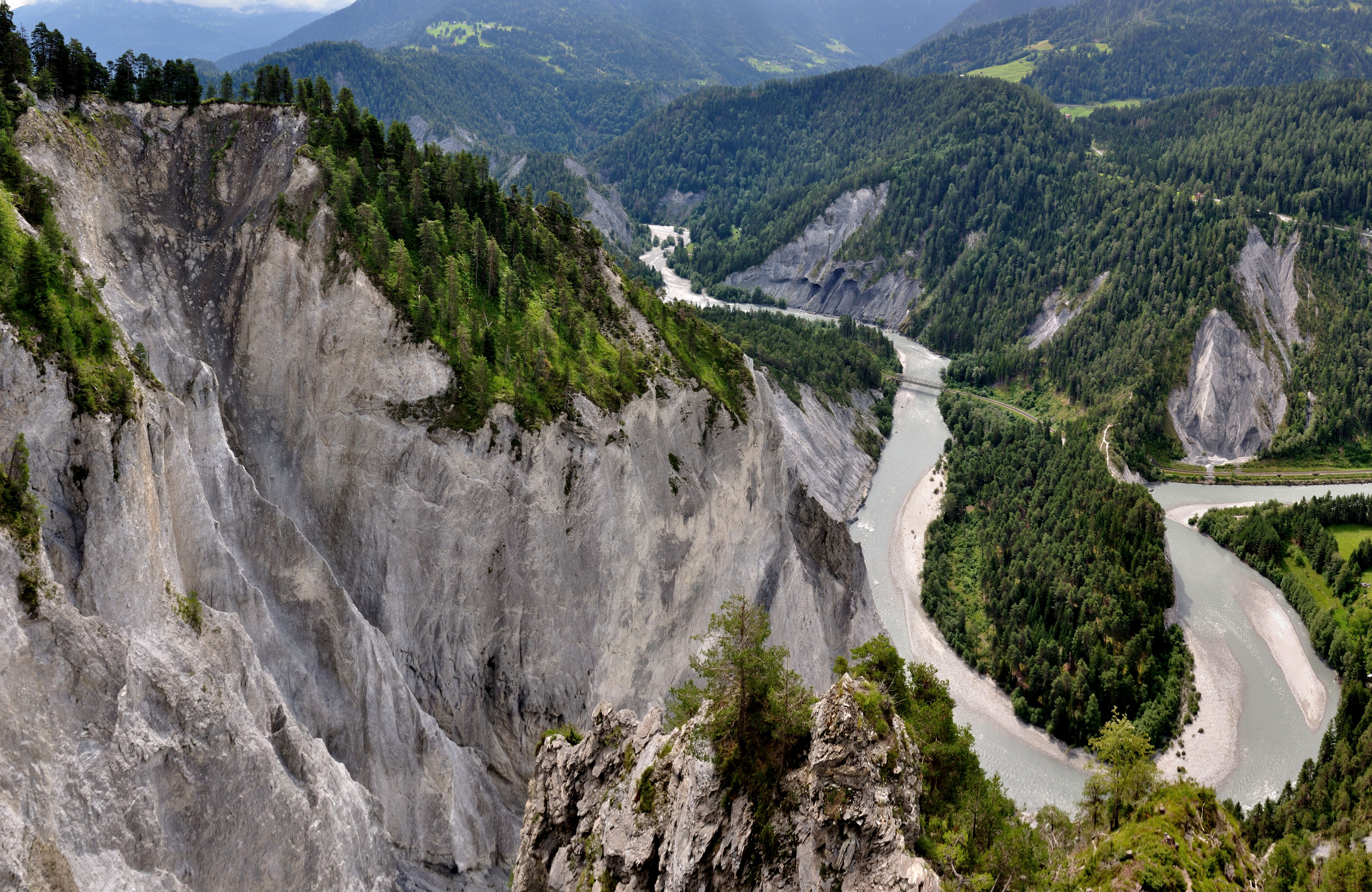
Rhein Gorge Ruinaulta with railway bridge

After the slide most of the water escaped through the upper section of the debris. There are several examples of rivers disappearing in the Alps and also in Scotland. The lakes in the debris area, such as Caumasee, still behave in this way. The Ilanz lake existed some 1000 to 2000 years before the water cut through the debris, creating the gorge.

== Sightseeing ==
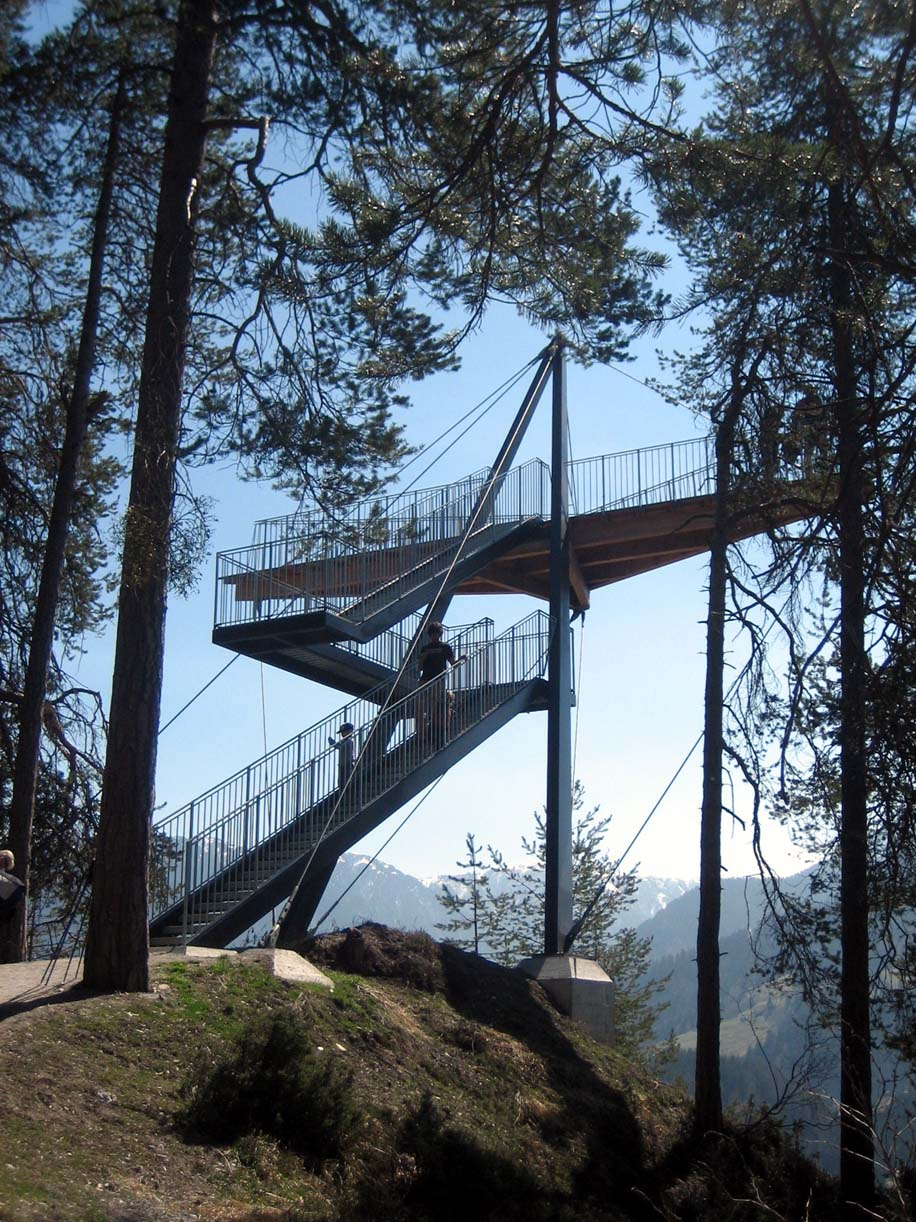
Viewing platform at Conn near Flims

- Dutjen above Valendas is opposite the rockslide and gives an overview of it.
- The aerial cableway from Flims onto Cassonsgrat leads to the tear-off edge of the landslide. There are various hikes to this ridge as well. One route uses the ascent via Val Bargis, offering a scenic view, although the rockslide area is not visible before reaching the top.
- The railway line of the Rhätische Bahn crosses Ruinaulta close to river Rhine. Except for access to the railway stations, there are no roads into this area and no parking. A footpath leads through two-thirds of the gorge, the last bit is being built in 2010–2011. Connections lead out of the gorge.
- In Conn on the debris there is a viewing platform in the shape of a common swift, overlooking Ruinaulta. The route there crosses a small irrigation channel that ancient farmers built to bring water to fields in the area, as there is no natural surface water.
- There is river rafting on the Rhine.

== Notes ==
- Albert Heim: Der alte Bergsturz von Flims 18. Jahrbuch des Schweizer Alpenklub 1882-1883 p. 295-309
- [BERGSTURZ-GEBIETE DER SCHWEIZ, PROFILE] [Kartenmaterial] / Alb. Heim. - Zürich: Kunstanstalt J.C.Müller, Abt.Kartogr.Hofer, 191.. [000450082]
- G. Hartung: Das alte Bergsturzgebiet von Flims, Zeitschrift der Gesellschaft für Erdkunde. Berlin (19) 1884
- Dr. Julius Weber: Klubführer; Geologische Wanderungen durch die Schweiz (II), 1913 S. 162-173
- Seesedimente auf der Flimser Bergsturzmasse: ein neuer Ansatz zur Datierung der grössten Massenbewegung der Alpen (~ 9490 - 9460 cal. y BP): Flims/Laax, Graubünden, Schweiz / Gaudenz Deplazes. Zürich; 2005.. 140 S.: Ill. + 4 Falttaf.. [005083370]
- Emil Kirchen: Wenn der Berg stürzt: das Bergsturzbegiet zwischen Chur und Ilanz - Chur [etc.]: Terra Grischuna, cop. 1993. [000943845] ISBN 3-7298-1087-1
- Zur Hydrogeologie des Bergsturzgebietes im Raum Flims / Y. P. Bonanomi.. . [et al.]. - Bern: Landeshydrologie und -geologie, cop. 1994. (Geologische Berichte / Landeshydrologie und -geologie; Nr. 17) [000955866]
- Carl Bieler: Als der Berg runterkam, 2006, Migros-Magazin
