= Alerta Răpire Copil =

Romanian official child abduction alert system

Alertă Răpire Copil (English: Child Abduction Alert) is the child abduction alert system used by the Romanian Ministry of Administration and Interior and Romanian Police. The system was launched on April 18, 2011.

== History ==
Before Alertă Rapire Copil was implemented, there was no official public awareness system for such cases. The only means people could find out about a child abduction was through the website of the local police, or very limited public announcement devices.

In the late year of 2007, Romania was the first country in the North-Eastern European Union to join the Call Child Alert Project, an initiative funded and supported by the European Commission. As a result of the partnership, Romania received funding and the project has begun.

In 2010, the infrastructure has been established and the system was ready to be launched.

In April 2011, Alertă Rapire Copil has been launched to the public.

== Activity and accomplishment methods ==
The aim of the mechanism is to find the child, and save their life. It should be done by spreading the alert through as many ways as possible, to as many people and places as possible; collecting as much relevant information from the citizens as possible; quick response of the law enforcement bodies.

The fast spread of the information can be achieved through all forms of written or verbal communications available, including variable message signs. The standard audio message that is broadcast along with a visual aid (where possible) is

The General Inspectorate of the Romanian Police has activated the Alertă Răpire Copil system. The missing victim is named ... . He is ... years old and have the following physical description ... . The child has last been seen in ... , wearing ... . He may have been abducted by a suspect with the following description ... , and he may be heading towards ... . If you have any knowledge about this, dial 112 immediately. Do not attempt to intervene yourself.

The visual message may vary, and it may include a photo, age, last known location and other relevant details.

== Launching an alert ==
The entity that is authorized to place an alert is the Police Department that has received (and briefly investigated) the formal complaint. The system can be started, only if all of these circumstances exist:

- The child/teenager is presumed to be under the age of 18
- The child is in either of these situations: has been abducted with witnesses or as a result of the inquiry, it has been concluded that the circumstances are putting his life, health or physical integrity at risk
- The known information is likely to lead to the missing child

The alert can be banned if the leak of information is threatening the child's life.

== See also ==
- Amber alert
- Police of Romania
