= Coat of arms of the Romanian Gendarmerie =

- Shield: blue shield, a silver rhombus, coming out of a three leaf garland and having a stylized "J" letter in the midst
- Motto: Latin: LEX ET ORDO

The heraldic ensigns of the Gendarmerie consist of the following elements: large blue shield with a crusader golden eagle, having its head turned to the right, red peak and claws, open wings, holding a silver sword in its right claw; the green olive branch, symbolizing peace and order, replacing the mace from the coat of arms of the country. The small blue shield, placed on the eagle’s chest, having a silver rhombus, coming out of a three leaf garland and having a stylized "J" letter in the midst. At the bottom of the external shield, on a white scarf, the motto of the ministry is written in black: Latin: LEX ET ORDO.

The rhombus symbolizes the life, the prosperity, the reward. The letter "J" signifies, since the nineteenth century, the Romanian Gendarmerie. The oak leaf garland symbolizes the power of sacrifice and duration of the lawful state.
