= Coat of arms of the Romanian Police =

- Shield: blue shield with a golden balance having its scales well-balanced, in the upper part, and, in its lower part, two Roman axes, crossed and natural
- Motto: Latin: LEX ET HONOR

The heraldic ensigns of the Romanian Police consist of the following elements: large blue shield with a crusader golden eagle, having its head turned to the right, red peak and claws, open wings, holding a silver sword in its right claw; the green olive branch, symbolizing peace and order, replacing the mace from the coat of arms of the country. The small blue shield, placed on the eagle’s chest, having a golden balance having its scales well-balanced, in the upper part, and, in its lower part, two Roman fasces, crossed and natural; at the bottom of the external shield, on a white scarf, the motto of the ministry is written in black: Latin: LEX ET HONOR.

The balance symbolizes the social justice, highlighting the competence of the institution in the field of law enforcement. The Roman fasces evoke the attributions of the Romanian Police in a lawful state, as a guarantee of public order.
