= Detașamentul de Poliție pentru Intervenție Rapidă =

DPIR squad in action

DPIR soldier

DPIR squad

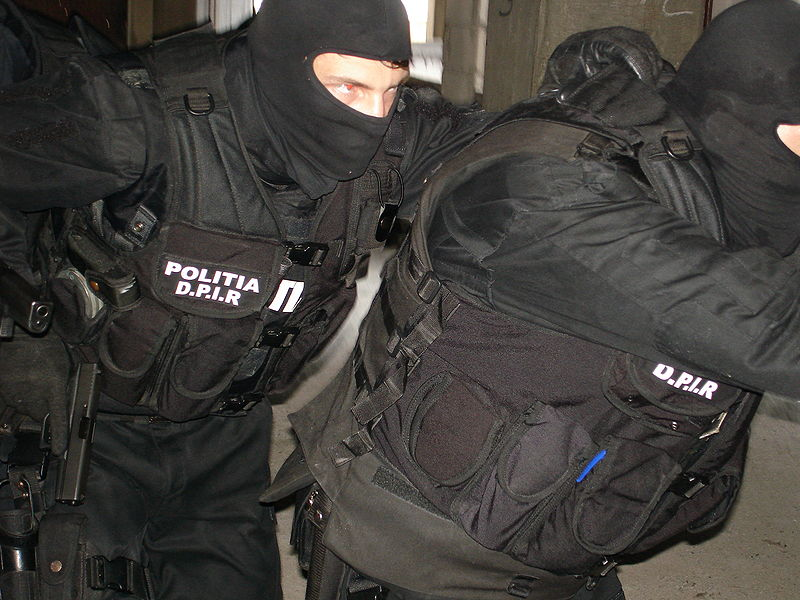
DPIR in action

Detașamentul Poliției pentru Intervenție Rapidă (DPIR, Rapid Intervention Police Squad) is the common name in Romania for county-level police rapid intervention units.

== Structure ==
Romania is divided into 41 counties (județe) plus Bucharest. Each county (județ) is centered on a municipality. Each one of the 41 municipalities has a main police headquarters for that county. Starting in the 1990s, the municipalities' police sections created Rapid Intervention detachments, to participate in operations that could pose a life-threatening risk to the officers involved in carrying them out. Detașamentul de Intervenții și Acțiuni Speciale (DIAS, Special Actions and Interventions Detachment). DIAS groups were formed in all 41 municipalities, as well as in Bucharest. In 1999, however, Constantin Dudu Ionescu, who then headed the Ministry of Administration and Interior (MAI), signed the order for creating a much larger organization, called Serviciul de Poliție pentru Intervenție Rapidă (SPIR). SPIR was basically a much-enlarged DIAS, which was now composed of several teams, plus logistics and support structures. In November 2001, all 41 municipalities were obliged to change the names of their special detachments from DIAS; most were renamed to DPIR.

Although all municipalities have their own DPIR teams, in some of them the detachments have different names. In the city of Bistrița for example, the combatants still wear uniforms marked with DIAS, while in Bacău the detachments are called DIR (not to be confused with an elite unit from the Ministry of Defense, Detașamentul de Intervenție Rapidă).

In Piatra Neamț, the team acts under the designation SIR, and is an entire Service, similar to SPIR (Serviciul de Poliție pentru Intervenție Rapidă) in Bucharest. To avoid confusion, all detachments which are under the command of the municipalities are practically referred to as DPIR, while the service in the capital city of Bucharest is referred to as SPIR.

In each municipality, DPIR is composed by the combatant detachment DIAS and the EOD (Explosive Ordnance Disposal) detachment DIR.

In Bucharest, SPIR is composed by several detachments, which include the DIAS and DIR. Therefore, although Romanian newspapers and TV stations have unanimously adopted the names DPIR/SPIR for the action teams, the population and personal websites/blogs still use the nomination DIAS. Depending on point of view (DIAS being incorporated into DPIR/SPIR), they are both halfway correct.

In the rest of the country, DPIR is composed by several units including EOD (Explosive Ordnance Disposal), dog unit, riot control and hostage rescue. The units train daily in unarmed/armed combat, rapid intervention shooting, building searches, aircraft, marine, railway firearms intervention skills. The unit members are selected individually and are tested thoroughly throughout their careers. Most of the unit team members are frequently cross trained with other similar detachments including visitors from overseas police forces. Romania joined the EU in 2007, the DPIR's have been better funded and supplied with the latest equipment. Selection for the DPIR is extremely vigorous and only the most determined are accepted for continuation training. Recently in 2008 there have been joint training exercises with the GSPI, in 2009 they have also been involved in close protection, internal security, hazardous warrant and counter terrorist operations.
