= Romanian Police =

Law enforcement agency

Romanian Police Poliția Română
- Coat of arms of the Romanian Police
- Common name: Poliția
- Abbreviation: PR
- Motto: Lex et Honor; Law and Honour

Agency overview
- Formed: 27 December 1989
- Preceding agency: Miliția
- Employees: 45,391 (2007)
- Annual budget: 900 million EUR

Jurisdictional structure
- National agency: ROU
- Operations jurisdiction: ROU
- General nature: Civilian police

Operational structure
- Headquarters: 6 Mihai Vodă street, Bucharest
- Sworn members: 44,000
- Agency executive: Benone-Marian Matei, Secretary of State, General Inspector
- Parent agency: Ministry of Internal Affairs

Website
- www.politiaromana.ro

The Romanian Police (Romanian: Poliția Română, pronounced [poˈlit͡si.a roˈmɨnə]) is the national police force and main civil law enforcement agency in Romania. It is subordinated to the Ministry of Internal Affairs and it is led by a General Inspector with the rank of Secretary of State.

== Duties ==
The Romanian Police is responsible for:

- policing in Romania
- the protection of the fundamental rights and liberties of the citizens and of the private and public property
- the prevention and identification of criminal offences and their perpetrators
- maintaining the public order and safety

== Organization ==
General Inspectorate of Romanian Police is the central unit of police in Romania, which manages, guides, supports and controls the activity of the Romanian police units, investigates and analyses very serious crimes related to organized crime, economic, financial or banking criminality, or to other crimes which make the object of the criminal cases investigated by the Prosecutor's Office attached to the High Court of Cassation and Justice, and which has any other attributions assigned by law.

The organizational chart of General Inspectorate of Romanian Police includes general directorates, directorates, services and, offices established by the order of the Minister of Internal Affairs.

The General Inspectorate is under the command of a General Inspector appointed by the Minister of Internal Affairs. Since March 2015, the General Inspector of the Police is appointed by the Prime Minister and also holds the rank of Secretary of State.

=== Central units ===
- General Directorate for Countering the Organized crime - with five central directorates (Anti-Drug Directorate, Directorate of Combating Human trafficking, Cybercrime Directorate, Directorate of Combating Terrorism Financing and Money laundering, Special Operations Directorate) and 15 regional Brigades of Countering Organized Criminality. These Brigades are specialized units and have the mission to fight against organized crime, drug trafficking, human trafficking, illegal migration, cyber crime, serious financial frauds, financing terrorism and money laundering.
- General Directorate for Criminal Investigations - with three central directorates: Fraud Investigations Directorate, Criminal Investigations Directorate, Directorate of Firearms, Explosives and Poison.
- General Directorate for Public Safety Police - with three central directorates: Public Order Directorate, Traffic Police Directorate, Transport Police Directorate.
- General Directorate for Administrative Police - with four central directorates: Forensics Institute, Directorate for Criminal Records, Statistics and Operational Registry, Directorate for Logistics Management, the Directorate for IT&C.

Under the command of the General Inspectorate of the Romanian Police operates a specialized intervention squad, The Independent Service of Special Interventions and Operations.

=== Territorial units ===
The Romanian Police is divided into 41 county police inspectorates, corresponding to each county (județ), and the Bucharest General Directorate of Police.

Each county police inspectorate has a rapid reaction unit (Detașamentul de Poliție pentru Intervenție Rapidă, Police Rapid Intervention Squad). The similar unit attached to the Bucharest Police is called Serviciul de Poliție pentru Intervenție Rapidă (Police Rapid Intervention Service).

== Equipment ==
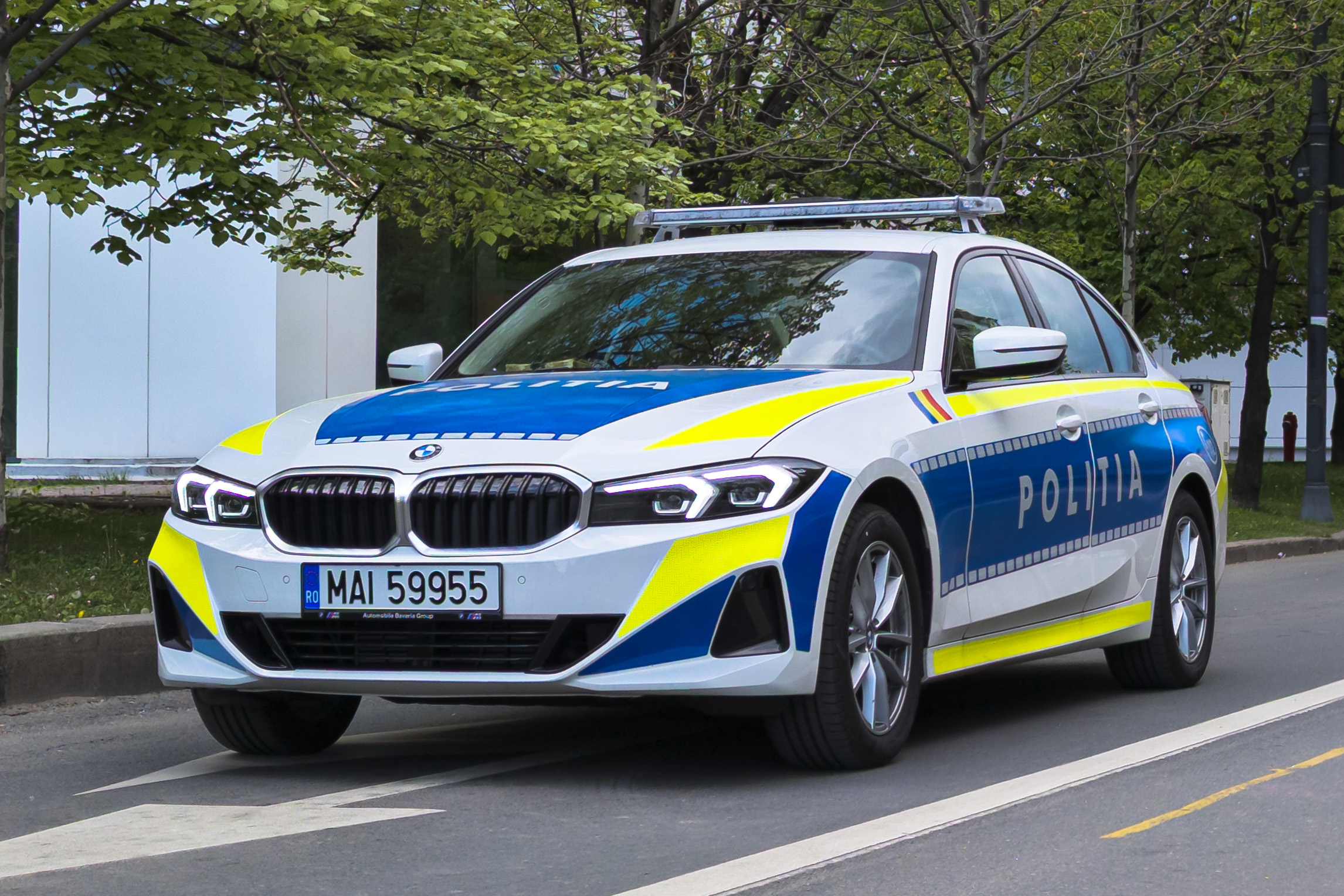
BMW 3 Series vehicle in Romanian Police service

=== Vehicles ===
In 2011, the Romanian Police had roughly 10,500 intervention vehicles.

Today, the fleet is composed largely of BMW 3 Series, Dacia Logan, Dacia Duster and Volkswagen Polo vehicles, with Mercedes Vito and Volkswagen Transporter T6 models used by the special forces and border police. Very few old Volkswagen Passat are also in service. The Road/Traffic Police also has BMW motorbikes, Seat, Lotus and Alfa Romeo vehicles, used for road chasing.

In 2020, the Ministry of Interior Affairs acquired 6,744 brand new vehicles which would also feature a new painting scheme, similar to those in Germany or Sweden. These were delivered in autumn 2020 and had been produced at the local Dacia factory in Mioveni. A significant part of the acquired vehicles are Dacia Duster (2018 model year), being the first time a crossover SUV is introduced in the force on a large, nationwide scale and Dacia Logan (2017 model year, newest at the time of acquisition).

In July 2022, following a controversial auction, the General Inspectorate of the Romanian Police finalised the acquisition of 600 BMW 3 Series 320i xDrive Sedan vehicles (2023 model year). These have engines that have a power output of 184 hp (125 kW) and 300Nm torque, 8+1 speed automatic transmissions, all wheel drive, accelerate from 0 to 100 km/h in 7.7 seconds and reach a top speed of 230 km/h. The cars are painted in white and are G20 3 Series LCI models. The specific equipment consists of the new Romanian Police blue-yellow reflective livery, lightbar, additional battery and socket in the trunk, a set of winter tires and extended warranty. The price of each vehicle was €33,200 with the total acquisition being cofinanced by the European Union through the Big Infrastructure Operational Program (Programul Operațional Infrastructură Mare, POIM). Such, 300 vehicles were financed by the EU and 300 by the Romanian State.

In March 2023, the first batch of the vehicles purchased in 2022 was delivered and they were inaugurated with the occasion of the Romanian Police Day event.

The police also uses helicopters for air surveillance and immediate response. The most common manufacturer is Eurocopter.

=== Weapons ===
In 2020, the Romanian Police acquired 25,000 Beretta Px4 pistols, they had entered regular service by the end of 2020. The special services units (S.I.A.S. and S.A.S.) use Glock pistols and HK-MP5 submachine guns.

== Ranks ==
Before 2002, the National Police had military status and a military ranking system (see Romanian Armed Forces ranks and insignia). In June 2002 it became a civilian police force (one of the first police services in Eastern Europe) and its personnel was structured into two corps:

- Corpul ofițerilor de poliție (Police Officers Corps) - corresponding to the commissioned ranks of a military force, to the ranks of Inspector, Superintendent and Commissioner in a British-style police force or to the both Corps de conception et de direction and Corps de commande et d'encadrement in the French National Police (Police Nationale).

Rank	Shoulder insignia	Translated as	Military rank equivalent	French police rank equivalent	British Metropolitan Police rank equivalent
Chestor-general de poliție		Police General-Quaestor	General	Directeur des services actifs	Commissioner
Chestor-șef de poliție		Police Chief-Quaestor	Lieutenant General	Inspecteur général	Assistant Commissioner
Chestor principal de poliție		Police Principal Quaestor	Major General	Contrôleur général	Deputy Assistant Commissioner
Chestor de poliție		Police Quaestor	Brigadier General	Comissaire général	Commander
Comisar-șef de poliție		Police Chief-Commissioner	Colonel	Commissaire divisionnaire	Chief Superintendent
Comisar de poliție		Police Commissioner	Lieutenant Colonel	Commissaire de police	Superintendent Grade I
Subcomisar de poliție		Police Sub-Commissioner	Major	Commandant	Superintendent
Inspector principal de poliție		Police Principal Inspector	Captain	Capitaine	Chief Inspector
Inspector de poliție		Police Inspector	Lieutenant	Lieutenant	Inspector
Subinspector de poliție		Police Sub-Inspector	Second Lieutenant	Lieutenant intern	Temporary/Probationary Inspector

- Corpul agenților de poliție (Police Agents Corps) - corresponding to the non-commissioned ranks of a military force, to the Corps d'encadrement et d'application in the French National Police or to the ranks of Constable or Sergeant in a British-style police force.

Rank	Shoulder insignia	Translated as	Military rank equivalent	French police rank equivalent	British police rank equivalent
Agent-șef principal de poliție		Police Principal Chief Agent	Sergeant Major	Major	Station Sergeant
Agent-șef de poliție		Police Chief Agent	Master Sergeant	Brigadier-chef	Station Sergeant
Agent-șef adjunct de poliție		Police Deputy Chief Agent	Sergeant First Class	Brigadier	Sergeant
Agent principal de poliție		Police Principal Agent	Staff Sergeant	Sous-Brigadier	Acting Sergeant
Agent de poliție		Police Agent	Sergeant	Gardien de la paix	Constable

== See also ==
- Romanian Border Police
- Romanian Military Police
- Gendarmerie (Romania)
- Crime in Romania
- Alerta Răpire Copil
