= Constantin Anton =

Romanian politician and brigadier general

- Born: May 21, 1894; Bucharest, Kingdom of Romania
- Died: March 17, 1993 (aged 98) Bucharest, Romania
- Branch: Romanian Army
- Rank: Brigadier general

Constantin Anton (May 21, 1894 in Bucharest – March 17, 1993 in Bucharest) was a brigadier general of the Romanian Armed Forces during World War II.

From 1944 to 1946, he served as the Inspector-General of the Jandarmeria Română, a Romanian military police force. In 1948, he was arrested and tried by the Bucharest People's Tribunal for "complicity with high treason". He was sentenced to 18 years of hard labor as a result. In 1952, his sentence was altered to 10 years in prison and demotion to civilian status. In 1959, he was released, and in 1964 he was reinstated to the socialist army with the rank of divisional general.
