= Gendarmerie (Romania) =

Military police force in Romania

Romanian Gendarmerie Jandarmeria Română
- Coat of arms

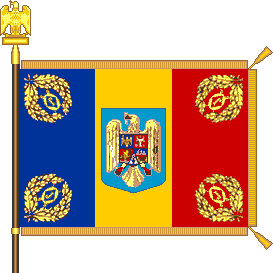
- Military colors
- Common name: Jandarmeria
- Abbreviation: JR
- Motto: LEX ET ORDO; Law and Order

Agency overview
- Formed: 3 April 1850
- Annual budget: 4 billion EUR

Jurisdictional structure
- National agency: RO
- International agency: RO
- Countries: Yes
- Operations jurisdiction: RO
- General nature: Gendarmerie

Operational structure
- Headquarters: Bucharest Str. Jandarmeriei nr. 9 -11, sector 1
- Agency executive: General-major Alin Mastan, General-Inspector
- Parent agency: Ministry of Internal Affairs
- Units: Counter-terrorism Law enforcement Special operations International peacekeeping missions

Website
- Romanian Gendarmerie Website

The Romanian Gendarmerie (Romanian: Jandarmeria Română, pronounced [ʒandarmeˈri.a roˈmɨnə]) is the national gendarmerie force of Romania, tasked with high-risk and specialized law enforcement duties. It is one of the two main police forces in Romania (the other being the Romanian Police - a civilian force), both having jurisdiction over the civilian population.

The gendarmerie is subordinated Ministry of Internal Affairs and does not have responsibility for policing the Romanian Armed Forces. This duty lies with the Military Police subordinated to the Romanian Land Forces.

== History ==
=== The beginnings ===
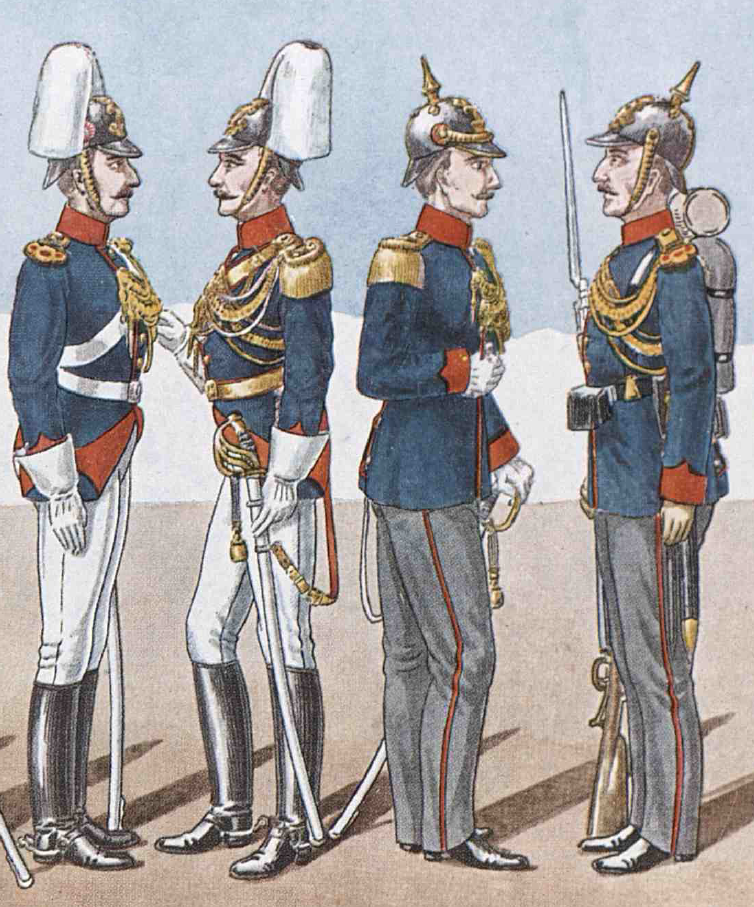
Gendarmerie uniforms in 1868

The first Gendarmerie corps was created on 3 April 1850 in Moldavia by Prince Grigore Alexandru Ghica. After the Union of Moldavia and Wallachia in 1859 under Prince Alexandru Ioan Cuza, the Gendarmerie was subordinated to the Ministry of War as a separate armed force.

During the Romanian War of Independence of 1877–1878, it mainly served as military police, but it also took part in combat.

=== Rural Gendarmerie ===
In 1893, the Rural Gendarmerie (Jandarmeria Rurală) was established by the Law for the Organization of the Rural Gendarmerie (Legea pentru organizarea Jandarmeriei rurale) as a military corps under the authority of the Ministry of Justice for policing the countryside and under the authority of Ministry of War for military police functions. The bill was proposed by Lascăr Catargiu's Conservative government and it was promulgated by the King on 30 August 1893. The first article of the Ordinance regarding the Implementation of the Rural Gendarmerie Law mentioned that:

The organization of the Rural Gendarmerie, as described in the law, makes this institution a military body, subordinated to the Internal Affairs Minister, with the mission to maintain the public order and security. It is also subordinated to the Justice Minister, the Public Minister for policing duties, and to the War Minister for all the aspects regarding military discipline, command and troops' training.

The Peasants' Revolt of 1907 revealed the unpreparedness of the Gendarmerie and its inability to control and quell the rebellion. As a result, another bill (Legea Jandarmeriei) was adopted on 24 March 1908. The new law re-organized the institution, making it a component of the Army with provost duties and transferring commissioned officers from the Army to the Gendarmerie.

=== The world wars ===
The Romanian Gendarmerie was engaged during the Second Balkan War and the First World War with military police duties, policing the front, guarding important installations and organizing the evacuation during the 1916 retreat. The corps also saw actual combat during the 1917 campaign (see also Romanian Campaign (World War I)). The Gendarmerie oversaw the demobilization of the Army in July 1918 and the re-mobilization in October 1918 and maintained the public order in the new territories.

Upon the entry of Romania into the Second World War on 22 June 1941, the Gendarmerie took over its military police duties again. It was also involved in the deportation of Jews and Roma to Transnistria in 1941 and 1942 (see also Romania and the Holocaust).

=== Cold War era ===
After the war, the Communist regime purged and disbanded (on 23 January 1949) the Gendarmerie, its personnel being redistributed to the newly created Directorate for Security Troops, modeled after the NKVD Internal Troops.

=== After 1989 ===
The Romanian Gendarmerie was re-established on 5 July 1990.

Starting in 2006, the corps abandoned conscription and in 2007 it became an all-professional military force.

== The mission and duties ==
Its mission:

Law no. 550/2004 regarding the organization and functioning of the Romanian Gendarmerie

Art. 1. -

(1) The Romanian Gendarmerie is the specialized institution of the state, with military status, component of the Ministry of Internal Affairs, which exercises, under the law, its attributions regarding the defense of public order and peace, of the fundamental rights and freedoms of citizens, public and private property, the prevention and detection of crime and other violations of the laws in force, as well as the protection of fundamental state institutions and the fight against acts of terrorism.

jurisprudence

(2) The Romanian Gendarmerie, through attributions, organization, training and territorial disposition, contributes to guaranteeing the sovereignty, independence, authority, unity and security of the state, constitutional democracy on the entire national territory both in peacetime and in crisis situations.

Article 2. -

The Romanian Gendarmerie carries out its activity in the interest of the citizens, of the community and in the support of the state institutions, exclusively on the basis and in the execution of the law.

Article 3. -

(1) The Romanian Gendarmerie cooperates, in fulfilling its attributions according to the law, with the other components of the Ministry of Internal Affairs, with structures of the defense and national security system and collaborates with organizations, institutions and authorities of central and local public administration, organizations non-governmental organizations, with other legal entities, as well as with natural persons.

(2) The Romanian Gendarmerie participates, in accordance with the law, in actions organized within the Association of European and Mediterranean Police and Gendarmerie Forces with Military Status or in those organized by similar bodies of other states and fulfills peacekeeping missions, according to international commitments assumed by Romania.

Its duties include:

- Maintaining and restoring the public order:
  - Crowd and riot control
  - Policing the mountainous areas and the Black Sea Coast resorts
  - Counter-terrorism activities
- Pursuing and apprehending fugitives and deserters
- Security of sensitive and vital installations, such as:
  - Public institutions, ministries and courts
  - Embassies and consulates
  - International airports (until 2005)
  - National museums
  - Nuclear power plants
- Security and protection of the secret mail all over the Romanian territory.

== Organization ==
=== General Inspectorate of the Gendarmerie ===
The General Inspectorate of the Gendarmerie is the central structure of the Romanian Gendarmerie under the command of a General Inspector (Inspector-general) appointed by the Minister of Internal Affairs.

The General Inspector is assisted by 3 deputies. The first deputy (prim-adjunct) is the chief of the Gendarmerie Staff and heads the Operational Planning and Management, Guard and Institutional Protection and the Public Order and Security Directorates. The other two deputies manage the Human Resources and the Military Schools Directorates, and the Logistics, IT and Communication Directorates respectively.

The task of the General Inspectorate is to plan, manage, coordinate and control the territorial inspectorates, the Mobile Squads, the Special Intervention Brigade and the military schools. The General Inspectorate of the Gendarmerie also acts as an interface of the organization with the other law enforcement agencies and the Internal Affairs Ministry.

=== Territorial organizations ===
The Romanian Gendarmerie is divided in 41 territorial inspectorates, corresponding to each county (județ), and the General Directorate of the Gendarmerie in Bucharest.

Additionally, eight Gendarmerie Mobile Groups (Grupări Mobile) operate on a territorial basis, with headquarters in Bacău, Brașov, Cluj Napoca, Constanța, Craiova, Ploiești, Târgu Mureș and Timișoara.

=== Special Intervention Brigade ===
The "Vlad Țepeș" Special Intervention Brigade has national jurisdiction. It handles special and high-risk situations, such as heavy rioting, hostage rescue and counter-terrorist operations.

=== Gendarmerie military schools ===
The officer cadets are trained for becoming commissioned officers at the Alexandru Ioan Cuza Police Academy in Bucharest.

In addition, the Mihai Viteazul Military School in Bucharest offers post-graduate courses (in collaboration with the French Gendarmerie) for commissioned officers, while the Grigore Alexandru Ghica Military School in Drăgășani and Petru Rareș Military School in Fălticeni train non-commissioned officers.

=== Combat Supply and Logistics Base ===
Also known as "Baza de Aprovizionare pentru Luptă și Gospodărire" (B.A.L.G.), "Baza de Administrare și Deservire" or "U.M. 0260" is a technical administrative unit under the command of General Inspectorate of the Gendarmerie. Its primary duties include administration of the buildings and other facilities inside the Inspectorate courtyard, the Gendarmerie's shooting range, vehicle repair and maintenance and farms providing food for the personnel of the Gendarmerie. The farms are located north of Bucharest.

== Requirements ==
- have Romanian citizenship and reside in Romania;
- to know the Romanian language, written and spoken;
- to have full capacity to exercise;
- be medically, physically and psychologically fit;
- be at least 18 years of age;
- be high school graduates with a baccalaureate diploma (for positions in the non-commissioned officer corps) / be university graduates (for positions in the officer corps);
- to behave in accordance with the conduct requirements accepted and practiced in society;
- not have a criminal record, except in the case of rehabilitation;
- not be under criminal investigation or trial for committing crimes;
- not to have been dismissed from a public position or to have had their individual employment contract terminated for disciplinary reasons in the last 7 years;
- not to have carried out political police activities, as defined by law;
- to meet the employment conditions provided for in the job description, for employment in military positions through direct employment.

=== List of commanders ===
The commanders of the Gendarmerie since its establishment in 1893:

- Mihail Rasty (1893–1896)
- Ioan Manoliu (1896–1898)
- Sache Poroineanu (1898–1899)
- Nicolae Alexandrescu (1899–1901)
- Gheorghe Mirinescu (1901–1908)
- Anton Berlescu (1908–1917)
- Constantin Sterea (1917–1918)
- Ludovig Mircescu (1918–1919)
- Ştefan Ştefănescu (1919–1920, 1922–1927)
- Mihail Racoviță (1920–1922)
- Ioan Vlădescu (1927)
- Cleante Davidoglu (1927–1928)
- Gheorghe Constantinescu (1928–1929)
- Constantin Stavăr (1929–1930)
- Eracle Nicoleanu (1930–1931)
- Constantin Dimitrescu (1931–1934)
- Barbu Părăianu (1934–1938)
- Ioan Bengliu (1938–1940)
- Ioan Topor (1940)
- Constantin Vasiliu (1940–1944)
- Constantin Anton (1944–1946)
- Ioan Alistar (1946–1949)
- Ion Bunoaică (1990–1995)
- Octavian Chițu (1995–1996)
- Stan Stângaciu (1996–1999)
- Anghel Andreescu (1999–2001)
- Tudor Cearapin (2001–2005)
- Costică Silion (2005–2009)
- Olimpiador Antonescu (2009– 2010)
- Costel Gavrilă (2010–2012)
- Gavrilă Pop (2012–2012)
- Mircea Olaru (2012–2016)
- Marin Andreiana (2016–2021 )
- Alin Ionel Mastan (acting) (2021– )

== Uniform ==
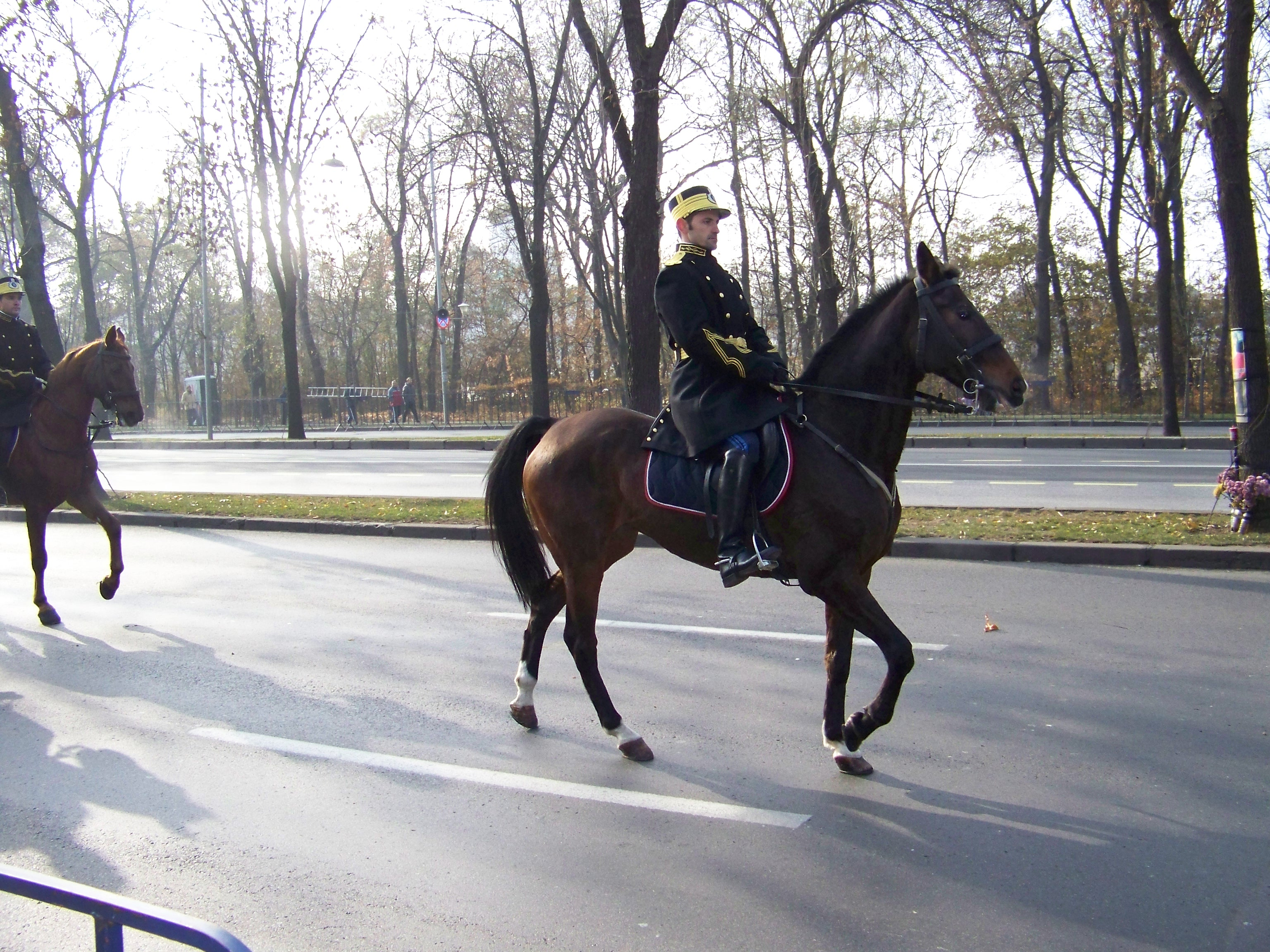
Gendarmerie Cavalry in winter dress uniform

During the period up to 1915 the Romanian Gendarmerie wore a distinctive dress comprising a shako with white plume, dark blue tunic with red facings, white trefoil epaulettes and aiguillettes plus light blue trousers with red stripes. Mounted units of the Gendarmerie wore a silver helmet with spike and white plume, a similar tunic to the foot branch but with yellow epaulettes and aiguillettes, white breeches and high boots.

Currently the Romanian gendarmes wear dark blue berets/caps, shirts/T-shirts and trousers as everyday uniforms, while the winter uniforms include fur trimmed clothes and a fur hat. The dress uniform consists of a light blue tunic, white shirt, dark blue tie and dark blue trousers for the commissioned officers, and a dark blue tunic, white shirt and dark blue trousers for the NCO's and privates. The Honour Guard (Garda de Onoare) wears a light blue and black uniform of nineteenth century style with plumed kepis, white fringed epaulettes and red facings, and white gloves. Likewise, the Mounted Detachment wears a similar late-nineteenth century style uniform, adding the white plumed pickelhaube.

== Ranks and insignia ==
Unlike the Romanian Police, the Gendarmerie is a military body, and uses the same ranking system as the Romanian Land Forces.

=== Officers ===
NATO code	OF-10	OF-9	OF-8	OF-7	OF-6	OF-5	OF-4	OF-3	OF-2	OF-1
(Romania) Romanian Gendarmerie
(Romania) Romanian Gendarmerie	Mareșal	General	General-locotenent	General-maior	General de brigadă	Colonel	Locotenent-colonel	Maior	Căpitan	Locotenent	Sublocotenent

=== Warrant officers ranks ===
NATO rank	OR-9		OR-8	OR-7	OR-6	OR-5
(Romania) Romanian Gendarmerie
(Romania) Romanian Gendarmerie	Maistru militar principal	Maistru militar clasa I	Maistru militar clasa II	Maistru militar clasa III	Maistru militar clasa IV

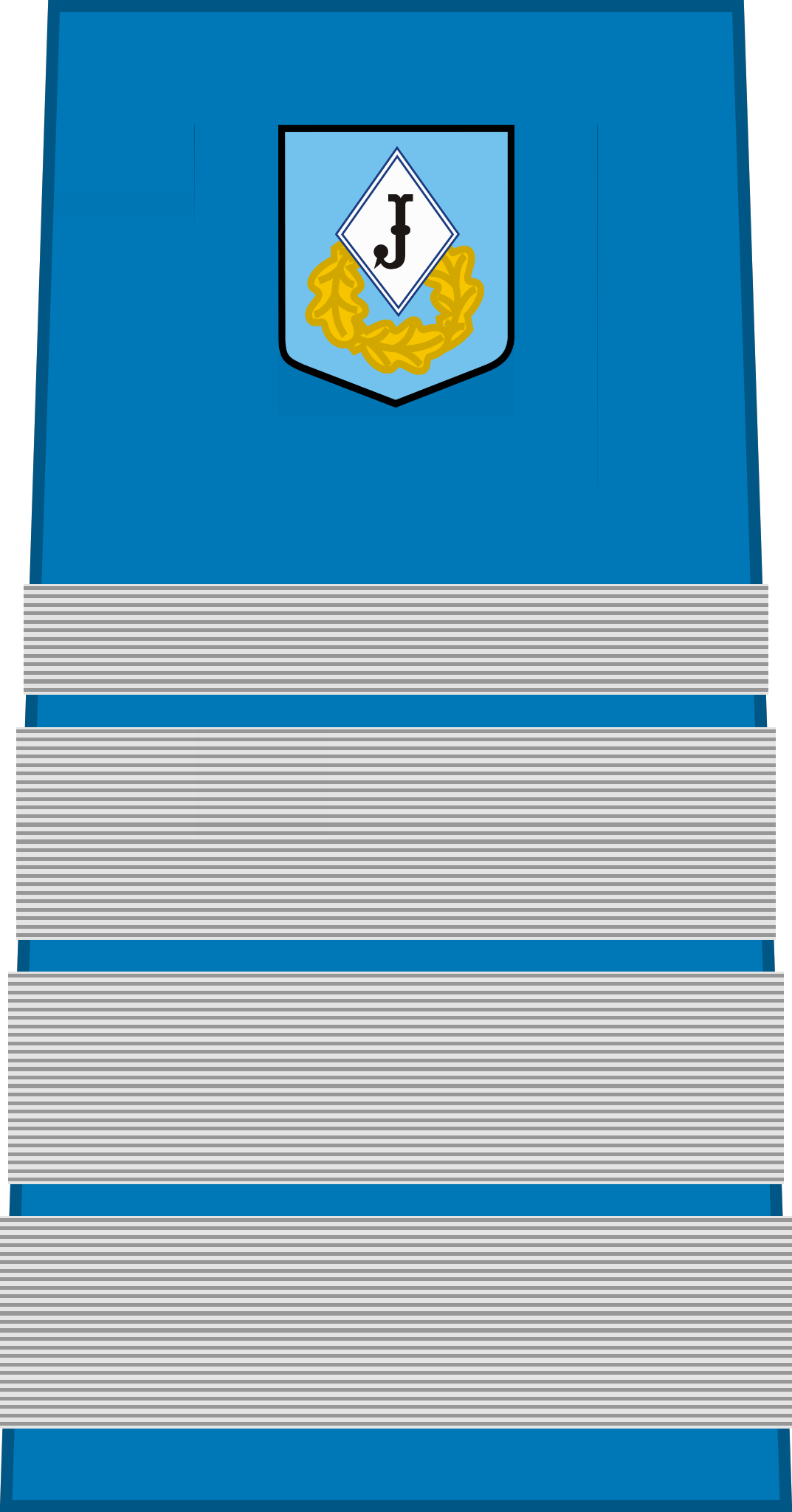
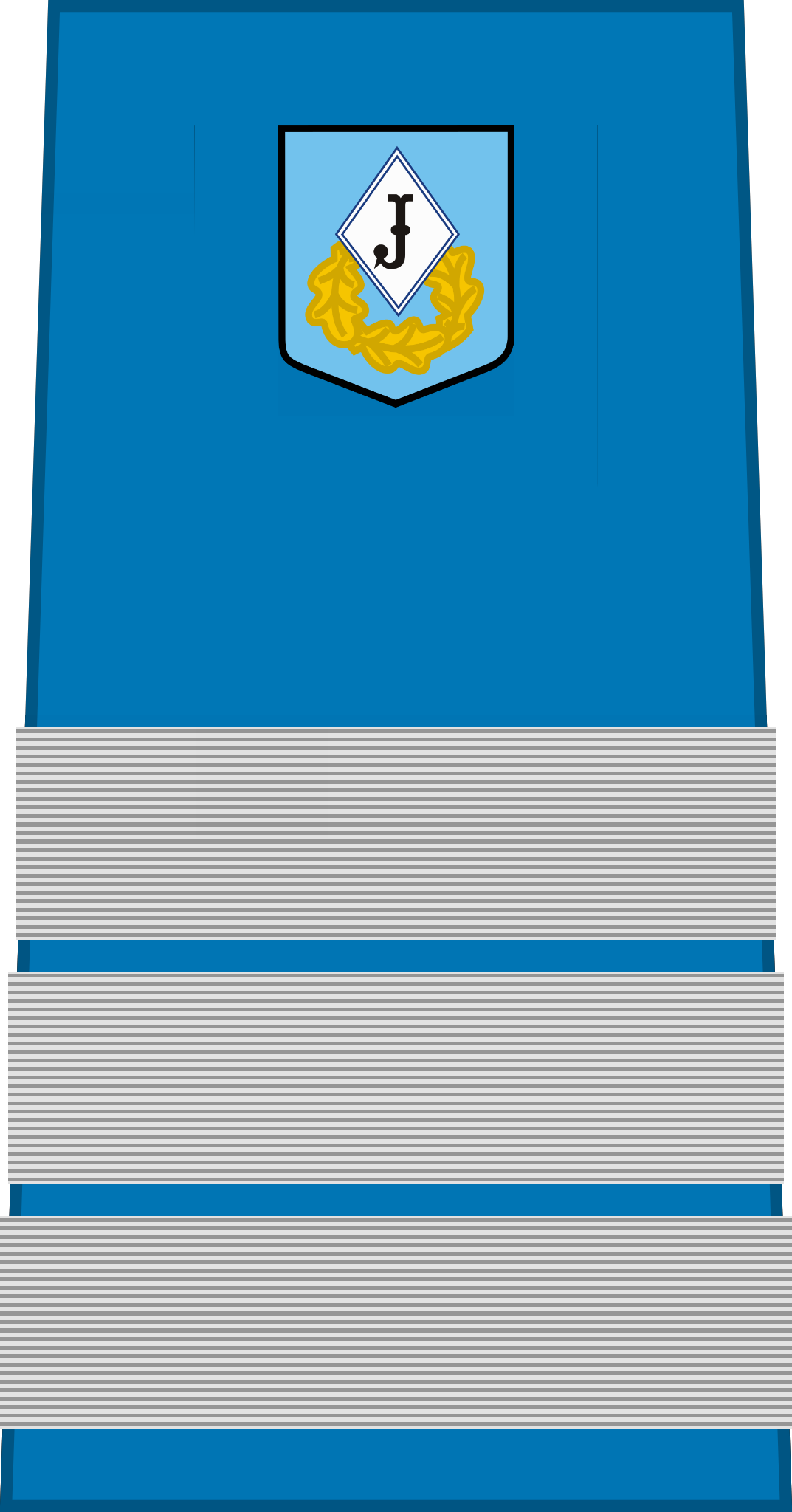
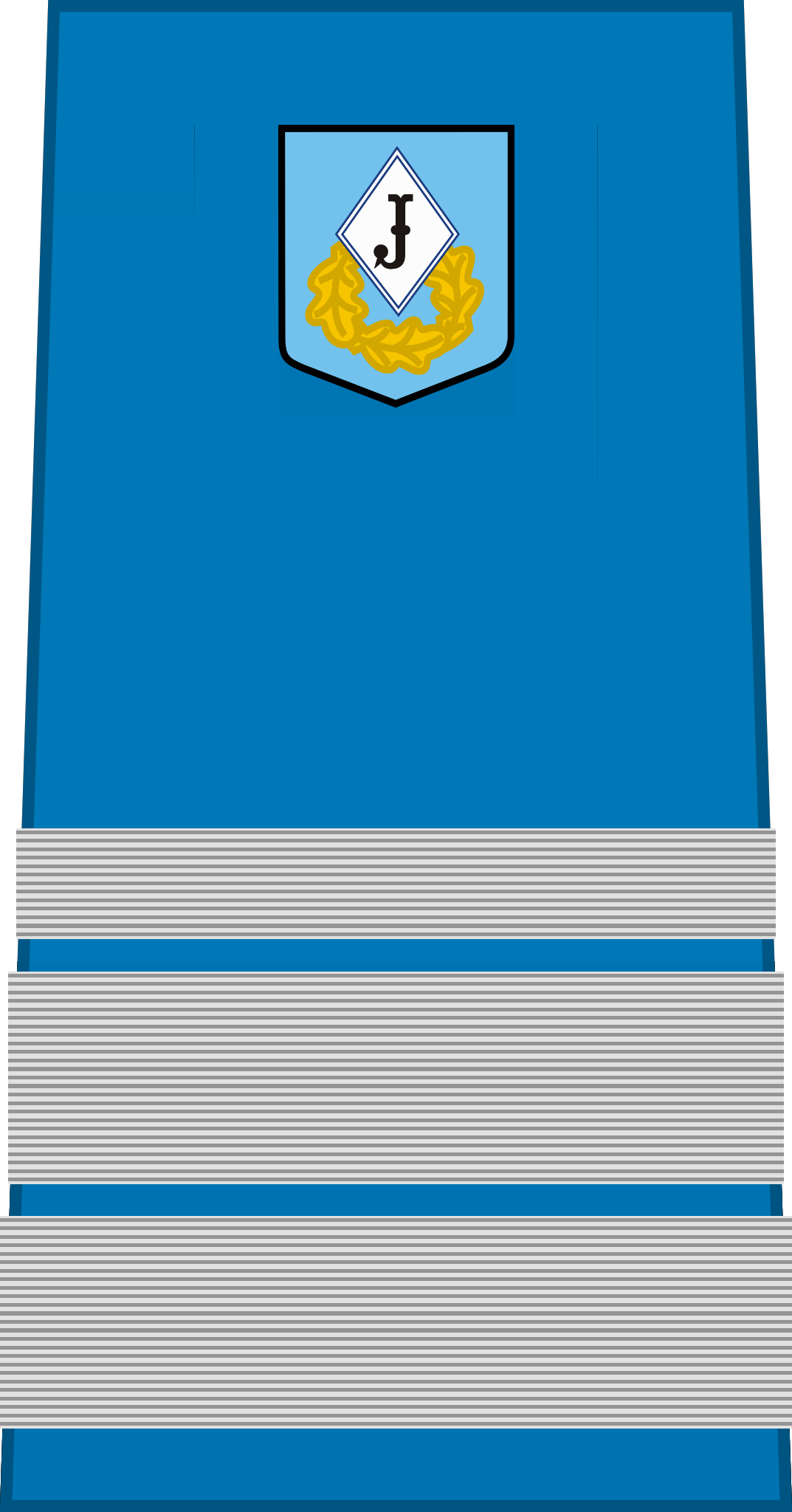
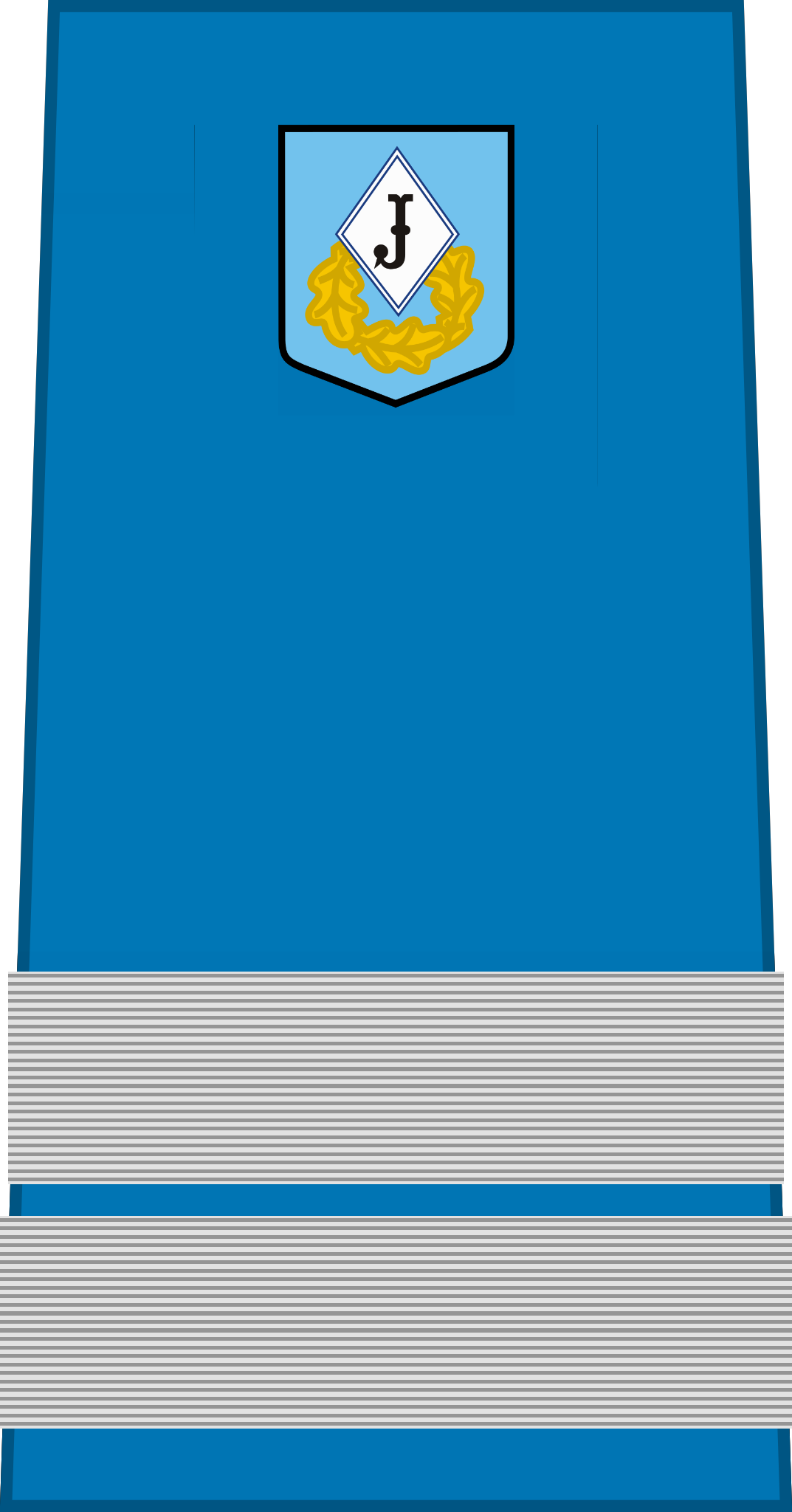
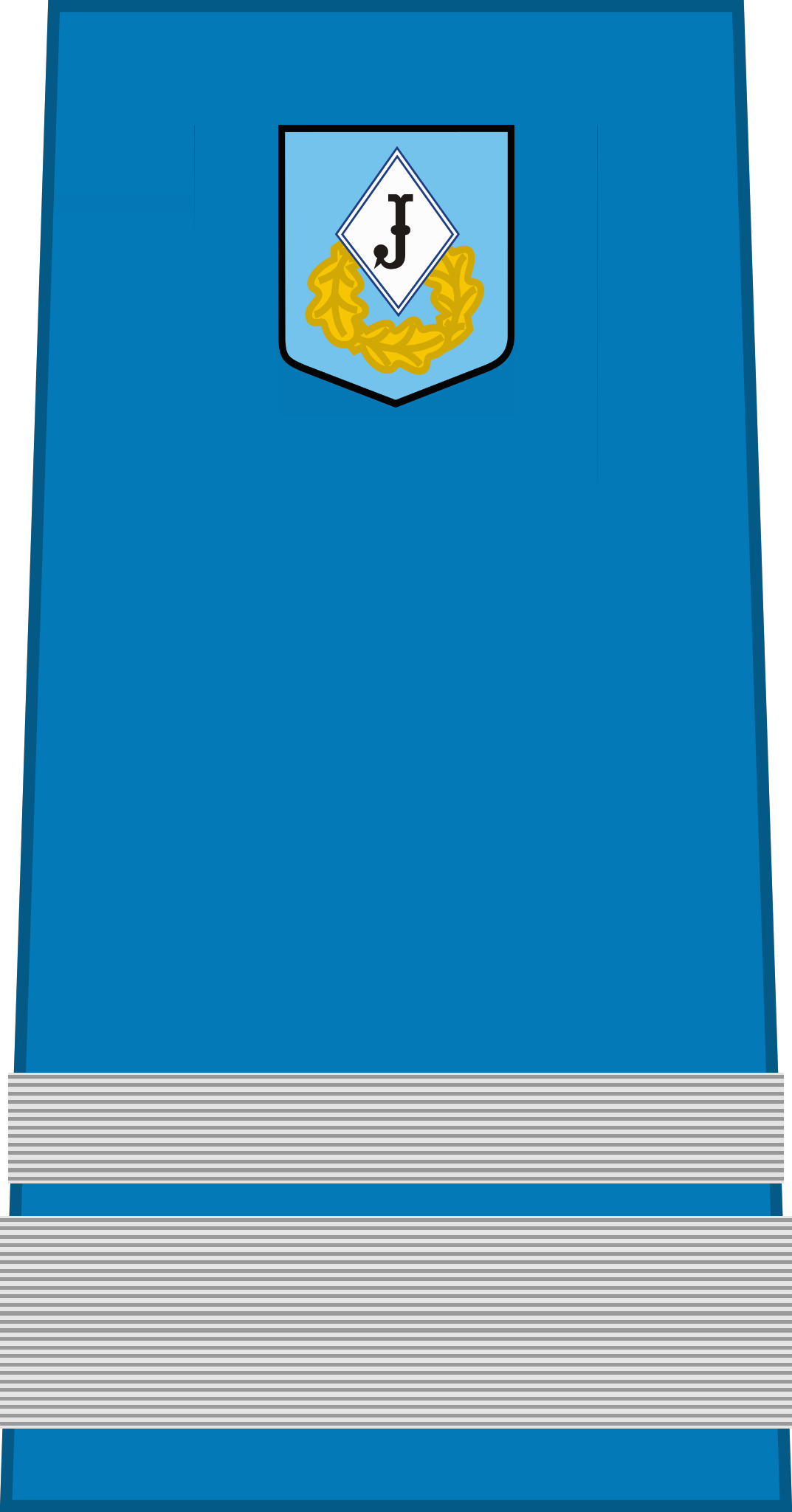
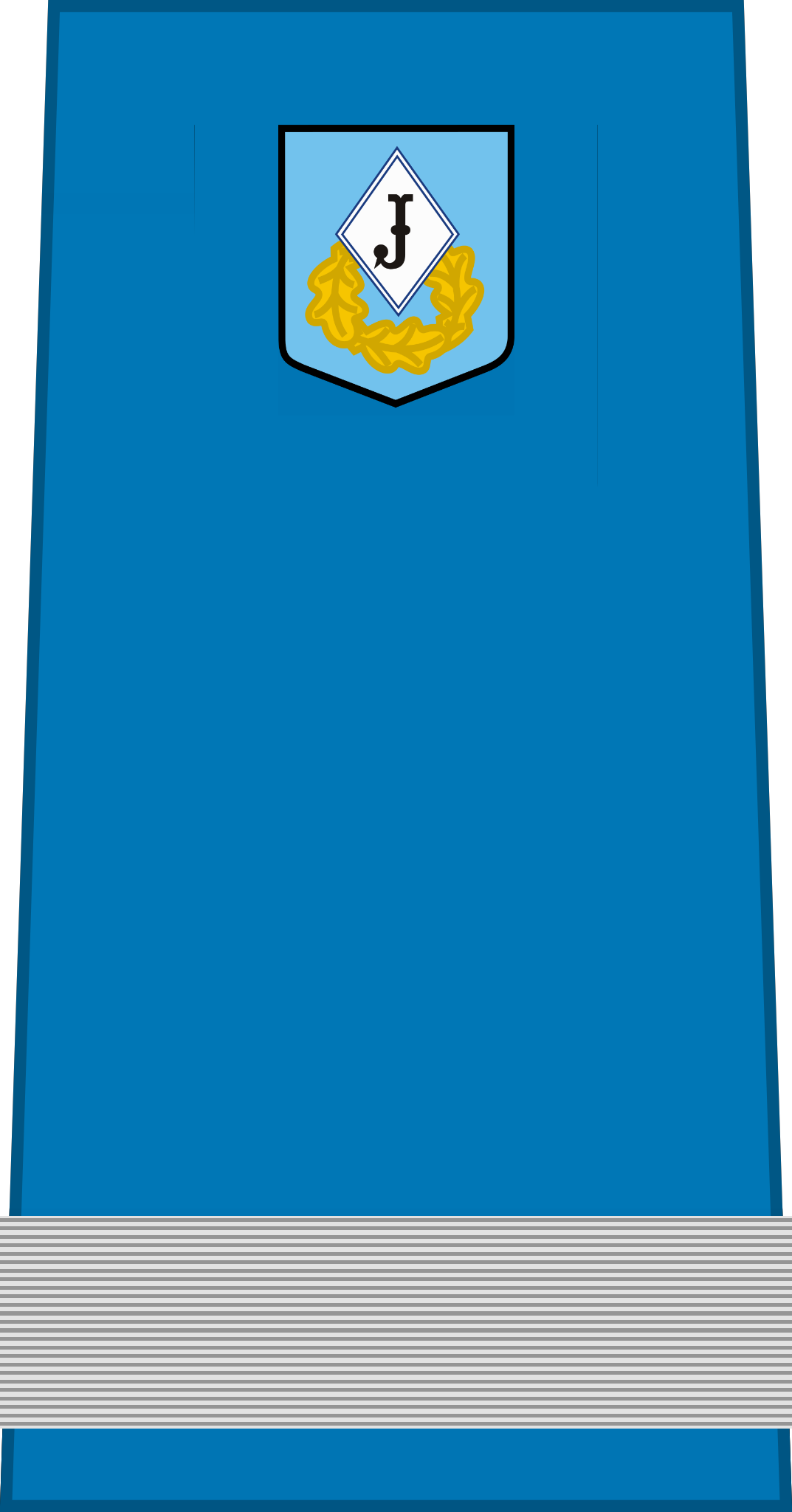
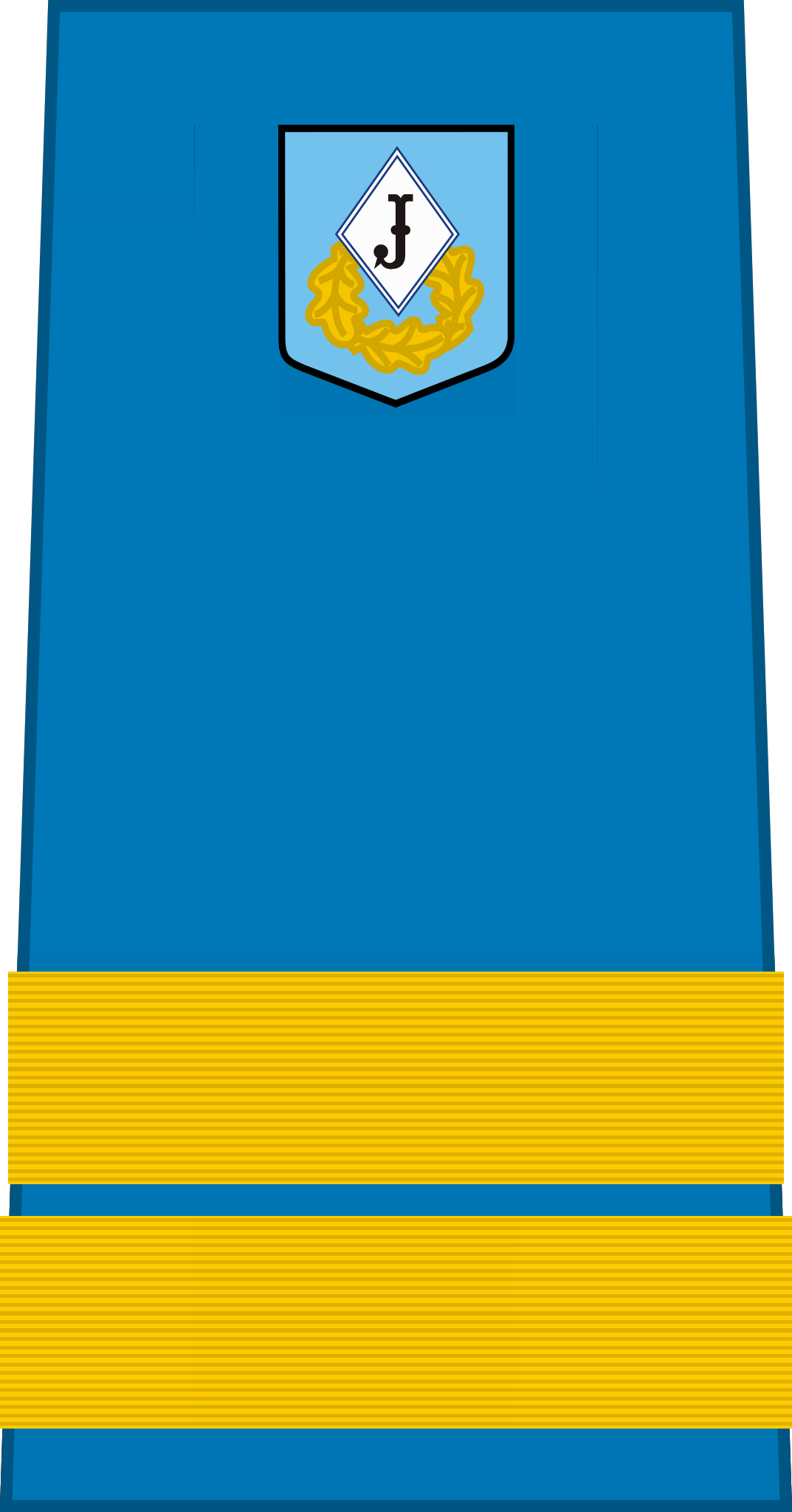
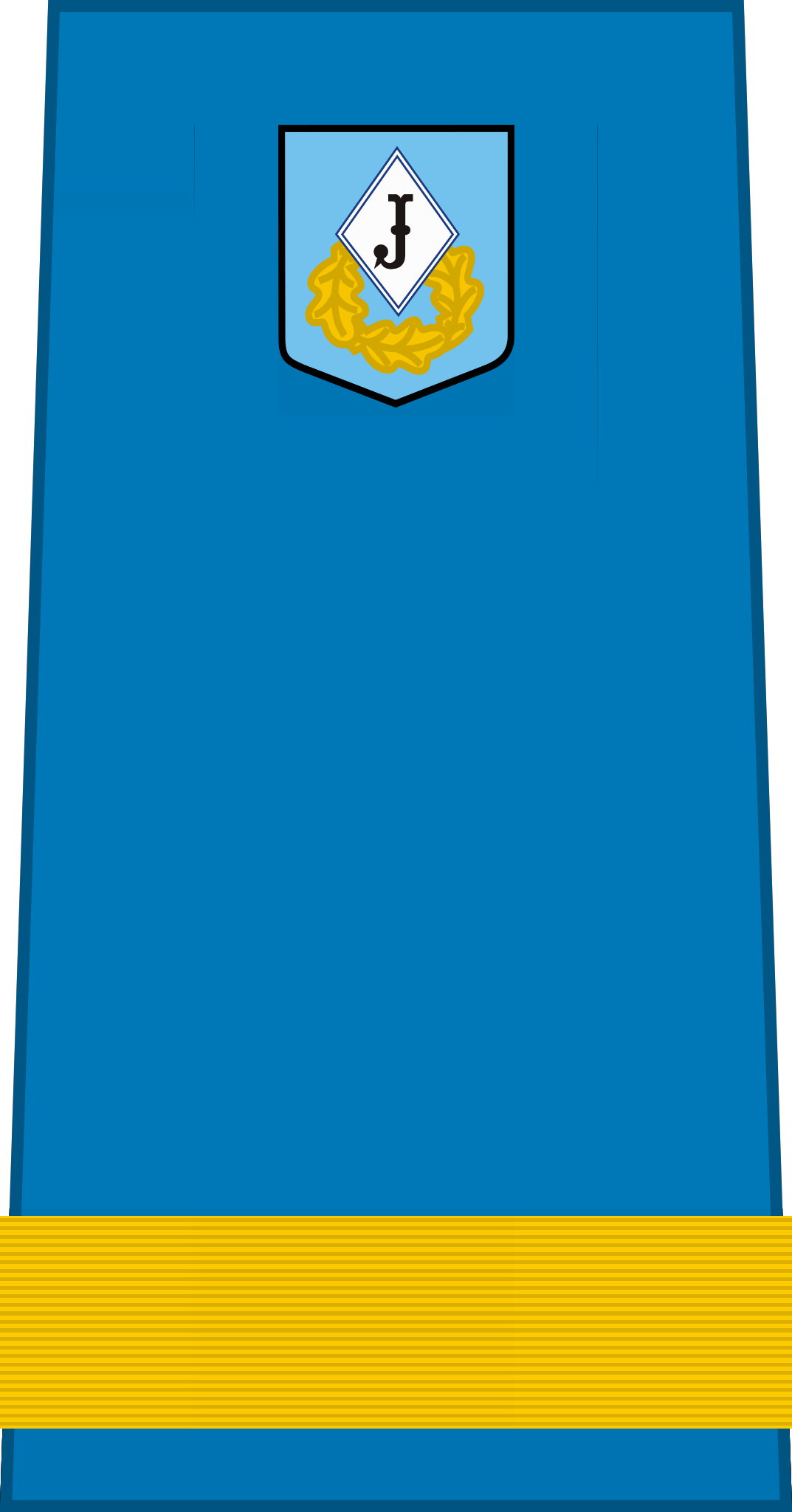
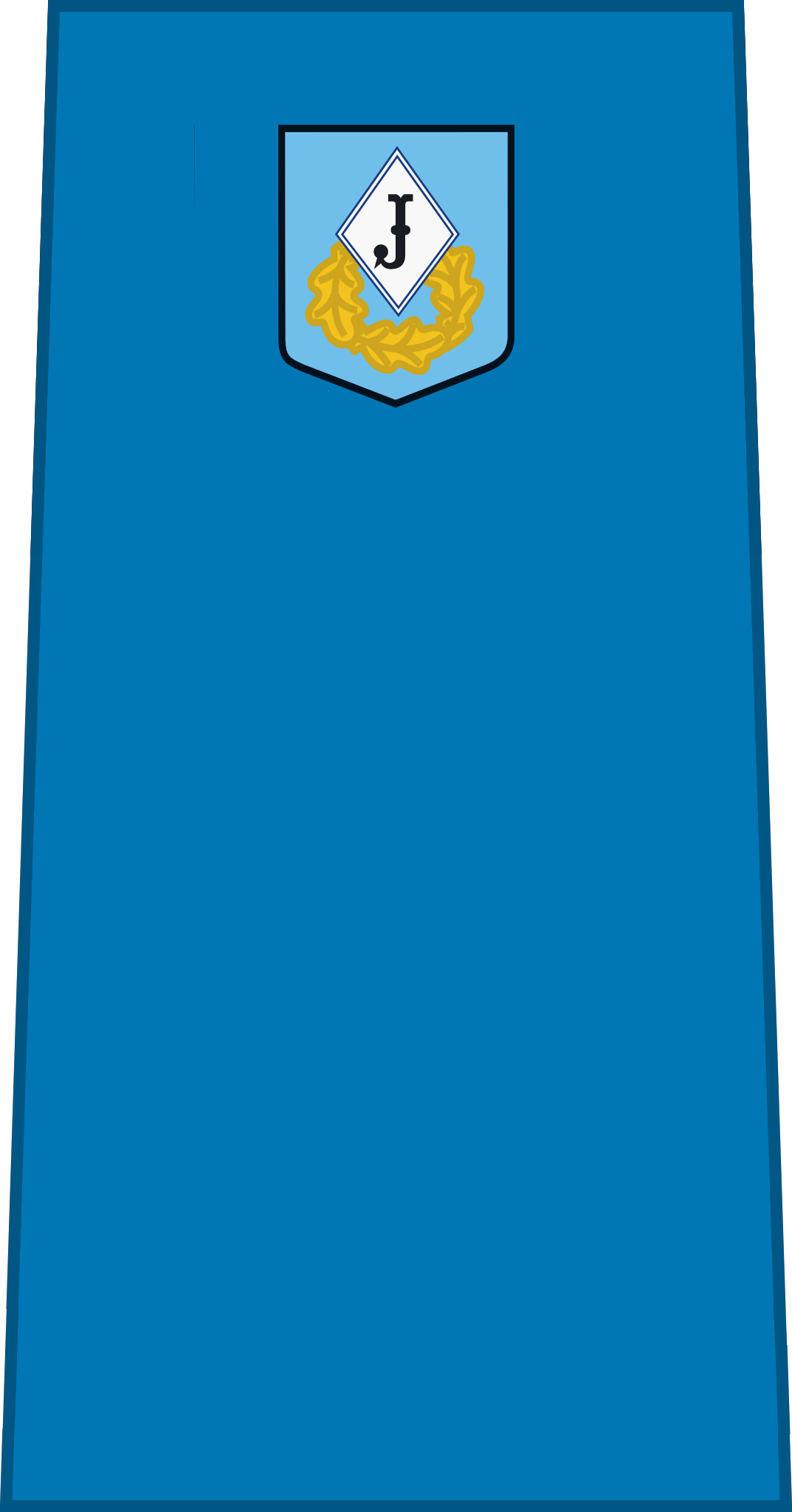
NATO code	OR-9		OR-8	OR-7	OR-6	OR-5	OR-4	OR-3	OR-2	OR-1
(Romania) Romanian Gendarmerie
(Romania) Romanian Gendarmerie	Plutonier adjutant șef	Plutonier adjutant	Plutonier-major	Plutonier	Sergent-major	Sergent	Caporal	Fruntaș	Jandarm

== International affiliations ==
The Romanian Gendarmerie is a full member of the Association of the European and Mediterranean Police Forces and Gendarmeries with Military Status (FIEP), along with the National Gendarmerie, the Italian Carabinieri, the Spanish Guardia Civil, the Portuguese Guarda Nacional Republicana, the Turkish Gendarmerie, the Moroccan Royal Gendarmerie and the Dutch Royal Marechaussee.

After Romania's accession to the European Union, the Jandarmeria sought to be accepted as permanent observer to the European Gendarmerie Force, as a first step towards full membership. On 3 March 2009, the Romanian Gendarmerie became a full member.

== International missions ==
Since February 2002, 115 Romanian gendarmes have been deployed in Peć, Kosovo, as part of the UNMIK police force. Beginning with 2008 Romanian Gendarmerie was part of EULEX Mission in Kosovo (Rule of Law) and it participated with a detachment of gendarmes located in Mitrovica. In 2011 Romanian Gendarmerie withdrew the EULEX Mission according to the decision of the Romanian authorities.

== Gallery ==
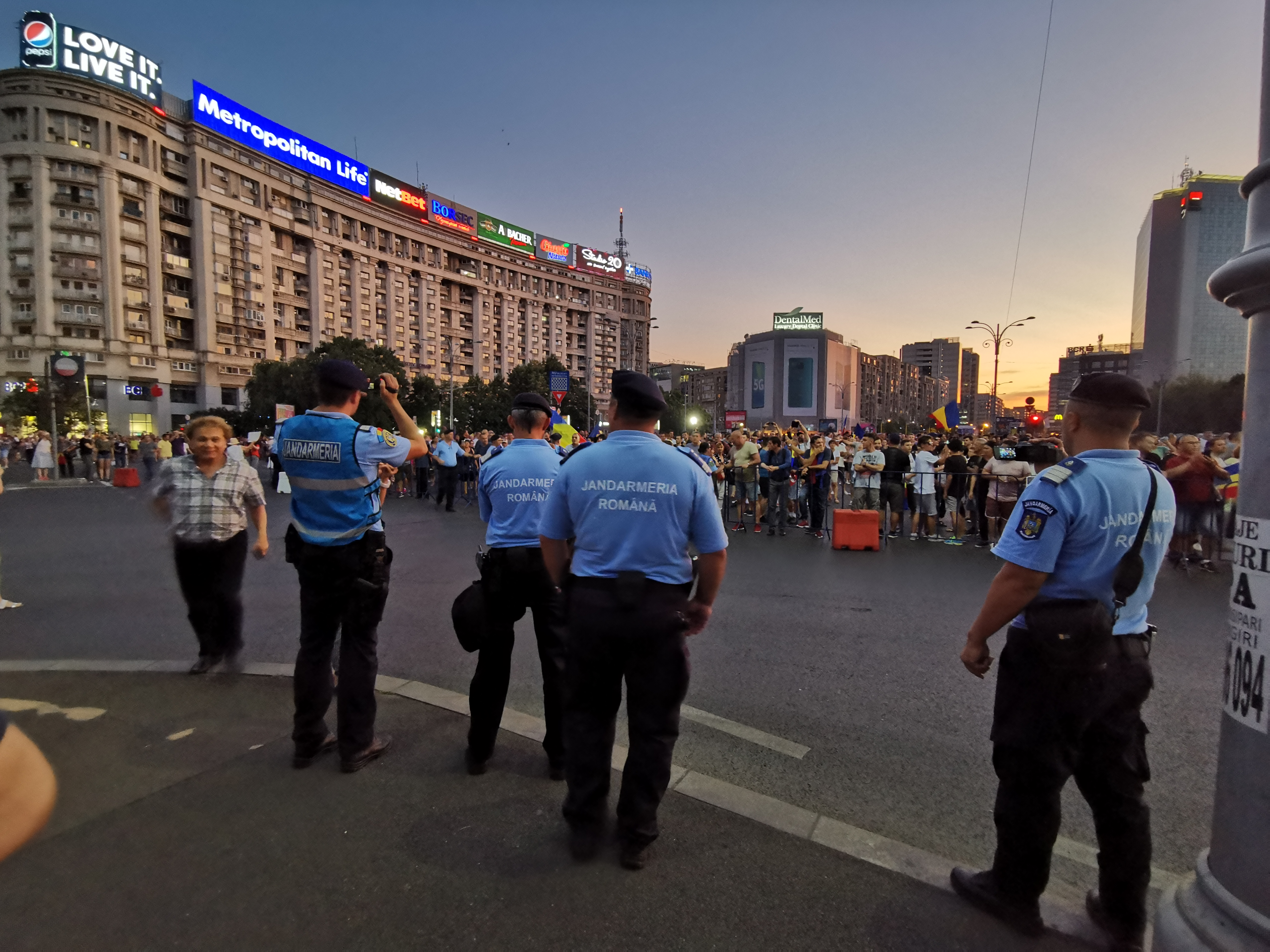
Gendarms at a protest in Victory Square, Bucharest in 2019

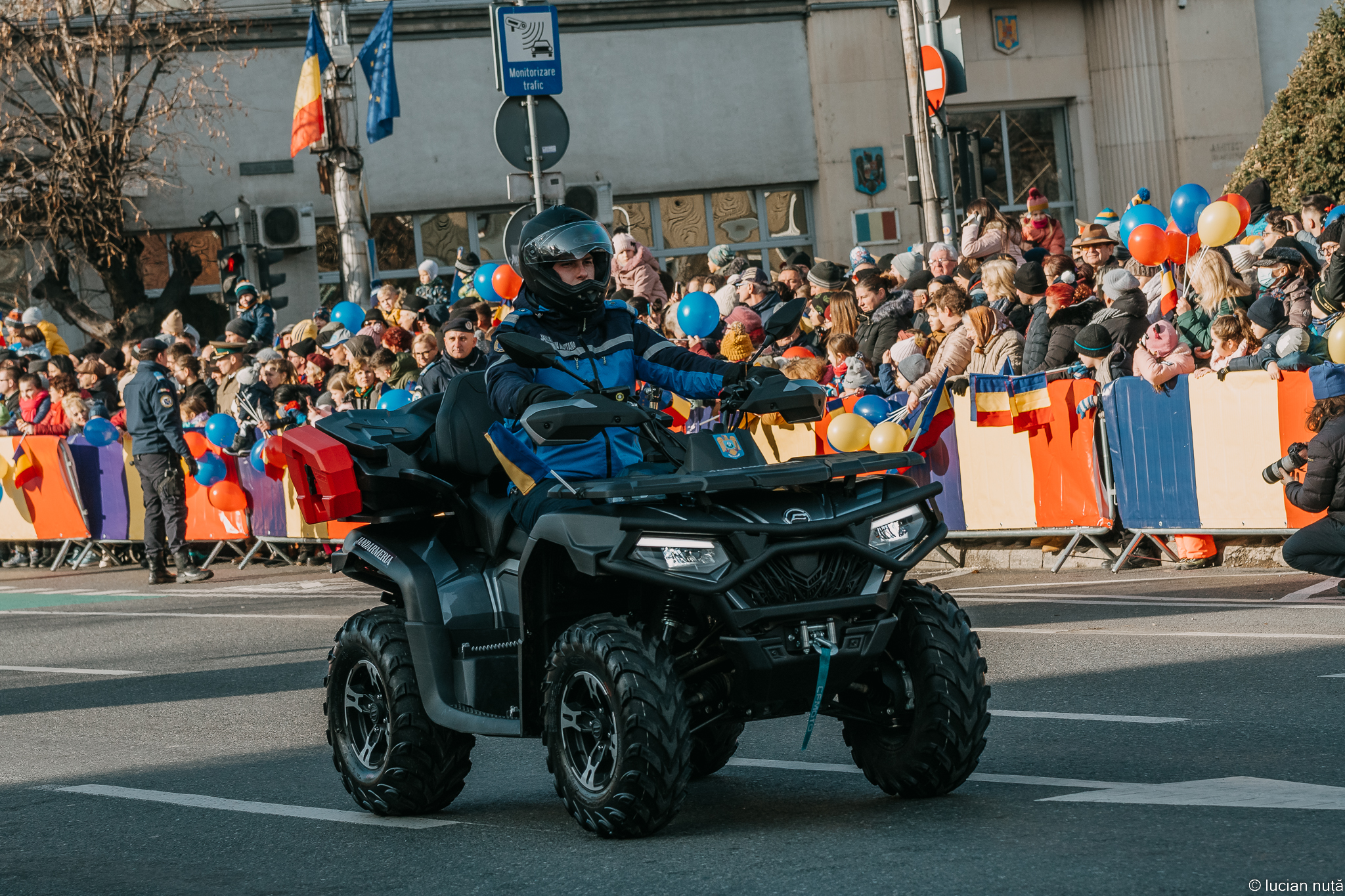
Gendarmerie ATV

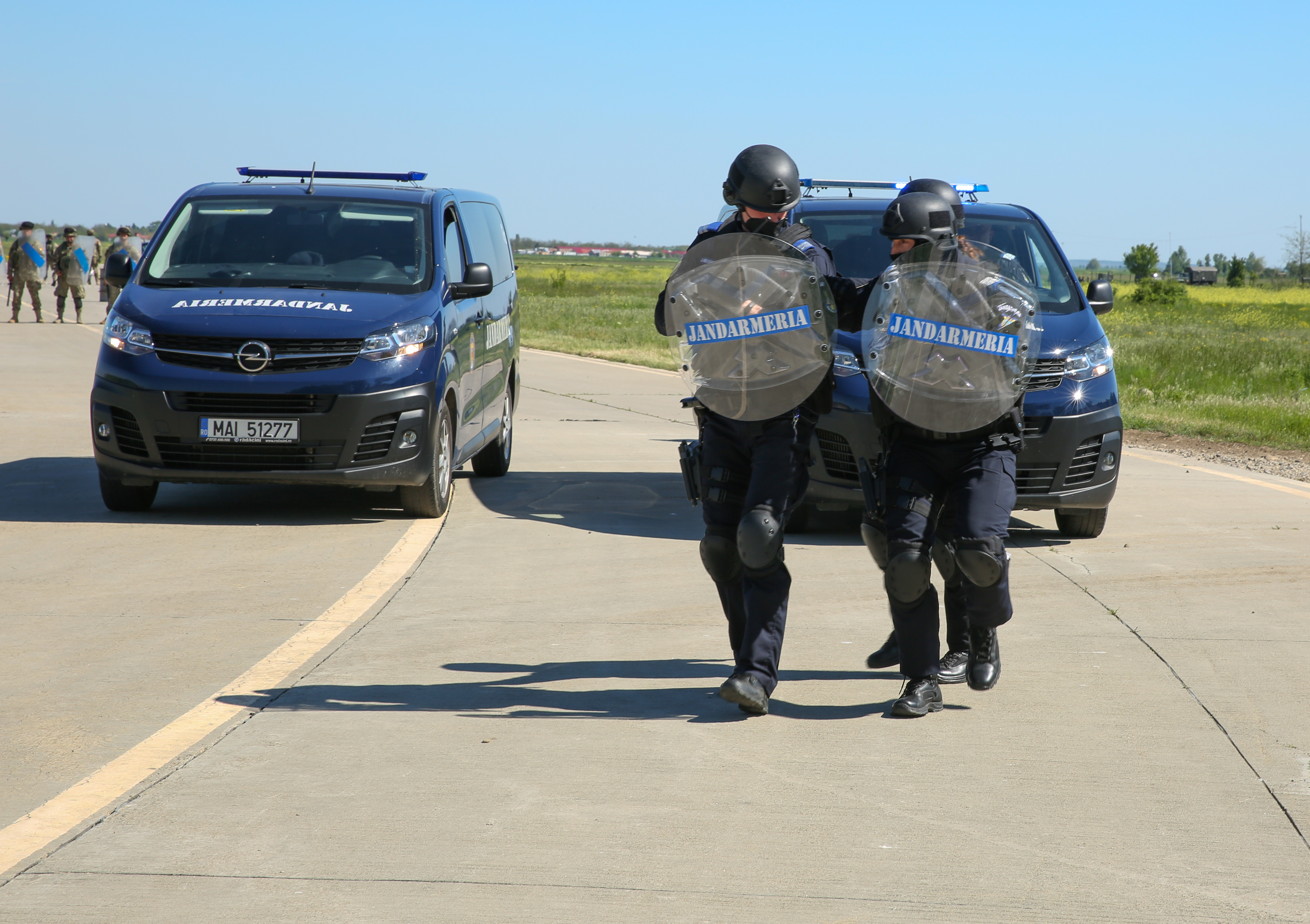
Gendarms in riot control formation

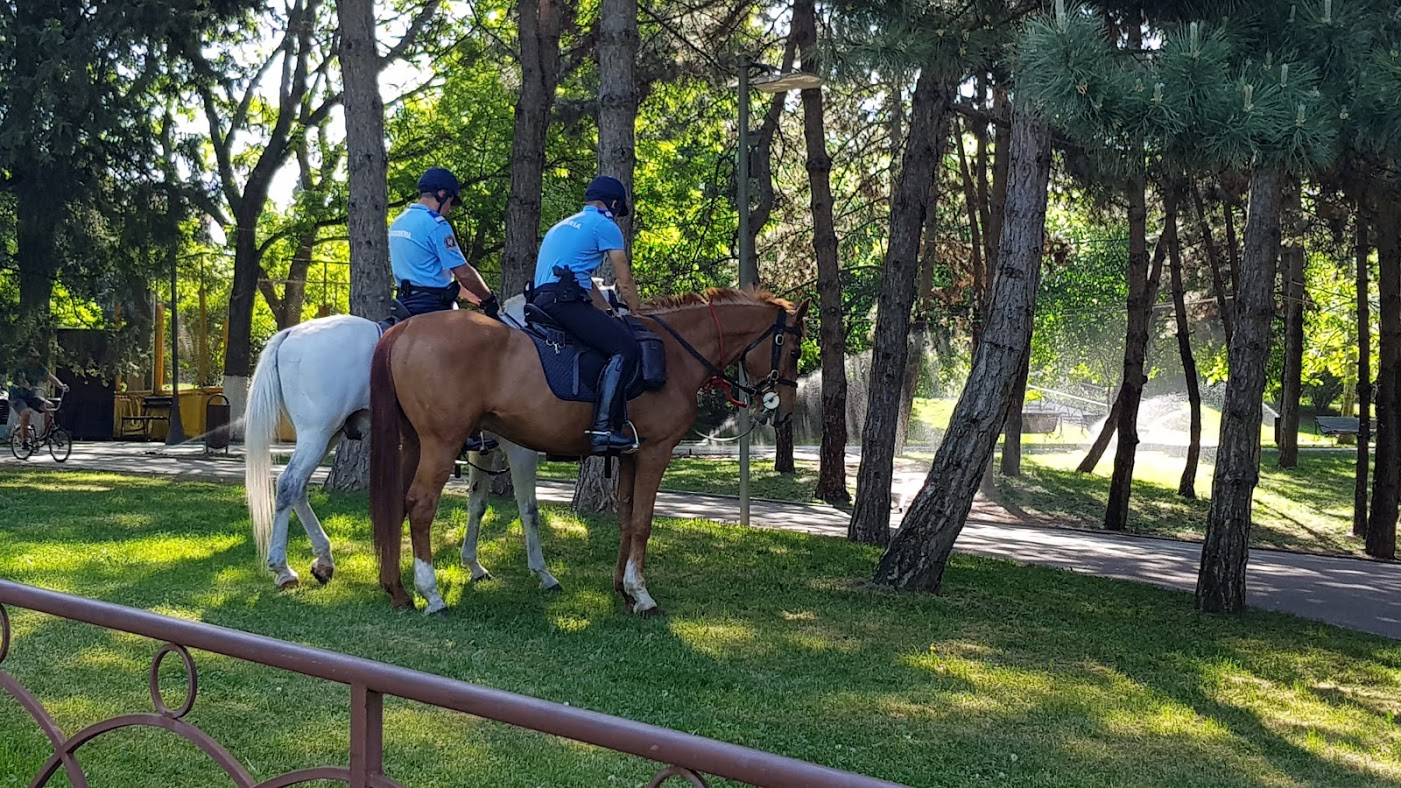
Mounted Gendarms in the IOR Park

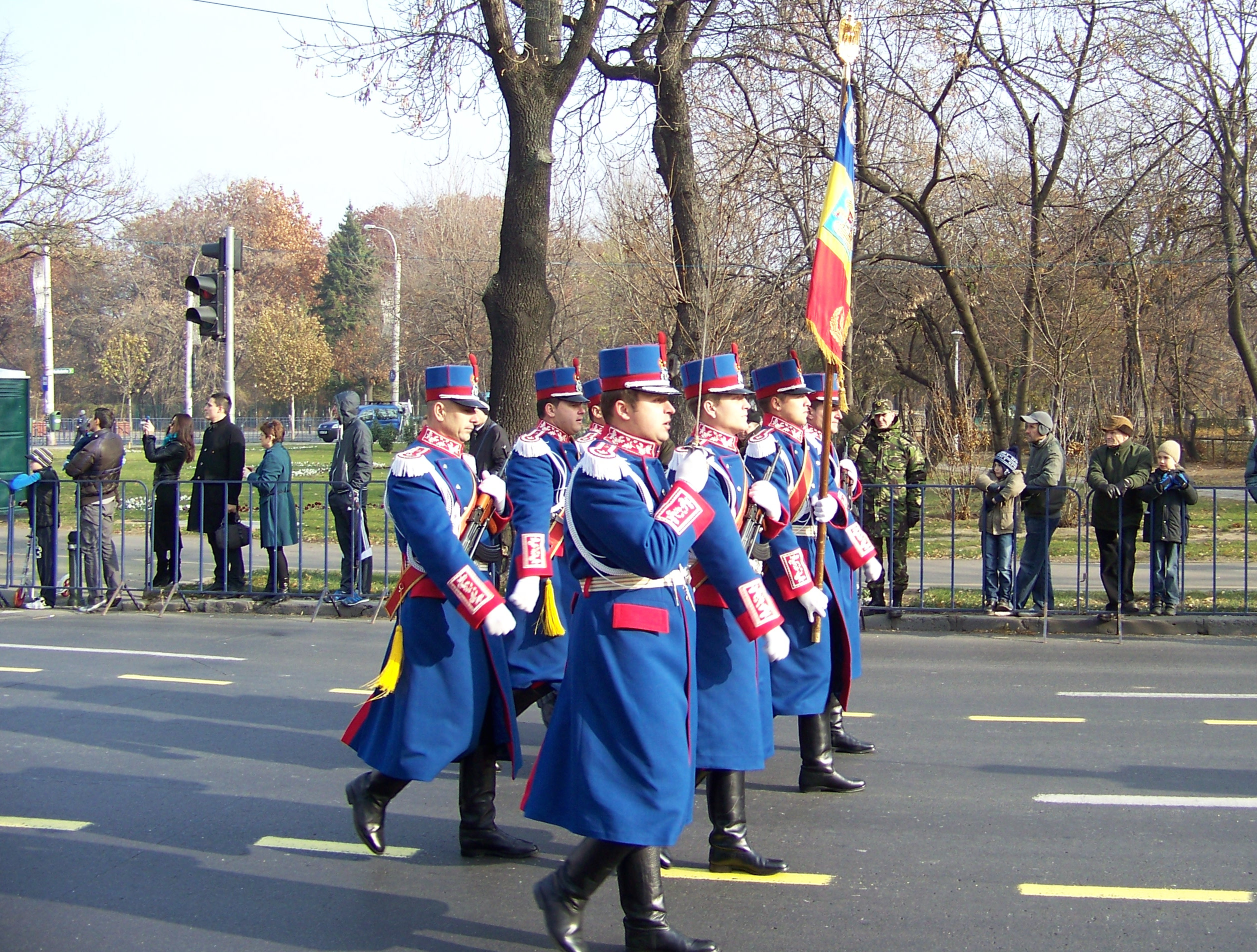
Honour Guard of the Gendarmerie

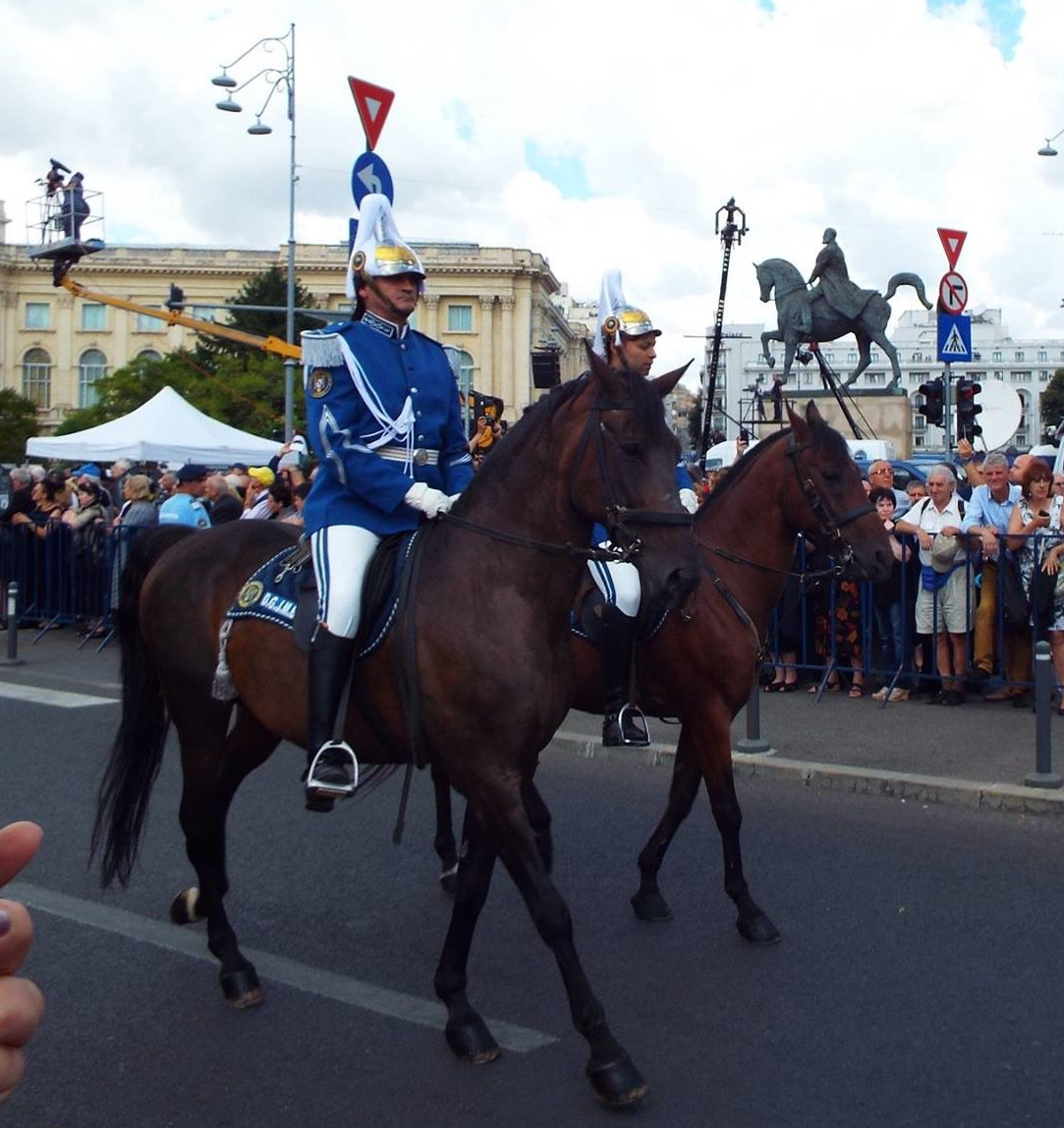
Mounted detachment at the funeral of Queen Anne

== See also ==
- Law enforcement in Romania
