= Fil de Cassons =

Mountain in Switzerland

- Cassonsgrat
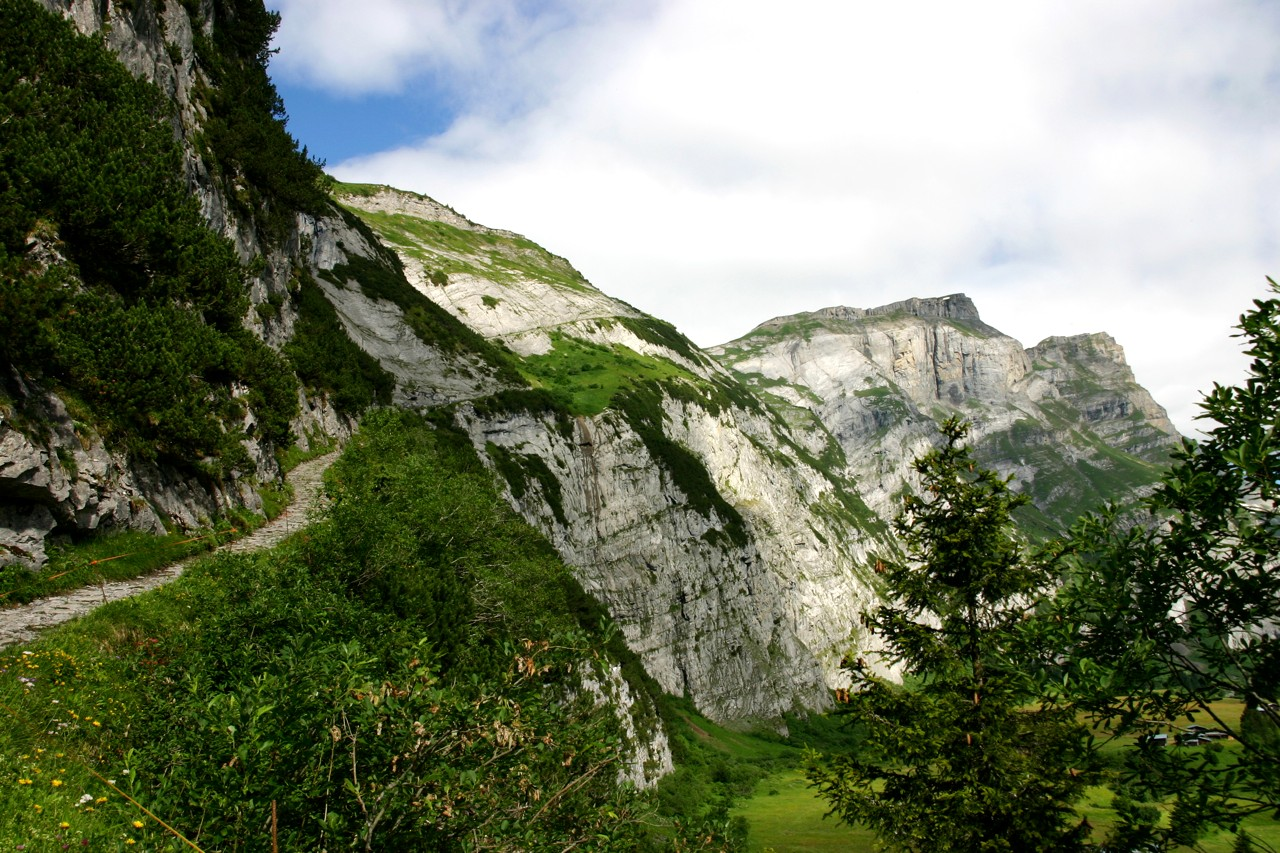
- Fil de Cassons eastern face into Val Bargis valley, Scala Mola path.

Highest point
- Elevation: 2,695 m (8,842 ft)
- Prominence: 144 m (472 ft)
- Parent peak: Piz Segnas
- Coordinates: 46°52′42.5″N 9°16′48.5″E

Geography
- Location within Switzerland
- Location: Graubünden, Switzerland
- Parent range: Glarus Alps

Fil de Cassons (also known as Cassonsgrat) is a mountain in the Glarus Alps, located near Flims in the canton of Graubünden, Switzerland.

The southern face is referred to as "Flimserstein", dominating the appearance of the town of Flims. In its east lies Bargis from where a valley leads to its north face, while to its western face the sliding surface tears off of the biggest visible landslide in the world, Flims Rockslide. Piz Dolf is lying to the north across the Bargis valley, and to its west Piz Segnas, both showing the tectonic line of the Glarus thrust in its upper part, a now UNESCO world heritage.

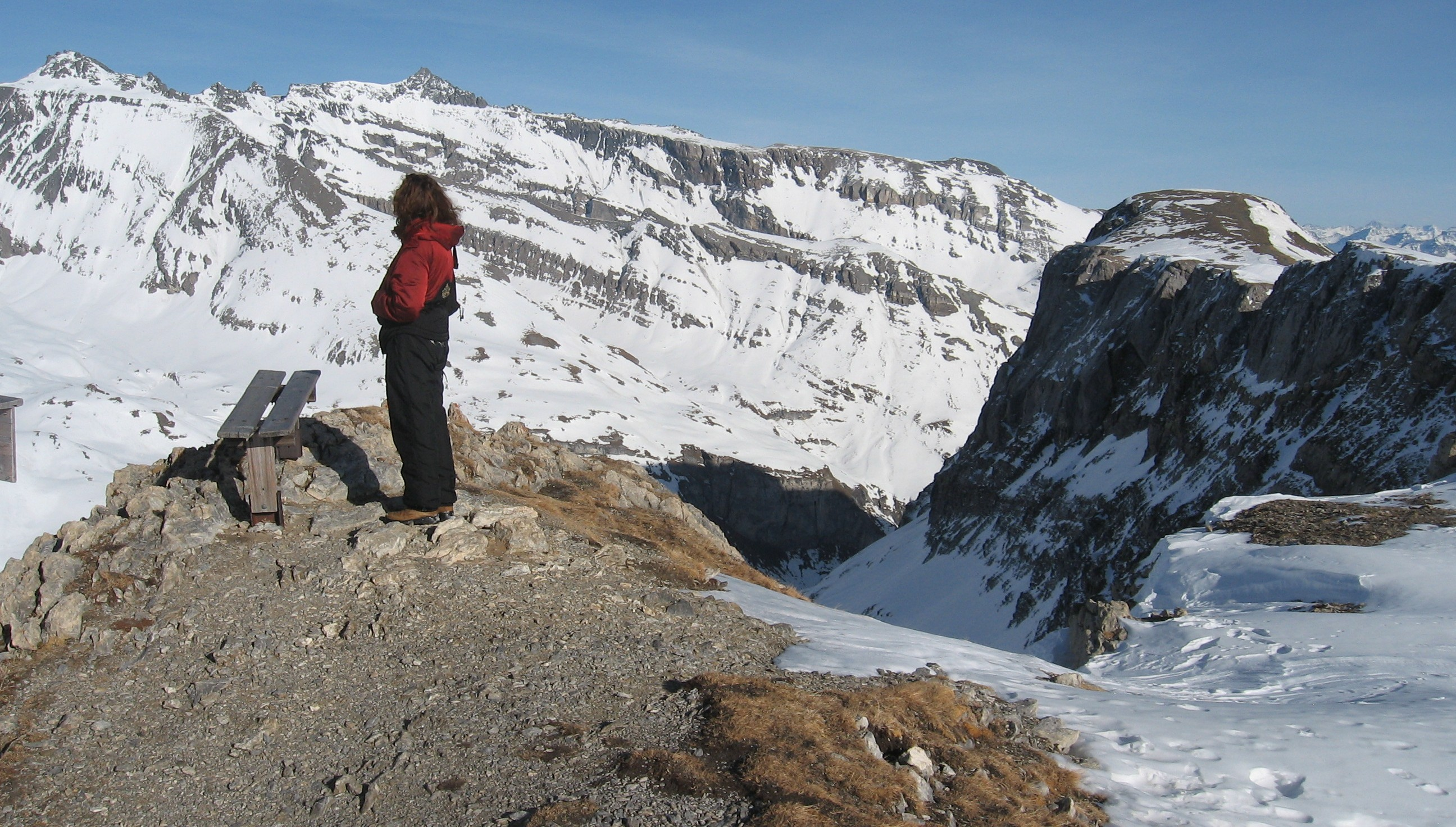
Fil de Cassons often without snow in winter due to being a ridge; highest point to the right

The easiest access to Fil de Cassons was an aerial cableway from Flims to this ridge, (but it was taken down in 2015) that actually allows also walks and an alpine experience from the cablecar for people that would not dare to walk a steep mountain path. Walking on top you will easily identify the tectonic line under your feet, as rocks turn from greenish to bright light grey on top of the wide ridge. For hikers aiming for more than a walk, several routes reach the high plateau and the very wide ridge, among them a historic Via Ferrata called Pinut. One hiking route uses the ascent via Val Bargis and Scala Mola, the path that the cows are being sent up to graze in summer. If you stay at the base of the valley of Bargis, you will hike on a path leading more or less around Fil de Cassons from east to northwest before reaching its top.

Being a ridge, there is very often hardly snow, allowing walks even in winter along at least one mile on Fil de Cassons.

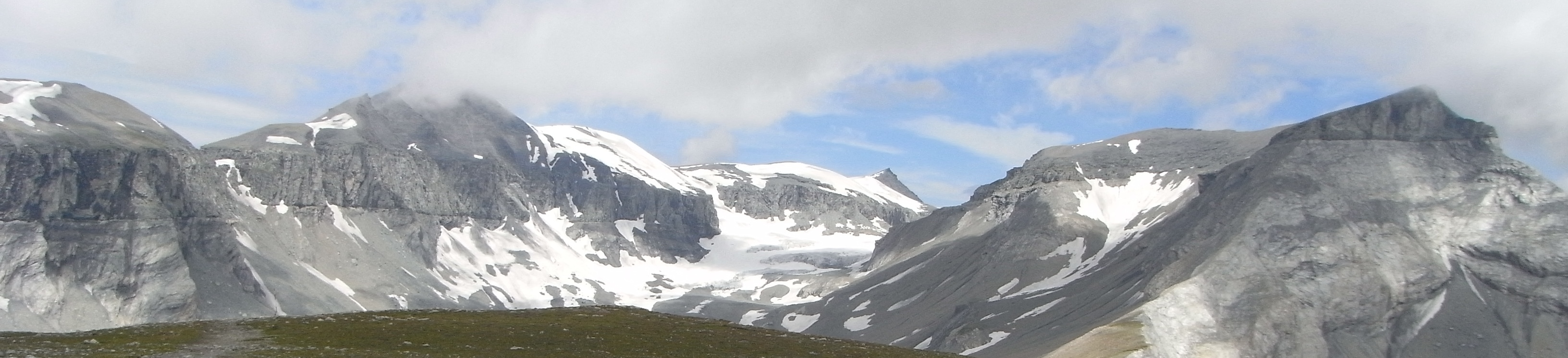
Glarus Thrust fault at Piz Dolf (right) and Piz Segnes as seen from Fil de Cassons
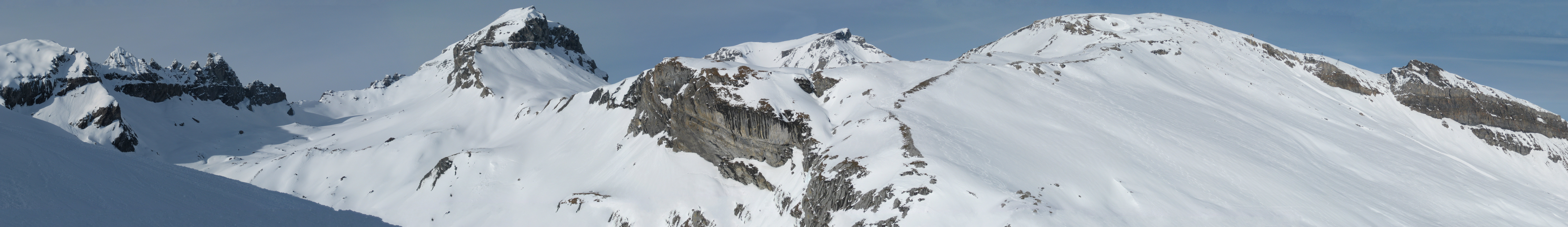
Fil de Cassons, the wide ridge on the right, with mountains to see from, to its left: Piz Dolf, Piz Segnas and 7 peaks of "Tschingelhörner" far left

== See also ==
- List of mountains of Switzerland accessible by public transport
