= Il spir =

Platform

Coordinates: 46.8130°N 9.31893°E

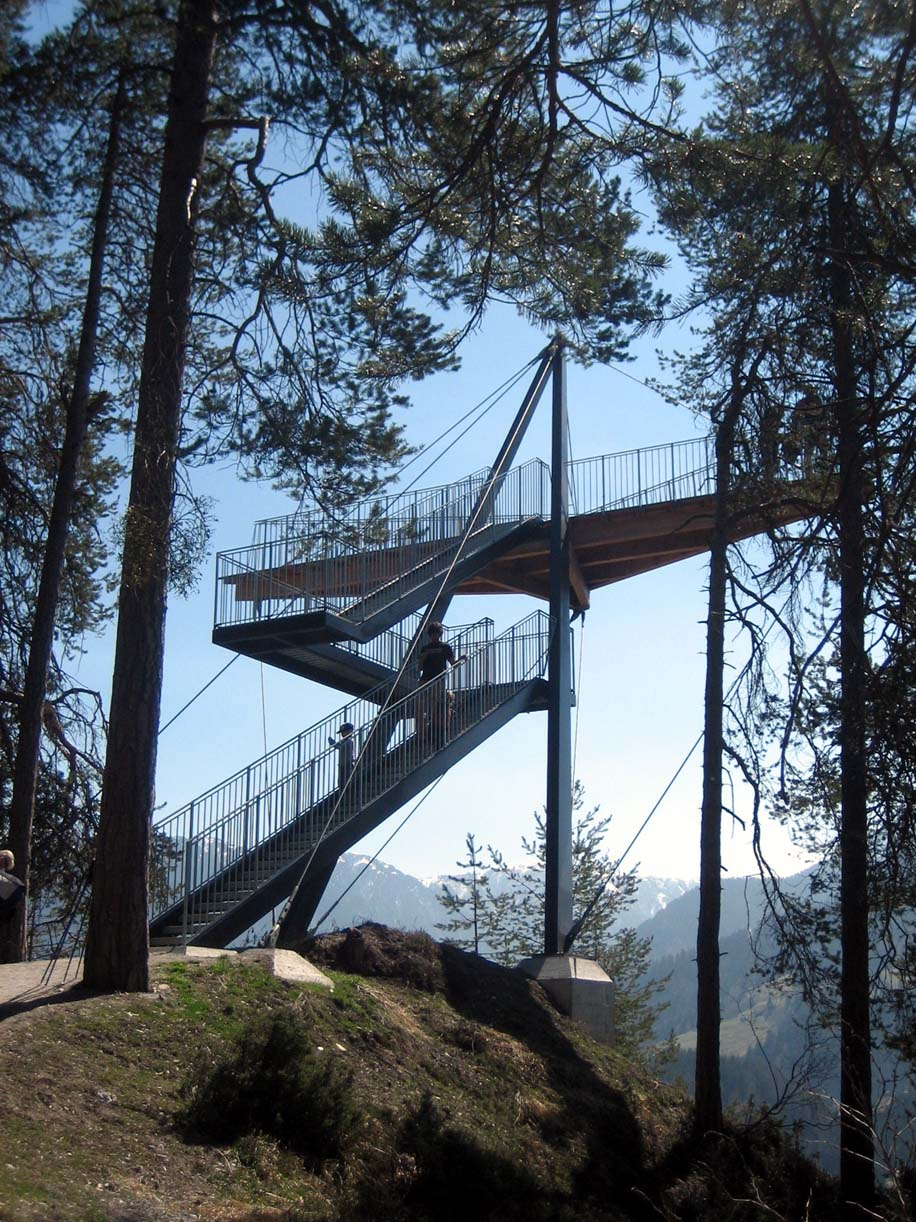
"Il spir" at Conn

View from the platform to Rhine and Rhaetian Railway bridge

Il Spir is a viewing platform at Conn, a location near Flims in the canton of Graubünden in Switzerland.

The platform overlooking the Ruinaulta gorge of the Vorderrhein river was designed by Corinna Menn and opened in 2006. It allows a good view of the gorge and the river lying some 400 meters below. While it took 40,000,000 years to develop the Grand Canyon in Arizona, the young Rhine dug this gorge within 10,000 years. This is the age of Flims Rockslide, which covered the original Rhine valley with its debris. The river is still running through debris, meaning it has not reached the former valley yet. Flims Rockslide is the biggest rockslide whose effects are still visible in the world.

The platform has the shape of a common swift, a common sight at the southern faces of the gorge, and consists of one single pylon, anchored by wire rope.

There is no access to near the platform for individual traffic nor public transport and the only means of transport is a privately rented carriage. Walking from Flims-Waldhaus, one can reach the platform in less than an hour, which is a slightly shorter distance as to Trin-Mulin, both villages being on the main road and offering an hourly service by the Swiss postbus system. The multi-day trekking route "Senda Sursilvana" passes Conn as well.
