= Serviciul de Poliție pentru Intervenție Rapidă =

The Serviciul Special de Poliție pentru Intervenție Rapidă (Police Rapid Intervention Service, SSPIR) was created in 1999, as a Romanian Police special operations unit for Bucharest.

SPIR is divided in five units:

1. Detașamentul Mobil pentru Siguranța Publică (Mobile Public Security Detachment, DMSP)
2. Detașamentul Special pentru Intervenții Flagrante (Special Immediate Intervention Detachment, DSIF)
3. Detașamentul pentru Intervenții și Escorte Speciale (Special Escort and Intervention Detachment, DIES)
4. Detașamentul pentru Intervenții și Acțiuni Speciale (Special Action and Intervention Detachment, DIAS)
5. Detașamentul Special pentru Combaterea Violenței (Special Counter-riot Detachment, DSCV)
